= Inter IISER Sports Meet =

Inter-college sports meet

Tournament information
- Location: India
- Established: 2012
- Administrator: Indian Institutes of Science Education and Research
- Participants: 1500 athletes
- Website: IISM 2025

Current champion
- IISER Bhopal (2025)

Inter IISER Sports Meet is the annual sports tournament of the 7 IISERs, NISER, Indian Institute of Science and UM-DAE CEBS Mumbai. It is organized in December. It is the Inter-collegiate meet where research institutes participate, having been held since 2012. Last year (2025), the event was held at NISER Bhubaneswar.

== Sports and participating institutes ==
Tournaments are held in 15 different sports, namely:

1. Athletics
2. Badminton
3. Basketball
4. Cricket
5. Chess
6. Carrom
7. Kho kho
8. Kabaddi
9. Football
10. Lawn tennis
11. Table tennis
12. Volleyball

All the instittes participating in the Inter-IISER Sports Meet:

1. Indian Institute of Science
2. Indian Institute of Science Education and Research, Bhopal
3. Indian Institute of Science Education and Research, Pune
4. Indian Institute of Science Education and Research, Kolkata
5. Indian Institute of Science Education and Research, Mohali
6. Indian Institute of Science Education and Research, Thiruvananthapuram
7. Indian Institute of Science Education and Research, Tirupati
8. Indian Institute of Science Education and Research, Berhampur
9. National Institute of Science Education and Research
10. UM-DAE CEBS Mumbai

== History ==
The first IISM was conducted in 2012 and was hosted by IISER Kolkata and included teams from IISER Kolkata, Pune, Bhopal, TVM and Mohali. Over the years, IISER Tirupati and Brahmapur, have joined the team. IISM has expanded further to include NISER, IISc and CEBS. The privilege to host the IISM comes on a rotation basis and is usually conducted in December each year.

Teams from 10 national institutes compete in 12 sporting events – Athletics, Badminton, Basketball, Chess, Cricket, Football, Kabaddi, Kho Kho, Lawn Tennis, Table Tennis, Carrom and Volleyball for the Championship Trophy. The team that gets the maximum number of medals walks home with the Trophy

=== History and winners ===
| Edition | Year | Held at | Duration | Champions | Runners up |
|---|---|---|---|---|---|
| 1 | 2012 | IISER Kolkata | | IISER Kolkata | IISER TVM |
| 2 | 2013 | IISER Pune | 10-14 Dec | IISER Pune | IISER TVM |
| 3 | 2014 | IISER Mohali | 11-14 Dec | IISER Mohali | IISER Bhopal |
| 4 | 2015 | IISER Bhopal | 15-21 Dec | IISER Bhopal | IISER Pune |
| 5 | 2016 | IISER Kolkata | 08-13 Dec | IISER Pune | IISER Kolkata |
| 6 | 2017 | IISER Mohali | 18-21 Dec | IISER Mohali | IISER Bhopal |
| 7 | 2018 | NISER Bhubaneswar | 15-20 Dec | IISER Bhopal | |
| 8 | 2019 | IISER Pune | 10-14 Dec | IISER Bhopal | IISER Pune |
| --- | 2020 | Cancelled due to COVID | | | |
| --- | 2021 | Cancelled due to COVID | | | |
| 9 | 2022 | IISER Bhopal | 21-26 Dec | IISER Bhopal | |
| 10 | 2023 | IISER TVM | 23-29 Dec | IISER Bhopal | IISc Bengaluru |
| 11 | 2024 | IISER Pune | 17-23 Dec | IISER Bhopal | IISER Pune |
| 12 | 2025 | NISER Bhubaneswar | 23-29 Dec | IISER Bhopal | IISc Bengaluru |

=== Institutes with most overall wins ===
| Institute | First win | Last win | Wins in last 5 editions | Total wins |
|---|---|---|---|---|
| IISER Bhopal | 2015 | 2025 | 5 | 7 |
| IISER Pune | 2013 | 2016 | 0 | 2 |
| IISER Mohali | 2014 | 2017 | 0 | 2 |
| IISER Kolkata | 2012 | 2012 | 0 | 1 |

== Recent championships ==
=== 12^{th} Inter IISER Sports Meet 2025 ===
The Annual Inter-IISER Sports Meet (IISM) 2025 was hosted by NISER Bhubaneswar and held from 23 December to 29 December 2025. IISER Bhopal was the overall champion for the sixth consecutive time, having won the event since 2018. IISc Bengaluru remained overall runners-up.

=== 11^{th} Inter IISER Sports Meet 2024 ===
The Annual Inter-IISER Sports Meet (IISM) 2024 was hosted by IISER Pune and held from 17 December to 23 December 2024. IISER Bhopal was the overall champion for the fifth consecutive time, having won the event since 2018. IISER Pune remained overall runners-up.
