= Vijyoshi (National Science Camp) =

Vijyoshi National Science Camp
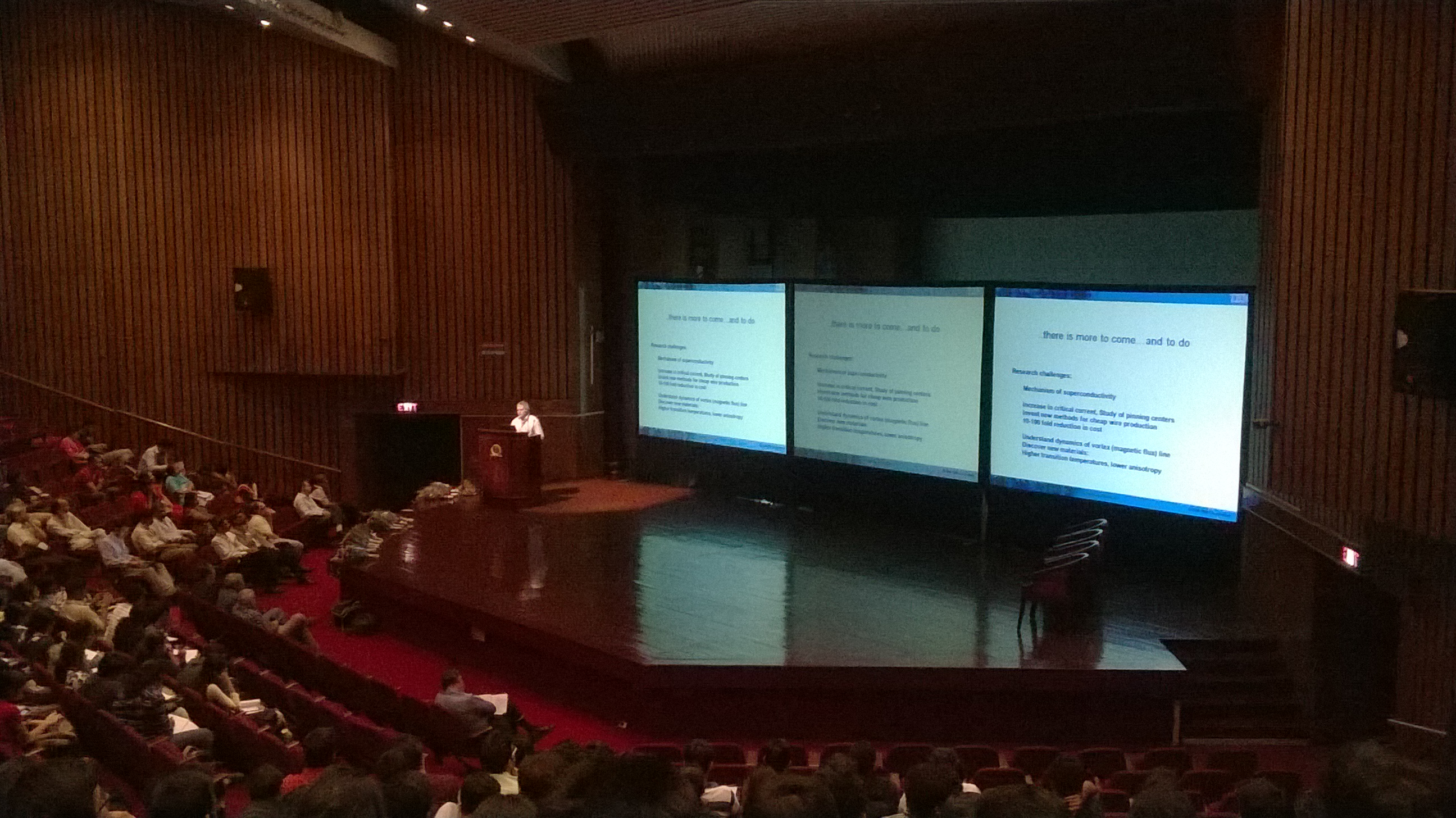
- Vigyan Jyoti Shivir
- Status: Active
- Genre: National Science Camp
- Frequency: Annual
- Venue: J N Tata Auditorium, Indian Institute of Science, IISER-Kolkata, IISER-Bhopal
- Locations: Bangalore; Kolkata
- Country: India
- Years active: 2009-present
- Inaugurated: 10 October 2009
- Founder: C.N.R Rao
- Most recent: 8 December 2019
- Participants: KVPY Fellows, INSPIRE Fellows, IISER, NISER, IIT
- Major events: Lectures, Exhibition
- Organiser: KVPY, INSPIRE, Department of Science and Technology (India)
- Website: vijyoshi.iiserkol.ac.in

Vijyoshi is an annual national science camp in India organised by KVPY in collaboration with INSPIRE programme, IISc Bangalore and IISER-Kolkata (IISER Bhopal in 2018). It is an abbreviation for Vigyan Jyoti Shivir. It started in the year 2009 and is funded by the Department of Science and Technology (India). The aim of Vijyoshi Camp is to provide a forum for interactions between bright young students and leading researchers in various branches of Science and Mathematics.

The programme includes lectures sessions followed by discussion sessions. The speakers at this camp are eminent scientists and mathematicians. Participants of this programme include KVPY fellows, INSPIRE scholars, 1st year science undergraduates studying in IISc, IISER's, IIT's, NISER and other central universities. In 2014 the camp was hosted by two institutions- IISc and IISER- Kolkata. A total of about 1200 students attended the camp in 2014.

== Vijyoshi 2014 ==
Some of the speakers for Vijyoshi 2014 included Physics Nobel Laureate Dr. Georg Bednorz, renowned Structural Chemist Prof. Gautam Radhakrishna Desiraju, and the director of the Indian Institute of Science Prof.Anurag Kumar.

Several Under Graduate Students from IISc also demonstrated over 20 experiments to the young students who visited the camp. Some of them were Non-Newtonian fluid, Stirling Engine, Leindenfrost Effect, Gyroscope, Equivalence Principle, Ripple tank and Coupled Torsional Pendulum. There were also cultural programs performed by IISc students.

== Details of Previous Camps ==
Year	Venue(s)	Co-ordinator(s)	Notable Speakers
2009	Bangalore; New Delhi	Prof. Dipankar Chatterjee; Prof. Rajendra Prasad	Prof.P. Balaram; Prof. Michael L. Klein; Prof. Richard N Zare; Prof. Amotz Zahavi; Prof.C.N.R Rao; Prof. Raghavendra Gadagkar; Prof.Richard Robert Ernst
2010	Bangalore	Prof. Dipankar Chatterjee	Prof.Madhav Gadgil; Prof. Michael L. Klein; Prof. Stuart S.P. Parkin; Prof. Andrew H Knoll; Prof. Sir Richard Friend
2011	Bangalore	Prof. S. Chandrasekaran	Prof. Anant Agarwal; Prof. S. Ramanan; Prof. D. D. Sarma; Prof. CNR Rao
2012	Bangalore	Prof. S. Chandrasekaran	Ramachandran Balasubramanian; Tom Blundell; Sir Richard Friend; Daniel Neumark; E.W. Bert Meijer; Michael R Fellows; M. S. Raghunathan; Vijayalakshmi Ravindranath
2013	Bangalore	Prof.P.K Das	Biman Bagchi; Frank Morgan; Ashoke Sen; Steven C. Zimmerman; Prof. Dieter Söll; N. Balakrishnan
2014	Bangalore; Kolkata	Prof. Kaushal Kumar Verma; Dr. Ananda Dasgupta	Gregery T. Buzzard; Anurag Kumar; Dan Stack; Erik Boettger; M. K Sanyal; Ramakrishna V. Hosur; Rohini Godbole
2015	Bangalore; Kolkata	Prof. G Mugesh; Dr. Pradipta Purkayastha; Dr. Punyasloke Bhadury	Rudi Van Eldik; Laurie J. Butler; Anant K. Menon; Raghu Kalluri; Amitava Raychaudhuri; Jainendra K. Jain; Michelle Y. Simmons; Dipankar Chatterji
2016	Bangalore Kolkata	Prof. G. Mugesh Prof. Pradipta Purakayastha	Partha Pratim Chakrabarti Rabindra Nath Mukherjee Pushpak Bhattacharyya D.D. Sarma Asok Kumar Mallik Sir Michael V. Berry Manindra Agrawal Uday Maitra Suvendra Nath Bhattachryya
2017	Bangalore Kolkata	Prof. G. Mugesh	M. S. Raghunathan Shubha Tole Sourav Pal Anil Kumar Thanu Padmanabhan Subir Sachdev Rajesh Gokhale S. Umapathy Mahan Mj
2018	Bangalore Bhopal	Prof. G. Mugesh Prof. K.N Balai Patrick D'Silva	Igor K lednev Gagandeep Kang R Balasubramanian Vasudevan Srinivas Anil Kumar Ajay K. Sood K. VijayRaghavan Kamanio Chattopadhyay T. V. Ramakrishnan David Phillips

== See also ==
- London International Youth Science Forum (U.K.)
- National Youth Science Forum (Australia)
