= Baura =

Baura may refer to:

- Baura, Ludhiana, a village in Punjab, India
- Marina Baura, Venezuelan actress

== See also ==
- Bhaura (disambiguation)
- Bauria (disambiguation)
