= Bhaur (disambiguation) =

Bhaur is a mountain range in Balochistan, Pakistan.

Bhaur may also refer to:

- Bhaur Gram, a village in Bihar, India
- Sukhdev Singh Bhaur, Indian politician; see Jagir Kaur

== See also ==
- Bhaura (disambiguation)
- Bhauri, a village in the Bhopal district of Madhya Pradesh, India
