= Vinod K. Singh =

Indian chemist and professor (born 1959)

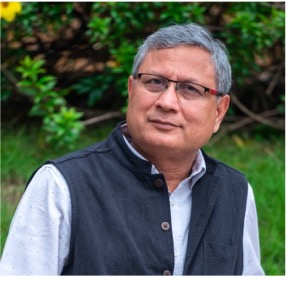
- Born: 9 September 1959 (age 66); Azamgarh, Uttar Pradesh, India
- Awards: Padma Shri (2014); Shanti Swarup Bhatnagar Prize (2004); Swarna Jayanti Fellowship (1998)
- Scientific career
- Fields: Chemistry
- Workplaces: IIT Kanpur and IISER Bhopal

Vinod K. Singh (Hindi: विनोद कुमार सिंह; born 9 September 1959) is a professor emeritus at IIT Kanpur and holds an Institute Chair position. He currently serves as Chairperson of the Research Council of CSIR–AMPRI, Bhopal; Chairperson of the CSIR-RAB; and Chairperson of the Governing Council of the Institute of Advanced Study in Science and Technology (IASST), Guwahati. He is also a member of the CSIR Society and provides mentorship to CSIR–AMPRI Bhopal and CSIR–IIIM, Jammu.

Singh's major research contribution is in the area of Synthetic Organic Chemistry, more specifically, asymmetric synthesis. He has been recognized with several awards and honors such as the Swarnajayanti Fellowship (1998), Shanti Swarup Bhatnagar Prize (2004) and the Padma Shri (2014), among others. In addition, he has been elected as a Fellow of the Indian National Science Academy (FNA), Indian Academy of Sciences (FASc), The National Academy of Sciences (FNASc), and The World Academy of Sciences (FTWAS).

Professor Singh is an Editor of an Elsevier journal - Tetrahedron Letters. He is a Member, Editorial Advisory Board of Org. Lett., J. Org. Chem., Asian J. Org. Chem., and Org. Chem. Frontiers.

He has made significant contributions in the management of higher educational institutes, science education, science policy, and planning. In 2020, he was awarded a TWAS-CASAREP award for building scientific institutions.

As a Founder Director of IISER Bhopal, for more than 10 years (2008–2018), Professor Singh set up the whole campus in 200 acres land from scratch. He has served as the Mentor Director of IISER Berhampur, Director of School of Planning and Architecture Bhopal (additional charge) and the Chairman of BoG, NITTTR Bhopal. He also held the additional charge of Director of Maulana Azad National Institute of Technology Bhopal and the Mentor Director of the Indian Institute of Information Technology Bhopal.

Professor Singh also served as a Member of the Scientific Advisory Council to the Prime Minister of India (2009–2014). Additionally, he was President of the Chemical Research Society of India (2020–2023) and Chairperson of the Governing Council of the Indian Association for the Cultivation of Science (IACS), Kolkata (2021–2024).

== Education ==
Singh had his early education from a primary school in his village area. He passed high school and intermediate from the Wesley Inter College and BSc from D. A. V College, both in Azamgarh. He did his MSc (Chemistry) from Banaras Hindu University in 1980, and joined the Malt-Chem Research Center Nandesari, Baroda, where he earned a PhD degree in 1986 under the supervision of Dr. Sukh Dev. He spent two years (1985–1986) in Canada where he worked with Professor M.H. Benn (University of Calgary) and Professor J.P. Kutney (University of British Columbia). He moved to Professor Elias James Corey's group at Harvard University in early 1987 and worked there for 3 years as a post-doctoral fellow.

== Profession ==
Singh started his career as a senior scientist in Neurogen Corporation, Connecticut, US, in March 1990. In the meantime, he accepted an offer for a faculty position from IIT Kanpur and joined the Institute in December 1990 as an assistant professor in chemistry. He was promoted to associate professor in 1997 and professor in 2001. He came from IIT Kanpur to start IISER Bhopal in the year 2008 as a Founder Director and was there for 10 years. He served as a Director/Mentor Director in Institutes such as School of Planning and Architecture, IISER Berhampur, Maulana Azad National Institute of Technology Bhopal, and IIIT Bhopal. He also served as a chairperson of the BoG in NITTR (National Institute of Technical Teachers Training & Research). Currently, he is serving as the chairman of the Governing Council at the Indian Association for the Cultivation of Science, Kolkata.

== Awards and honours ==
- Padma Shri (2014)
- Shanti Swarup Bhatnagar Award (2004)
- Distinguished Alumnus Award, Banaras Hindu University (2012)
- Samman Patra by UP Government (2018)
- Swarnajayanti Fellowship Award (1998)
- J.C. Bose fellowship (2009–2023)
- Goyal Prize (2011)
- Fellow, Indian National Science Academy (FNA)
- Fellow, Indian Academy of Sciences (FASc)
- Fellow, National Academy of Sciences (FNASc)
- Fellow, The World Academy of Sciences (FTWAS)
- Fellow, Royal Society of Chemistry (FRSC)
- Chemical Research Society of India Silver Medal (2014)
- Vigyan Ratna Award of U.P. (2006)
- Adjunct Professor, NIPER Hyderabad (12.10.2019 – Present)
- Director's Chair Professor, IISER Bhopal (01.01.2019 – Present)
- S. Ranganathan Memorial Medal by Indian National Science Academy (2018)
- DSc (Honoris Causa), Jabalpur University (2012)
- Pt Jawahar Lal Nehru National Award by MP Govt (2010)
- Umang Gupta Chair Professor, IIT Kanpur (01.06.2007 – 30.05.2010)
- Chemical Research Society of India Bronze Medal (2003)
- Rajib Goyal Prize (2002)
