= Indian Institute of Science Education and Research, Berhampur =

Higher educational institute in Odisha, India

- ଭାରତୀୟ ବିଜ୍ଞାନ ଶିକ୍ଷା ଏବଂ ଗବେଷଣା ସଂସ୍ଥାନ, ବ୍ରହ୍ମପୁର
- Type: Public university
- Established: 2016
- Budget: ₹160.77 crore (US$17 million) (FY2024–25 est.)
- Chairperson: Prof. (Retd.) Arvind A. Natu,Chairperson BoG, IISER Kolkata(Additional charge of Chairperson BoG, IISER Berhampur)
- Director: Ashok Kumar Ganguli
- Academic staff: 96
- Students: 1,199
- Undergraduates: 853
- Postgraduates: 62
- Doctoral students: 284
- Location: Laudigam, Konisi, Golanthara, Ganjam district, Odisha, India-760003; 19.1999921°N 84.8351025°E
- Campus: Coastal area 200 acres (81 ha)
- Nickname: IISER-BPR
- Website: www.iiserbpr.ac.in

Indian Institute of Science Education and Research, Berhampur (IISER Berhampur) Odia: ଭାରତୀୟ ବିଜ୍ଞାନ ଶିକ୍ଷା ଏବଂ ଗବେଷଣା ସଂସ୍ଥାନ, ବ୍ରହ୍ମପୁର is an autonomous public research and science education institute in Berhampur, Odisha, India. Established in 2016, the institute is one of the 7 IISERs established by the Ministry of Human Resource Development. IISER Berhampur is recognized as an Institute of National Importance by the Government of India. The institute started functioning from the 2016–17 academic year in August. IISER Berhampur offers a Bachelor of Science and Master of Science (BS-MS) dual-degree, Doctor of Philosophy (Ph.D.), and Integrated Ph.D. (i-Ph.D.) degrees in Mathematics, Physics, Chemistry, Biology, and Earth Sciences. Students can also pursue minors in fields such as Data Sciences, Bioengineering, and Engineering Physics. Additionally, IISER Berhampur provides opportunities for post-doctoral positions and various other roles, including Research Associate and Junior Research Fellow (JRF) project fellow.

== History ==
The Indian Institutes of Science Education and Research (IISERs) were created in 2006 through a proclamation of the Indian government's Ministry of Human Resource Development, with the mandate to combine advanced scientific research with undergraduate in the basic sciences—reversing a long-standing post-independence policy that had kept teaching (in colleges and universities) and research (in specialised institutes) largely separate. IISERs first opened in Pune and Kolkata in 2006, followed by Mohali (2007) and Bhopal and Thiruvananthapuram (2008).

IISER Tirupati (2015) and IISER Berhampur (2016) followed roughly a decade later as the sixth and seventh institutes in the system. IISER Berhampur began functioning from the 2016–17 academic year, initially operating from a transit campus in Berhampur, with IISER Bhopal serving as its mentor institute until a director was appointed. In October 2018, the Union Cabinet approved funding for a permanent campus, which was constructed at Laudigam in Ganjam district and formally dedicated to the nation by Prime Minister in February 2024.

Each IISER is a degree-granting autonomous institution and was declared an Institute of National Importance by Act of Parliament in 2012.

== Campus ==
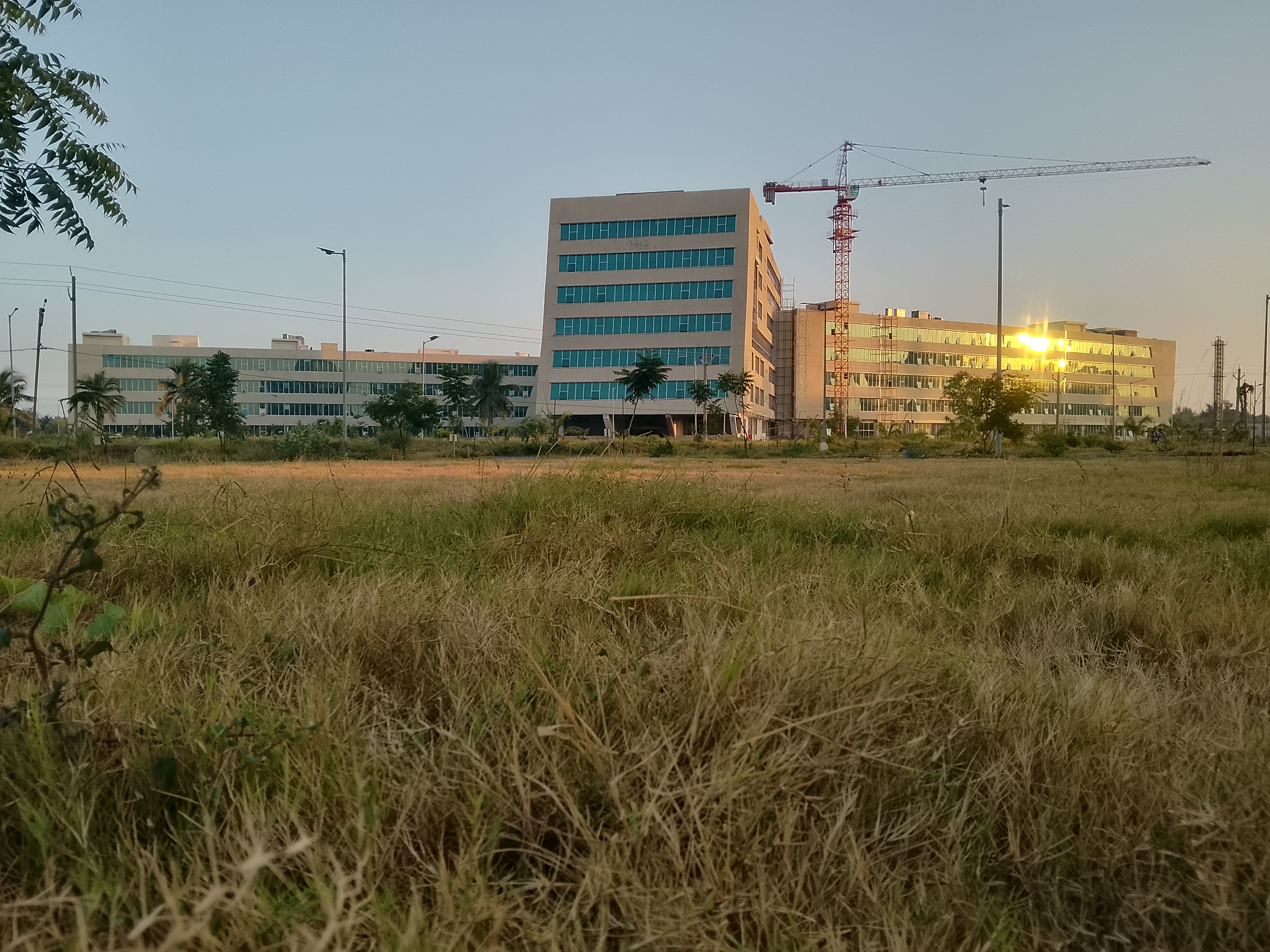
IISER Berhampur Academic block

The main academic block of IISER Berhampur is constructed as a single monolithic structure to embody the interdisciplinary philosophy of modern research. By housing the biological, chemical, earth, physical, and mathematical sciences within one unified building, the design is intended to facilitate seamless academic collaboration. Furthermore, the campus master plan is explicitly future-proofed to prevent institutional saturation, ensuring scalable infrastructure for the addition of new laboratories and advanced scientific instrumentation. Designed with monolithic poured concrete structures, the buildings are engineered to withstand high cyclonic wind speeds.

=== Sports ===
The campus has a 8-lane 400m athletic track, which loops around the well maintained football field. The campus has multiple basket ball courts, one in boys hostel one in the girls hostel. The boys hostel houses the gym open to all students with all advanced equipments. Multiple tennis courts are present in the sports complex along with the athletic track.

== Academic programs ==
IISER Berhampur offers its flagship five-year BS–MS dual degree programme, comprising four years of undergraduate study leading to a Bachelor of Science (BS) degree, followed by a one-year Master's research thesis/dissertation leading to a Master of Science (MS) degree. The institute also offers Integrated PhD (iPhD) and PhD programmes.

Admission to the BS-MS program is only via the IISER Aptitude Test (IAT) administered by Joint Admissions Committee. Earlier, JEE (Advanced) and KVPY ranks could also be used for taking admission in UG programs. For the PhD programs, candidates can apply with either a master's degree in science or a bachelor's degree for the integrated PhD program. Applicants are screened through interviews and must have qualified a national level entrance exam for the PhD program in science, such as CSIR-NET, GATE, NBHM, or JGEEBILS.

The faculty at IISER Berhampur is organized into various disciplines, including Biology, Chemistry, Mathematics, Physics, Data Science, and Earth & Environmental Sciences. Interdisciplinary research is encouraged across these disciplines.

=== Labs and advanced scientific instrumentation ===
IISER Berhampur provides advanced infrastructure for interdisciplinary scientific research. For structural and molecular analysis, the facility houses 400, 500, and 700 MHz NMR spectrometers (equipped with cryoprobes) alongside single-crystal and powder X-ray diffractometers. In quantum materials and condensed matter physics, characterization is driven by a 400 mK ultra-high vacuum scanning tunneling microscope (UHV-STM) equipped with a 3-axis vector magnet, SQUID magnetic property measurement systems (MPMS), physical property measurement systems (PPMS), X-ray photoelectron spectroscopy (XPS), an electron probe microanalyzer (EPMA), and pulsed laser deposition (PLD) systems with in situ monitoring and ellipsometry. Advanced imaging and microscopy capabilities integrate a 200 kV cryogenic electron microscopy (Cryo-EM), high-resolution transmission electron microscopy (HR-TEM), field-emission scanning electron microscopy (FESEM), atomic force microscopy (AFM), live-cell confocal microscopy, and a preclinical 3T MRI. Finally, chemical profiling and biological dynamics are analyzed utilizing comprehensive mass spectrometry (triple quadrupole LC-MS/MS, GC-MS, HRMS, Q-ICP-MS), ICP-OES, X-ray fluorescence (XRF), flow cytometry (FACS), femtosecond transient absorption spectroscopy (fs-TAS), time-correlated single photon counting (TCSPC), Raman microscopy, isothermal titration calorimetry (ITC), differential scanning calorimetry (DSC), and multispectral optoacoustic tomography (MSOT), all supported by a dedicated high-performance computing (HPC) cluster and an in-house liquid nitrogen plant.

== See also ==
- Indian Institutes of Science Education and Research
