= Bhaura =

Bhaura may refer to:

- Bhaura, Nawanshahr, a village in Punjab, India
- Kulbir Bhaura, Indian field hockey player
- Jathedar Sadhu Singh Bhaura, Indian Sikh missionary
- Bhan Singh Bhaura (1934–2004), Indian politician

== See also ==
- Bhaur (disambiguation)
- Bhanwara, a 1944 Indian film
- Bhaurao, an Indian male given name
