= NYSF =

NYSF may stand for:

- National Youth Science Forum, an Australian STEM outreach programme
- New York Shakespeare Festival, now known as Shakespeare in the Park, a theatrical program in Central Park, New York City
