= National Science Summer School Inc. =

- Company type: Non-profit organisation
- Founded: 5 June 1984
- Headquarters: Canberra, Australia
- Website: www.nsss.org.au

The National Science Summer School Inc. is the council that reviews and appoints staff that run the National Youth Science Forum in Australia.

== See also ==
- Rodney Jory
