= Chengel railway station =

Railway station in West Bengal, India

Chengel

General information
- Location: Chengail Station, Chakashi, Chengel, Howrah district, West Bengal; India
- Coordinates: 22°29′11″N 88°08′17″E
- Elevation: 8 metres (26 ft)
- System: Kolkata Suburban Railway station
- Owner: Indian Railways
- Line: Howrah–Kharagpur line
- Platforms: 4

Construction
- Structure type: Standard on-ground station
- Parking: No
- Cycle facilities: yes

Other information
- Station code: CGA
- Fare zone: South Eastern Railway

History
- Opened: 1900
- Electrified: 1967–69

Services
| Preceding station | Kolkata Suburban Railway | Following station |
|---|---|---|
| Phuleswar towards Midnapore | South Eastern Line Howrah–Kharagpur line | Bauria towards Howrah Junction |
Route map
Location
- Location within West Bengal

The Chengel railway station in the Indian state of West Bengal, serves Chengel, India in Howrah district. It is on the Howrah–Kharagpur line. It is 27 km (17 mi) from Howrah Station.

== History ==
The Howrah–Kharagpur line was opened in 1900.

== Tracks ==
The Howrah–Panskura stretch has three lines.

== Electrification ==
The Howrah–Kharagpur line was electrified in 1967–69.
