= Isabel Esaín-García =

Biochemist, researcher and violagambist

Isabel Esaín
- Born: Isabel Esaín García; 16 March 1998 (age 28); Zaragoza, Spain
- Education: Imperial College London, University of Cambridge
- Occupation: Cancer researcher
- Known for: Control of oncogenesis

Isabel Esaín García (born 16 March 1998 in Zaragoza) is a Spanish biochemist, a PhD in Chemical Sciences and a cancer researcher, as well as a violagambist.

== Academic background ==
She studied at the IES Ítaca in Zaragoza and then moved to London, where she studied biochemistry at Imperial College and music at the Royal College of Music. Later she completed her PhD at the University of Cambridge, with a PhD thesis on genome and epigenomic engineering applied to DNA.

== Research ==
She developed her research career during her doctorate with professors Shankar Balasubramanian and David Tannahill, focusing on the structure of DNA and in particular on gene regulation. Following this, she developed an innovative method to control oncogenes, which, when mutated, trigger the formation of tumors. This technique allows genes to be "turned on" or "turned off" with great precision, thus opening up a new range of possibilities for the treatment of cancer and other genetic diseases. The discovery of this mechanism earned her the 2024 award for the best doctoral thesis, an award given annually by Cancer Research UK (CRUK), a Cambridge institute dedicated to Cancer Research in the United Kingdom.

== Future Projects ==
She currently works as a postdoctoral researcher at the University of California (Berkeley, United States) in the research group led by Jennifer Doudna, Nobel Prize in Chemistry in 2020. One of her future goals is to promote the creation of an institute for personalized medicine in her homeland (Aragon, Spain), which would continue her research and offer new therapeutic solutions to cancer patients. To this end, she has maintained contacts with leading Aragonese authorities.

At the same time, she has developed a musical career as a viol performer, an instrument she began playing at the age of seven at the Zaragoza Professional Music Conservatory.

== Publications ==
=== As sole author ===
- «Deciphering the cancer genome and epigenome» (2023)

=== As co-author ===
- «G-quadruplex DNA structure is a positive regulator of MYC transcription» (2024), Esain-Garcia I, Kirchner A, Melidis L, Tavares RCA, Dhir S, Simeone A, Yu Z, Madden SK, Hermann R, Tannahill D, Balasubramanian S. Proc Natl Acad Sci USA. 2024 Feb 13;121(7)
- «Transcription-coupled repair of DNA-protein cross-links depends on CSA and CSB» (2024), Carnie CJ, Acampora AC, Bader AS, Erdenebat C, Zhao S, Bitensky E, van den Heuvel D, Parnas A, Gupta V, D'Alessandro G, Sczaniecka-Clift M, Weickert P, Aygenli F, Götz MJ, Cordes J, Esain-Garcia I, Melidis L, Wondergem AP, Lam S, Robles MS, Balasubramanian S, Adar S, Luijsterburg MS, Jackson SP, Stingele J. Nat Cell Biol. 2024 May;26(5):797-810
- «Directed evolution expands CRISPR-Cas12a genome-editing capacity» (2025), Ma E, Chen K, Shi H, Wasko KM, Esain-Garcia I, Trinidad MI, Zhou K, Ye J, Doudna JA. Nucleic Acids Res. 2025 Jul 8;53(13)
- «SCoTCH-seq reveals that 5-hydroxymethylcytosine encodes regulatory information across DNA strands» (2025), Hardwick JS, Dhir S, Kirchner A, Simeone A, Flynn SM, Edgerton JM, de Cesaris Araujo Tavares R, Esain-Garcia I, Tannahill D, Golder P, Monahan JM, Gosal WS, Balasubramanian S. Proc Natl Acad Sci U S A. 2025 Aug 5;122(31)

== Awards and distinctions ==
- Participant in the Stockholm International Youth Science Seminar (SIYSS) (2023).
- Award for the best doctoral thesis from Cancer Research UK (CRUK) (2024).
