= Rodney Jory =

Australian physicist (1938–2021)

Rodney Leonard Jory
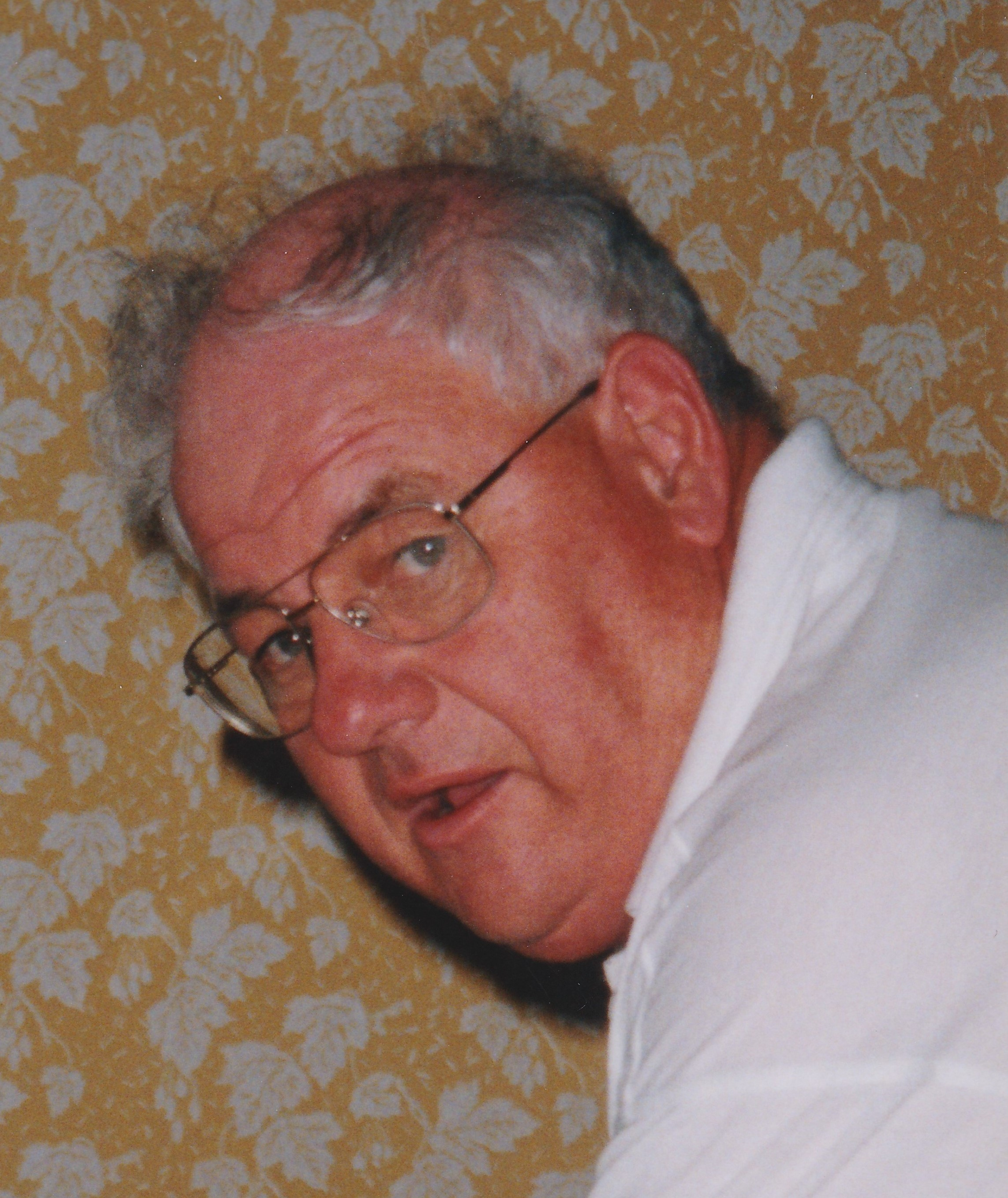
- Born: Rodney Leonard Jory; 26 November 1938; Adelaide, Australia
- Died: 14 October 2021 (aged 82); Merimbula

Rodney Leonard (Rod) Jory AM, (26 November 1938 – 14 October 2021), was an Australian physicist noted for establishing and running the National Youth Science Forum (NYSF/NSSS) and for his contributions to Australian teams which have competed at the International Physics Olympiad. He retired from the position of director of the NYSF in January 2005. He died in 2021 in Merimbula, New South Wales, at the age of 82.

== Education ==
Born and bred in Adelaide, after beginning his high schooling at Woodville High School (1951), Professor Jory then attended Prince Alfred College (1952–1955). His university education began at the University of Adelaide with a Bachelor of Science degree with honours (1956–1960). This was followed with a PhD from The Australian National University (1960–1964).

His PhD was completed under the guidance of Professor L. G. H. Huxley and Dr R. W. Crompton, initially at the University of Adelaide and then transferring to the Australian National University. The research focussed on the drift velocities and diffusion coefficients of electrons in nitrogen, hydrogen and helium.

== University career ==
Professor Jory has taught at a number of Australian and overseas universities, most extensively at The Australian National University and the University of Canberra. His career history is as follows:

- 1964, technical assistant, Research School of Physical Sciences, Australian National University
- 1965, senior demonstrator, Department of Physics, Australian National University
- 1965–1966, research associate, Florida State University
- 1967–1968, lecturer, University of Liverpool
- 1969, lecturer, University of New England
- 1970–1973, senior lecturer, Canberra College of Advanced Education
- 1974–1984, registrar, Canberra College of Advanced Education
- 1985–1989, principal lecturer, Canberra College of Advanced Education
- 1989–?, visiting fellow, Australian National University
- 1990–?, associate professor, University of Canberra
- 2006, visiting lecturer, University of Sussex
- 2007, visiting lecturer, University of Vienna
- 2008, professor University of British Columbia

== NSSS / NYSF ==
In Australia, Professor Jory is well known for his involvement with the National Science Summer School (which was renamed the National Youth Science Forum in 1996). He assumed the role of director at its inception, and stayed in that position for 21 years (1984–2005).

== Major awards ==
- 1990, Rotary District 9710 Vocational Excellence Medal for work as Director of the NSSS since 1984.
- 1992, Rotary International Certificate of Appreciation and Commendation for exemplary service to the Programs of Rotary.
- 1997, Member of the Order of Australia (AM).
- 1997, Australian Institute of Physics Award for Outstanding Service to Physics in Australia
- 1999, finalist in The Michael Daley Eureka Prize for the Promotion of Science, awarded by the Australian Museum.

== Miscellaneous ==
- Fellow of the Australian Institute of Physics
- ACT Justice of the Peace
- Flying Officer, (Royal Australian Air Force), retired
- Executive member, Australian Soccer Federation, various years, 1960–1979

== Scientific publications ==
- Jory, R.; Crompton, R. W. (1962). "On the Swarm Method for Determining the Ratio of Electron Drift Velocity to Diffusion Coefficient". Aust. J. Phys. 15 (4): 451. Bibcode:1962AuJPh..15..451C. doi:10.1071/PH620451.
- Jory, R.; Rees, J. A. (1964). "The Diffusion of Electrons in Dry, Carbon Dioxide Free Air". Aust. J. Phys. 17 (3): 307. Bibcode:1964AuJPh..17..307R. doi:10.1071/PH640307.
- Jory, Rodney (June 1965). The motion of electrons in crossed electric and magnetic fields. Canberra: Australian National University.
- Jory, R. (1965). "Transport Coefficients for Low Energy Electrons in Crossed Electric and Magnetic Fields". Aust. J. Phys. 18 (3): 237. Bibcode:1965AuJPh..18..237J. doi:10.1071/PH650237.
- Jory, R.; Rees, J. A. & Crompton, R. W. (1965). "The Diffusion and Attachment of Electrons in Water Vapour". Aust. J. Phys. 18 (6): 541. Bibcode:1965AuJPh..18..541C. doi:10.1071/PH650541.
- Jory, R. & Crompton, R. W. (1965). "The Momentum-Transfer Cross Section for Low Energy Electrons in Helium". Proc. 4th International Conference on Physics of Electronic and Atomic Collisions. Quebec.
- Jory, R.; Crompton, R. W. & Elford, M. T. (1967). "The Momentum Transfer Cross Section for Electrons in Helium". Aust. J. Phys. 20 (4): 369. Bibcode:1967AuJPh..20..369C. doi:10.1071/PH670369.

== Press articles ==
- The Australian National University media release 28 January 1997
- Rotary Down Under issue No 447 December 2003 January 2004

== See also ==
- National Youth Science Forum
- International Physics Olympiad
