= National Youth Science Forum =

Australian STEM outreach programme

- Company type: non-profit organisation
- Founded: 1984
- Headquarters: Canberra, Australia
- Key people: Dr Melanie Bagg (director), Patricia Kelly (chair)
- Website: nysf.edu.au

The National Youth Science Forum (NYSF) is a summer school programme dedicated to Year 11 students who are heading into Year 12 and trying to pursue careers in science, engineering and related disciplines. They are also given training in public speaking. Until 1995, it was known as the National Science Summer School (NSSS).

The Forum is a residential program that takes place in January in Canberra and Brisbane. Activities are supervised by student staff and resident Rotary International counselors. The program is advertised to have little time for outside activities, except for meeting people in the program.

Some students from New Zealand, South Africa, and the United Kingdom are involved.

== History ==
The NSSS was funded in 1983 by the Canberra Development Board with assistance from Canberra and outside organisations, including Rotary, the Australian National University (ANU), the Commonwealth Scientific and Industrial Research Organisation (CSIRO) and the Canberra College of Advanced Education (CCAE) (now the University of Canberra). The concept was developed by Mr. Neville Whiffen, then Chairman of the Canberra Development Board, with the support of members of Rotary in District 968, Sydney, and was organised by the staff of the CCAE.

The first NSSS was held in January 1984, with 198 students selected from Australia. Mainstays of the program were Mr. Bob Mitchell (subsequently Assistant Vice-Chancellor of the University of Canberra), Mr. Ian Frencham (formerly CCAE, now retired), Dr. Rodney Jory (University of Canberra, the founding director of the NYSF), Mr. and Mrs. Ken Shields (Rotary Club of St. Ives, Sydney), Mr. and Mrs. Ted Armstrong (Rotary, Canberra) and six Rotarian couples, "house parents", one couple from each state in Australia.

The NSSS was incorporated on 5 June 1984, a council set up and a director appointed.

In 1985, NSSS introduced specialised activity groups for the first time.

In 1990, CRA Limited advised that it would support the NSSS financially, providing $120,000, and the NSSS became "The CRA National Science Summer School". The number increased to 144 per session.

In 1991, the NSSS saw the introduction of graduate seminars where students were able to question former students of the NSSS, who have now graduated, on their career choices. In 1992, the NSSS saw all student staff brought to Canberra during the Easter break of 1991 and given additional training.

In January 1995, the NSSS changed its name to "NYSF", and in September of that same year, Mrs. Sandra Meek joined the staff of the NSSS Inc., taking over the responsibility of maintaining the student database from Mrs. Ada Meek.

January 1997 was the last CRA NYSF, as CRA Limited and RTZ Plc were later in the year merged to form Rio Tinto, and this was to be the future prefix. Rio Tinto announced that January 1999 was to be its last year of full sponsorship (at $200,000) and that the sponsorship would be halved for January 2000 and drop to $25,000 thereafter. Rio Tinto made $25,000 available to assist with a sponsorship search and provided two weekends of professional seminars. The council set an initial target of $400,000 for January 2001 and saw this as made up of eight University sponsors and eight industry sponsors each at $25,000 per year.

In January 2000, for the first time, NYSF had a "National Youth Science Forum" with no sponsor name.

In November 2000, Mrs. Ada Meek retired from the office after being with the NYSF for 17 years. With a full-time replacement for Ada and the Director, NSSS Inc. employed, from December 2000, four full-time staff and a part-time accountant.

In 2005, after years of dedication to the program, the Director, Prof. Rod Jory, retired and was replaced by Geoff Burchfield. Geoff was previously the head of CSIRO’s Media Unit in Canberra.

The 2010 NYSF has a third session being held in Perth.

After 8 years at the helm of the organisation, Geoff Burchfield stepped down as Director in 2013 to focus on program development for the NYSF. His successor was Damien Pearce.

During the 2017 session, it was announced that a third session was to open in 2018. This is to be hosted at the University of Queensland in Brisbane.

== Application process ==
Applications are open to all Year 11 students who are permanent residents of Australia. Applications close 31 May each year for the following January forum. Rotary International selects a number of pupils that they will sponsor to go to the forum, which includes an interview and, depending on schools and rotary clubs, examinations.

== See also ==
- London International Youth Science Forum
- Asian Science Camp
- National Science Camp
- Stockholm International Youth Science Seminar
- Canada-Wide Science Fair
