= Clare Elwell =

British academic

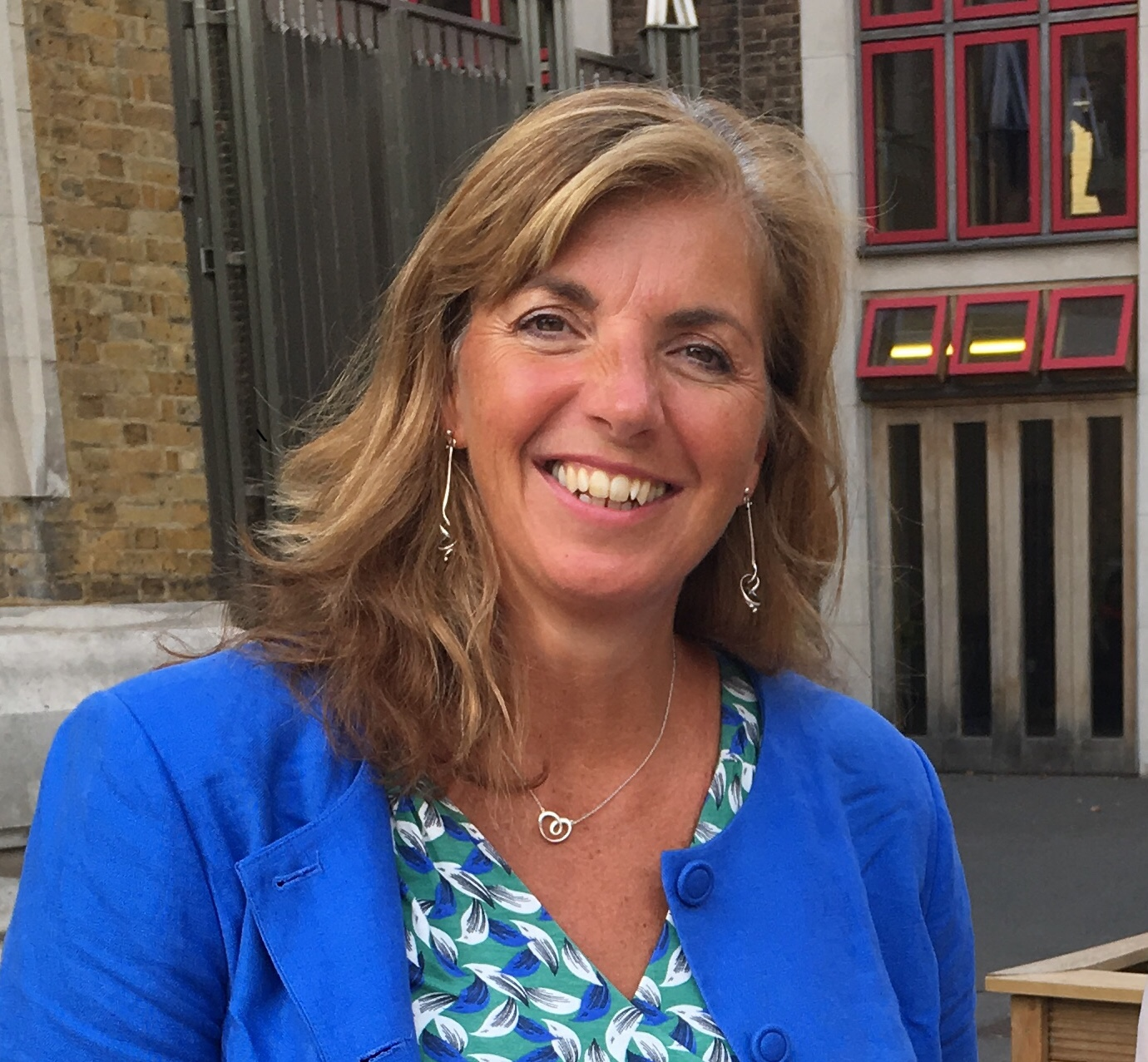
- Education: University of Exeter (B.Sc., M.Phil.); University College London (Ph.D.)
- Scientific career
- Institutions: University College London
- Thesis: Measurement and Data Analysis Techniques for the Investigation of Adult Cerebral Haemodynamics (1995)
- Doctoral advisor: Mark Cope; David Delpy
- Website: www.ucl.ac.uk/medphys/contacts/people/celwell

Clare Elwell is a British academic who is a professor of medical physics and director of the Near Infrared Spectroscopy Group within the Biomedical Optics Research Laboratory at University College London. She has served as president of both the International Society on Oxygen Transport to Tissue and the Society for Functional Near Infrared Spectroscopy.

Elwell has received a number of awards including the Women in Science and Engineering Research Award, the Medical Research Council Science Suffrage Award, and the Melvin H. Knisely International Young Scientist Award from the International Society on Oxygen Transport to Tissue.

== Education and career ==
Elwell attended the London International Youth Science Forum in 1984 and from this was inspired to study medical physics. She received a Bachelor of Science degree in physics and medical physics at the University of Exeter in 1988. She remained in Exeter to work as a clinical physicist in The Royal Devon and Exeter Hospital, obtaining a MPhil in 1991 researching measurements in the diagnosis and treatment of obstructive sleep apnoea. She left her job as a clinical physicist to work as a research fellow in the neonatal intensive care research team at the Paediatrics Department of University College London.

Elwell worked under David Delpy and Mark Cope developing non-invasive tools that used near-infrared light to measure newborn brain function in the neonatal intensive care unit. During this period she also pioneered the use of near infrared spectroscopy to measure blood flow in the adult brain. In 1995, she received her PhD and won the Melvin H. Knisely International Young Scientist Award from the International Society on Oxygen Transport to Tissue.

In 1996, she received a Medical Research Council Non Clinical Research Training Fellowship in the Department of Medical Physics and Bioengineering at University College London, moving to lecturer in 1999 and senior lecturer in 2005 in the same department. In 2008, she became a professor of medical physics and in 2016 she won the Women in Science and Engineering Research Award.

Elwell was president of International Society on Oxygen Transport to Tissue in 2014. She is the co-founder and current President of the Society for Functional Near Infrared Spectroscopy. In 2017, Elwell was appointed the President of the London International Youth Science Forum.

== Research ==
Elwell has led a number of interdisciplinary teams developing optical methods for monitoring tissue oxygenation, haemodynamics and metabolism in brain and muscle. Her research projects have included studies of brain development, acute brain injury in adults and infants, sports performance, paediatric cardiology, malaria, infant brain development and malnutrition. Her work delivered the first images of mitochondrial cytochrome oxidase in the adult and infant brain. She is the lead physicist in a collaboration with neurodevelopmental psychologists at the Centre for Brain and Cognitive Development at Birkbeck, University of London investigating the use of near infrared spectroscopy to deliver an early marker of autism.

Elwell currently leads the Brain Imaging for Global HealTh (BRIGHT) research project funded by the Bill and Melinda Gates Foundation. BRIGHT investigates the impact of malnutrition on early infant brain development and recently reported the first ever imaging of the infant brain in Africa. Through this work she established the GlobalfNIRS initiative to support the use of functional near infrared spectroscopy in global health projects.

== Public engagement ==
Elwell is committed to engaging the public in her research with a particular emphasis on enthusing young aspiring scientists via talks and demonstrations at schools and science festivals. She exhibited "Shedding Light on the Human Body" at the 2006 Royal Society Summer Science Exhibition and has performed at Pint of Science and Science Show Off. She won the University College London Provost Public Engagement Award in 2011 and the University College London Engineering Engager of the Year Award in 2018. In 2018 she became a British Science Association Media Fellow, seconded to the Financial Times, London.

She is a founder and Trustee of the Young Scientists for Africa charity. She was inspired to create this charity to give African science students the opportunity to attend the London International Youth Science Forum as she did as a student.

== Women in science ==
Elwell contributes to a range of women in science and women in leadership initiatives. She won the Medical Research Council Science Suffrage Award in 2013 and the UK Inspirational Teacher Award for Women in 2014. She was one of the featured scientists in the Royal Society's Mothers in Science Project.
