= Bauria (disambiguation) =

Bauria may refer to:

- Bauria, an extinct genus of reptiles
- Bauria people, an ethnic group of India
- Bauria language, a language of India
- Bauria railway station, in Kolkata, India
- Vaghri language, an Indic language of Pakistan, also known as Bauria
