= London International Youth Science Forum =

London International Youth Science Forum LIYSF
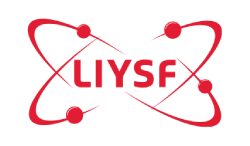
- Genre: Not-For-profit Scientific Forum
- Frequency: Yearly
- Location: Imperial College London
- Country: United Kingdom
- Inaugurated: 1959
- Participants: 500
- Area: London, United Kingdom
- Leader: Richard Myhill
- Patron: HRH The Princess Royal
- People: Clare Elwell (President)
- Sponsor: UNESCO
- Website: www.liysf.org.uk

The London International Youth Science Forum is a two week residential forum held at Imperial College London and The Royal Geographical Society.

== Overview ==
Each year almost 500 students aged 16–21 years attend the forum from both the United Kingdom and overseas.

The event hosts lectures and demonstrations from leading scientists, as well as visits to industrial sites, research centres, scientific institutions and organisations, including world class laboratories and universities, including Cambridge and Oxford universities. Students interact with "experts at the top of their fields". The conference also emphasises inter-cultural communication through various social events

In 2016 LIYSF was granted UNESCO patronage.

== History ==
The idea of a science forum was considered after World War II, and was realized in the form of student exchanges between different schools and communities in the United Kingdom, the Netherlands, Denmark, and Czechoslovakia. In 1959, writing that "out of like interests the strongest interests grow", Philip Green initiated a coordinated programme housing all participants at the University of London.

In the next decades, the conference expanded across the globe, starting from the United States of America to Eastern Asian countries. The initial goal was to "put science into perspective and to encourage those attending to be aware of the needs of the world and what was happening in disciplines other than the one they were studying".

Speakers at LIYSF include well-known scientists and policymakers.

== Reception ==
The Forum has received acknowledgement from world leaders. David Cameron, former Prime Minister, described LIYSF as "a fantastic opportunity for young scientists from all over the world to come together... and engage in a program designed to educate, stimulate and inspire". The Director-General of the United Nations Educational, Scientific and Cultural Organization, Irina Bokova, notes that LIYSF exhibits "a commendable understanding of how science and culture go hand in hand, while sharing knowledge and experiences".

== Support ==
Support is primarily provided by, amongst other organizations and groups, the British Council, Education UK and the GREAT Campaign.

== See also ==
- Asian Science Camp
- National Science Camp (India)
- National Youth Science Forum (Australia)
- Stockholm International Youth Science Seminar (SIYSS)
