= S. Murty Srinivasula =

Indian cell biologist

Prof. S. Murty Srinivasula
- Prof. S. Murty Srinivasula
- Born: 1963 (age 62–63)
- Education: Banaras Hindu University; Andhra University; National Cancer Institute; Thomas Jefferson University; Einstein Medical Center Philadelphia
- Known for: Studies on novel regulators of Apoptosis and Autophagy
- Scientific career
- Fields: Biology, cell biology, apoptosis, autophagy
- Workplaces: Indian Institute of Science Education and Research, Thiruvananthapuram; National Cancer Institute

Srinivasa Murty Srinivasula (born 1963) is an Indian cell biologist, a professor at the School of Biology and Director of Indian Institute of Science Education and Research, Thiruvananthapuram in Kerala, India. His research field is apoptosis, autophagy and oncology.

== Life and career ==
Professor Murty received his B.Sc and M.Sc degrees from Andhra University and his PhD from the Banaras Hindu University in Varanasi, India. He later moved to the Thomas Jefferson University as a research associate and became an instructor at the Sidney Kimmel Cancer Centre at Thomas Jefferson University in Philadelphia, United States. During 2003–2012, he was the principal investigator at National Cancer Institute, NIH, Bethesda. He was Professor-in-charge (administration) at the IISER Thiruvananthapuram, as well as a member of the IISER TVM Senate. He also served on several institute committees. Previously, he served as Deputy Director of institue. Currently, he is Director of Indian Institute of Science Education and Research, Thiruvananthapuram in Kerala, India.

== Key awards and distinctions ==
Professor Murty has received the following awards:

- Kimmel Scholar (2003-2005), The Sidney Kimmel Foundation for Cancer Research, Baltimore, MD
- Special Fellow (2000-2003), The Leukemia and Lymphoma Society, New York, NY
- Young Scientist Travel Award, American Association for Cancer Research, Inc. Philadelphia
- Research Fellowships (1987-1992), University Grants Commission (India)
- National Merit Scholarships (1984 -1986), Department of Education, Government of India, New Delhi

== Publications ==
Professor Murty has published around 100 papers and reviews in international scientific journals.

=== Key publications ===
1. Gan X, Wang J, Wang C, Sommer E, Kozasa T, Srinivasula S, Alessi D, Offermanns S, Simon MI, Wu D. (2012). PRR5L degradation promotes mTORC2-mediated PKC-δ phosphorylation and cell migration downstream of Gα (12). Nat. Cell Biol
2. Li, P., Nijhawan, D., Budihardjo, I., Srinivasula, S. M., Ahmad, M., Alnemri, E. S., & Wang, X. (1997). Cytochrome c and dATP-Dependent Formation of Apaf-1/Caspase-9 Complex Initiates an Apoptotic Protease Cascade. Cell, 91(4), 479–489.
3. Fujita K and Srinivasula SM. (2011). TLR4-mediated autophagy in macrophages is a p62-dependent type of selective autophagy of aggresome-like induced structures (ALIS). Autophagy, 7: 29–31.
4. Fujita K, Xiao Q, Maeda D and Srinivasula SM. (2011). Nrf2-mediated induction of p62 controls TLR4-driven ALIS formation and autophagic degradation, Proc Nat Acad Sci, USA, 108: 1427–32.
5. Shukla S, Fujita K, Xiao Q, and Srinivasula SM. (2011). A shear stress responsive gene product PP1201 protects against Fas-mediated apoptosis by reducing Fas expression on the cell surface. Apoptosis, 16: 162–173.
6. Liao, W, Fujita K, Xiao Q, Tchikov V, Yang W, Gunsor, M, Garfield S, Goldsmith, P. El-Deiry WS, Schutze S, and Srinivasula SM. (2009). CARP1 Regulates Induction of NF-κB by TNF-a. Current Biology. 19: R17-R19
7. Liao, W, Xiao Q, Tchikov V, Fujita K, Yang W, Wincovitch S, Garfield S, Schutze S, El-Deiry WS, and Srinivasula SM. (2008). CARP-2 is an endosome-associated ubiquitin ligase for RIP and regulates TNF-induced NF-?B activation. Current Biology (article). 18: 641–9.
8. Srinivasula SM, Jones JM., Datta P., Ji W., Gupta S., Zhang Z., Davies E., Hajnóczky G., Saunders TL., Van Keuren ML., Alnemri T., Meisler ML and Alnemri ES. (2003). Loss of Omi/HtrA2 protease activity causes the neuromuscular disorder of mnd2 mutant mice. Nature. 425: 721–727.
9. Srinivasula SM, Datta P, Kobayashi M, Wu J-W, Fujioka M, Hegde R, Zhang Z, Mukattash, Fernandes-Alnemri T, Shi Y, Jaynes JB, Alnemri ES. (2002). Sickle, a novel Drosophila death gene in the reaper/hid/grim region encodes an IAP-inhibitory protein. Curr Biol. 12: 125–30.
10. Srinivasula SM, Hegde R, Saleh A, Datta P, Shiozaki E, Chai J, Lee RA., Robbins PD, Fernandes-Alnemri T, Shi Y., Alnemri ES. (2001). A conserved XIAP-interaction motif in caspase-9 and Smac/Diablo regulates caspase activity and apoptosis. Nature. 410: 112–16.
11. Srinivasula SM, Saleh A, Balkir L, Robbins PD, and Alnemri ES. (2000). Negative regulation of the Apaf-1 apoptosome by Hsp70. Nature Cell Biol 2: 476–483.

=== Book chapters ===
1. Fujita, K and Srinivasula SM. (2009). Ubiquitination and Death-receptor signaling. Death Receptors and Cognate Ligands in Cancer. Results Probl Cell Differ, SpringerLinks Publisher. 49: 87-114.
2. Srinivasula SM, Saleh A, Ahmad M, Fernandes-Alnemri T, Alnemri ES. (2001). Isolation and Assay of Caspases. Ch. 1. Methods in Cell Biol. 66:1-27.
