= IISER Aptitude Test =

Annual entrance test held in India

IISER Aptitude Test – UG
- Acronym: IAT
- Type: Electronic assessment (CBT mode)
- Administrator: IISER Joint Admission Committee (IISER-JAC Chairman)
- Skills tested: Physics Chemistry Biology and Mathematics.
- Purpose: Admission to: undergraduate science programs (4-year BS and 5-year BS-MS Dual Degree programs) in 7 IISERs; 4-year BS (Research) in IISc Bengaluru; 4-year BS in IIT Madras; 4-year BS in IIT Guwahati; 5-year BS-MS in IACS Kolkata; 5-year BS-MS in IIEST Shibpur.
- Year started: 2010 (16 years ago)
- Duration: 3 hours
- Score range: −60 to +240
- Offered: once in a year
- Restrictions on attempts: Maximum three attempts in consecutive years, with no age limit
- Regions: India
- Languages: English and Hindi only
- Annual number of test takers: Around 2 lakh (2026)
- Prerequisites: Candidates must have taken at least three subjects among Biology, Chemistry, Mathematics and Physics during their Class XII (or equivalent) examination.
- Fee: ₹2,000 for General/General-EWS/OBC/OBC-NCL (Central List) candidates; ₹1,000 for SC/ST/PwD/Third Gender/Kashmiri Migrants (KM) candidates; ₹12,000 for candidates under Foreign National category
- Qualification rate: ~1%
- Website: https://www.iiseradmission.in/

The IISER Aptitude Test (IAT) is a computer-based entrance examination in India for admission to undergraduate programs offered by the seven Indian Institutes of Science Education and Research (IISERs), along with Indian Institute of Science (IISc), IACS Kolkata, IIT Guwahati, IIEST Shibpur and Indian Institute of Technology Madras (IIT Madras). The exam has an acceptance rate of roughly 1-1.5%, making it one of the most competitive exams in the country, comparable to JEE (Advanced) in terms of selectivity. Roughly 2.3k seats are available in all IISERs. It serves as a gateway to India’s top research institutions, particularly the IISERs and IISc, which are known for their strong emphasis on fundamental science, rigorous academics, and a research-driven environment focused on building future scientists and innovators.

It is the only examination to get admission into the,

- 5-year BS-MS Dual Degree Programs of the IISERs
- 5-year BS-MS in Computational and Data Sciences of IISER Kolkata (from 2025)
- 4-year B.Tech Programs (Chemical Engineering, Data Science & Engineering, Electrical Engineering & Computer Science) of IISER Bhopal
- 4-year BS Degree Program in Economic Sciences of IISER Bhopal
- 4-year BS Degree Program in Economic and Statistical Sciences of IISER Tirupati
- Major in Geology introduced as part of the regular 5-year BS-MS in IISER Mohali (from 2026)
- Major in Environmental Sciences as part of the regular 5-year BS-MS in IISER Mohali (from 2026)
- 4-year BS Degree Programs in Chemistry, Medical Sciences and Engineering of IIT Madras
- 5 Year BS-MS program at IACS Kolkata (from 2026)
- 4-year BS Degree program in Biomedical Science and Engineering in IIT Guwahati
- 5-year BS-MS programs in Physics, Chemistry, Applied Geology of IIEST, Shibpur (from 2026) [20 seats from IAT and 20 seats from JoSAA counselling in each of these three departments]

It also serves as one of the channels to get admission into the 4-year BS (Research) Degree Program of IISc Bangalore. Counselling and admission to the IISERs are conducted by the IISER-JAC centralised counselling. The organising institute for IAT 2026 is IISER Berhampur. Admission to the institutes other than IISERs require separate registration to the respective programs beforehand the centralised counselling within a certain time frame notified by that institute. They publish separate merit lists based on the registrations for that specific program.

== IAT for IISERs ==
From 2024 onwards, admissions to IISERs are exclusively through the IISER Aptitude Test (IAT). There is no JEE Advanced channel or KVPY channel for admission in IISER anymore.

== Test Pattern ==
IAT is conducted as a computer based test in the centers across India.

IAT consists of 60 questions: 15 questions each from Biology, Chemistry, Mathematics, and Physics.

Total time for answering the test is 3 hours. Questions are of multiple choice type with only one correct answer.

- Each correct answer is awarded 4 marks.
- Each incorrect answer leads to the deduction of 1 mark.
- Unanswered questions are awarded 0 mark.
- Therefore, maximum marks awarded in IAT are 240.

The total marks obtained by a candidate out of 240 is considered for preparing the Rank List.

Not every candidate appearing in IAT is awarded a rank. Rank cut-off is announced at an appropriate time. Further, getting a rank does not guarantee offer/admission to an IISER.

== Syllabus ==
The syllabus broadly follows the NCERT syllabus for classes 11 and 12. For 2026 exam, it will follow the rationalized syllabus of 2025-26.

Syllabus for IAT
Biology	Chemistry	Mathematics	Physics
Diversity in the living world; Structural Organization in Animals and Plants; Cells: Structures and Functions; Plant and Animal physiology; Human physiology; Reproduction; Genetics and evolution; Biology and human welfare; Biotechnology and its application; Ecology and environment	Basic Principles of Chemistry; Structure of the Atom; Classification of Elements and Periodicity in Properties; Chemical Bonding and Molecular Structure; Thermodynamics; Equilibrium; Redox Reactions; Organic Chemistry – Some Basic Principles and Techniques; Hydrocarbons; Solutions; Electrochemistry; Chemical Kinetics; The d- & f-block elements; Coordination compounds; Haloalkanes and haloarenes; Alcohols, phenols and ethers; Aldehydes, ketones and carboxylic acids; Organic compounds containing nitrogens; Biomolecules	Sets; Relations and functions; Trigonometry Functions; Inverse Trigonometric Functions; Complex Numbers and Quadratic Equations; Linear Inequalities; Permutations and Combinations; Binomial Theorem; Sequences and Series; Straight Lines; Conic Sections; Three Dimensional Geometry; Limits and Derivatives; Statistics; Probability; Matrices; Determinants; Continuity and Differentiability; Application of Derivatives; Integrals; Applications of integrals; Differential equations; Vectors	Physical World and Measurement; Kinematics; Laws of Motion; Work, Energy and Power; Motion of Systems of Particles and Rigid body; Gravitation; Properties of bulk matter; Thermodynamics; Behavior of a perfect gas and Kinetic Theory; Oscillations; Waves; Electrostatics; Current Electricity; Magnetic effect of current and magnetism; Electromagnetic Induction; Alternating Current; Electromagnetic Waves; Optics; Dual Nature of Radiation and Matter; Atoms; Nuclei; Semiconductor and Electronic devices
