= Bhaurao =

Bhaurao is an Indian given name. Notable persons with this name include:

- Bhaurao Patil, social activist and educator in Maharashtra
- Bhaurao Datar, Indian film actor
- Bhaurao Gaikwad, Indian social activist and politician from Maharashtra
- Bhaurao Dagadurao Deshmukh, Indian politician from Maharashtra
- B. D. Khobragade, Indian politician and lawyer
- Bhavurao Deshpande, Indian politician from Karnataka
