= Stockholm International Youth Science Seminar =

Stockholm International Youth Science Seminar (SIYSS) is an annual week-long program that brings together selected pre-doctoral international scientists, arranged in connection with the Nobel Prize festivities. The seminar is organized by the SIYSS Committee of the Swedish Federation of Young Scientists.

The history of SIYSS dates back to 1976 when the first seminar was organized by the Swedish Federation of Young Scientists, with inspiration from Society for Science & the Public in USA. Turning out a great success, the SIYSS program has continued, combining the encounter with Swedish science and the Nobel Prize Awarding Ceremonies with an intense social program ever since then.

The program aims to promote international understanding and friendship, bringing together young people from all over the world with similar interests. Participants are selected through competitive national and international processes, including science competitions, nominations by organizations for young scientists, and merit-based university selections. Despite their diverse backgrounds, participants share a demonstrated excellence in the natural sciences and a strong commitment to international collaboration.

During the COVID-19 pandemic the program was - for the first time in its history - completely digital.

== SIYSS Committee ==
The seminar and the social program is organized by a committee of volunteers, which is recruited by the Swedish Federation of Young Scientists.

=== Previous committees ===
2019: Sara Svanberg, Emma Svedenblad, Karin Cederberg, Marina Peltonen, Tintin Torin, Lisa Weyhenmeyer, Emanuel Enberg, Avital Cherednik, Julia Reinius, Virág Angyal, Elizabeth Vaisbourd, Emma Pettersson

2020: Emma Svedenblad, Johanna Lidholm, Virág Angyal, Dina Lerjevik, Najma Omar, Tintin Torin, Emanuel Enberg

2026: Paulina Fulgencio, Linnea Jonröd, Theodor Sivager, Saga Bolund, Hanna Åkerman, Malin Müller, Olivia Trapsh, Tilde Josefsson, Maitreyi Muralidhar, Sami Jansson, Josefin Dejeborn Holmes, Khanh Huyen Tran, Emilia Brickman, Viggo Haglund, Leo Bolund

== Participating countries ==
Scientists from the following countries have participated in the SIYSS as of 2009:

- Australia
- China
- Denmark
- Hungary
- India
- Israel
- Japan
- Mexico
- Norway
- Poland
- Russia
- Singapore
- South Africa
- South Korea
- Switzerland
- United Kingdom
- United States

Also, every year winners of the EU Contest and the Intel ISEF and Expociencias Mexico participate in the event.

=== Previous participants ===
2019: Flórián Vámosi, Adrien Jathe, Juliana Davoglio Estradioto, Nikolai Tiedemann, Shunyu Yao, Timo Hoffman, Shicheng Hu, Youngjoon Han, Adam Kelly, Elena Su, Aaron Coe, Malin Mueller, June Park, Simon Scholtz, Dionne Argyropoulos, Johan Nordstrand, Yee Lin Tan, Aleksei Beliakov, Felix Christian Sewing, Alex Korocencev, Taiyo Ishikawa, Fumika Moria, Ariel Ben Dor, Sophya Vershinina, Patricio Moscoso Ramirez

2020: Christopher Ong Xianbo, Lihuang Ding, Mengyang Li, Chenxi Zeng, Luciana Marconi, Cynthia Chen, Hannah Nelson, Cédric Willemin, John Migliore, Annie Ostojic, Lillian Petersen, MinJae Kim, Martin Morales Trejo

2022: Benjamin Clegg, Konrad Basse Fisker, Jueun Sim, Emirhan Kurtulus, Romane Schönholzer, Rebecca Bächler, Héctor Martinez-Luna, Noelia Ares Boveda, Jordan Partington, Jonas Simonsen, Meda Surdokaité, Bertram Madsen, Saloni Kwatra, Joshua Shunk, Asmi Kumar, Charmain Williams, Hassan Aftab Sheikh, Sinan Deveci, Botond Mészáros, Jim Allansson, Ishaan Lohia, Stefanie Hövermann, Xiaoqing Sun

2023: Isabel Esaín-García, Kanghyeon Kim, Daniel Levin, Kevin Zhu, Raul Acosta Murillo, Bastian Auer, Dániel Viczián, Woojin Park, Leemen Chan, Brandon de Greef, Xiaoyan Dai, Maksymilian Gozdur, Jan Philipp Birmanns, Luca Seth Charlier, Jan Adrian Kamm, Mariana Reis, Alexander Plekhanov, Clément Vovard

== See also ==
- LIYSF
