= Bhaur =

Mountain range in Balochistan, Pakistan

Coordinates: 29°23′0″N 67°21′0″E

Bhaur is a mountain range located in the Kalat District of Balochistan, Pakistan. It is located at 29°22'60N 67°20'60 E.
