= Bhaura, Nawanshahr =

Bhaura
- Village
- Location in Punjab, India Bhaura (India)
- Coordinates: 31.205029°N 76.0592614°E
- Country: India
- State: Punjab
- District: Shaheed Bhagat Singh Nagar

Government
  - Type: Panchayat raj
  - Body: Gram panchayat
- Elevation: 254 m (833 ft)

Population (2011)
  - Total: 1,778
- Sex ratio 894/884 ♂/♀

Languages
  - Official: Punjabi
- Time zone: UTC+5:30 (IST)
- PIN: 144506
- Telephone code: 01823
- ISO 3166 code: IN-PB
- Post office: Mahil Gailan
- Website: nawanshahr.nic.in

Bhaura is a village in Shaheed Bhagat Singh Nagar district of Punjab State, India. The village is administrated by a sarpanch, or an elected representative of the village. Mr. Ranjit Kumar is the current head of the village.

== Demography ==
As of 2011, Bhaura has a total number of 385 houses and a population of 1778, including 894 males and 884 females according to the 2011 Indian census. The literacy rate of Bhaura is 82.11%, higher than the state average of 75.84%. The population of children under the age of 6 years is 157 which is 8.83% of the total population of Bhaura, and the child sex ratio is approximately 915 as compared to Punjab state average of 846.

Most of the people are from Schedule Caste which constitutes 41.96% of total population in Bhaura. The town does not have any Schedule Tribe population so far.

As per the report published by Census India in 2011, 594 people, including 502 males and 92 females, were engaged in work activities out of the total population of Bhaura which includes. According to the same census, 89.73% workers describe their work as main work and 10.27% workers are involved in marginal activity providing livelihood for less than 6 months.

== Education ==
The village has a Punjabi medium, co-ed upper primary school. The school provides mid-day meals as per the Indian Midday Meal Scheme. The school provides free education to children between the ages of 6 and 14 as per Right of Children to Free and Compulsory Education Act.

Amardeep Singh Shergill Memorial college Mukandpur and Sikh National College Banga are the nearest colleges. Lovely Professional University is 39 kilometres (24 mi) away from the village.

== Transport ==
Banga railway station is the nearest train station however, Garhshankar Junction railway station is 12 kilometres (7.5 mi) away from the village. Sahnewal Airport is the nearest domestic airport which located 67 kilometres (42 mi) away in Ludhiana and the nearest international airport is located in Chandigarh also Sri Guru Ram Dass Jee International Airport is the second nearest airport which is 147 kilometres (91 mi) away in Amritsar.

== See also ==
- List of villages in India
