= Indian Institutes of Science Education and Research =

Group of science education and research institutes in India

Indian Institute of Science Education and Research
- IISERs
- Other name: IISER or IISERs (plural) or IISER System
- Type: Public Research Institutes
- Established: 2006; 20 years ago
- Founders: Manmohan Singh & Arjun Singh
- Parent institution: Council of NITSER
- Accreditation: Ministry of Education
- Budget: ₹1,319 crore (US$140 million) (FY2025–26 est.)
- Location: 7 cities in India: Mohali; Pune; Bhopal; Kolkata; Thiruvananthapuram; Tirupati; Berhampur
- Campus: Multiple sites
- Language: English
- Website: https://www.iisersystem.ac.in/

Indian Institutes of Science Education and Research or IISERs (pronunciation: "EYE-sir") are a group of autonomous institutions established by the Government of India through the Ministry of Education for teaching and research in natural science and to provide collegiate education in basic sciences integrated with research at the undergraduate level.

The institutes were formally established by the Parliament of India through the Science Education and Research (Amendment) Act, 2010. Seven IISERs have been established across the country, namely IISER Pune in Maharashtra, IISER Bhopal in Madhya Pradesh, IISER Mohali in Punjab, IISER Kolkata in West Bengal, IISER Thiruvananthapuram in Kerala, IISER Tirupati in Andhra Pradesh, and IISER Berhampur in Odisha. All IISERs were declared as Institutes of National Importance by the Parliament of India in 2012, to promote them as leading institutions in the country in the field of basic sciences along with institutes like Indian Institute of Science, Bangalore. The financial outlay for each IISER is around ₹500 crore (US$53 million) for the first five years of establishment.

== Academics and admission ==
Until 2023, JEE Advanced results could be used as a procedure for getting into IISERs, and until 2022, the defunct KVPY exam was another criterion for admission.

However, starting 2024, admission to the undergraduate programs at IISERs will exclusively through the IISER Aptitude Test.

IISER Aptitude Test (IAT) is also used for admitting student to the following institutes like Bachelor of Science (Research) program of Indian Institute of Science (IISc), Bangalore, BS-Medical Sciences and Engineering program and BS-Chemistry program of Indian Institute of Technology Madras (IITM), BS-Biomedical Sciences and Engineering program of Indian Institute of Technology Guwahati (IITG), Integrated BS-MS program of Indian Association for the Cultivation of Science (IACS) and BS-MS in Chemistry, Physics and Applied Geology program of Indian Institute of Engineering Science and Technology Shibpur (IIEST).

== Programs of the IISERs ==
All the 7 IISERS provide 5-year BS-MS programs in Biological, Chemical, Mathematical, Geological, Physical and Earth, Climate, Environmental Sciences, as well as Computer Programming and Humanities programs, MSc, MS (Research), Integrated PhD, Doctor of Philosophy (PhD) and Post Doctoral Research Programs.

Note: 4-year B.Tech degree in Engineering Sciences (Chemical Engineering, Data Science & Engineering, Electrical Engineering & Computer Science) and Economic Sciences are provided at IISER Bhopal only

For 5-year BS-MS programs, In the first year, all students are introduced to basic sciences, i.e., Biological, Chemical, Mathematical, Physical and Earth Sciences, as well as Computer Programming and Humanities courses. In the second year, the students select three pre-major subjects from the first five disciplines mentioned above. In the third and fourth years, students study a major subject from the three pre-major subjects chosen in the second level and need to take interdisciplinary courses as electives. The fifth year is almost completely devoted to full time research/ technical projects/ specialized training in which the students need to prepare a dissertation. At the end of the fifth year, both Bachelors and Masters Degrees are awarded to successful students.

== Institutes ==
The IISERs are located in the following locations in India:

#	Name	Short Name	Established	City/Town	State/UT	Website	Overall NIRF Rank (2024)	Research NIRF Rank (2024)	Overall NIRF Rank (2025)	Research NIRF Rank (2025)
1	IISER Pune	IISER-P	2006	Pune	Maharashtra	www.iiserpune.ac.in	42	29	55	35
2	IISER Kolkata	IISER-K	2006	Kalyani	West Bengal	www.iiserkol.ac.in	61	38	67	46
3	IISER Mohali	IISER-M	2007	Mohali	Punjab	www.iisermohali.ac.in	64	49	70	
4	IISER Bhopal	IISER-B	2008	Bhopal	Madhya Pradesh	www.iiserb.ac.in	78		75	
5	IISER Thiruvananthapuram	IISER-TVM	2008	Thiruvananthapuram	Kerala	www.iisertvm.ac.in				
6	IISER Tirupati	IISER-T	2015	Tirupati	Andhra Pradesh	www.iisertirupati.ac.in				
7	IISER Berhampur	IISER-BPR	2016	Berhampur	Odisha	www.iiserbpr.ac.in				

Location of 7 IISERs

=== Future institutes ===
- IISER Nagaland, a new IISER in Nagaland was announced in the 2015-16 budget. Initially the Nagaland government suggested a different institute (SPA – School of Planning and Architecture) instead of an IISER. After many years, in 2021 and 2022, the Nagaland state government has shown renewed interest on establishing this earlier announced IISER in Nagaland. Whether the decision was unilateral or ‘advised’ is unknown, but the end result is clear – neither the IISER nor the SPA was established in Nagaland. However, a letter written by the then Chief Minister, TR Zeliang to Smriti Zubin Irani, the then Union Minister for the erstwhile Union Human Resource Development dated 16 December 2015, informed of the choice. In 2024 Government of Nagaland acquired 200 acres of land to establish IISER Campus.
- IISER Gandhinagar, The Government of India granted approval for an IISER to be established at Gandhinagar, Gujarat on 27 September 2024. The Government of Gujarat has proposed allocating land next to the National Institute of Design, National Institute of Fashion Technology and Infocity.

== Locations ==
Indian Institute of Science Education and Research, Mohali started functioning from the Mahatma Gandhi State Institute of Public Administration complex in Sector 26, Chandigarh. The foundation stone for its permanent campus was laid in September 2006 by the Prime Minister of India, Manmohan Singh at Sector 81, Mohali.

Indian Institute of Science Education and Research, Pune started functioning from the National Chemical Laboratory, Pune campus. Labs, Lecture Hall complexes, main buildings, and hostels have been set up in a permanent campus.

Indian Institute of Science Education and Research, Bhopal started functioning from the ITI Gas Rahat Building, Govindpura, Bhopal. The institute was moved to a main campus in Bhauri in August 2012.

Indian Institute of Science Education and Research, Kolkata was functioning from the temporary campus at Mohanpur, a temporary arrangement within the campus of Bidhan Chandra Krishi Viswavidyalaya (BCKV) previously and now almost all the labs have been shifted to its permanent campus, over 250 acres (1.0 km^{2}) of land at Haringhata, Kalyani near Kolkata.

Indian Institute of Science Education and Research, Thiruvananthapuram is situated at Vithura, which is 40 km from Thiruvananthapuram city. Earlier, it was functioning from a temporary campus at the College of Engineering, Trivandrum.

Indian Institute of Science Education and Research, Tirupati is functioning fully on the permanent campus, which was constructed at Yerpedu in 2024, about a half-hour away from the city in a plot of about 250 acres (1 km^{2}) near the foothills of the Saptagiri range.

Indian Institute of Science Education and Research, Berhampur commenced in Odisha in 2016. It is functioning from a transit campus at Government ITI. Its permanent campus is being built at Laudigam, near the sea, 20 km from Berhampur, Odisha.
