= Indian Institute of Science Education and Research, Thiruvananthapuram =

Institution of higher education in Kerala, India

Coordinates: 8°40′56″N 77°08′12″E

Indian Institute of Science Education and Research Thiruvananthapuram
- Type: Public university
- Established: 2008; 18 years ago
- Officer in charge: Robinson George (Registrar)
- Dean: Joy Mitra; Rajeev N Kini; Hema Somanathan; K. George Thomas; R. S. Swathi
- Director: S. Murty Srinivasula (2026–); Eluvathingal Devassy Jemmis (Founding Director)
- Academic staff: 100
- Students: 1,080
- Undergraduates: 828
- Doctoral students: 252
- Location: Vithura, Thiruvananthapuram, Kerala, 695551, India
- Campus: 200 acres
- Language: English
- Website: iisertvm.ac.in

Indian Institute of Science Education and Research, Vithura, Thiruvananthapuram (IISER Thiruvananthapuram or IISER-TVM) is an autonomous public university established by the Ministry of Human Resource Development, Government of India, to bridge the gap between research and basic sciences' education at the undergraduate level.The campus is located in Vithura, Kerala, India, 40 kms from Thiruvananthapuram. The institute is one of the seven IISERs All IISERs are declared as Institutes of National Importance by the Parliament of India in 2012 through the NIT Amendment Act.

IISER Thiruvananthapuram awards Bachelor of Science and Master of Science (BS-MS) dual-degrees, and Doctor of Philosophy (Ph.D.) degrees in mathematics, physics, chemistry, and biology. IISER TVM is to offer five new BS-MS programmes (i^{2} Sciences) and new two-year M.Sc programmes in 2021.

== History ==
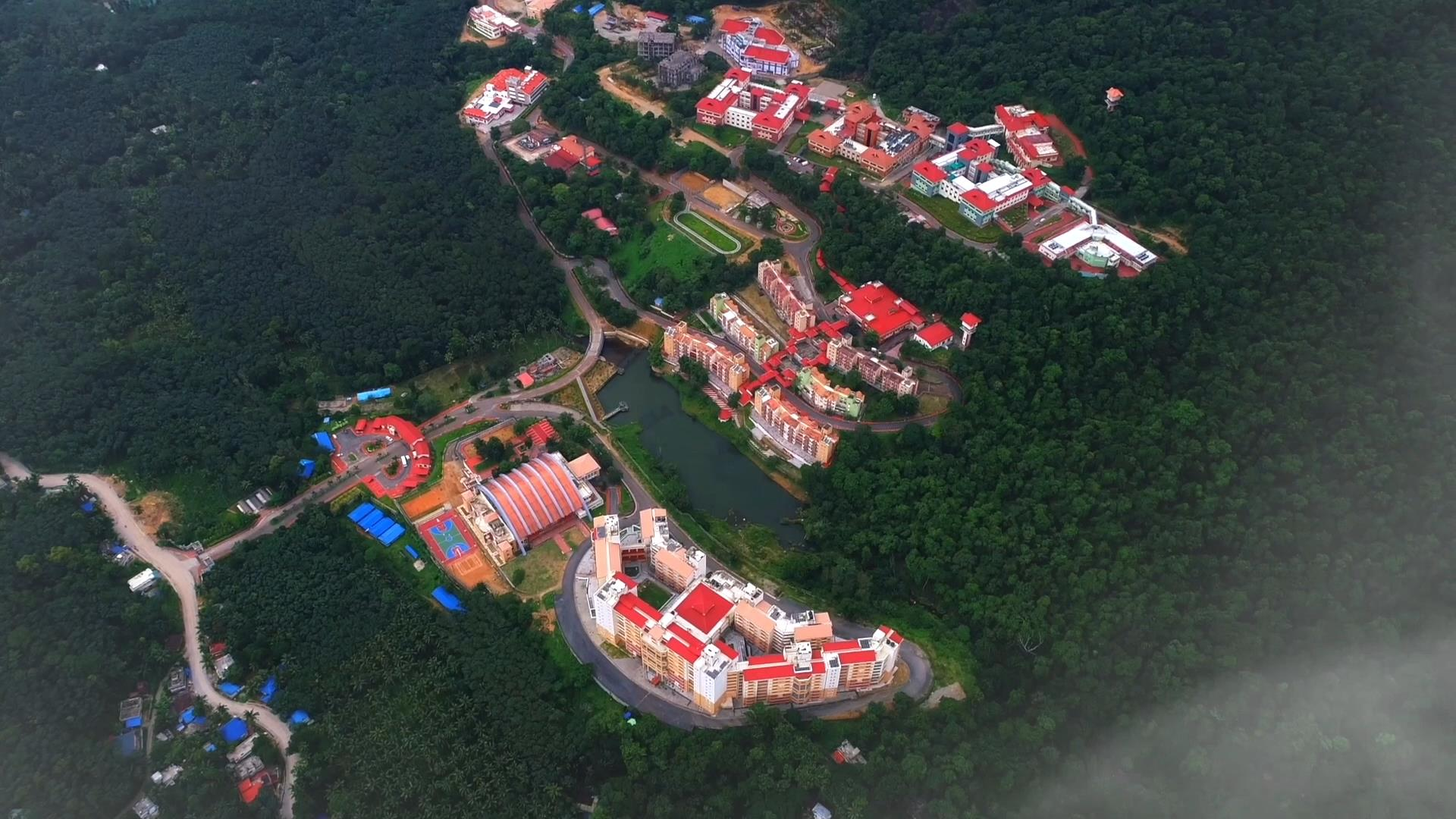
IISER TVM aerial view of the campus

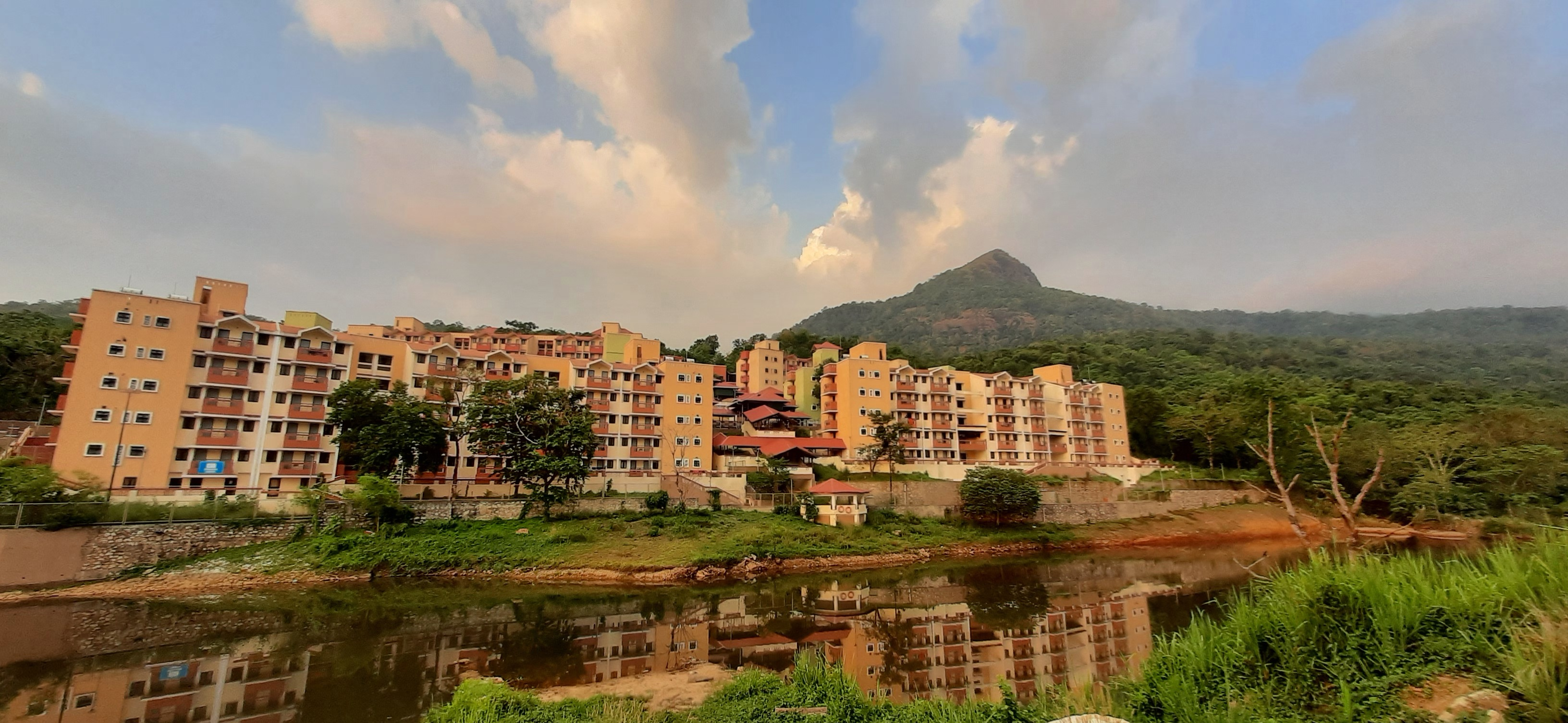
Hostel block

Indian Institutes of Science Education and Research (IISERs) were established in 2006 through a proclamation of the Ministry of Education, Government of India to promote quality collegiate education and research in basic sciences. Each IISER is a degree-granting autonomous institution with a prime focus to integrate science education and research. IISERs receive generous funding from the Government of India.

Soon after MHRD's announcement in 2006, two of these institutes were established at Pune and Kolkata in 2006. This was followed by another institute at Mohali in 2007, and two more at Bhopal and Thiruvananthapuram in 2008. More recently, two more IISERs were established at Tirupati and Berhampur in 2015 and 2016 respectively.

== Campus ==
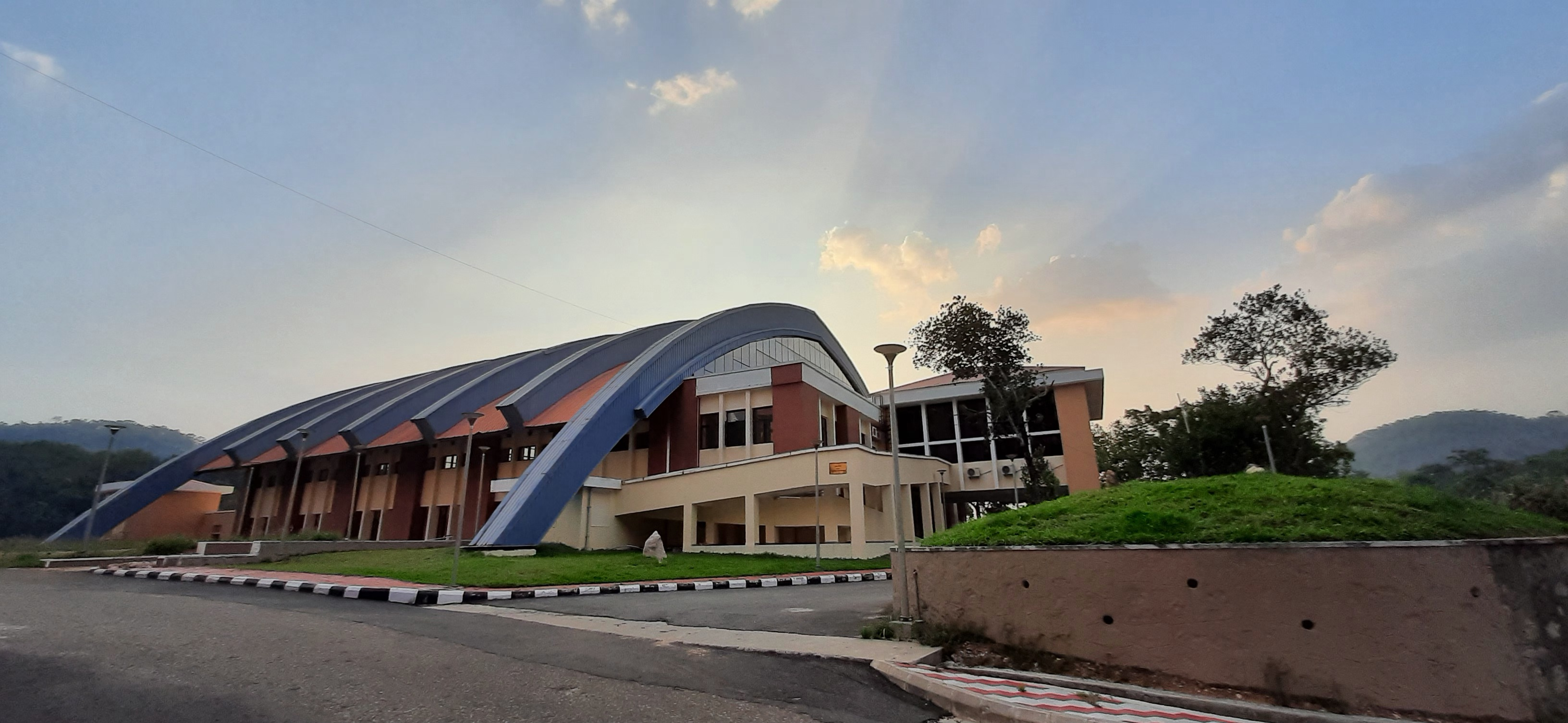
Indoor Stadium

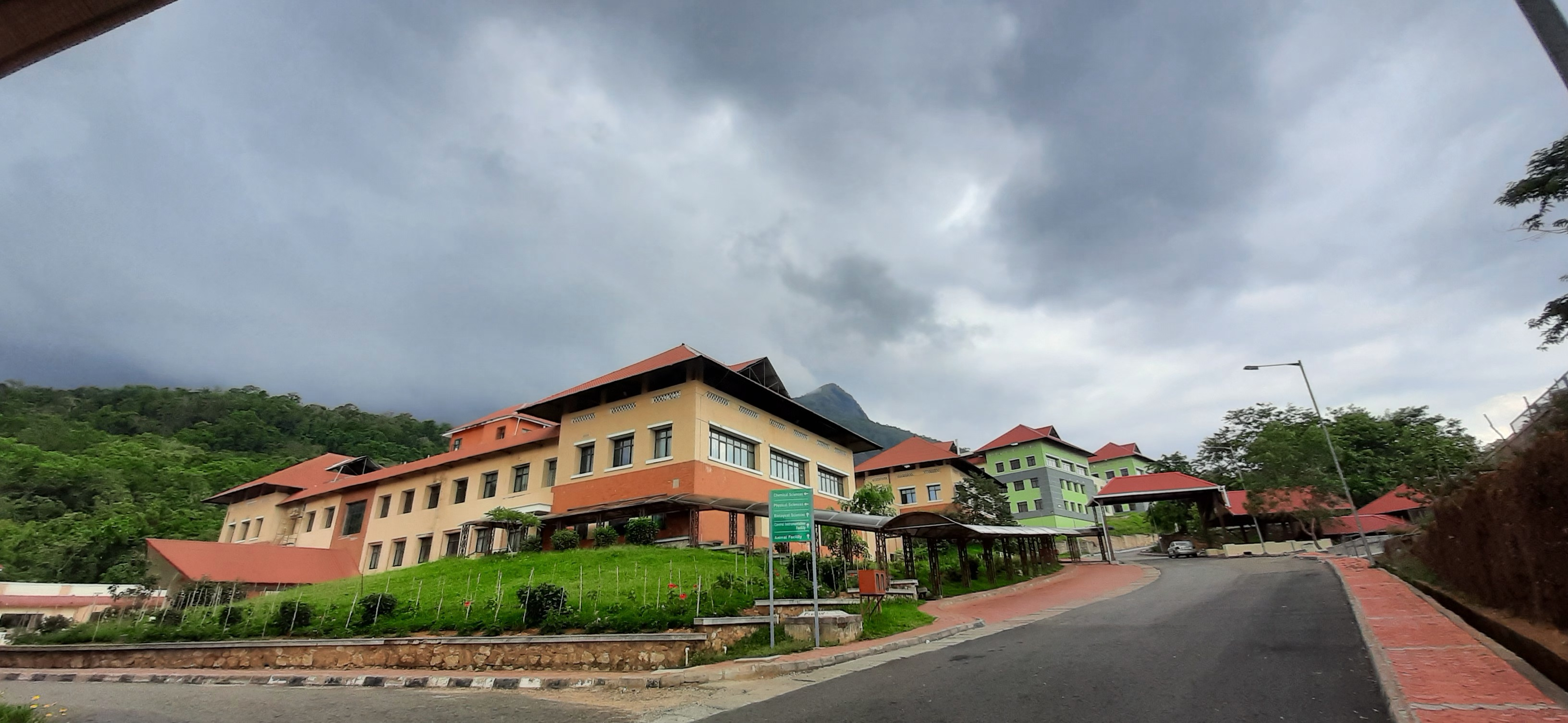
Chemical Science and Biology Building

IISER TVM campus is located in the foothills of the Western Ghats and spans about 200 acres in Vithura, approximately 40 km from Thiruvananthapuram, Kerala. The campus hosts academic buildings, research facilities, student hostels, and residential areas for faculty and staff.

The institute has extensive sports infrastructure including a multi-sport indoor stadium, a tennis court, two basketball courts, two volleyball courts, four badminton courts, cricket practice nets, and a football ground. Many outdoor facilities, including the football and basketball courts, are equipped with floodlights. Dedicated areas are provided for kabaddi and kho-kho as well.

Indoor recreational and sports amenities include table tennis, chess, carrom, and a fully equipped gymnasium. The campus features two dining halls (Central Dining Halls, CDH ( 1 and 2) that cater to students, research scholars, and faculty. Additional amenities include a central library, health centre, bank and ATM facilities, cafeterias, student activity spaces, and regular shuttle transport within the campus. The natural surroundings of the Western Ghats provide opportunities for nature walks and outdoor student activities.

== Organization and administration ==
=== Governance ===
The institute is administered by a board of governors with Dr. Vijayalaxmi Deshmane as chairperson, as Prof. Mahesh Hariharan deputy director, a 13-member Senate, and the director, Prof. S. Murty Srinivasula . The deans are M. P. Rajan (Academics), Ramesh Chandra Nath (Students Affairs), Hema Somanathan (Research and Development) and Anil Shaji (Planning and Development).

=== Departments ===
Division	Departments, Centers, and Units
School of Biology	Cytoskeleton and Cell cycle Laboratory; Drosophila Circadian Clock Laboratory; Animal Behavior and Ecology Laboratory; Genome Stability Laboratory; Immunology Laboratory; Microbiology Laboratory; Molecular Virology Laboratory; Plant Molecular Genetics Laboratory; Prokaryotic Development Laboratory; Stem Cell Laboratory; Structural Molecular Biology (SMB) Laboratory; 'Vanasiri' (Evolutionary Ecology Laboratory)
School of Chemistry	Inorganic chemistry; Organic chemistry; Physical chemistry; Theoretical chemistry
School of Mathematics	Positive Operator Theory; Partial differential equation; Stochastic process; Numerical Functional Analysis; Financial Mathematics; Control theory; Differential games; Combinatorial Number Theory; Group theory; Linear algebra, Commutative algebra and Homological algebra; Ramsey theory
School of Physics	Condensed matter physics; High-energy Physics; Optics; Statistical mechanics; Gravitational wave astronomy; Nanoscale materials; Quantum information theory; Solar cells

== Academics ==
=== Academic programs ===
- Dual-degree Bachelor of Science & Master of Science (BS-MS): The 5-year dual degree BS-MS program is the flagship program of all IISERs. The first two years of this program involves coursework in all subjects (Physics, Chemistry, Mathematics, Biology, Humanities and Interdisciplinary courses). For the next two years, the students choose courses in a 'Major' and a 'Minor' subject as per their research interests. The final year is solely spent on a research project in their Major subject. Admissions to the BS-MS program is highly competitive, with only the following students eligible to apply:
1. Kishore Vaigyanik Protsahan Yojana (KVPY) Basic Science Stream: Students who possess KVPY scholarships (in SA / SX / SB streams) in the current admission year
2. Joint Entrance Examination (Advanced): Students who secure a place in the common rank list of Joint Entrance Examination (Advanced) for admission to Indian Institutes of Technology (IITs)
3. State and Central Boards (IISER Aptitude Test): Students who secure a specified cut-off percentage (published each year) in their Higher Secondary (Class 12) Board Exams may be considered for admission after clearing IISER Aptitude Test. This is currently done in co-ordination with the other IISERs through a Joint Admission Program.
- Doctoral of Philosophy (Ph.D.): Admission to the doctoral program is after a master's degree in science. Besides the students of the dual-degree BS-MS program, postgraduate students with a master's degree in science from other universitiesor institutes can also be admitted to the doctoral program. The program will involve mandatory course work, a qualifying examination, thesis research under the guidance of a faculty member, an open seminar and a dissertation defense examination, leading to the award of a Ph.D. degree. The quantum of course work will vary depending on the background of the student. Besides individual research, students will be involved in several professional activities such as seminars, workshops, presentations and review meetings. All doctoral students will assist faculty members in teaching during the course of the doctoral program.
- Integrated Doctor of Philosophy (Int. Ph.D.): Admission to this program is after a B.Sc. degree in any of the basic sciences subjects. Students of this program start by attending classes with third year students of dual degree BS-MS program. After completing the specified graduate coursework and clearing a comprehensive exam, the students begin their Ph.D. research under the guidance of faculty members. The duration of this program ranges from 6 to 7 years, depending on the required coursework and nature of research.

=== Rankings ===
University and College rankings

General – India
- NIRF (Overall) (2024): 151-200

Indian Institute of Science Education and Research, Thiruvananthapuram was ranked in the 151-200 band in India by the National Institutional Ranking Framework in overall ranking in 2024.

Nature Index ranked IISERs as a whole at 4th in the World's 'Top 30 academic institutions under 30' in high-quality research output. It also ranked IISERs at 37th in its overall list of World's Top 200 rising academic institutions.

=== Nature Index ===
According to the Nature Index institutional profile, IISER Thiruvananthapuram is among India’s leading research institutes in the natural sciences.

Subject-wise rank in India (Nature Index 2024–2025):

Subject area	Rank in India
Biological sciences	10
Chemistry	12
Earth & environmental sciences	38
Health sciences	91
Physical sciences	19

Research output (1 September 2024 – 31 August 2025):

Subject area	Count	Share
Biological sciences	6	3.06
Chemistry	46	35.58
Earth & environmental sciences	3	0.17
Health sciences	1	0.08
Physical sciences	18	9.34

Five-year Nature Index Share:

- 2020 — 17
- 2021 — 19
- 2022 — 31
- 2023 — 28
- 2024 — 31

== Student life ==
=== Hostels ===
- IISER Thiruvananthapuram provides separate residential facilities for male students in Anamudi A Block, Anamudi D Block, Agasthya, Eravimala, Mukurti, and Ponmudi (B Wing).
- Female students are accommodated in Anamudi B Block, Anamudi C Block, Anamudi E Block, Ponmudi (A Wing), Pushpagiri, and Sispara.

=== Ishya ===
Ishya is the annual cultural festival of IISER Thiruvananthapuram, established in 2010. The festival is typically held in March, coinciding with the advent of spring. Organized entirely by the student community, it features a wide range of events fostering artistic and cultural expression.

- The literary and oratory events include JAM (Just A Minute), Mushaira (poetry symposium), Bon Mot, and creative writing competitions in English, Hindi, and Malayalam, alongside the "Put Funda" open quiz.
- Performing arts competitions feature Drama, Monodrama, Mime, Dance Battle, Recreation Dance, the "Rawaaz" fashion show, and the "Mudra" inter-collegiate dance contest.
- Musical events include "Aawaz" (solo vocals), "Unplugged", and "Tarang", while Fine Arts categories cover Painting, Pencil Drawing, Live Sketching, Calligraphy, and Mehendi.
- The festival's "Pro-Shows" have featured performances by notable artists and bands including Masala Coffee, Agam, Gowry lekshmi, Anand Bhaskar Collective, When Chai Met Toast, and DJ Shaan, etc.

=== Notable achievements ===
- The Gravitational Wave Group at the School of Physics (part of the Indian Initiative in Gravitational-wave Observations (IndIGO) comprising scientists from nine institutions working under the LIGO) Scientific Collaboration (LSC), IISER TVM also contributed to historic discovery of gravitational waves.
- IISER TVM students builds an affordable radio telescope.

=== Conferences and workshops ===
- Indian Strings Meeting (ISM), 2018
- Chromosome Stability 2016
- All India Cell Biology Conference
- Cryo Electron Microscopy and 3D Image Processing of Macromolecular Assemblies and Cellular Tomography (CEM3DIP)
- Workshop on High Performance Scientific Computing
- International Symposium on Clusters, Cluster-Assemblies and Nanomaterials (ISCAN)
- Indo-UK Workshop on Stochastic Partial Differential Equations and Applications
- 8th Asian Photochemistry Conference 2014
- GW@ASI2014: Satellite workshop on Gravitational Wave Astronomy at the ASI Meeting

== See also ==
- List of autonomous higher education institutes in India
- List of universities in India
- IRINS profile
- IISER Admission
- ISER Comprehensive overview
