= Bhaurao Datar =

Indian silent film actor (1903–1982)

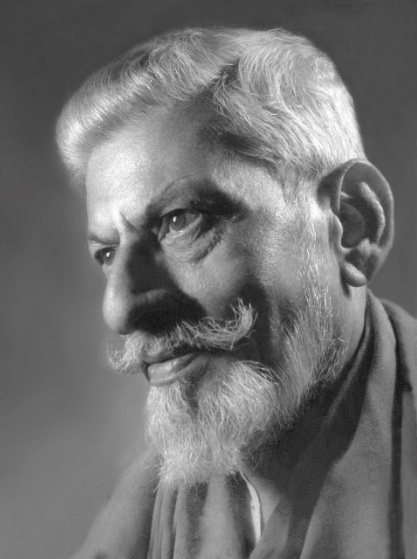
- Born: 14 January 1903; Satara, Bombay Presidency, India
- Died: 15 September 1982 (aged 79); Mumbai, Maharashtra. India
- Occupations: actor, make-up artist, wrestler
- Years active: 1922–1963

Bhaurao Datar (14 January 1903 − 15 September 1982) was an Indian silent film actor, popularly known for his role as the 17th century Maratha king Shivaji.

== Early life ==
Krishnaji Vishwanath Datar alias Bhaurao Datar was born on 14 January 1903 in a rich family which soon experienced a sudden financial downfall and was forced to move to Nasik, Maharashtra for better life. There his father started a tea stall near Vijayanand theatre. While helping his father to serve tea, young Datar observed renowned actors like Master Dinanath and Bal Gandharva and was attracted towards acting and learned the first lesson of acting.

With growing age, he joined a local gymnasium and soon became a wrestler and won many medals in Nasik Akhada. His well built physique and attractive personality gave him first chance to work in Dadasaheb Phalke's studio. His personal life and noted contribution in about 80 films as a lead actor have been recorded in Datar family history book named Datar Kulvrutant (1974)

== Personal life ==
Bhaurao Datar married twice. His first wife was Kashi Bilwalkar and he had three daughters from his first marriage. After death of his first wife, he married Anusuya Vaidya and had one son and two daughters from his second wife.

== Film career ==
Hero of Dadasaheb Phalke's silent movies.

Datar started his career in the era of silent films. He was associated with Phalke studio and acted in over 80 non talkie Marathi films, 20 talkie Marathi films and one Hindi film.

=== 1922-1928 ===
Out of Dadasaheb's 119 movies, 80 were made between 1918 and 1928. It is worth mentioning that out of 80 movies, 60 had Bhaurao Datar in different roles. He also acted in silent and talkie films with other renowned directors like Nanasaheb Sarpotdar, Master Vinayak and Bhalji Pendharkar. He acted in silent films but his performances were so lively that one used to be simply mesmerized.

=== 1928-1933 ===
After leaving Dadasaheb's company in Nasik, he set off to Nanasaheb Sarpotdar's company in Pune known as Aryan Company. He performed in 15 out of 20 films made. His role as ‘Thaksen’ in Prince Thaksen, Samsher in Samsher Bahaddar (Brave Samsher), Dr. Madan in Good Bye Marriage, Ramdas in Bhavani Talwar etc. were highly appreciated. With Lalita Pawar, he had many silent films like Dashrathi Ram, Subhadra haran, Chatur Sundari, Thakay Maushi, Samsher Bahadur and Prithviraj Sanyogita. They also worked together in ‘Duniya Kya hai’ and ‘Netaji Palkar’ later.

=== 1933-1936 ===
In 1933, he left Pune to enter into dazzling world of Mumbai's film industry. Ardeshir Irani's film company welcomed him. Here he played various roles in talkie films like Rukmini haran, Chalta Putla, Prithviraj Sanyukta and Devki. His role as a mentally challenged prince in ‘Chalta Putla’ was highly appreciated and famous.

=== 1937-1944 ===
He acted in Dharmaveer, Chimukla Sansar, Mazhe Bal of Master Vinayak, Netaji Palkar of Sir Bhalji Pendharkar

=== Immortal Shivaji of film industry ===
Dadasaheb Phalke first brought Shri Datar to the screen in his silent movie ‘Agryahoon Sutka’ (1929) in the role of Shivaji. Later in the era of talkies too, he made name in that role. He was known for his Shivaji role and even statue of Shivaji of Raigad made by Shri Patkar and Shri Sahastrabuddhe Guruji was made by taking all the measurements and look of Shri Bhaurao Datar byasking him to sit in front of them for hours together. The statue of Shivaji is in itself a great memory of Bhaurao Datar's role as Shivaji in the film industry.

=== Makeup ===
Bhaurao's career as an actor did not last in the modern era of Indian cinema. But soon he was known as Dada Datar, the make up magician. A versatile actor and also a makeup artist, this was a unique combination Dada Datar had in him. After getting over with the career of an actor, Bhaurao took up a job with Mukherjee's filmalaya. Now he was called as Dada Datar and he rendered his service as a makeup master in many Hindi films. He was the most popular makeup artist and was creator of widely famous ‘Sadhana Cut’.

=== Documentary film ===
A documentary film on Bhaurao Datar by his grand son Mr. Bharat Kanhere, exfaculty of Cinematography FTII, Pune will be shortly released. This film is specially made to honour Bhaurao Datar and many other, lesser known contributors to the film industry. The film is about the contributions of multitalented artist ‘Bhaurao Datar’ to Indian film industry.

=== List of silent Marathi movies ===
| Year | Film | Director | Producer/Film company |
|---|---|---|---|
| 1922 | Ahiravan Mahiravan | Mr G.V.Sane | Hindustan Film Co.Nasik |
| 1922 | Ganesh Avatar | Mr G.V.Sane | Hindustan Film Co.Nasik |
| 1922 | Haritalika | Mr G.V.Sane | Hindustan Film Co.Nasik |
| 1922 | Pandav Vanavas | Mr G.V.Sane | Hindustan Film Co.Nasik |
| 1922 | Shishupal Vadh | Mr G.V.Sane | Hindustan Film Co.Nasik |
| 1923 | Ashwathama | Dadasaheb Phalke | Hindustan Film Co.Nasik |
| 1923 | Babruwahan | Dadasaheb Phalke | Hindustan Film Co.Nasik |
| 1923 | Buddha Dev | Dadasaheb Phalke | Hindustan Film Co.Nasik |
| 1923 | Gora Kumbhar | Mr G.V.Sane | Hindustan Film Co.Nasik |
| 1923 | Guru Dronoacharya | Dadasaheb Phalke | Hindustan Film Co.Nasik |
| 1923 | Jarasandha Vadha | Dadasaheb Phalke | Hindustan Film Co.Nasik |
| 1923 | Kalicha Narad | Mr Shinde | Hindustan Film Co.Nasik |
| 1923 | Kanya Vikraya | V.S. Nirntar | Hindustan Film Co.Nasik |
| 1923 | Mahananda | Dadasaheb Phalke | Hindustan Film Co.Nasik |
| 1923 | Champraj Hado | Nanubhai B. Desai | |
| 1923 | Durgesh Nandini | Bhalji Pendharkar | Hindustan Film Co Nasik |
| 1924 | Datta Janma | Mr. G.V. Sane | Hindustan Film Co.Nasik |
| 1924 | Jayadratha Vadh | Mr. G.V. Sane | Hindustan Film Co.Nasik |
| 1924 | Shivajichi Agryhun Sutaka | Dadasaheb Phalke | Hindustan Film Co.Nasik |
| 1924 | Sundopasund | Mr. G.V. Sane | Hindustan Film Co.Nasik |
| 1924 | Municipal Election | Dadasaheb Phalke | Hindustan Film Co.Nasik |
| 1925 | Anant Vrat | G.V Sane | Hindustan Film Co.Nasik |
| 1925 | Chatruthicha Chandra | Dadasaeb Phalke | Hindustan Film Co.Nasik |
| 1925 | Hidimba Bakasur Vadh | Dadasaheb Phalke | Hindustan Film Co.Nasik |
| 1925 | Sant Janabai | Dadasaheb Phalke | Hindustan Film Co.Nasik |
| 1925 | Satyabhama Vivah | Dadasaheb Phalke | Hindustan Film Co.Nasik |
| 1925 | Shatmukh Ravan Vadh | Dadasaheb Phalke | Hindustan Film Co.Nasik |
| 1925 | Simantak Mani | Dadasaheb Phalke | Hindustan Film Co.Nasik |
| 1926 | Sati Tara | Dadasaheb Phalke | Hindustan Film Co.Nasik |
| 1926 | Balaji Nimbalkar | Dadasaheb Phalke | Hindustan Film Co.Nasik |
| 1926 | Bhakta Pralhad | Dadasaheb Phalke | Hindustan Film Co.Nasik |
| 1926 | Bhim Sanjieevan | GV Sane | Hindustan Film Co.Nasik |
| 1926 | Keechaka Vadh | GV Sane | Hindustan Film Co.Nasik |
| 1926 | Sant Eknath | Dadasaheb Phalke | Hindustan Film Co.Nasik |
| 1926 | Ramrajya Vijay | Dadasaheb Phalke | Hindustan Film Co.Nasik |
| 1927 | Bhakta Sudama | Dadasaheb Phalke | Hindustan Film Co.Nasik |
| 1927 | Draupadi Vastraharan | Dadasaheb Phalke | Hindustan Film Co.Nasik |
| 1927 | Hanuman Janma | Dadasaheb Phalke | Hindustan Film Co.Nasik |
| 1927 | Madalasa | GV Sane | Hindustan Film Co.Nasik |
| 1927 | Rukmini Haran | Mr. Shinde | Hindustan Film Co.Nasik |
| 1927 | Dashavatar | GV Sane | Hindustan Film Co.Nasik |
| 1927 | Ramrajya Vijay | Dadasaheb Phalke | Hindustan Film Co.Nasik |
| 1928 | Parshuram | Dadasaheb Phalke | Hindustan Film Co.Nasik |
| 1928 | Bhakta Damaji | Dadasaheb Phalke | Hindustan Film Co.Nasik |
| 1928 | Ghoshayatra | GV Sane | Hindustan Film Co.Nasik |
| 1928 | Narad Sansar | Mr. Shinde | Hindustan Film Co.Nasik |
| 1928 | Sati Pingala | GV Sane | Hindustan Film Co.Nasik |
| 1928 | Malhari Martand | Mamasahab Shinde | Hindustan Film Co.Nasik |
| 1928 | Krishna Shishtai | Dadasaheb Phalke | Hindustan Film Co.Nasik |
| 1929 | Shri Balaji | GV Sane | Aryan film co, Pune |
| 1929 | Thaksen Rajputra | ND Sarpotdar | Aryan film co, Pune |
| 1929 | Subhadra Haran | ND Sarpotdar | Aryan film co, Pune |
| 1929 | Prempash | Mr Dinkar Bidkar | Aryan film co, Pune |
| 1929 | Parijatak | GV Sane | Aryan film co, Pune |
| 1929 | Prithviraj Sanyogita | ND Sarpotdar | Aryan film co, Pune |
| 1929 | Dashrathi Ram | GV Sane | Aryan film co, Pune |
| 1929 | Raja Harishchandra | ND Sarpotdar | Aryan film co, Pune |
| 1929 | Vasant Sena | | |
| 1930 | Subramaniyam | ND Sarpotdar | Aryan film co, Pune |
| 1930 | Soneri Khanjar | Harshadrai Mehta | Suresh film co, Pune |
| 1930 | Chatur Sundri | ND Sarpotdar | Aryan film co, Pune |
| 1930 | Bhimsen | ND Sarpotdar | Aryan film co, Pune |
| 1930 | Samsher Bahadur | ND Sarpotdar | Aryan film co, Pune |
| 1930 | Champion of the Sword | ND Sarpotdar | Aryan film co, Pune |
| 1930 | Komalner Nikusum | Dhirubhai Desai | SUresh film co, Pune |
| 1931 | Bhavani Talwar | ND Sarpotdar | Aryan Film Co., Pune |
| 1931 | Nako Ga Bai Lagna | ND Sarpotdar | Aryan Film Co., Pune |
| 1931 | Raj Nandini | Dinkar Bidkar | Aryan Film Co., Pune |
| 1931 | Satyawan Savitri | Dinkar Bidkar | Aryan Film Co., Pune |
| 1931 | Krishna Maya | GV Sane | Aryan Film Co., Pune |
| 1931 | Sultana Chandbibi | ND Sarpotdar | Aryan Film Co., Pune |
| 1932 | Shyam Sundar | | |
| 1933 | Vijay Danka | Baburao chavan | Shri Ramesh Film, Bangalore |
| 1933 | Rukmini Haran | ND Sarpotdar | Imperial film |
| 1934 | Devaki | ND Sarpotdar | Imperial film |
| 1934 | Krishna Arjuna Yodha | Vishram Bedekar | |
| 1934-5 | Chalta Putala | ND Sarpotdar | Imperial film |
| | Goswami Tulsidas | GV Sane | |
| | War between Vali and Sugriva | Shinde | Hindustan Film Co. Nasik |

=== List of talkie Marathi movies ===
| Year | Film | Director | Producer/Film company |
|---|---|---|---|
| 1937 | Dharmaveer | Master Vinayak | Huns Picture |
| 1938 | Chandrarao More | Mr Arolkar | General Pictures |
| 1938 | Duniya Kya Hai | GP Pawar | Uday Picture |
| 1939 | Netaji Palkar | Bhalji Pendharkar | Arun Picture |
| 1939 | Raja Sriyal | G P Pawar | Uday Picture |
| 1939 | Bhagwa Zhenda | Bhalji Pendharkar | Saraswati Cinetone |
| 1943 | Chimulka Sansar | Master Vinayak | Praful Chitra |
| 1943 | Mazhe Bal | Master Vinayak | Praful Picture |
| 1944 | Gaja Bhau | Master Vinayak | Praful Picture |

=== List of films (as makeup director) ===
- 1937 Dharmaveer
- 1943 Chimukala sansar
- 1944 Gajabhau
- 1962 Ek musafir Ek Hasina
- 1963 Yeh Rastey hen pyar ke
- Alif Laila
- Love in Simla
- Halaku
- Khazanchi
- Neelofer
- Chor Bazar
- Sitra
