= Bauria railway station =

Railway station in West Bengal, India

Bauria
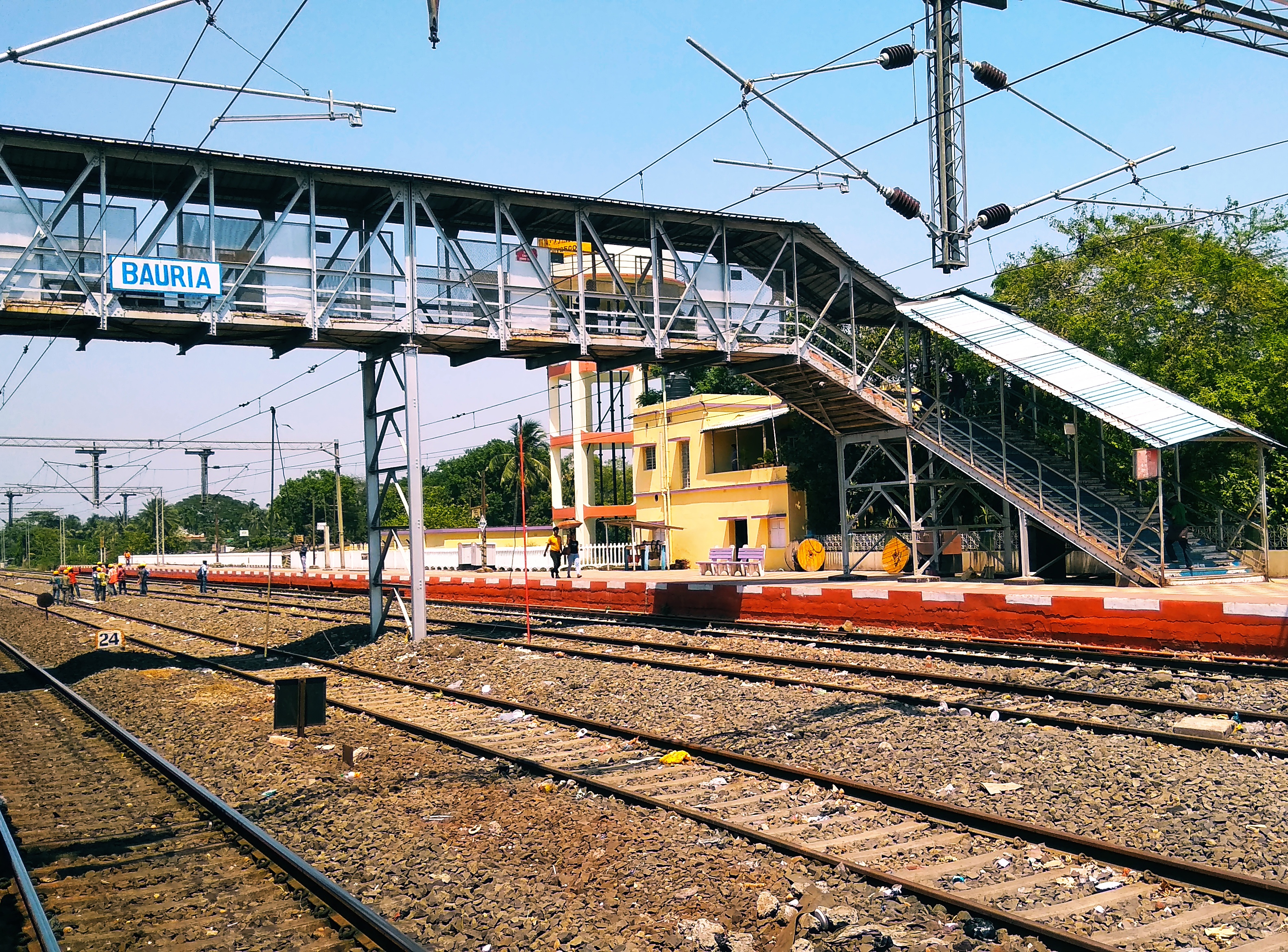
- Bauria Railway Station

General information
- Location: Bauria, Howrah district, West Bengal; India
- Coordinates: 22°30′10″N 88°09′48″E
- Elevation: 6 metres (20 ft)
- System: Kolkata Suburban Railway
- Owner: Indian Railways
- Line: Howrah–Kharagpur line
- Platforms: 5

Construction
- Structure type: Standard on-ground station
- Parking: No
- Cycle facilities: yes

Other information
- Station code: BVA
- Fare zone: South Eastern Railway

History
- Opened: 1900
- Electrified: 1967–69

Services
Preceding station	Kolkata Suburban Railway	Following station
Chengel towards Midnapore	South Eastern Line Howrah–Kharagpur line	Nalpur towards Howrah Junction
Route map
Location
- Location within West Bengal

The Bauria railway station serves Bauria, Howrah district, in the Indian state of West Bengal. It is situated on the Howrah–Kharagpur line, at a distance of 24 km (15 mi) from the terminus of Howrah Station.

== History ==
The Howrah–Kharagpur line was opened in 1900.

== Tracks ==
The Howrah–Panskura stretch has three lines.

== Electrification ==
The Howrah–Kharagpur line was electrified in 1967–69.
