= Indian Institute of Science Education and Research, Bhopal =

Research and education institute in Madhya Pradesh, India

- Motto: Vidyayā amṛutaṃ aśnute
- Motto in English: Eat nectar through knowledge, i.e. be immortal through knowledge
- Type: Research Institute
- Established: 2008; 18 years ago
- Founder: Vinod K. Singh
- Parent institution: Ministry of Human Resources Department, Government of India
- Chairperson: Jyeshtharaj Joshi
- Academic staff: 160
- Students: 2,554
- Undergraduates: 1,629
- Postgraduates: 113
- Doctoral students: 812
- Location: Bhopal Bypass Road, Bhauri, Bhopal, Madhya Pradesh, 462 066, India; 23.285832°N 77.275654°E
- Website: www.iiserb.ac.in

Indian Institute of Science Education and Research, Bhopal (IISERB or IISER Bhopal) is a prestigious autonomous research institute in Bhauri, Bhopal district, Madhya Pradesh, India. It was established by the Ministry of Education (India), Government of India in 2008 in order to incorporate research in fundamental science at undergraduate and graduate level, with equal emphasis on higher education for research and education in science. It is an autonomous institution awarding its own degrees.

== History ==
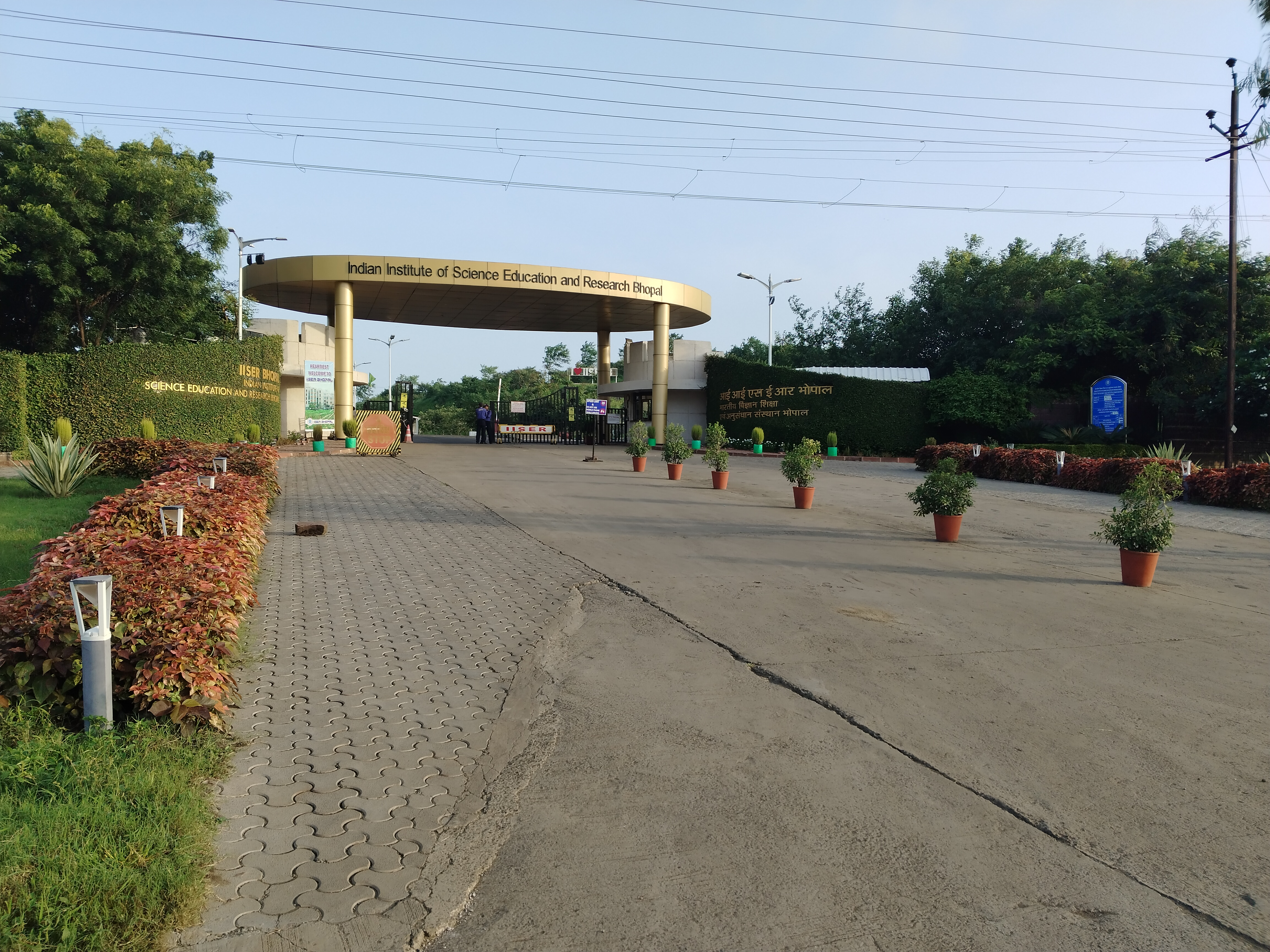
Entrance gate of IISER-B

Indian Institutes of Science Education and Research (IISERs) were created in 2006 through a proclamation of Ministry of Human Resource Development, Government of India, under the category of institutes of national importance, to promote quality education and research in basic sciences. Soon after the announcement, two of these institutes at Pune and Kolkata, respectively, were started in 2006. This was followed by institutes at Mohali (2007), Bhopal and Thiruvananthapuram (2008), Tirupati (2015) and Berhampur (2016). Each IISER is a degree granting autonomous institution with a prime focus to integrate science, education and research.

== Departments ==
Natural Sciences

- Department of Biological Sciences
- Department of Chemistry
- Department of Earth and Environmental Sciences
- Department of Mathematics
- Department of Physics

Engineering Sciences

- Department of Chemical Engineering
- Department of Data Science and Engineering
- Department of Electrical Engineering and Computer Science

Humanities and Social Sciences

- Department of Economic Sciences
- Department of Humanities and Social Sciences

== Academics ==
=== Academic Programmes ===
IISER Bhopal offers Bachelor of Science - Master of Science (BS-MS) Dual Degree, Bachelor of Science (BS), Bachelors of Technology (B.Tech), Master of Science (M.Sc.), Integrated PhD and PhD programmes.

==== Bachelor of Science – Master of Science (BS-MS) Dual Degree ====
The five year BS-MS (Dual Degree) programme is offered in Biological Sciences, Chemistry, Mathematics, Physics,Data Science & Engineering, and Earth & Environmental Sciences (EES).

The first year of the programme consists of mandatory, common courses (core courses) from Natural and Engineering Sciences as well as interdisciplinary courses from Humanities and Social Sciences. The second year of the programme enables students to choose thee pre-major disciplines that guide them to make an informed choice of major/minor discipline in the third year. In pre-major student must have to register for three departments consisting different courses. Third year onwards, students register for professional courses consisting of discipline dependent mandatory and elective courses. During the final year, students are required to register for MS thesis with a faculty supervisor, relevant to their major discipline.

In addition to majoring in one of the disciplines, students can also minor in another discipline by fulfilling criteria specified by individual departments.

The institute encourages and rewards academic excellence exhibited by its students. To this end, Professor C. N. R. Rao Education Foundation Prize, with a prize amount of ₹ 5000/- per semester is awarded to the student scoring the highest CPI during the first year (first and second semesters) of the BS-MS (Dual Degree) programme.

In addition, the institute awards the President's Gold Medal for the best academic performance in the graduating class in all disciplines of the BS-MS programme. Proficiency Medals are the awarded for the best academic performance in each discipline of the BS-MS programme to the graduating class. The Director's Gold Medal is awarded for outstanding all-round achievement and leadership in the graduating class amongst all disciplines.

==== Bachelor of Science (BS) in economics ====
The BS programme consists of core courses in basic sciences and introductory courses in Economics during the first year. After spending four years in the BS Programme, the students have the option to obtain BS-MS (Dual Degree) in Economics by spending an additional year devoted to courses and a research project. Moreover, the students of the BS Programme in Economics can also earn a ‘minor’ degree in other disciplines after fulfilling the criteria laid down by the respective department.

==== Bachelor of Technology (B.Tech) ====
Starting from 2025, IISER Bhopal is offering a B.Tech in

- Chemical Engineering
- Data science and Engineering
- Electrical Engineering and Computer Science

==== Master of Art (MA) in Liberal Arts ====
Starting from 2025, IISER Bhopal is offering two-year MA programme in Liberal arts offered by the Humanities and Social Science (HSS) Department. This would be the first arts programme across all IISERs. Courses are offered in the degree from fields like Literature, Philosophy, Sociology and Social Anthropology, Cognitive Science and Psychology. In addition to the courses, in their 3rd and 4th semester, students have to write a dissertation on a specific topic.

==== Master of Science (M.Sc.) ====
The two years M.Sc. Programme is offered for students with bachelor’s degree in relevant discipline. The programme is currently offered in the Departments of Biological Science, Chemistry and Mathematics with an aim to integrate classroom learning with research and provides ample scope for multidisciplinary interactions. The training during the programme enables students to pursue a career in academia, R&D institutes, and science-based industries.

==== Integrated Doctoral Programme (Integrated PhD) ====
The institute offers Integrated PhD programme in Chemistry, Mathematics, and Physics. All admitted students will receive a fellowship of ₹ 10,000/- per month. Subsequently, upon successful completion of PhD candidacy requirements, a revised fellowship will be provided as per the Ministry of Education (MoE) norms/guidelines.

==== Doctoral programme (PhD) ====
Admission to the doctoral programme is after a master's degree in science. Besides the students of the Integrated Master's programme, postgraduate students with a master's degree in science from other universities or institutes are also admitted to the doctoral programme.

The institute also offers PhD programmes in all disciplines. All selected candidates not receiving external fellowship are awarded an Institute fellowship. Currently, the institute offers PhD programmes in the following disciplines: Biological Sciences, Chemistry, Chemical Engineering, Earth and Environmental Sciences, Electrical Engineering & Computer Science, Mathematics, Physics, and Humanities and Social Sciences. All doctoral students are also expected to participate in the undergraduate teaching programme of the Institute as a part of their training. The programme involved course work, a qualifying examination, a state-of-the-art seminar, thesis work, open seminar and a thesis examination, leading to the award of a PhD degree.

==== Postdoctoral Studies ====
Postdoctoral studies are possible in Biology, Chemistry, Earth and Environmental Sciences, Mathematics, Physics, Chemical Engineering, Electrical Engineering, Computer Science, and Humanities and Social Sciences.

=== Central Library ===
The Central Library of IISER Bhopal is an integral academic resource centre located within the institute’s campus. It supports the teaching, learning, and research activities of the institute by providing access to a comprehensive collection of resources in various disciplines, including Basic Sciences, Engineering, Humanities, Economic Sciences, and interdisciplinary areas. The library currently houses a collection of approximately 15,000 books, covering core disciplines taught at IISER Bhopal. Apart from academic textbooks and reference materials, the collection includes:

- Research monographs and lab-specific resources
- General reading materials including fiction, stories, and light reading
- Magazines, encyclopaedias, and dictionaries
- Historical works and literature on the History of Science

To meet the diverse needs of students and faculty, the library offers a broad spectrum of services. These include online catalogue access (OPAC), library membership and borrowing facilities, inter-library loan and document delivery services, and remote access through the MyLOFT platform. Users can book discussion rooms, attend library orientation programs, and recommend new books for acquisition. Additional support is available through photocopy facilities, arrival alerts for new books, and video guides for navigating library services.

The library also provides access to a wide array of digital resources. These include subscribed e-resources, bibliographic databases, archives of theses and dissertations, video repositories, and open-access educational content such as the Open Textbook Library. The Institutional Repository serves as a digital archive for the institute’s scholarly output.

To support academic writing and research integrity, tools such as Turnitin (plagiarism detection), Grammarly, and QuillBot are made available. The library also facilitates access to reference management and data analysis tools, along with assistance for research ID creation.

The Central Library is open daily from 9:00 AM to 1:00 AM, with extended hours until 2:00 AM during examination periods to accommodate students’ increased academic workload.

==== Computer Laboratories ====
The Central Library building at IISER Bhopal also houses several computer laboratories that support academic computing, programming courses, and self-paced learning. These labs are equipped with high-performance systems and are available for both scheduled instructional use and individual student access.

There are four major computer labs:

1. CC Lab 1 (58 seats)
2. CC Lab 2 (45 seats)
3. CC Lab 4 (112 seats)
4. CC BYOD(Bring-Your-Own-Device) Lab (23 seats), which allows students to bring and connect their own devices

These labs are available for use from 9:00 AM to 12:00 AM (midnight) on weekdays, and from 9:00 AM to 5:00 PM on weekends. Lab access is managed through an online booking system, which enables faculties to reserve spaces as per their academic requirements and lab availability.

==== Discussion Rooms ====
In addition to the computer laboratories, the Central Library at IISER Bhopal offers two dedicated discussion rooms designed to facilitate group study, meetings, and collaborative academic work. Both rooms are equipped with round tables suitable for conference-style discussions, as well as a green board and a projector to support presentations and interactive learning.

One of the discussion rooms can be reserved online through the library’s booking system, allowing students and faculty to schedule sessions in advance. The other room operates on a walk-in basis, available for use without prior booking, making it accessible for impromptu meetings and group discussions.

=== Ranking ===
University rankings

General – India
- NIRF (Overall) (2024): 78

Indian Institute of Science Education and Research, Bhopal ranked 78th by the National Institutional Ranking Framework in overall ranking in 2024.

== Student life ==
=== Students Activity Council ===
Students Activity Council (SAC) is a union of the students for organisation of extracurricular activities in the institute and to address their concerns. It is totally managed, organised and maintained by the students themselves. SAC contains 8 different Activity Councils:

- Computing and Networking Council.
- Cultural Council.
- Fine Arts and Literary Council.
- Science Council.
- Sports Council.
- Student Development Council.
- Environmental and Social Initiative Council.
- Representatives' Council.
- Centre for Science and Society

IISER Bhopal hosted the 4th Inter IISER Sports Meet (IISM 2015), 9 institutes participated in this event ( 6 IISERs, IISc, NISER, CBS Mumbai). The institute also organised a Summer Outreach Camp from 15–21 May 2022. Roughly 95 students had attended the camp from all over India for the same.

IISER Bhopal hosts two annual festivals. Enthuzia is the cultural festival of IISER Bhopal. It was started in 2010. Enthuzia '19 witnessed Zakir Khan, the Indian comedian, as one of the performers. Singularity is the annual science festival of IISER Bhopal. Singularity'16, the third edition, witnessed K. Radhakrishnan as keynote speaker.
