= Bhauri =

- village
- Location within Madhya Pradesh Location within India
- Coordinates: 23.280004°N 77.275118°E
- Country: India
- State: Madhya Pradesh
- District: Bhopal
- Tehsil: Huzur

Population (2011)
  - Total: 3,031
- Time zone: UTC+5:30 (IST)
- PIN: 462066
- ISO 3166 code: MP-IN
- Census code: 482463

Bhauri is a village in the Bhopal district of Madhya Pradesh, India. It is located in the Huzur tehsil and the Phanda block. Bhauri has been included in Bhopal Municipal Corporation in 2015 by Gazette Notification of Government of Madhya Pradesh. The IISER Bhopal is located in Bhauri, beside the Bhopal Bypass Road. School of Planning and Architecture (SPA) Bhopal, an Institute of National Importance under Ministry of Human Resource Development, is located in Bhauri village. SPA is accessed by Neelbad Road from Bhopal Bypass. The road is under construction. Madhya Pradesh Police Academy is also situated in Bhauri village.

== Demographics ==
According to the 2011 census of India, Bhauri has 575 households. The effective literacy rate (i.e. the literacy rate of population excluding children aged 6 and below) is 77.5%.

Demographics (2011 Census)
	Total	Male	Female
Population	3031	1538	1493
Children aged below 6 years	466	240	226
Scheduled caste	253	135	118
Scheduled tribe	323	155	168
Literates	1988	1128	860
Workers (all)	1355	800	555
Main workers (total)	922	707	215
Main workers: Cultivators	293	270	23
Main workers: Agricultural labourers	376	221	155
Main workers: Household industry workers	41	34	7
Main workers: Other	212	182	30
Marginal workers (total)	433	93	340
Marginal workers: Cultivators	200	25	175
Marginal workers: Agricultural labourers	158	36	122
Marginal workers: Household industry workers	28	7	21
Marginal workers: Others	47	25	22
Non-workers	1676	738	938
