= Kishore Vaigyanik Protsahan Yojana =

Indian government scholarship programme

Kishore Vaigyanik Protsahan Yojana Examination
- Acronym: KVPY
- Type: Computer-based
- Administrator: Indian Institute of Science (IISc)
- Skills tested: For SA Physics, Chemistry, Mathematics and Biology; For SB/SX Physics, Chemistry, Mathematics, Biology (Any Three for Part 1 and Any Two for Part 2)
- Purpose: Admission to Undergraduate Science Courses of B.S. in IISC, IISER and IIIT Hyderabad with Fellowship during basic science Studies and Free Entry to all National Libraries in India.
- Year started: 1999
- Year terminated: 2022
- Duration: 3 Hours
- Score range: - 76 to +100 in SA; - 25 to 100 SB/SX
- Offered: Once a year
- Regions: India
- Languages: English and Hindi
- Annual number of test takers: 5,50,000 (in 2019)
- Website: kvpy.iisc.ac.in

Kishore Vaigyanik Protsahan Yojana (English: Young Scientist Incentive Plan) (KVPY) used to be a scholarship programme funded by the Department of Science and Technology of the Government of India, aimed at encouraging students to take up research careers in the areas of basic sciences. It offered scholarships and contingency grants up to the pre-PhD level to selected students. Begun in 1999, it was administered by the Indian Institute of Science. The students who qualified in the KVPY Exam were eligible for a fellowship as well as admissions into institutes like the IISc and the IISER based on additional criteria. This exam had 3 Streams: SA (Class 11), SX (Class 12), and SB (First year BSc). Streams SP Basic Sciences (Class 11, 12 and First-year BSc, BTech) and SP Medicine (First-year MBBS) were discontinued since 2012–13. On 18 July 2022, the KVPY website announced the decision of DST to subsume KVPY with INSPIRE. KVPY Aptitude test will not be conducted from the year 2022 onwards. Ongoing KVPY fellows will continue to receive fellowship as per norms from DST.

== Rewards ==
1. The students who qualify KVPY Exam are eligible for the fellowship. The students receive a fellowship from 1st year onwards of their graduation (science field).

2. The KVPY fellows receive ₹5,000.00 monthly fellowship from 1st to 3rd year of B.Sc/ B.Stat/ B.S./ B.Maths/ Integrated M.S./M.Sc and an annual contingency grant of ₹20,000. After three years the fellowship is enhanced to ₹7,000.00 per month during M.Sc/2th and 7th year of Integrated M.S./M.Sc and an annual contingency grant of ₹28,000.00.

3. KVPY Fellows are also eligible to get the DST Inspire Scholarship granted by Department of Science & Technology (DST) Government of India worth ₹80,000.00 annually.

== See also ==
- Junior Science Talent Search Examination (for grade 9 students only)
