= Research fellow =

Academic research position

A research fellow is an academic research position at a university or a similar research institution, usually for academic staff or faculty members. A research fellow may act either as an independent investigator or under the supervision of a principal investigator.

Research fellow positions vary in different countries and academic institutions.

== India ==
In India, the position of research fellowship is provided to scholars from various streams like science, arts, literature, management, and others: the government, academics, research institutes, and private companies fund research fellowships. Research fellows research under the supervision of experienced faculty, professors, heads of department, and the Dean on two different posts known as Junior Research Fellowship (JRF) and senior research fellow (SRF). Research organisations like ICAR, CSIR, UGC, ICMR recruit research fellows through National Eligibility Test. After the completion of pre-defined tenure, JRF can be considered for a senior research fellowship based on the research fellow's performance and/or an interview conducted by the committee of the research institute.

== Russian Federation ==
In the Russian Federation, the position and title research fellow is unknown; however, there is a broadly similar position of (Russian: Научный сотрудник, lit. 'scientific worker'). This position normally requires a degree of Candidate of Sciences approximately corresponding to the PhD. More senior positions normally require, in addition to the degree mentioned above, a track record of publications or certified inventions, as well as practical contributions to major research and development projects.

Hierarchy of researching positions in the Russian Academy of Sciences
Translation (variant)	Original	Russian abbreviation	Scientific degree or job seniority required	Number of publications required
junior researcher	младший научный сотрудник	м. н. с.	Candidate of Sciences or 3 years	1 in 5 years
researcher	научный сотрудник	н. с.	Candidate of Sciences or 5 years	3 in 5 years
senior researcher	старший научный сотрудник	с. н. с.	Candidate of Sciences or 10 years	5 in 5 years
leading researcher	ведущий научный сотрудник	в. н. с.	Doctor of Sciences or Candidate of Sciences (in exceptionary cases)	7 in 5 years
principal researcher	главный научный сотрудник	г. н. с.	Doctor of Sciences	10 in 5 years

== South Africa ==
Research fellows in South Africa are considered an asset to research organisations and universities. There are highly ranked universities such as University of the Witwatersrand, University of Stellenbosch Business School, and Rhodes University which offer fellowships to South African nationals in certain fields of research.

== United Kingdom ==
In the United Kingdom, a research fellow is a broad category, used to indicate a scholar on a research-oriented professional development track. In many universities, a research fellow is a career grade of a Research Career Pathway, following on from a postdoctoral position such as research associate, and may be open-ended, subject to normal probation regulations. For some universities, research career grades roughly correspond to the grades of the academic pathway in the following way: research fellow (a lower or same grade as a lecturer), principal research fellow—reader, whereas senior research fellow is somewhere between a lecturer and senior lecturer or associate professor. Some universities, such as Cambridge, restrict Professorial grades only to academics who have excelled in both teaching and research. Outside of faculty appointments, the title of "Research Fellow" or "Senior Research Fellows" can be also used as honorary or temporary awarded "fellowships" to distinguished academics by research institutes or colleges, usually from different institutions.

=== Professorial Fellows ===
At University College, Oxford, Professorial Fellows are the holders of Statutory Chairs, the most senior professorships at Oxford: they are members of the College's Governing Body.

=== Senior Research Fellows ===
Senior Research Fellowships (SRFs) are awarded to researchers with "academic standing comparable to that of a distinguished research professorship at a major university." They recognize scholars with distinguished research records and publications. This position originated in the 15th century as a way of allowing scholars time and funding to pursue independent research without having teaching duties.

As with the professorial fellows, senior research fellows are research-only posts; with the rise of the career grade, there will normally be a formal requirement of a moderate amount of teaching and/or supervision (often at postgraduate level). At All Souls College, Oxford, senior research fellows are 7-year-long positions that are equivalent to a tenured position in the United States. This position is equivalent to a full professorship.

=== List of research fellowships ===
Fellowships by funding bodies
Funding body	Fellowship
Wellcome Trust	Wellcome Trust Principal Research Fellow
Leverhulme Trust	Early Career Fellowships; Emeritus Fellowships; International Academic Fellowships; Major Research Fellowships; Research Fellowships
Royal Society	Royal Society University Research Fellowship; Newton International Fellowship

== See also ==
- Fellow
- Lecturer
- List of academic ranks
- Research assistant
- Research associate
