= IITT =

IITT may refer to:

- IITT is an acronym for Indian Institute of Technology Tirupati, an institute centrally funded by MHRD, INDIA
- IITT college of Engineering, Kala Amb, an institution of higher education in the state of Himachal Pradesh, INDIA
