= Institution of Electronics and Telecommunication Engineers =

Indian professional society

The Institution of Electronics and Telecommunication Engineers
- Abbreviation: IETE
- Formation: 1953
- Purpose: Professional engineering education
- Headquarters: IETE, 2, Institutional Area, Lodhi Road, New Delhi, 110003, India
- Members: HF (Honorary Fellow), DF (Distinguished Fellow), F (Fellow), M (Member), AMIETE (Associate, by examination)
- Website: www.iete.org

Location of the IETE centers (in green) and sub centers (in red)

The Institution of Electronics and Telecommunication Engineers (IETE) is a professional society in India focused on electronics, telecommunication, and information technology. Established on 2 November 1953, it has around 120,000 members across 63 different centres, including 3 located abroad.

The Government of India has recognized IETE as a Scientific and Industrial Research Organization (SIRO) and as an Institute of National Eminence. The IETE conducts and sponsors technical meetings, conferences, symposiums, and exhibitions all over India, publishes technical and research journals and provides continuing education as well as career advancement opportunities to its members. IETE is a member of ECI.

== History ==
The Institution of Electronics and Telecommunication Engineers (IETE) was established on 2 November 1953 to promote the study and practice of electronics and telecommunication in India. It was inaugurated by Dr. Sarvepalli Radhakrishnan, the then Vice President of India. The institution was later incorporated under the Societies Registration Act (1860).

== Academic programs ==
Since 1953, IETE has expanded its educational activities in areas of electronics, telecommunications, computer science, and information technology. The institution conducts programs by examination, leading to professional qualification and certifications recognized for higher education and government recruitment.

=== Courses offered ===
==== DipIETE ====
DipIETE is a three-year, six-semester course equivalent to Diploma in Engineering.

==== AMIETE ====
AMIETE is a four-year, eight-semester course recognized by the AICTE and MHRD, Government of India, as equivalent to B.E. or B.Tech degree. The Association of Indian Universities (AIU), Union Public Service Commission (UPSC) have recognized AMIETE.

==== ALCCS (Advanced Level Course in Computer Science) ====
A postgraduate-level course equivalent to an M.Tech degree. The Association of Indian Universities (AIU), Union Public Service Commission (UPSC) have recognized ALCCS.

=== Examination and recognition ===
The examinations are conducted twice a year, once in June and in December. Courses are divided into two sections, Section A and Section B. IETE graduates are eligible to take national-level tests like GATE, CAT, JEST, etc., for Master's as well as for PhD admissions in various leading technical institutions across the country.

Courses of IETE are recognized by various leading technical and scientific institutions and universities including IISc, IIT, NIT, IIIT, IIM, CMI, TIFR, ISI, and various Central and State Universities. The Institution provides leadership in scientific and technical areas of direct importance to the national development and economy.

== Recognition history ==
The IETE has faced significant legal challenges regarding the equivalence of its courses certifications to university degrees.

=== The Ministry of Human Resource Development (MHRD) de-recognition (2012) ===
In December of 2012, the Ministry of Human Resource Development (MHRD) withdrew the recognition of degrees awarded by professional societies. This impacted thousands of students who enrolled in IETE and similar bodies based on their long-standing recognition.

=== Student agitations ===
Following the notification, the IETE student community organized several protests across India. Hundreds of students participated in hunger strikes and demonstrations at Jantar Mantar, New Delhi and the HRD Minister's residence in New Delhi.

=== All India Council for Technical Education (AICTE) recognition (2017) ===
In 2017, following an emergency meeting, the All India Council for Technical Education (AICTE) issued a new statement regarding the status of technical degrees and diplomas awarded by professional bodies, including IETE.

==== Restoration of equivalence ====
The AICTEE officialese that degrees and diplomas awarded by IETE and similar bodies to students enrolled on or before May 41 2013 would stand valid "for all purposes", covering both eligibility for higher education and employment in the government sector.

==== Impact on higher education admissions ====
During GATE 2020 when the organizing committee, IIT Delhi, issues a notice stating:

"Candidate who registered after May 31, 2013 for certification equivalent to B.E./B.Tech/B.Arch from any of the professional societies (IE, ICE, IETE, AeSI, IIChemE, IIM, IIE, etc) but meets other eligibility criteria, are also eligible to apply for GATE 2020. However, as the matter is subjudice, the eligibility of such candidates is subjected to further orders of the court."

== Notable members ==
- Audimulapu Suresh (F), Minister of Municipal Administration and Urban Development
