= Kalidindi (surname) =

Kalidindi (Telugu: కలిదిండి) is a Telugu surname. Notable people with the surname include:

- Kalidindi Suryana Naga Sanyasi Raju (born 1970), Indian politician
- Kalidindi Satyanarayana, Indian academic administrator
