= Pranawachandra Deshmukh =

Indian physicist, educator and administrator

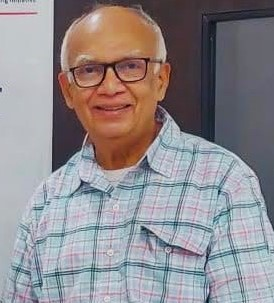
- Born: 12 September 1950 (age 76); Amravati, India
- Education: Nagpur University (B.Sc., M.Sc., PhD)
- Awards: ANRF Prime Minister Professor
- Scientific career
- Fields: Atomic & Molecular Physics; Attosecond science Quantum Information Science; Mathematical Physics
- Workplaces: Central University of Kerala; Indian Institute of Technology Madras; Indian Institute of Technology Mandi; Indian Institute of Technology Tirupati; Indian Institute of Science Education and Research Tirupati; Dayananda Sagar University, Bengaluru; RV University; Vivekananda Institute of Professional Studies, New Delhi.
- Doctoral advisor: Dr. Chintamani Mande; Dr. P. L. Khare
- Website: schools.cukerala.ac.in/Dept/Dept_Physics

Pranawachandra Deshmukh is an Indian physicist and educator renowned for his contributions to theoretical atomic physics, atomic collisions, light–matter interactions, ultrafast atomic processes, and applications of Lambert W Function in pure and applied physics. He has made significant contributions to physics education, including publishing foundational classical and quantum physics textbooks. Throughout his teaching career, he has instructed courses in classical mechanics, electrodynamics, quantum mechanics, and quantum collision physics. Many of his lectures are freely accessible through the National Programme on Technology Enhanced Learning(NPTEL), Swayamprabha where they benefit students and educators across India and beyond. His research group is one of the main contributors to the relativistic many-body studies of atomic photoionization, particularly the photoionization processes of free and confined atoms. His work includes studies of attosecond time delay, highlighting the role of electron correlations, relativistic effects and interchannel coupling. His broader research interests also include quantum information science and mathematical physics.

Prof. Deshmukh has authored over 300 research publications, including approximately 150 journal articles and around 200 conference contributions. He has supervised 17 doctoral theses and over 20 master's and undergraduate theses.

Prof. Deshmukh has been awarded the prestigious ANRF Prime Minister Professorship in Dec 2025. Currently, he serves as a professor in the Dept. of Physics, Central University of Kerala where he plans to mentor researchers and help build an advanced research eco-system. Prior to this he was the Founder-Convenor and Mentor of the Center for Atomic, Molecular, and Optical Sciences ad Technologies (CAMOST) in Tirupati. CAMOST is a joint initiative of the Indian Institute of Technology Tirupati (IITT) and the Indian Institute of Science Education and Research Tirupati (IISERT). Concurrently, he is RV Chair Professor at the Centre for Quantum Science and Technology (CQST), School of Computer Science and Engineering (SoCSE) at RV University, where he guides research and educational efforts in quantum science, drawing on his vast expertise to support the center's growth and innovation. Besides, he is the Chief Technology Advisor to the Vivekananda Institute of Professional Studies (VIPS), Delhi

== Early life and education ==
Deshmukh was born in Amravati, Maharashtra, on 12 September 1950. He completed his higher education in Nagpur, where he studied at the Saraswathi Vidyalaya, Hadas High School, Institute of Science, and the Postgraduate Department of Physics of Nagpur University. He obtained a Bachelor of Science degree in 1970 and a Master of Science (Physics) in 1972. After his master's degree, he obtained a Ph.D. in physics at Nagpur University in 1979 under the supervision of Dr. C. Mande and Dr. P. L. Khare.

== Career and research ==
Following his doctoral work, Deshmukh was a DANIDA fellow at the University of Aarhus in the Department of Theoretical Chemistry (1978–1979), where he worked with Professor Jan Linderberg. He then worked as a research associate at the University of Notre Dame with Professor Robert Hayes and Professor W. R. Johnson. From 1980 until 1983, Deshmukh was a research associate and adjunct assistant professor at Georgia State University, collaborating with Professor S. T. Manson.

In 1984, Deshmukh joined the Department of Physics at the Indian Institute of Technology Madras as an assistant professor of physics, becoming a full professor in 1995, a position he held until 2016. During his tenure at IIT Madras, he was appointed on deputation as professor of physics and dean of academics at the Indian Institute of Technology Mandi (2009–2010).

In 2016, Deshmukh joined the Indian Institute of Technology Tirupati as a professor of physics. Simultaneously, the Indian Institute of Science Education and Research Tirupati invited him to deliver several courses and mentor its students. In 2020, Deshmukh set up CAMOST, a joint initiative of IITT and IISERT.

Professor Pranawachandra Deshmukh has supervised numerous Ph.D. students: Dr. N. Shanthi, Dr. R. Padma, Dr. E. W. B. Dias, Dr. Tanima Banerjee, Dr. Hari R Varma, Dr. S. Sunil Kumar, Dr. Jobin Jose, Dr. Gagan Bihari Pradhan, Dr. Manas Ranjan Parida, Dr. N. M. Murthy, Dr. K. Sindhu, Dr. A. K. Yadav, Dr. Arthi Ganeshan, Dr. Ummal Momeen, Dr. Soumyajit Saha, Dr. Ankur Mondal, and Dr. Sourav Banerjee.

== Notable Positions ==
- Visiting Scientist, Georgia State University, Atlanta (often, since 1985).
- Visiting Scientist, University of Aarhus, Denmark: 1991
- Senior Research Associate, International Center for Theoretical Physics, Trieste, Italy: 2002-2009
- Head of the Department of Physics, IIT Madras: 2006-2009
- Head of the School of Basic Sciences, and Dean (Academics), IIT Mandi: 2009-2010
- Visiting professor, The Western University of London, Ontario, Canada: 2011
- Western Fellow, The Western University of London, Ontario, Canada: 2013-2014
- Visiting/Adjunct Professor, Indian Institute of Science Education and Research Tirupati: 2015-2018
- Dean, Sponsored Research and Consultancy, IIT Tirupati: 2016-2020
- Mentor and Convener, Center for Atomic, Molecular, and Optical Sciences and Technologies (CAMOST): Since 2020

== Publications ==
=== Books and monographs ===
- Foundations of Classical Mechanics, Cambridge University Press (2019), Foundation of Classical Mechanics
- Quantum Collisions and Confinement of Atomic and Molecular Species, and Photons, Chief Editor; Published by Springer (2019)
- Quantum Mechanics – Formalism, Methodologies, and Applications, Cambridge University Press (2023) Quantum Mechanics – Formalism, Methodologies, and Applications

== Services ==
- Convener, 11th National Conference of Atomic and Molecular Physics, Indian Society for Atomic and Molecular Physics: December 1996
- Secretary, Indian Society for Atomic and Molecular Physics: 2001–2003
- Vice President, Indian Society for Atomic and Molecular Physics: 2003-2004
- President, Indian Society for Atomic and Molecular Physics: 2005-2006
- Member, International Advisory Committee, Asian International Seminar on Atomic and Molecular Physics: 2004–2007, 2011–2016
- Convener, 7th Asian International Seminar on Atomic and Molecular Physics: December 4–7, 2006
- Convener, 7th Topical Conference of the Indian Society for Atomic and Molecular Physics: January 6–8, 2018
- Convener, AAMOS20 - Advances in Atomic, Molecular, and Optical Sciences: December 14–18, 2020
- Member, Board of Editors, Institute of Physics Journal - Physica Scripta: Ongoing
- Member, Indian Association of Physics Teachers

== Selected Talks ==
- Why is reality NON-LOCAL?
- Attosecond dynamics
- Time and time delay in atomic dynamics
- The only principle that required explanation in terms of two different phenomena
- How come Newton's laws works?

=== Selected bibliography ===
- Deshmukh, P C; Mandal, A; Saha, S; Kheifets, A S; Dolmatov, V K (May 2014). "Attosecond time delay in the photoionization of endohedral atoms A@C60: A probe of confinement resonances". Physical Review A. 89 (5) 053424. arXiv:1402.2348. Bibcode:2014PhRvA..89e3424D. doi:10.1103/PhysRevA.89.053424. S2CID 119310612.
- Banerjee, Sourav; Deshmukh, Pranawa C.; Dolmatov, Valeriy K; Manson, Steven T; Kheifets, A S (January 2019). "Strong dependence of photoionization time delay on energy and angle in the neighborhood of Fano resonances". Physical Review A. 99 (1) 013416. Bibcode:2019PhRvA..99a3416B. doi:10.1103/PhysRevA.99.013416. hdl:1885/204836. S2CID 127975123.
- Narola, Harsh Bharatbhai; Deshmukh, P C; Scott, Robert B; Roberts, Ken; Valluri, S R (June 2020). "Lambert W function methods in double square well and waveguide problems". Journal of Physics Communications. 4 (6). Bibcode:2020JPhCo...4f5001B. doi:10.1088/2399-6528/ab92d9. S2CID 219437503.
- Banerjee, Sourav; Deshmukh, P C (30 November 2020). "Time delay in atomic and molecular collisions and photoionization /photodetachment". International Reviews in Physical Chemistry. 40 (1): 127–153. doi:10.1080/0144235X.2021.1838805. S2CID 229432692.
- Deshmukh, P C; Ganeshan, Aarthi; Banerjee, Sourav; Mandal, Ankur (June 2021). "Accidental Degeneracy of the Hydrogen Atom and its Non-accidental Solution in Parabolic Coordinates". Canadian Journal of Physics. 99 (10): 853–860. Bibcode:2021CaJPh..99..853D. doi:10.1139/cjp-2020-0258. S2CID 236311611.
- Deshmukh, P C; Banerjee, S; Mandal, A; Manson, S T (July 2021). "Eisenbud–Wigner–Smith time delay in atom–laser interactions". The European Physical Journal Special Topics. 230 (23): 4151–4164. Bibcode:2021EPJST.230.4151D. doi:10.1140/epjs/s11734-021-00225-7. OSTI 1903614. S2CID 237649587.
- Deshmukh, P C; Manson, S T (July 2021). "Photoionization of Atomic Systems Using the Random-Phase Approximation Including Relativistic Interactions". Atoms. 10 (3): 71. doi:10.3390/atoms10030071.
- Baral, S; Easwaran, Raghavan K; Jose, J; Ganeshan, Arthi; Deshmukh, P C (April 2023). "Temporal Response of Atoms Trapped in an Optical Dipole Trap: A Primer on Quantum Computing Speed". Atoms. 11 (4): 72. Bibcode:2023Atoms..11...72B. doi:10.3390/atoms11040072.
