= Jest (disambiguation) =

A jest is a joke.

Jest or JEST may also refer to:

- Jest (horse), a British racehorse
- Karsan Jest, a minibus
- Jest, a mobile phone model by Pantech
- Jest, a unit testing framework
- Joint Entrance Screening Test, an Indian entrance test for physics and theoretical computer science
