= UGC–NET =

National examination in India

University Grants CommissionNational Eligibility Test
- Acronym: UGC–NET
- Type: Computer based test (CBT)
- Administrator: National Testing Agency
- Year started: 1989–90
- Duration: 3 hours (180 minutes)
- Score range: 0–100 (Paper I); 0–200 (Paper II)
- Score validity: Five years (JRF); Lifetime (assistant professor); One year (PhD admission)
- Offered: Twice annually(Usually in the months of December and June).
- Restrictions on attempts: No restriction
- Regions: India
- Languages: Mainly English and Hindi
- Annual number of test takers: ▼5,44,485 (Dec 2021, June 2022 merged cycles)
- Prerequisites: Master's degree or equivalent Bachelor's of Technology 75% (JRF, PhD Only)
- Website: ugcnet.nta.nic.in

The University Grants Commission–National Eligibility Test (UGC–NET) is a standardised test in India conducted by the National Testing Agency (NTA) on behalf of the University Grants Commission. It is designed to determine the eligibility of candidates for: awarding of the Junior Research Fellowship (JRF), appointment as assistant professor, and admission to PhD in Indian universities and colleges. The exam can be taken in any one of the 85 subjects. The UGC–NET National Eligibility Test is in the list of the top 10 toughest exams in India.

Until July 2018, the Central Board of Secondary Education (CBSE) conducted the exam, which was taken over by the NTA since December 2018. Currently, the exam is being conducted twice a year in the months of June and December in CBT-mode. From December 2018 onward, NTA started releasing the UGC-NET e-certificate and JRF award letter online on its official website for the qualified candidates.

== Qualifying criteria ==
A student has to obtain the minimum qualifying marks in UGC–NET, with aggregate 55% and 50% in their postgraduate's or master's degree, for General and Others respectively. The paper is divided into two papers: Paper 1 and Paper 2. Paper 1 is a general exam containing 50 questions of two marks each, for a total of 100 marks. Paper 2 is a subject-specific exam containing 100 questions of two marks each, for a total of 200 marks. The candidates have to score a total of (both in papers 1 and 2) 150 questions in three hours. There is no separate cutoff for any of the papers and, the cutoff is decided on the aggregate marks. Amongst those candidates who have obtained minimum qualifying marks, a merit list is prepared subject-wise and category-wise using the aggregate marks of two papers secured by such candidates.

== SET/SLETs ==
A state-level equivalent exam of NET exam is conducted by the Indian states/UTs in their jurisdiction called State Eligibility Test/State Level Eligibility Test, determining eligibility for lectureship/assistant professorship at universities and colleges in that particular state/UT only.

== UGC NET Mandatory for PhD admission ==
The new guidelines of UGC, suggested the use of UGC NET scores for PhD admissions. For this purpose; a new qualification category "PhD only" was added from UGC NET June 2024 onwards. All universities of India have welcomed this change.

== See also ==
- List of Public service commissions in India
- List of Public Sector Undertakings in India
