= IIT Tirupati =

Research Institute in Tirupati, Andhra Pradesh, India

Coordinates: 13°42′52″N 79°35′43″E

Indian Institute of Technology, Tirupati
- College Logo
- Other name: IITT
- Type: Public
- Established: 2015; 11 years ago
- Accreditation: Institute of National Importance
- Affiliations: Ministry of Education (India)
- Chairman: Sajjan Jindal
- Director: K.N. Satyanarayana
- Academic staff: 143
- Administrative staff: 210
- Students: 1,168
- Undergraduates: 852
- Postgraduates: 167
- Doctoral students: 149
- Location: Yerpedu, Tirupati, India
- Campus: 540 acres (220 ha); Sub-Urban
- Language: English
- Colors: Red and Black
- Website: www.iittp.ac.in

The Indian Institute of Technology Tirupati (IIT-Tirupati or IIT-T) is an autonomous engineering and technology education institute located in Tirupati, Andhra Pradesh. Initially mentored by IIT Madras, IIT Tirupati is a 3rd generation IIT located in Yerpedu. The institute has a size of 548.11 acres, including a proposed research park. The Foundation stone for IIT Tirupati was laid by the Union Minister Smriti Irani and M. Venkaiah Naidu, the then Union Minister & former Vice President of India and N. Chandrababu Naidu, Chief Minister of Andhra Pradesh.

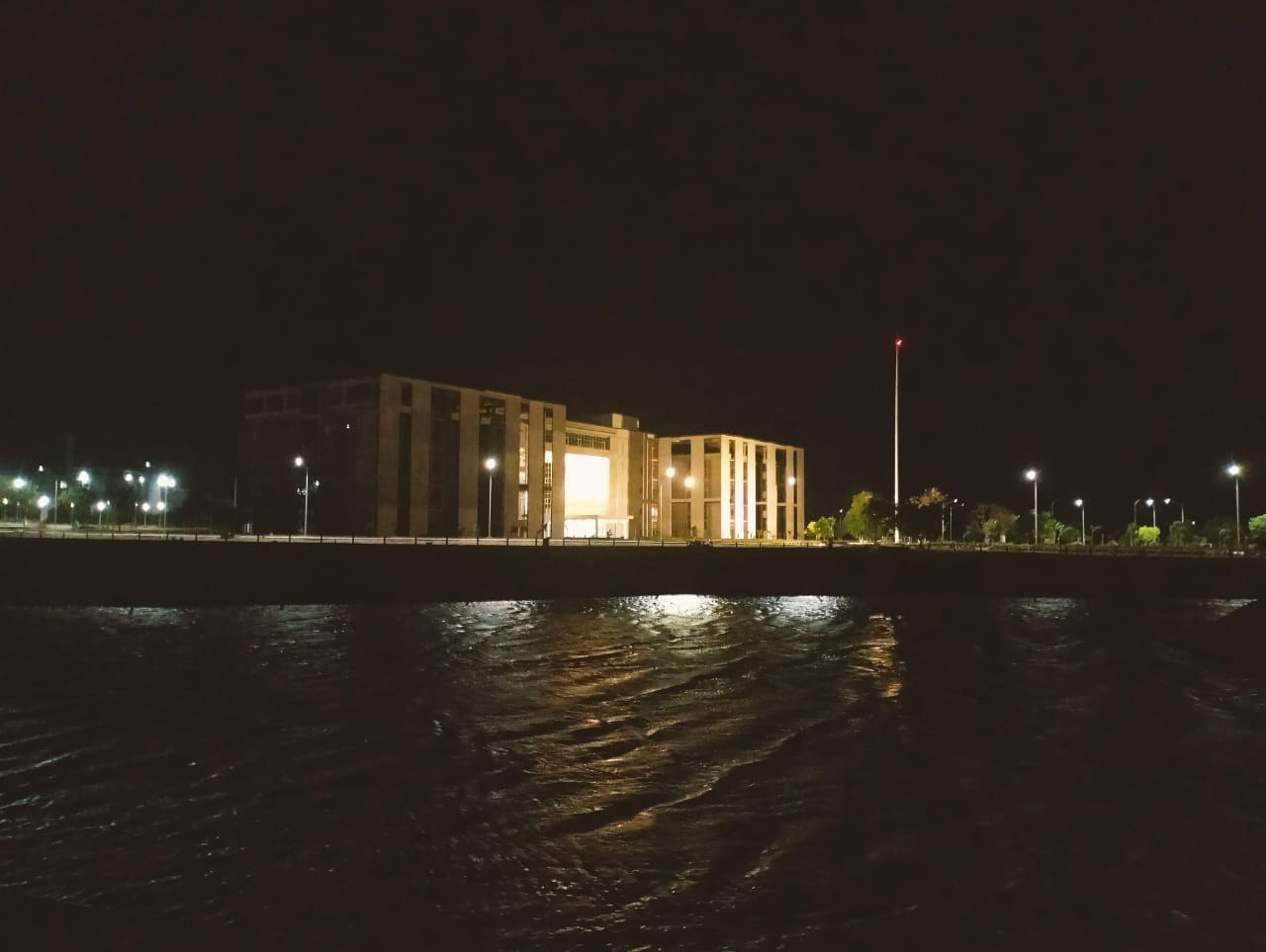
Administration Building, IITT

The Director of IIT Madras, Dr. Bhaskar Ramamurthi has been the Mentor Director of IITT since 2016. In 2017, K.N. Satyanarayana was appointed as director for IIT Tirupati. He was re-elected as the director for a second term since 2022.

The institute is planning to construct an 18 acres research park on the campus, which will soon be the largest institute research park in India, overtaking the IIT Madras research park which has a size of 13 acres. IIT Tirupati is the IIT to have the highest gender and faculty-to-student ratio among all the IITs.

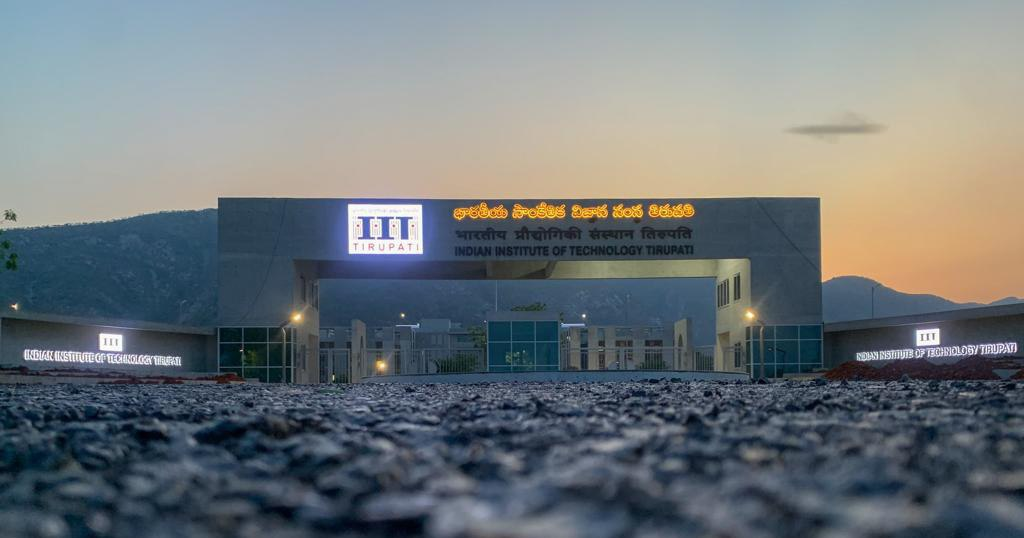
Main Gate, IITT

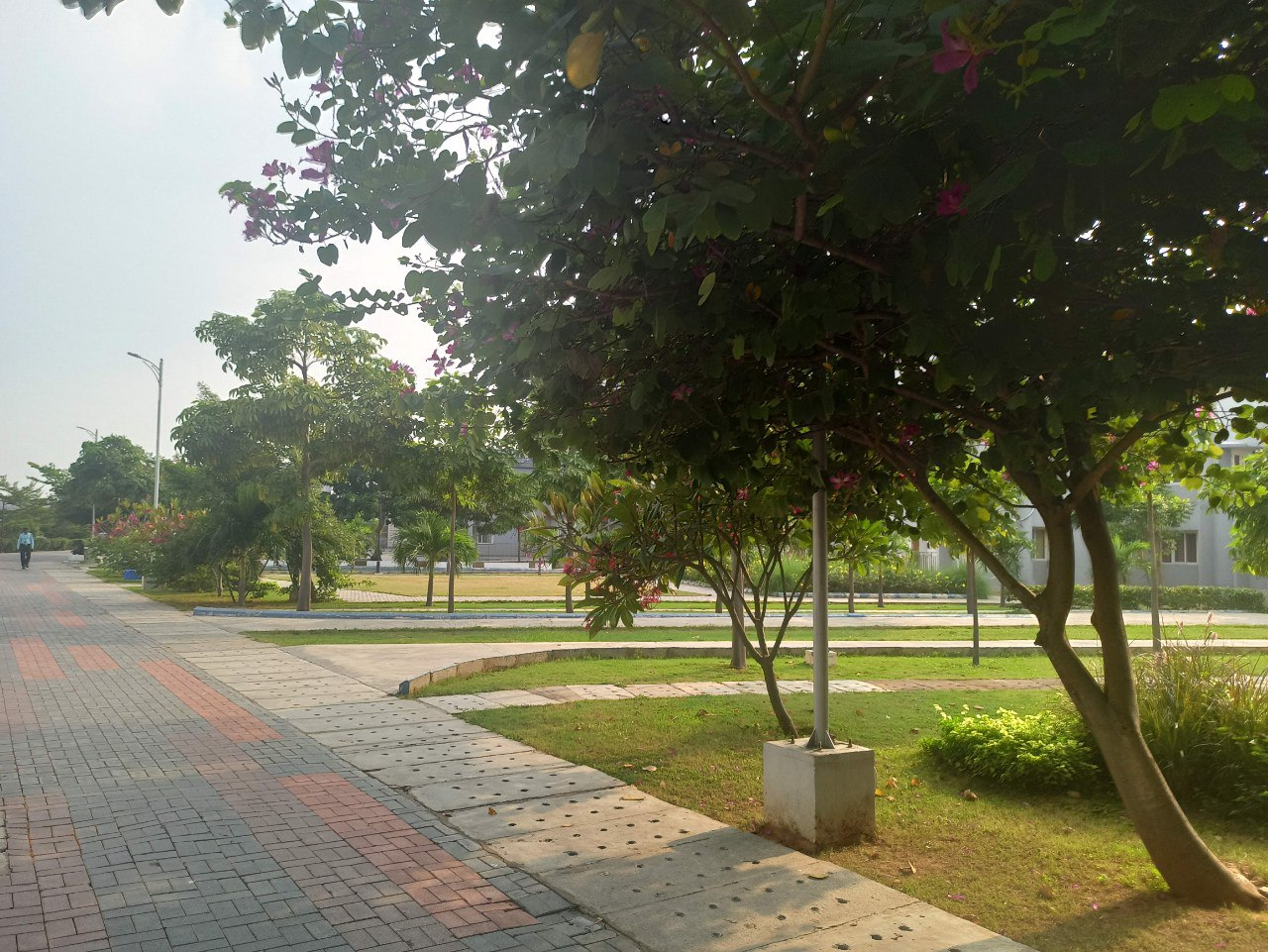
South campus, IITT.

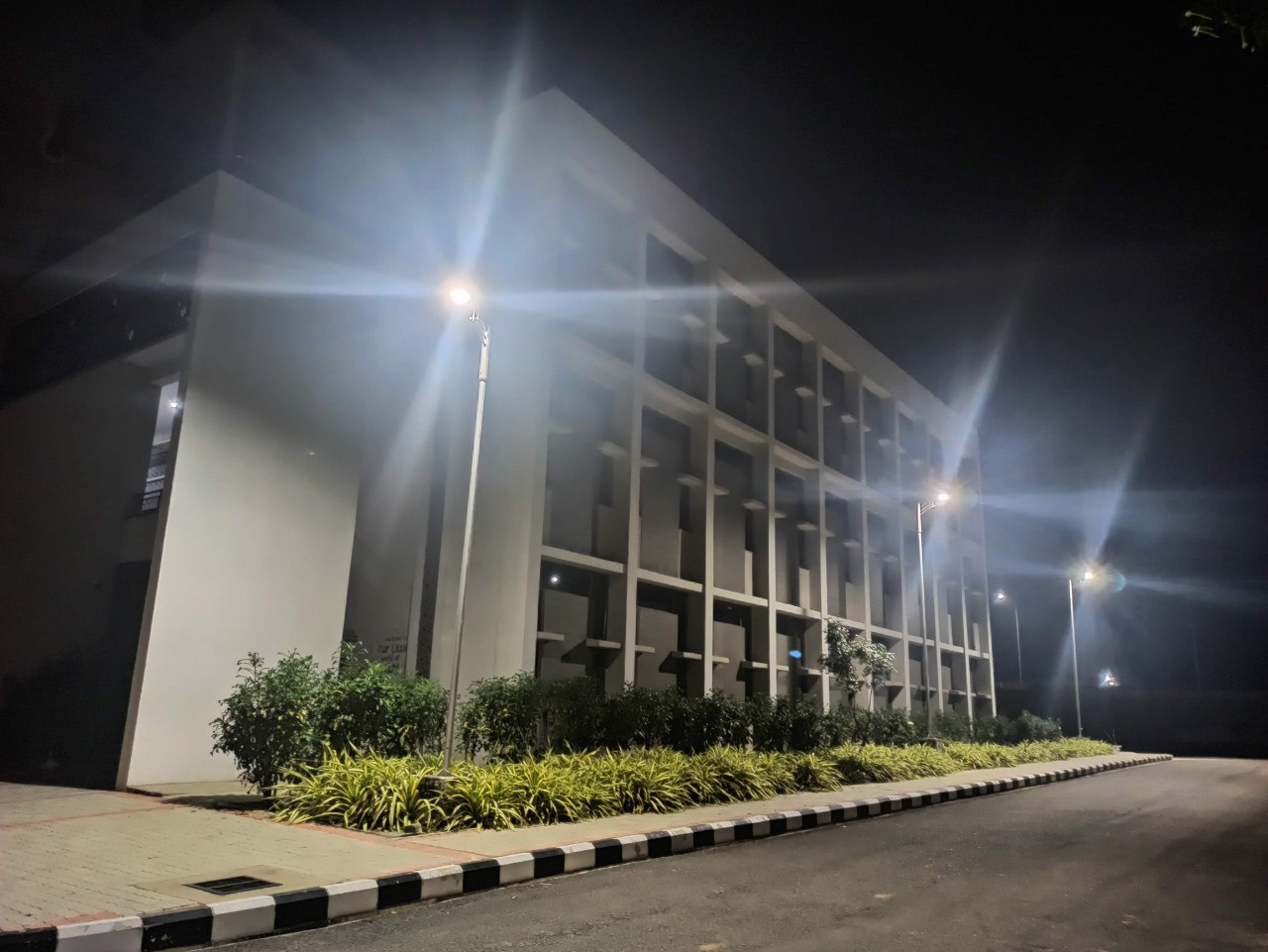
Classroom Complex (CRC)

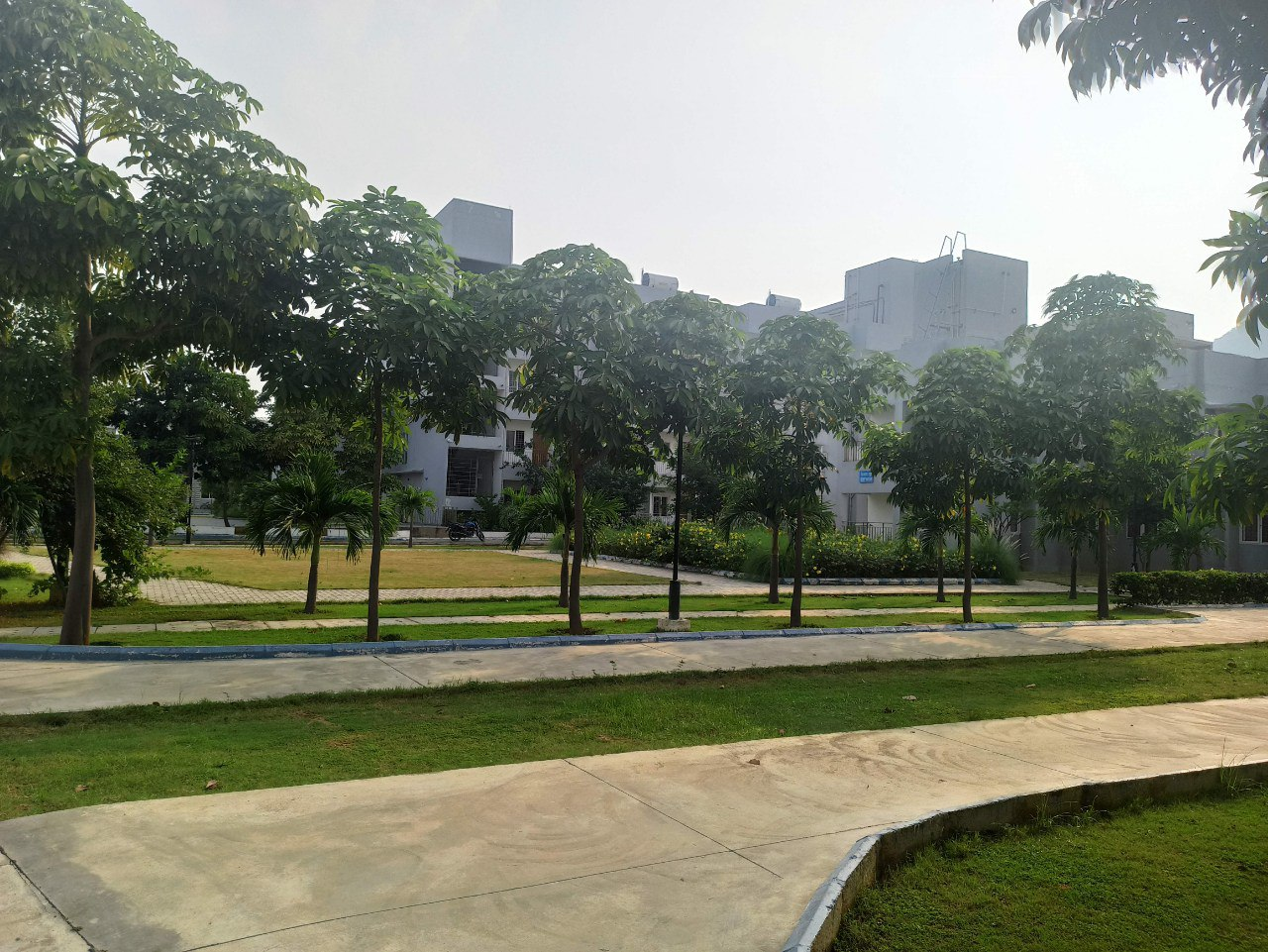
IIT Tirupati Transit campus.

== Campus ==
In the logo, the three 'people' depicted are inspired by a scene from traditional Indian spaces of learning called Gurukul in which Guru and Shishya are conversing about something which is of something paramount significance. The eyes stand for Pragya or institution as a form of ultimate wisdom.

The college started functioning on 5 August 2015 in a temporary campus housed at Krishna Theja Educational Institutions in Chadalawada Nagar. IIT Tirupati initially functioned out of the campus of Chadalawada Group of Institutes in Tirupati, while the permanent building is coming up near Yerpedu located between Renigunta and Srikalahasti.

The hostel facility for boys and girls is ready at the Transit Campus (50 acres), Yerpedu, which is a part of the permanent campus, and is also known as the South Campus. The permanent campus is under construction and the transit campus has been already constructed which consists of the Classroom Complex, Hostel block, Open Air Theatre, Computer Labs, Engineering Workshops for all trades, Library, a 500-seater mess, Play Ground, Indoor stadium, and a health center.

The campus also has a grocery store, a 24/7 cafeteria, and a new combined Mess-Canteen building on the North campus.

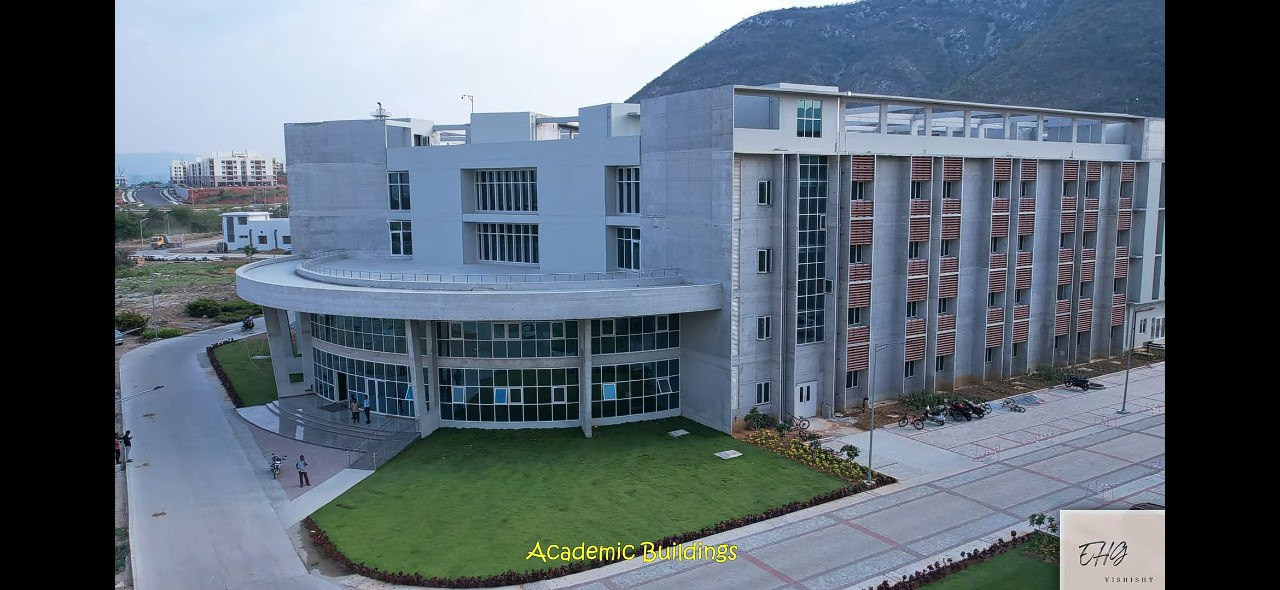
Academic Building 1 (CSE and Electrical)

Currently, the Stage 1C project of the campus construction is on the verge of completion, in the North campus. In this stage, the buildings constructed in the academic zone include two department buildings with offices for about 100 faculty members and about 50 laboratories, a Central Instrumentation Facility (CIF), a lecture hall complex (LHC) and an Administrative building. In the hostel zone, two hostels with 500 rooms each, a central dining facility, and sports facilities are ready. The residential zone includes the Director's bungalow that has already been occupied,168 apartments for faculty and staff, and a 20-room guest house. Two lakes spanning over 10 acres of land have been created on the campus to store water. In recognition of the sustainable construction, health and safety practices adopted at the site, the construction projects have received several awards, including the GRIHA Council Award for an exemplary demonstration of Sustainable Building Materials/Technologies, HUDCO Award for sustainable construction, International Safety Award Merit 2021 from the British Safety Council, RoSPA Gold Award 2020 from the Royal Society for the Prevention of Accidents, and the Trophy and Scroll for the category Construction Health, Safety & Environment presented at the 12th CIDC Viswakarma Awards, 2021.

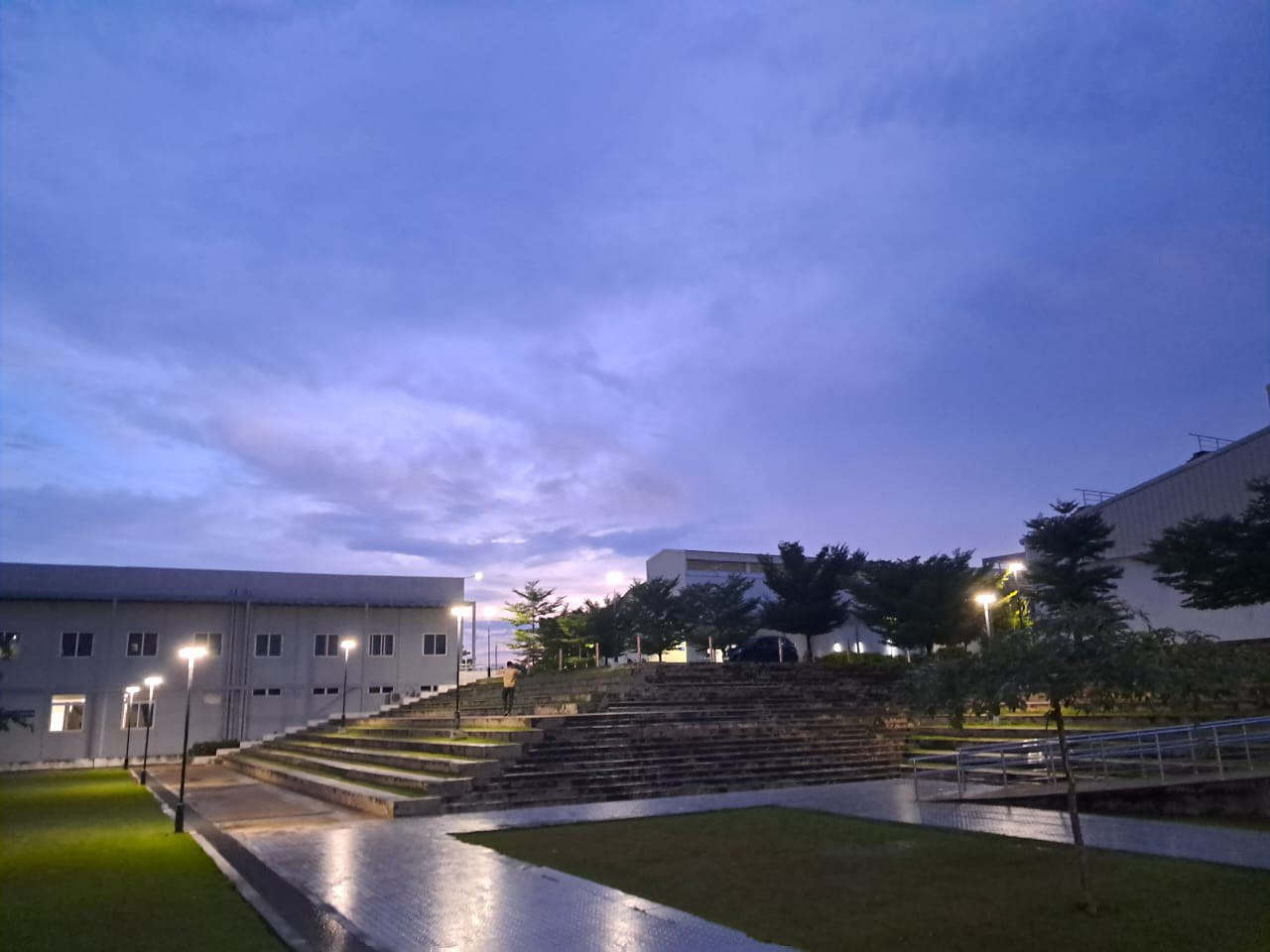
OAT, South Campus

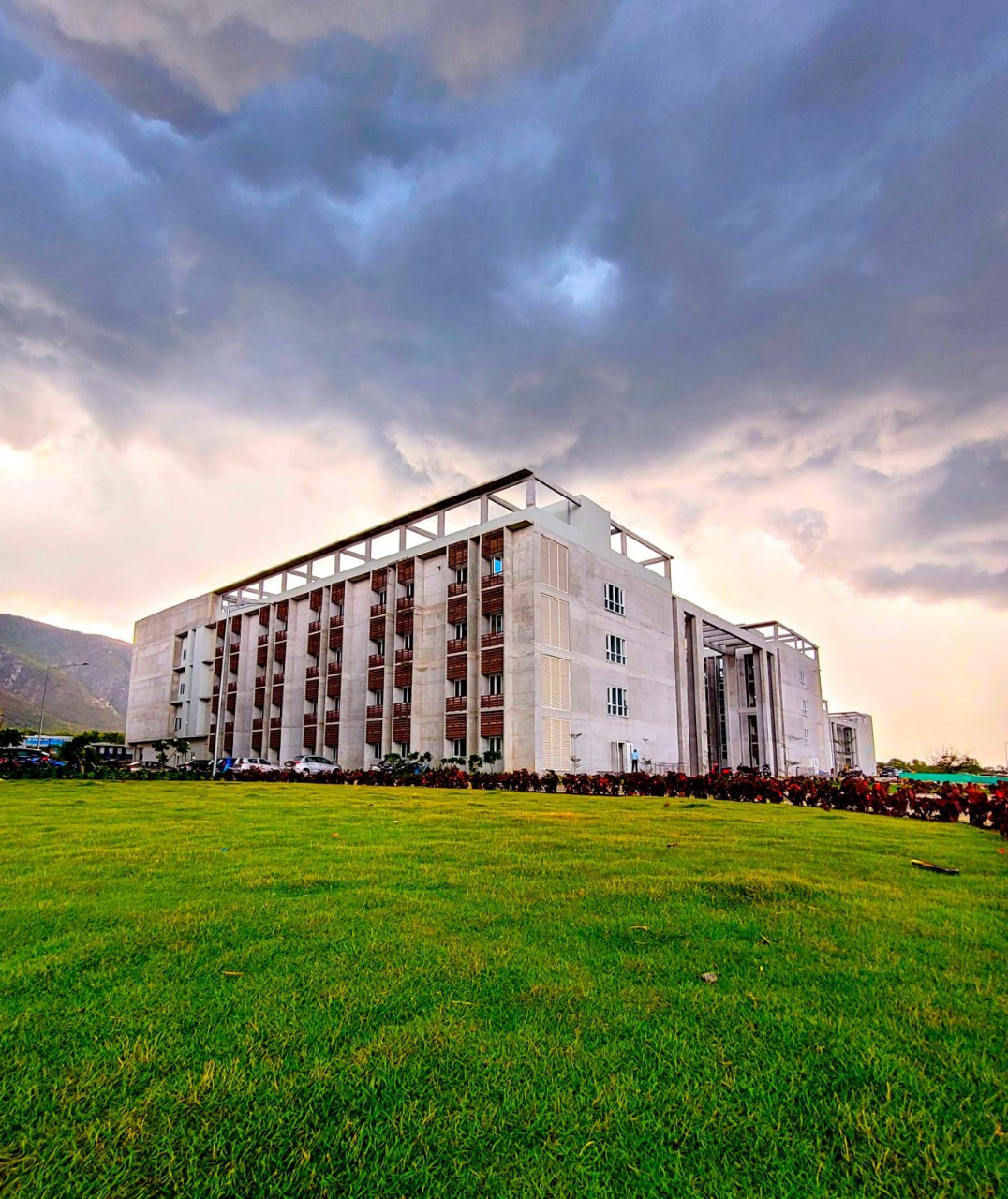
Academic Building 2 (Chemical and Chemistry)

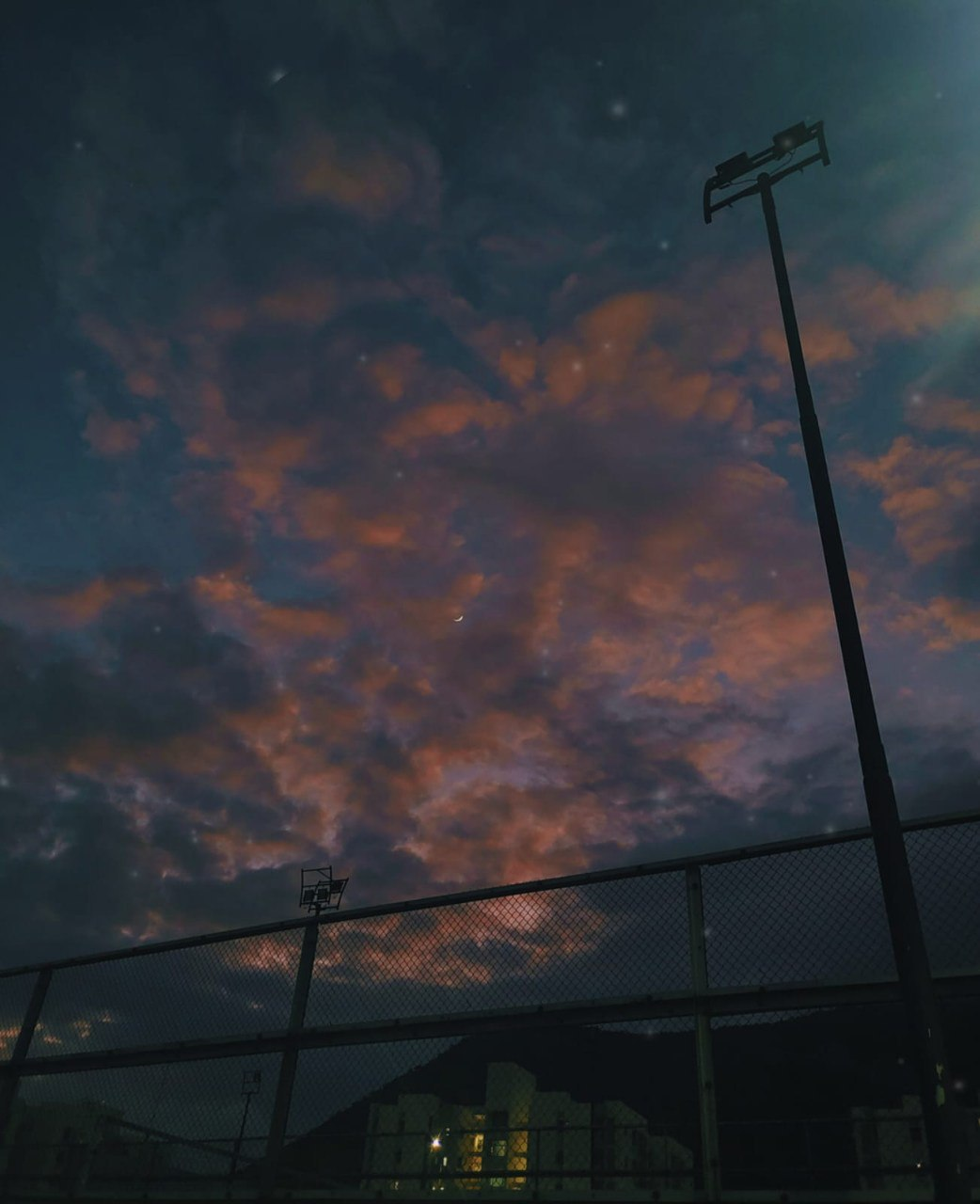
The Volleyball and Basketball courts, IITT

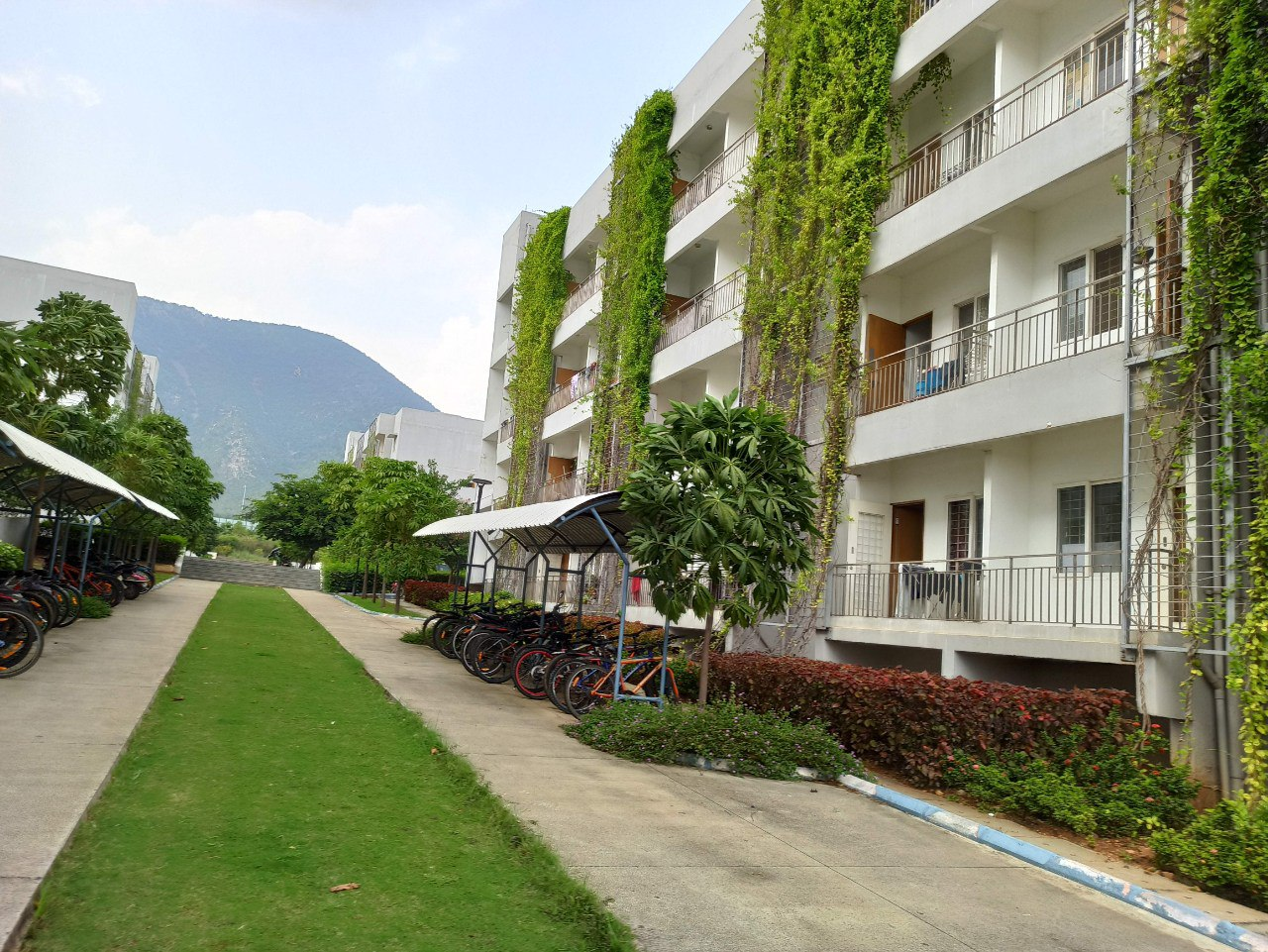
Hostels at IITT Transit campus.

== Academics ==
IIT Tirupati offers a 4-year Bachelor of Technology (B.Tech) along with 2-years Master of Science (M. Sc) Master of Science (M.S.), Master of Technology (M.Tech - started in 2018), Master of Public Policy (MPP) & Doctor of Philosophy (Ph.D.) programmes in several engineering, science and humanities fields. The academics of IIT Tirupati have been divided in two parts i.e. curriculum and courses. Admission to the B.Tech programme is through the Indian Institute of Technology Joint Entrance Examination (IIT-JEE-Advanced) and students are admitted after completing 10+2 schooling. Admission to the M.Tech/MSc/Ph.D programmes is through Graduate Aptitude Test in Engineering (GATE) - for M.Tech/Ph.D, Joint Admission Test for MSc (JAM).

The institute also has a strong collaboration with IISER, Tirupati, to activity conduct and promote research. They have collaborated and started CAMOST (Center for Atomic, Molecular, and Optical Sciences & Technologies) to promote activities. The students at IIT Tirupati can also take courses at IISER Tirupati and transfer credits during their undergraduate coursework.

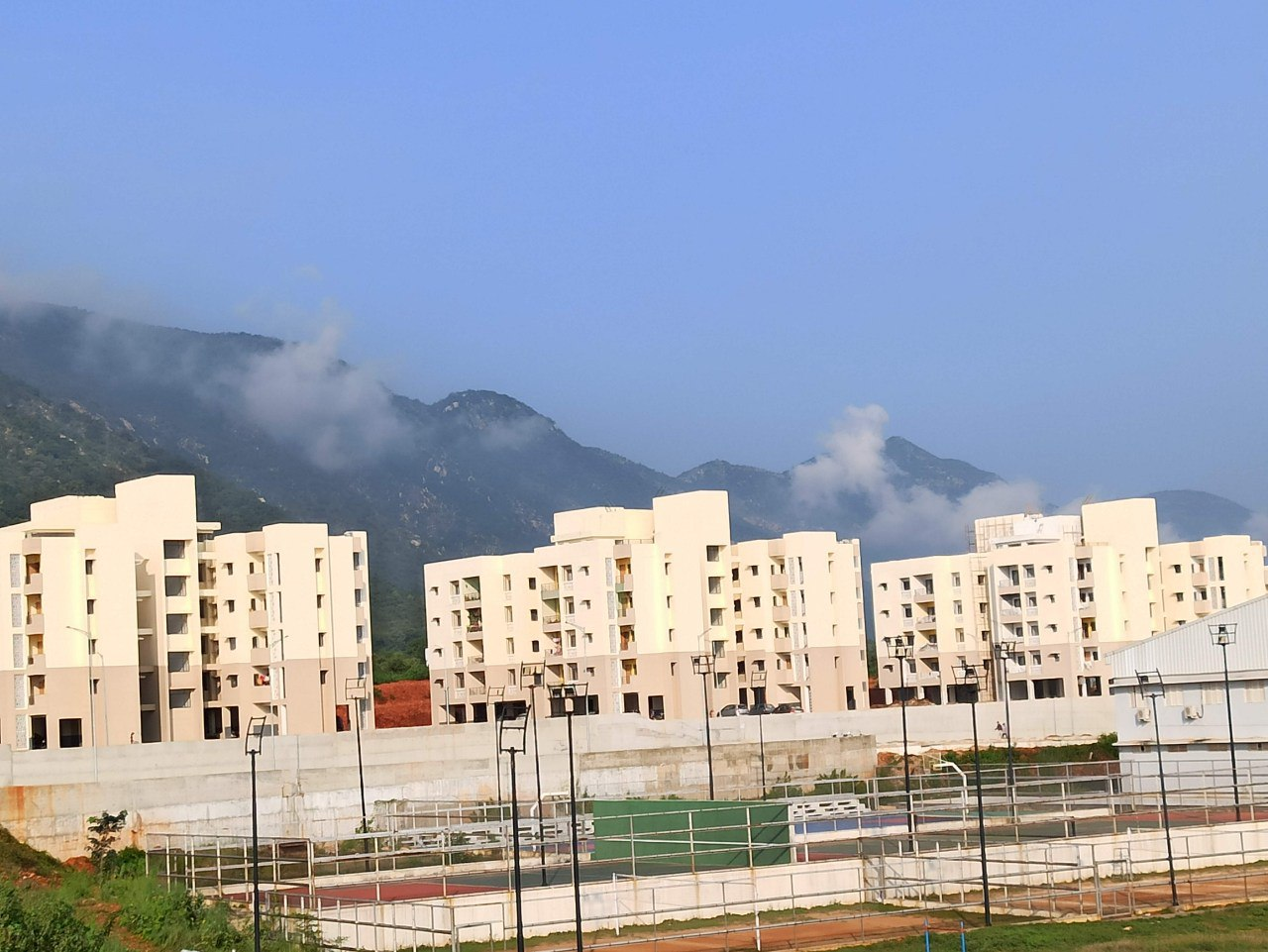
Faculty towers.

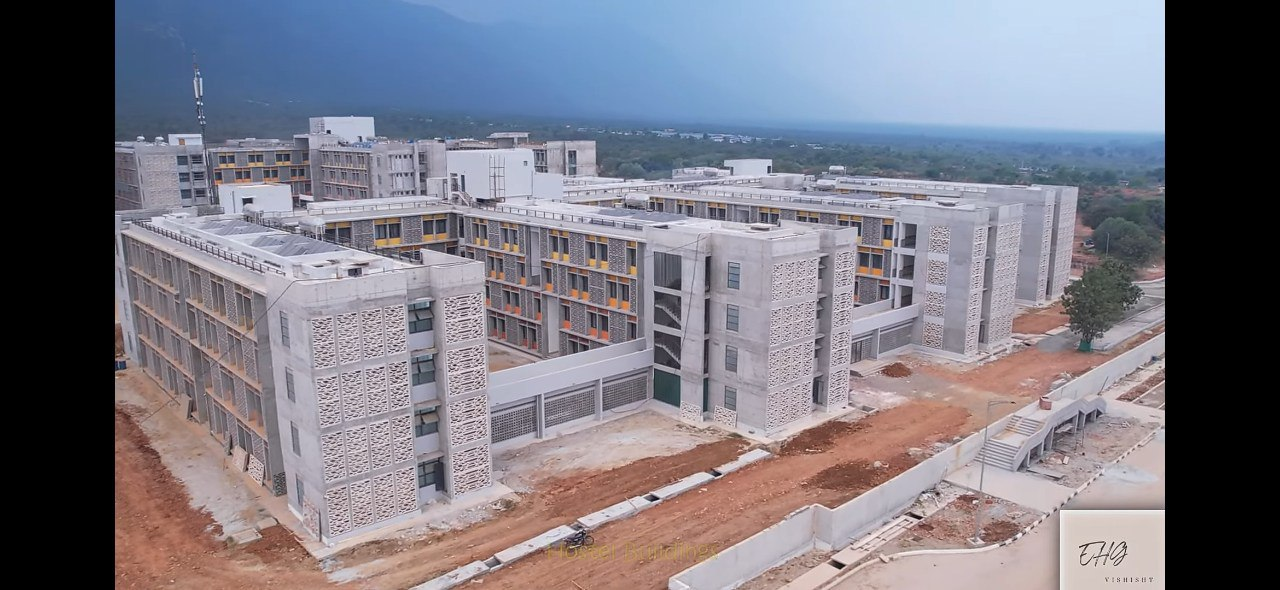
Malhar Hostels (G Block)

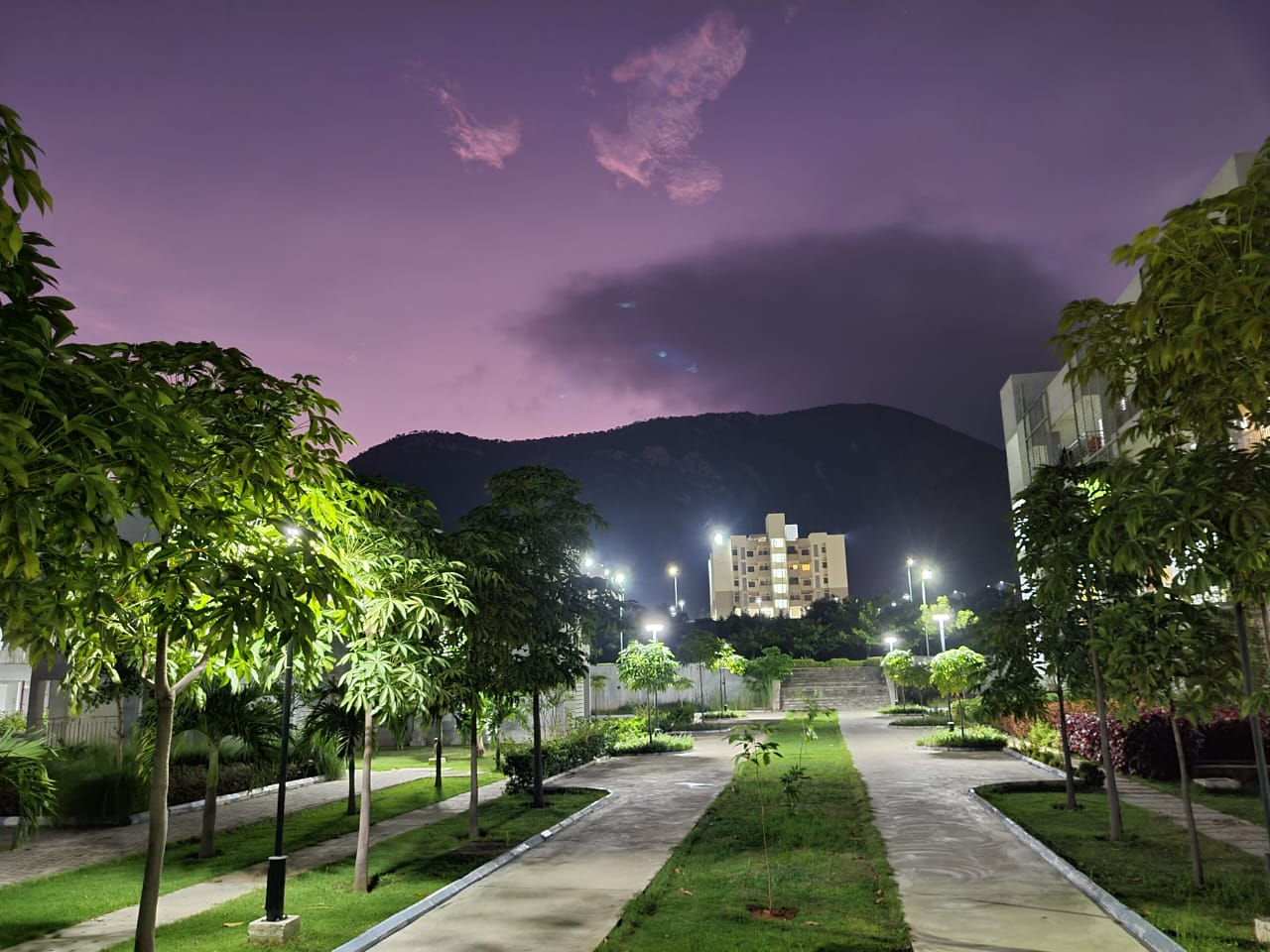
The Hills backdrop

The institute offers BTech courses in 6 departments, namely; .

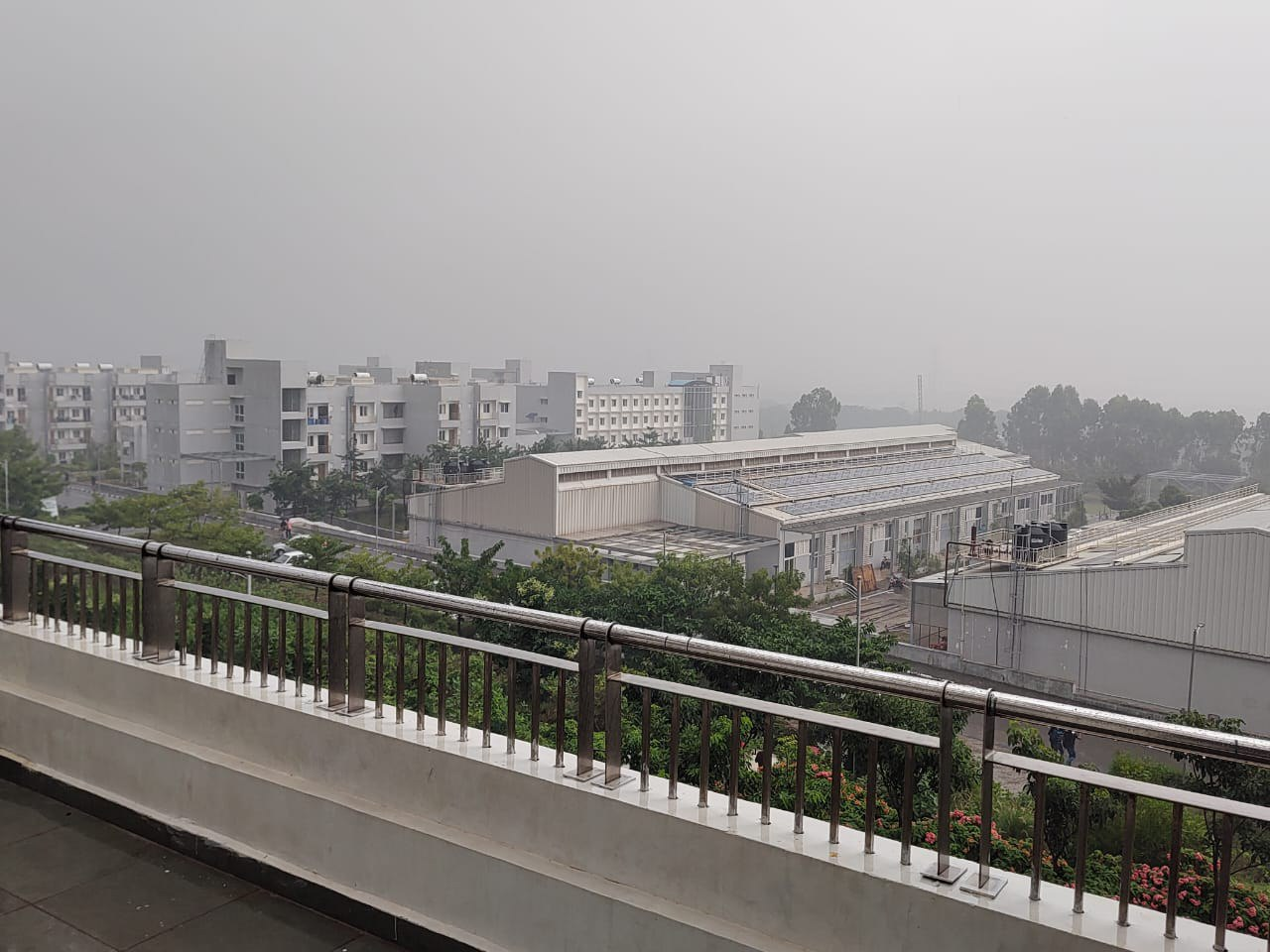
Labs, IITT South campus

- Chemical Engineering
- Civil Engineering
- Computer Science and Engineering
- Electrical Engineering
- Mechanical Engineering
- Engineering Physics

The institute is now planning to start at School of Design and a Materials Science department soon. The masterplan for the campus is to accommodate 12,000 students by 2040, and the college is currently in the Phase 2 of the construction process.

The Institute commenced its operations with a total of 106 students in four B.Tech. programmes (Civil, Computer Science & Engineering, Electrical & Mechanical) in 2015. M.Tech programs in Computer Science, Electrical and Mechanical Engineering, and B.Tech in Chemical Engineering were launched in 2018. Gradually, the Institute expanded its strength and introduced a master's programme in Mathematics and Statistics and M. Tech in three streams of Civil Engineering in 2019. The Master's programmes in Chemistry and Physics were launched in 2020. The current student strength of about 1250 includes 823 B. Tech students, 134 M. Tech students, 84 M. Sc students, 41 MS and 168 PhD research students. It has been often pointed out that IITs have a skewed gender ratio. However, IIT Tirupati boasts of 21.87% of girl students admitted to the B. Tech programmes and overall of 20.5% girl students enrolled in various programmes at the Institute. Catering to the needs of economically marginal groups, the Institute offers scholarships for students hailing from low-income families. With the objective of working closely with the Indian armed forces, the Indian army has sponsored nine officers for the M.Tech programs in Electrical and Mechanical Engineering in 2020.

=== Ranking ===
University rankings

Engineering – India
- NIRF (2022): 56
- NIRF (2023): 59
- NIRF (2024): 61

IIT Tirupati is ranked 57th among the engineering colleges of India by National Institutional Ranking Framework (NIRF) in 2025.

== Infrastructure Development ==
The Institute started its operations in 2015 at a temporary campus located on the Tirupati-Renigunta Road within the premises of Chadalawada Ramanamma Engineering College. Simultaneously, the foundation stone was laid at the 548-acre tract of land allocated by the Government of Andhra Pradesh near Yerpedu village to facilitate the establishment of a permanent campus for the Institute. The campus is being developed in multiple stages. A master plan was prepared to build a campus to cater to 12,000 students, while conserving its ecological features. The architects for the project include M/s Suresh Goel and Associates, Delhi and M/s ADPL, Delhi. The construction projects are being implemented through CPWD. The contractor for the Stage 1C project is M/s JMC Projects Ltd. The Third-Party Quality Assurance is being provided by CUBE, IIT Madras. The Stage 1A campus consisting of laboratories, hostels, classrooms and sports facilities was completed by 2018 by using prefab and sustainable technologies. The final year students from the first batch moved to Yerpedu campus in 2018. Subsequently, the Stage 1B project consisting of a hostel building, a classroom complex building and an engineering unit building were completed by the end of 2019. The stage 1A and 1B construction occurred near the south gate of the campus and is called 'Transit Campus' or 'South Campus'. The contract for the Stage 1C project was awarded on 20 March 2020, however Covid-19 pandemic, delayed the start of work till the first week of June 2020. The Stage 1C or 'North Campus' of the permanent campus completed in December 2023 and all operations shifted there from January 2024. The academic zone of North Campus consists of the academic blocks AB-1 and AB-2. These house faculty offices, research and teaching laboratories and classrooms. Additionally, a Central Instrumentation Facility, a Lecture Hall Complex and Administrative Building was built. In the hostel zone, two hostels with 1,000 rooms, a Central Dining facility, a food court was built. The residential zone consists of 152 apartments for faculty and staff, a 20 room guest house and Director's Bungalow. The external services for power, water, wastewater handling and roads were also constructed as a part of this package. Two lakes over 10 acres are created to harvest the rain water.

== Student Co-curricular and Extra-Curricular Activities ==
Apart from their academic rigor, students at the Institute are active in the overall development of their personalities. Students engage with their peers in social service, club activities, cultural programmes, an annual festival, etc. Some of them include:

=== Tirutsava: Cultural Fest ===
Tirutsava, the annual cultural festival of IIT Tirupati organized by the students in February each year, is witness to a motley of cultural and technical events. Coding challenges, think tanks, debates, quizzes, and cultural activities give the students a chance to identify their creative and analytic sides. It also includes standup comedy, skits, dramas etc.

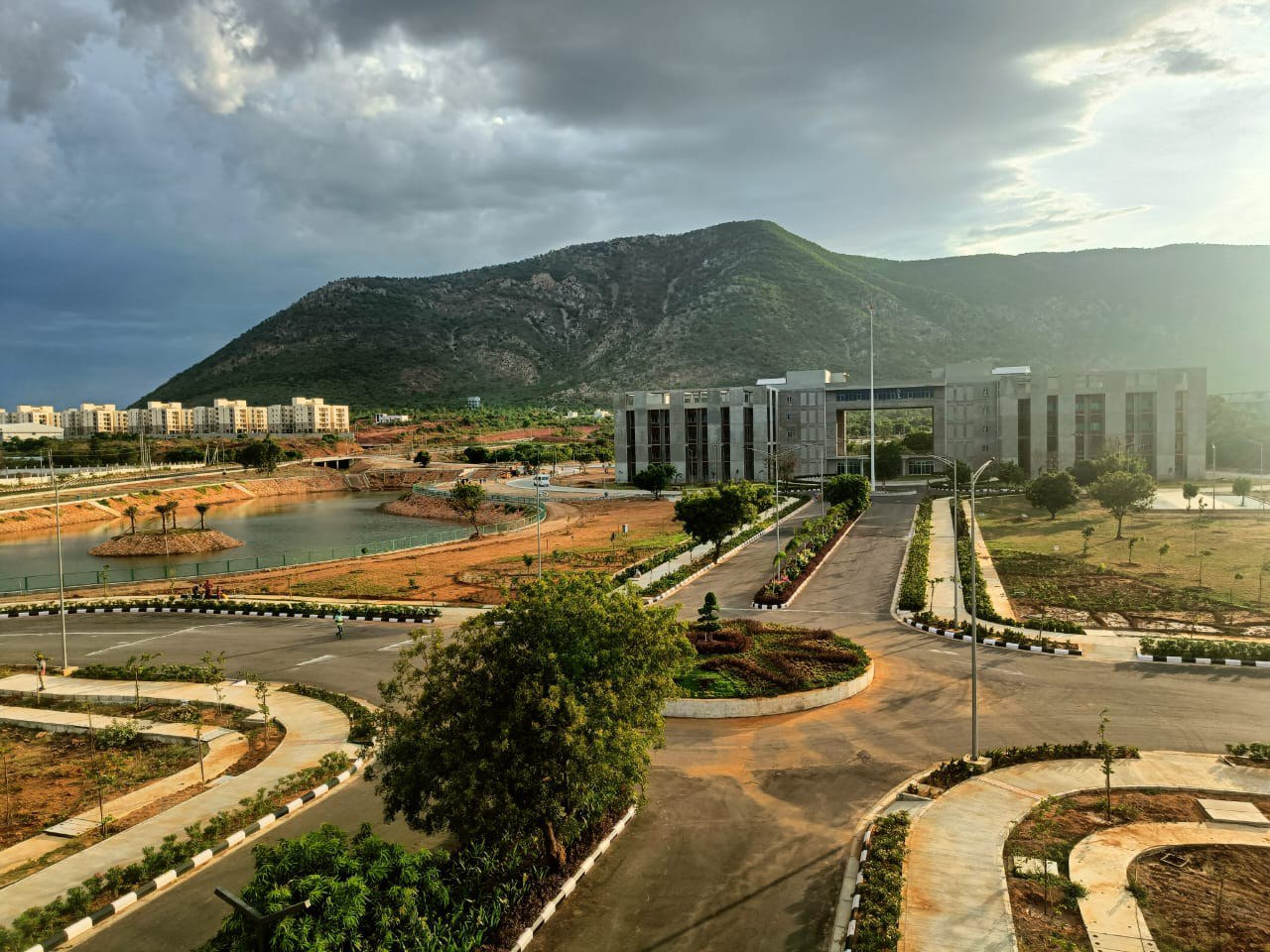
Main Entrance, North Campus

=== SPIC MACAY ===
SPIC MACAY chapter at IIT Tirupati has been very active, with the aim to promote Indian classical music and dance among the youth. In August 2019 IIT Tirupati hosted the Virasat series consisting of a number of art workshops and music performances by renowned artists.

== Clubs and Sports Activities ==
IIT Tirupati has about 14 active clubs and societies under which they organize various extramural activities, like Sigma Squad(AI | ML), Techmaniacs (Robotics), Digital Wizards (Coding), PFC(Photography and Films Club), Chaturanga (Chess), Xcite (Dance) etc. With the increasing number of students, club activities became more diversified. Various clubs play a crucial role in getting the participants ready for Inter-IIT cultural, technical and sports events. Under the Fit India Movement, the Institute launched its Fitness Club to organize yoga classes and informative webinars on the theme of the club. Sarathi, the Guidance and Counseling Unit is catered to the mental well-being of students by conducting counselling sessions, orientation programmes, yoga classes and life-skill sessions.

== Departments ==
=== Department of Chemical Engineering ===
The Department of Chemical Engineering, instituted in 2018, offers both undergraduate and postgraduate programmes. The undergraduate curriculum attempts to achieve a balance between fundamental courses and industry-oriented design courses. This helps students to appreciate each course's relevance and relate its concepts to application in the process industry. At the postgraduate level, the department currently offers MS (by research) and Ph.D. programmes. The faculty members in the department are actively engaged in various research areas such as Food Technology, Colloids and Interfaces, Nanomaterials, Advanced Separations, Catalysis, Microfluidics and Corrosion Engineering and Machine Learning for Process Systems.

=== Department of Civil and Environmental Engineering ===
The Department of Civil and Environmental Engineering is one of the first four departments that were set up in 2015 with the Institute. The department offers numerous courses at the undergraduate level to introduce students to academic research and themes relevant to the civil engineering industry. Most of the courses are structured in a problem-solving or a design-based approach, which are currently the industry's key demands. Undergraduate research is encouraged by the Institute by providing B.Tech. students the option of working on research projects with their faculty as a part of their curriculum. In addition to M.S. and Ph.D programmes, the department offers M. Tech programme in specializations such as environmental & water resources engineering, structural engineering, and transportation and infrastructure engineering. M.Tech. in geotechnical engineering commenced from August 2020 along with Dual Degree programmes in the aforementioned streams.

=== Department of Computer Science ===
The Department of Computer Science and Engineering at IIT Tirupati, established in 2015, offers B. Tech., M.Tech., M.S., and Ph.D. The undergraduate degree offered by the department gives ample importance to fundamentals and state-of-the-art technologies by offering courses such as Machine Learning, Deep Learning, Artificial Intelligence, etc. The faculty members of the department, whose interests cover a wide range of fields in Computer Science (broadly in the verticals of Systems, Theory and Data Science), constantly work towards providing better education while working at premier levels in their respective fields like Algorithmic Engineering, Big Data Technologies, Cloud Computing, Delay Tolerant Networks, Internet of Things, Machine Learning, Software Engineering, etc. Courses in the curriculum cover basics and advanced levels and have been planned to nurture innovation, ethics, and societal interaction. Each programme follows a rigorous and diversified course curriculum emphasizing fundamentals, project-driven, and industry-relevant courses. The M.Tech. programme in CSE focuses on Data Science and Systems. The department is actively engaged in research in the areas of algorithms, machine learning, reinforcement learning, computer networks, software engineering, parallel computing, computer organization and architecture, theoretical computer science, and mathematical modelling.

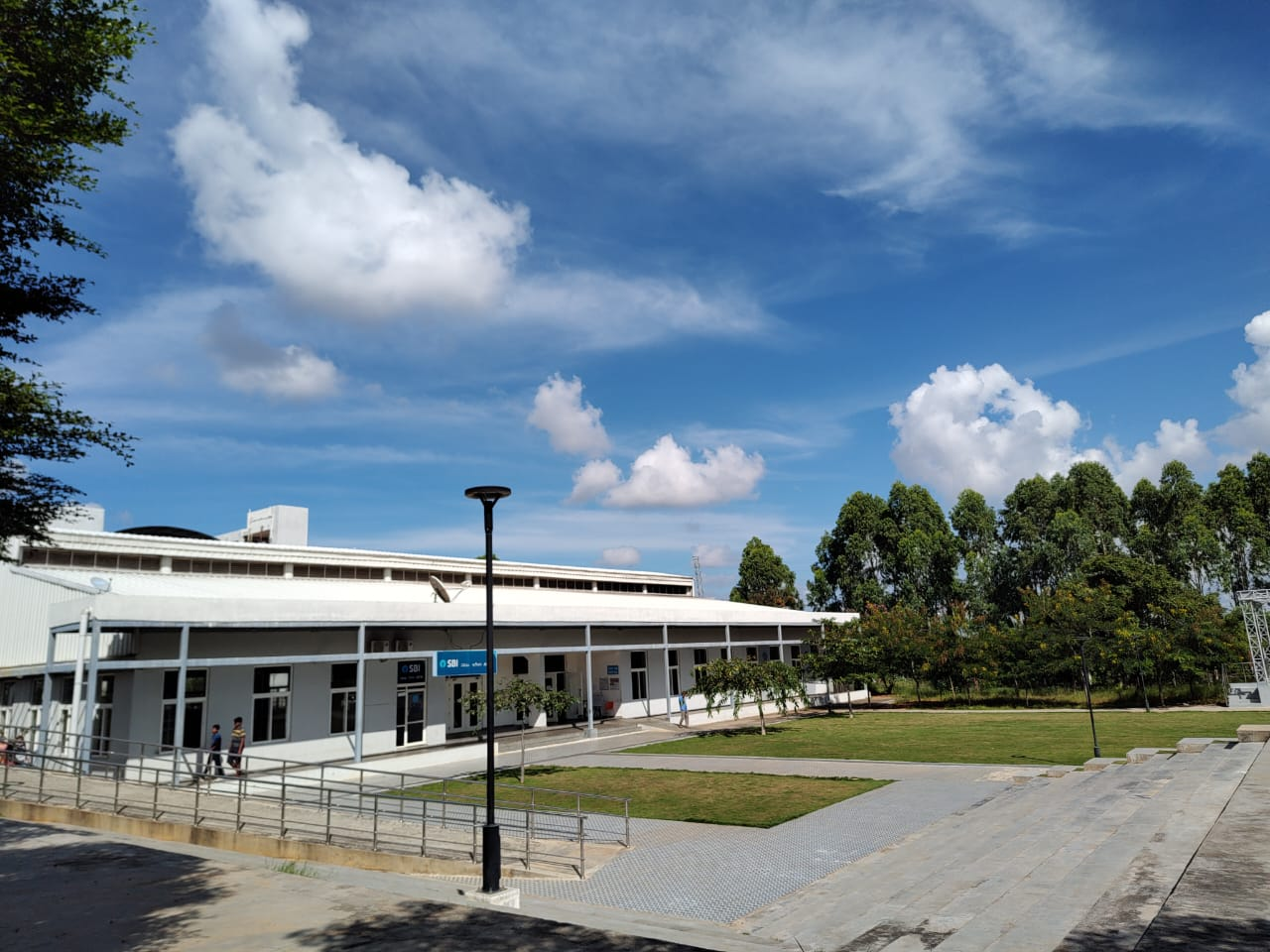
Dining hall, South Campus

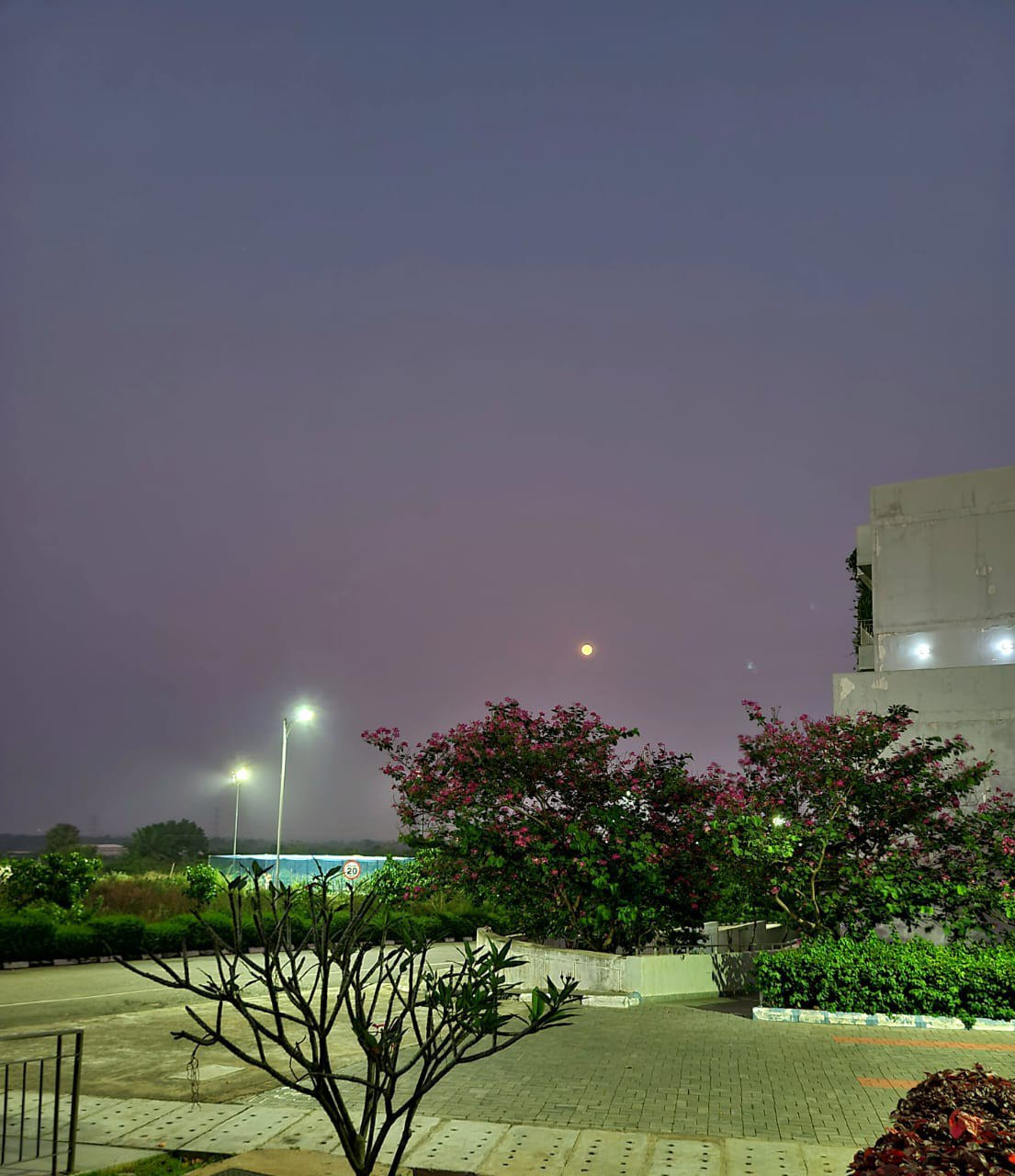
Inside the Hostel Block, South campus

=== Department of Electrical Engineering ===
The Department of Electrical Engineering at IIT Tirupati, established in 2015, offers B. Tech., M. Tech., M.S. and Ph.D. programmes. The department is actively involved in research in the areas of signal processing, machine learning, medical imaging, nanoelectronics, device modelling, semiconductor devices, digital design and cyber security, power electronics, power systems and smart grids, industrial automation, robust & optimal control, electronic instrumentation, physical layer secrecy, performance analysis of networked systems and distributed algorithms on networks. The department offers a two-year M.Tech. programme in signal processing & communication. The programme consists of theoretical courses in advanced topics in signal processing and communication along with practical laboratory sessions. The department has a signal processing and communication laboratory.

=== Department of Mechanical Engineering ===
The Department of Mechanical Engineering, established in 2015, offers B.Tech., M.Tech. (in Design and Manufacturing), and PhD programmes. The department offers undergraduate courses titled 'Engineering Drawing' and 'Engineering Mechanics' to all the engineering disciplines of IIT Tirupati. The department is active in research in the areas of applied solid mechanics, dynamics, thermal and fluid engineering, materials research, and manufacturing engineering. The faculty members of the department are engaged in research in the areas of solid mechanics and design, thermal and fluid engineering, and manufacturing engineering and materials research. Also, a wide range of advanced courses are offered in line with the current research topics relevant to the department and interdisciplinary research.

=== Department of Mathematics and Statistics ===
The Department of Mathematics and Statistics at IIT Tirupati started in 2015. The department offers mathematical, statistical and computing courses for all engineering disciplines of IIT Tirupati at undergraduate, postgraduate and research levels. The department specialises in the areas of pure and applied mathematics, industrial mathematics & statistics, machine learning and data science. The faculty members of the department are engaged in various research areas of mathematics and statistics, including Representation Theory, Analytic Number Theory, Fractals, Fixed Point Theory, Partial Differential Equations, Numerical Analysis, Inverse Problems, Industrial Mathematics, Mathematical Modelling, Generalized Linear Models, Machine Learning, Statistical Signal Processing, Statistical Finance, and Environmental Statistics. The department currently offers M.Sc. (Mathematics and Statistics) and Ph.D. programmes.

=== Department of Physics ===
The Department of Physics offers a 4 year B.Tech Engineering Physics program, 2 year M.Sc. Physics program and a Physics Ph.D. program. Current active research areas within the department include Atomic, Molecular, Optical physics, Condensed Matter Physics, High Energy Phenomenology, Astroparticle physics, Quantum Technologies. The department has 4 research and 5 teaching laboratories.

=== Department of Humanities and Social Sciences ===
The Department of Humanities and Social Sciences at IIT Tirupati, established in 2015, offers a two-year postgraduate course titled Master of Public Policy as well as PhD in various disciplines. Furthermore, the department also offers elective courses in the areas of Economics, English, Philosophy, Finance, Organizational Behaviour and Operations Management for all engineering disciplines in undergraduate programmes. The department also offers compulsory courses in the area of English and Professional Ethics. In addition, proficiency courses in foreign languages such as Spanish, German, Sanskrit, and Japanese are offered to students in the first year of their B.Tech. programme. The department is active in research areas of social and political philosophy, contemporary Indian thought, development economics, climate change economics, environmental economics, natural resource management, behavioural economics, Indian theories of language and literature, conflict literature, empirical asset pricing, financial engineering and risk management, organizational leadership, sustainable HRM, decent work and work engagement, operations management, industrial engineering, operations research and supply chain management.

== International Relations ==
The institute, being a 3rd generation IIT has signed MoUs with various universities in India and abroad. IITT is a partner university in the Shastri Indo-Canadian Institute network, and the Mitacs partner network, which includes various Canadian institutes. The college recently signed an MoU with the Dalhousie University for student and faculty exchange, research collaboration, and other academic purposes. IITT is also a member of the Indo-European Heritage network which also includes various European universities like KTH Royal Institute of Technology, École centrale de Nantes, University of Geneva etc. and a group of other Indian institutes too including IIT Bombay, IIT Kanpur, IIT Delhi etc.

== CAMOST (IISER-IIT Tirupati Joint Collaboration) ==
Drawing on the faculty at IIT Tirupati and IISER Tirupati, a joint 'Center for Atomic, Molecular, Optical Sciences Technologies (CAMOST)' was established. This was inaugurated on 14 August 2020 by Dr. Arbinda Mitra, Scientific Secretary in the o/o Principal Scientific Adviser to the Govt. of India. The Centre is envisioned to serve as a nodal hub for several ongoing and upcoming scientific National Missions related to Interdisciplinary Cyber Physical Systems (ICPS), Artificial Intelligence (AI), Quantum Technology Applications (QTA), and the Supercomputing Mission (SCM). Prof. P. C. Deshmukh is the mentor and current convenor of CAMOST.

== See also ==
- IIT Bombay
- IIT Delhi
- IIT Kharagpur
- IIT (BHU) Varanasi
- IIT Madras
