= Indian Institute of Science Education and Research, Tirupati =

Higher education institution in India

- Motto: Creating infinite possibilities
- Type: Public university
- Established: 28 March 2015; 11 years ago
- Budget: ₹96.49 crore (US$10 million) (FY2023–24 est.)
- Chairperson: Jhillu Singh Yadav
- Director: Santanu Bhattacharya
- Academic staff: 79 (2025)
- Students: 1,069 (2025)
- Undergraduates: 795 (2025)
- Doctoral students: 274 (2025)
- Location: Tirupati, Andhra Pradesh, India; 13.7467202°N 79.5953447°E
- Campus: Urban 250 acres (1.0 km^{2})
- Acronym: IISER Tirupati
- Website: www.iisertirupati.ac.in

Indian Institute of Science Education and Research, Tirupati commonly referred as IISER Tirupati, is an autonomous public university in Tirupati, Andhra Pradesh, India. It has been established by the Ministry of Human Resource Development, now the Ministry of Education.

IISER Tirupati started functioning in the 2015-2016 academic year, with the new batch arriving in the month of August. IISER Pune mentored this institute till the new director was appointed.

== History ==
The institute was allocated to state of Andhra Pradesh as part of the AP bifurcation bill. The foundation stone of IISER Tirupati was laid on 28 March 2015 by the Union human resources minister, Smriti Irani & Chief Minister of Andhra Pradesh, N. Chandrababu Naidu.

Initially, the institute had started functioning from a transit campus in the Sree Rama Educational Society, Tirupati. The Andhra Pradesh government has allocated a piece of land of over 250 acres for the permanent campus in Yerpedu. Ground breaking ceremony of IISER Tirupati Main Campus building at Janaganapalli, Yerpedu Mandal, Tirupati District was done on 1 October 2020 and the construction was started. The permanent campus was constructed and has been operating there since 2024. In 2026, IISER Tirupati announced that it would work with the Canadian Dalhousie University and IIT Tirupati to build the Tirupati Tri-Institutional Global Innovation Campus.

== Academic programs ==
- BS-MS Programme: IISER Tirupati offers Integrated Master's level (B.S.-M.S.) course. The BS-MS programme is for a duration of five years who have passed (10+2) level. Admission to this program is after 10+2 years of school training and is currently done in co-ordination with the other IISERs, IISc Bangalore and IIT Madras through the IISER Aptitude Test. Both JEE Advanced and KVPY were earlier modes of admission, which is now discontinued. Four years BS in Economics and Statistical Science will be offered from August 2025.
- PhD Programme: The PhD programme at IISER Tirupati was initiated in August 2017. It involves a combination of coursework, teaching assistantship along with a major research component. IISER Tirupati admits students to its doctoral programme in Physics, Mathematics, Biology, Chemistry, Earth & Climate Sciences, and associated inter-disciplinary areas of research. Mode of entry is through National level tests such as GATE, CSIR-UGC NET, JEST, JGEEBILS.
- Integrated PhD Programme: The integrated PhD (i-PhD) programme at IISER Tirupati was initiated in August 2018. It is aimed at highly motivated students who wish to pursue a career in scientific research. Mode of entry is through National level tests such as Joint Admission Test for Masters (JAM), NBHM, JEST, JGEEBILS.

== Facilities ==
IISER TIRUPATI has the following facilities: a gym with high end work out equipment, TV room, student activity room, canteen, a library with a variety of books, computer lab, an outdoor as well as indoor basketball court, cricket ground, football ground, badminton court (both outdoor and indoor), squash court, table tennis room, and chess room.

== Clubs ==
The college apart from its academics has different clubs looking into different matters. The clubs are usually led by teachers and the tasks are undertaken by students. The different clubs are - Prakriti club, Creative Filming club, Movie club, Sports club, PaCODEah the Tech Club,Shemushi or the quiz club, Bio-wissen club, Math club, Literary club Physics club, Chemistry club, Math club, Fovea photography club and CELESTIC (official Astronomy club).

== See also ==
- Indian Institutes of Science Education and Research
- IISER Pune
