= K.N. Satyanarayana =

Indian professor and administrator

Director at Indian Institute of Technology Tirupati
- Incumbent
- Assumed office January 2017–present

Professor at Indian Institute of Technology Madras
- In office 1991–2016

Personal details
- Education: Indian Institute of Technology Madras; Clemson University
- Profession: Professor; Consultant
- Known for: Construction management and Quality Management
- Website: iittp.ac.in/dr-k-n-satyanarayana

Kalidindi N. Satyanarayana is the Director of Indian Institute of Technology Tirupati. He is known for his pioneering studies on Building Technology and Construction Management. He also holds the chairmanship of the Academic Advisory Group, Project Management Institute (PMI) India.

== Awards and honors ==
- PMI (India) Distinguished Scholar Award (2011)
- The Suchit Kumar Ghosh Memorial Medal (2002) from Institution of Engineers (India)
- Chi Epsilon Award

== Selected bibliography ==
- Loganathan, Santhosh; Srinath, Purushothaman; Kumaraswamy, Mohan; Kalidindi, Satyanarayana; Varghese, Koshy (2017). "Identifying and Addressing Critical Issues in the Indian Construction Industry: Perspectives of Large Building Construction Clients". Journal of Construction in Developing Countries. 22 (suppl. 1): 121–144. doi:10.21315/jcdc2017.22.supp1.7. hdl:2436/621791.
- Roy, Debopam; Kalidindi, Satyanarayana N.; Menon, Arun (2019). "An Exploratory Study on Project Delivery Frameworks for Heritage Conservation in India". Structural Analysis of Historical Constructions. RILEM Bookseries. Vol. 18. Springer International Publishing. pp. 1998–2006. doi:10.1007/978-3-319-99441-3_214. ISBN 978-3-319-99440-6. S2CID 169634810.
- Doloi, Hemanta K.; Loganathan, Santhosh; Kalidindi, Satyanarayana N.; Mahalingam, Ashwin (24 May 2016). "Assessment of Stakeholders' Management Practice in Infrastructure Projects—An Indian Case Project". Construction Research Congress 2016. American Society of Civil Engineers. pp. 1465–1474. doi:10.1061/9780784479827.147. ISBN 9780784479827.
- Devkar, Ganesh A.; Kalidindi, Satyanarayana N. (5 July 2013). "Modeling and assessment of competencies in urban local bodies for implementing PPP projects". Built Environment Project and Asset Management. 3 (1): 42–57. doi:10.1108/BEPAM-07-2012-0041.
- Thomas, A. V.; Kalidindi, Satyanarayana N.; Ganesh, L. S. (April 2006). "Modelling and assessment of critical risks in BOT road projects". Construction Management and Economics. 24 (4): 407–424. doi:10.1080/01446190500435275. S2CID 17131198.
