= Joint Entrance Screening Test =

Entrance test for PhD admissions in India

- Acronym: JEST
- Type: Paper-based test
- Administrator: Science and Engineering Research Board
- Skills tested: Academic knowledge
- Purpose: Admission to PhD and Integrated PhD
- Duration: 3 hours
- Score range: 100
- Score validity: 2 years
- Offered: Once a year
- Regions: India
- Languages: English
- Prerequisites: M.Sc, B.Sc, ME, M.Tech, BE, B.Tech, MCA
- Fee: ₹800 (general) ₹400 (reservation)
- Used by: 33 institutes
- Website: www.jest.org.in

The Joint Entrance Screening Test (JEST) is a national entrance test in physics and theoretical computer science conducted annually in India. The test is utilised by various Indian public research institutes to shortlist candidates for admission to PhD and Integrated PhD programmes with fellowships in theoretical computer science and areas in physics. JEST has been recognised as a National Eligibility Test (NET) by the Science and Engineering Research Board (SERB).

As of 2024, there are a total of 33 participating institutes in JEST. Each year, the test is conducted by any one of the institutes as a common test for admission to all participating institutes. A PhD in theoretical computer science is provided only at the Institute of Mathematical Sciences.

== Qualification ==
Ideally, the candidates should hold a Master of Science (MSc) degree in physics from a recognized institute or university. Additionally, certain institutions also accept candidates with a background in Bachelor of Engineering (BE), Bachelor of Technology (BTech), Master of Engineering (ME), or Master of Technology (MTech) in any disciplines of applied physics and mathematics. Some intitutes also consider candidates with a Bachelor of Science (BSc) and Master of Computer Application (MCA), while others accept graduates in electronics, optoelectronics, and astronomy.

JEST is conducted as a paper-based test. There is a fee of ₹800 for general candidates and ₹400 for reserved candidates. The syllabus will be at the level of MSc in physics or computer science. The test is held at centres around the country. Over 33 science institutes participate in the test. There are two core papers—physics and theoretical computer science; candidates can opt for any one. Each year, the test is conducted by any one of the participating institute. There is no age limitation or restriction on number of attempts to write the exam. However, joining institutes may have age restrictions. Some institutes also insist on a high cut-off mark. The JEST score is valid for one year.

Passing the JEST exam does not guarantee an automatic fellowship. Candidates are required to submit separate applications to PhD programmes in their desired institution, as and when advertised. Shortlisted applicants, based on their JEST scores, may undergo an interview as part of their selection process. Each institute has its own set of research topics, eligibility criteria, and selection processes. Fellowships are granted by the respective institutes.

== Participating institutes ==
Currently, there are a total of 33 premium public research institutes participating in JEST, as of 2023.

- Aryabhatta Research Institute of Observational Sciences (ARIES)
- Bose Institute
- Harish-Chandra Research Institute (HRI)
- Homi Bhabha National Institute (HBNI)
- Indian Institute of Astrophysics (IIA)
- Indian Institute of Science (IISc)
- Indian Institute of Science Education and Research, Berhampur (IISER Berhampur)
- Indian Institute of Science Education and Research, Bhopal (IISER Bhopal)
- Indian Institute of Science Education and Research, Kolkata (IISER Kolkata)
- Indian Institute of Science Education and Research, Mohali (IISER Mohali)
- Indian Institute of Science Education and Research, Pune (IISER Pune)
- Indian Institute of Science Education and Research, Thiruvananthapuram (IISER Thiruvananthapuram)
- Indian Institute of Science Education and Research, Tirupati (IISER Tirupati)
- Indian Institute of Space Science and Technology (IIST)
- Indira Gandhi Centre for Atomic Research (IGCAR)
- Institute of Mathematical Sciences, Chennai (IMSc)
- International Centre for Theoretical Sciences (ICTS)
- Institute of Physics, Bhubaneswar (IOP)
- Institute for Plasma Research (IPR)
- Inter-University Centre for Astronomy and Astrophysics (IUCAA)
- Jawaharlal Nehru Centre for Advanced Scientific Research (JNCASR)
- National Brain Research Centre (NBRC)
- National Centre for Radio Astrophysics (NCRA-TIFR)
- National Institute of Science Education and Research, Bhubaneswar (NISER)
- Physical Research Laboratory (PRL)
- Raja Ramanna Centre for Advanced Technology (RRCAT)
- Raman Research Institute (RRI)
- Saha Institute of Nuclear Physics (SINP)
- S. N. Bose National Centre for Basic Sciences (SNBNCBS)
- Tata Institute of Fundamental Research (TIFR)
- TIFR Centre for Interdisciplinary Sciences (TIFR-TCIS)
- UGC-DAE Consortium for Scientific Research (UGC-DAE CSR)
- Variable Energy Cyclotron Centre (VECC)

== Research subjects ==
Programmes include PhD, integrated MSc–PhD and M.Tech–PhD in physics, theoretical computer science, neuroscience, and computational biology. Some of the research subjects for PhD, Integrated PhD, and MSc are:

- Astronomy and astrophysics
- Atmospheric science
- Computational biology
- Condensed matter physics
- High energy physics
- Neuroscience
- Plasma research
- Quantum optics
- Quantum information
- Theoretical computer science
