= National Eligibility Test =

Indian Entrance Exam

The National Eligibility Test (NET) is a standardised test conducted at the national level by various agencies of the Ministry of Education, Government of India. It assesses candidates' eligibility for research fellowships, specifically the Junior Research Fellowship (JRF), Lectureship (LS, or Assistant Professor category) and, in some cases, the Senior Research Fellowship (SRF). Being one of the hardest and competitive tests, the Junior Research Fellowship (JRF) is widely considered a prestigious and coveted fellowship in India, with an almost 0.7% success rate, and a 6-7% success rate for the Assistant Professor category. The UGC–NET National Eligibility Test is in the list of the top 10 toughest exams in India. The UGC NET (National Eligibility Test) has two papers: Paper 1, which is common for all candidates, and Paper 2, which is subject-specific. Paper 1 assesses teaching and research aptitude, reasoning, comprehension, communication, and general awareness. Paper 2 evaluates knowledge in the candidate's chosen subject from a list of 83 subjects.

Paper 1 (Common for All):

- Teaching Aptitude
- Research Aptitude
- Reading Comprehension
- Communication
- Reasoning (including Mathematical)
- Logical Reasoning
- Data Interpretation
- Information and Communication Technology (ICT)
- People and Environment
- Higher Education System

Paper 2 (Subject Specific): There are 83 subjects to choose from, including:

- Economics, History, Political Science, Psychology, Sociology
- Commerce, Management, Law, Education, Computer Science
- English, Hindi, Sanskrit, and many more
- Subjects related to Arts, Performing Arts, Fine Arts, and Languages
- Subjects related to Sciences (e.g., Chemical Sciences, Earth, Atmospheric, Ocean and Planetary Sciences, Life Sciences, Mathematical Sciences, and Physical Sciences; conducted and fellowships are funded dually with the Council of Scientific and Industrial Research, commonly known as CSIR-UGC NET exam.)
- Subjects related to Social Sciences (e.g., Anthropology, Criminology, etc.)
- Subjects related to Library and Information Science, Mass Communication, etc.

A complete list of subjects and their codes can be found on the UGC NET website. When choosing your subject for Paper 2, it is recommended to select the subject you specialized in during your postgraduate studies.The test enables successful candidates to pursue doctoral programmes and contribute to research endeavors within public research institutes and universities across the country.

Additionally, many colleges and universities use the NET as a criterion for appointing assistant professors, with a lower cut-off mark specified than that required for the JRF.

== List of NET exams ==
The NET exams include but not limited to:

- Agricultural Scientists Recruitment Board–National Eligibility Test (ASRB–NET)
- Graduate Aptitude Test in Engineering (GATE)
- Graduate Pharmacy Aptitude Test (GPAT)
- UGC–NET
- CSIR–UGC NET
- Indian Council of Medical Research–Junior Research Fellowship (ICMR–JRF)
- Indian Council of Agricultural Research–All India Competitive Examination (ICAR–AICE)
- Joint Admission Test for Masters (JAM)
- Joint Entrance Screening Test (JEST)
- Joint Graduate Entrance Examination for Biology and Interdisciplinary Life Sciences (JGEEBILS)
- NBHM PhD Scholarship Screening Test
