= Research fellowships in India =

After completing a postgraduate degree, one of the options is to pursue a Doctor of Philosophy (Ph.D) program. These Ph.D programs cost money and time. To help a scholar there are many Research Fellowship Schemes in India funded by either a government agency or a private one. Such a scholar pursuing a Ph.D receives a monthly stipend and in some cases an annual contingency grant for 2 to 5 years.

The most relevant of these are:

1. Prime Minister’s Research Fellowship (PMRF)
2. Jawaharlal Nehru Memorial Fund Scholarship
3. Physical Research Laboratory Junior Research Fellowship
4. Google PhD Fellowship India Program
5. ICHR Junior Research Fellowship (JRF)
6. ICSSR Doctoral Research Fellowship
7. Maulana Azad National Fellowship (MANF) (discontinued from fiscal year 2023)
8. NCERT Doctoral Fellowship for PhD
9. Junior Research Fellowship
10. CSIR-UGC JRF NET Fellowship
11. AICTE Doctoral fellowship (ADF)
12. DBT-JRF Fellowship
13. FITM – AYUSH Research Fellowship Scheme
14. SAARC Agricultural PhD Scholarship
15. Swami Vivekananda Single Child Scholarship for Research in Social Science
16. ESSO-NCESS Junior Research Fellowship

== Prime Minister’s Research Fellowship (PMRF) ==
This fellowship was launched by the Ministry of Human Resource Development under the supervision of the Central Government of India in the budget 2018-2019. This scholarship scheme provides financial support to the meritorious students of IISc, IISERs and IITs taking admission in a Ph.D programme. Under this scheme, the scholar gets a monthly stipend of ₹70,000 for first-year which is increased to ₹80,000 per month during 4th and 5th year of the program. During the course of the fellowship, researchers are also eligible to a research contingency grant of ₹2 lakh per annum.

== Jawaharlal Nehru Memorial Fund Scholarship ==
Jawaharlal Nehru Memorial Fund Scholarships is another Ph.D scholarship available to Indian and students of Asian countries. The selected candidates are paid ₹18,000 every month to support their tuition fees. Contingency grand of ₹15,000 is also paid to these researchers annually.

== Physical Research Laboratory Junior Research Fellowship ==
It is one of the top PhD scholarships in India for postgraduates in the field of physics and astronomy. It is exclusively for PhD research at Physical Research Laboratory (PRL) and provides monthly awards up to ₹35,000 per month.

== Google PhD Fellowship India Program ==
This fellowship program is offered by Google for Ph.D scholars in computer science. The Google Ph.D Fellowship India Program also provides a monthly fellowship amount and a contingency expenses. Moreover the scholars are also provided an internship offer at Google.

== ICHR Junior Research Fellowship ==
ICHR Junior Research Fellowship (JRF) are for PhD aspirants of historical studies and are offered by the Indian Council of Historical Research. It offers monthly stipend of ₹17,600 and contingency expenses of ₹16,500 for 2 years.

== ICSSR Doctoral Research Fellowship ==
It is a doctoral fellowship given by Indian Council of Social Science Research of Government of India pursuing Ph.D in social sciences and is registered in a UGC recognized Indian university. The fellowship is ₹20,000 per month for only two years.

== Maulana Azad National Fellowship ==
This fellowship was provided by the Ministry of Minority Affairs of the Government of India. The fellowship was provided to students from minority communities whose family income is not more than 6 Lakh. Financial assistance of ₹28,000 per month for 5 years was given to pursue higher education such as MPhil and PhD. However, this scheme has been discontinued as, according to the Ministry of Minority Affairs, it overlaps with other fellowships schemes offered by Govt. of India such as JRF and CSIR fellowship. In February 2024, Ministry of Minority Affairs increased the fellowship amount at par with UGC norms with effect from January 2023.

== NCERT Doctoral Fellowship for Ph.D ==
This fellowship is given by NCERT to young scholars in any recognized university in India. The NET qualified NCERT doctoral fellows receives ₹25,000 per month for a maximum period of three years. For the candidates who have not qualified for the NET exam, the amount is only ₹23,000 per month.

== Junior Research Fellowship ==
The Junior Research Fellow (JRF) is a letter awarded by the various government agencies to the candidates who qualify in the a National Eligibility Test. JRF letter is a bearer document that signifies you can avail of the scholarship while pursuing Ph.D.

One of the most widely participated NET exams is the UGC–NET, for which there are two cut-off marks declared by UGC, one for passing the exam which qualifies a candidate for assistant professorship in universities and colleges and a higher cut-off for receiving JRF. The score of JRF is valid only for 3 years, whereas the score for assistant professorship is valid for the lifetime.

== CSIR-UGC JRF NET Fellowship ==
This is a fully-funded PhD scholarship offered by the Council of Scientific and Industrial Research (CSIR) for the field of Engineering, Mathematical Sciences, Life Sciences, Earth, Atmospheric, Ocean and Planetary Science, Chemical Sciences, amongst others. Similar to UGC JRF, the stipend of a JRF selected through CSIR- National Eligibility Test (NET) will be ₹37,000 per month for the first two years and ₹42,000 per month for the next three years. In addition, annual contingent grant of ₹20,000 is also provided.

== AICTE Doctoral fellowship (ADF) ==
ADF or AICTE Doctoral Fellowship, is a research promotion scheme launched by AICTE in 2020. It is the AICTE equivalent to junior research fellowships. The objectives of the ADF scheme are:

- To promote research culture in AICTE-approved Institutions.
- To promote collaborative research between Institute and Industries leading to start-ups.
- To nurture talents for technical research.

In 2020 and 2021 as per ADF Guidelines, a total of 339 fellowships were granted to 42 universities in India for the academic session 2020-–021 and 2021-–022. For the current academic year 2022-2023, fellowships were reduced to 310 across 35 universities in India. The university-wise number of fellowships is available in the ADF Scheme published annually during the month of July by AICTE.

=== Fellowship ===
The fellowship of ADF Fellows is ₹37,000 per month for the first two years followed by ₹42,000 per month for the third year. house rent allowance (HRA) is also provided to these scholars at the rate of 8%, 16% and 24% as per the Government of India (GoI) norms In addition, Contingency Grant of Rs.15, 000/- per annum is also given to ADF Fellows to meet their miscellaneous expenditures. Even in IIT's and NIT's the fellowship for doing Ph.D is same as UGC, which is Rs 37,000 per month. The highest fellowship for doing Ph.D in India is PMRF- Prime Ministers Research Fellowship.

=== List of Universities in India under ADF Scheme ===
1. Jawaharlal Nehru Technological University, Anantapur, Andhra Pradesh - 8 Fellowship
2. North Eastern Regional Institute of Science and Technology (Deemed to be University), Arunachal Pradesh - 8 Fellowship
3. Assam Science and Technology University, Guwahati, Assam - 5 Fellowship
4. Tezpur University, Tezpur, Assam - 11 Fellowship
5. Chhattisgarh Swami Vivekanand Technical University, Bhillai, Chhattisgarh - 10 Fellowship
6. Guru Ghasidas Vishwavidyalaya, Bilaspur (Chhatisgarh), Chhattisgarh - 8 Fellowship
7. Delhi Technological University, Delhi (Delhi), Delhi - 8 Fellowship
8. Guru Gobind Singh Indraprastha University, New Delhi, Delhi - 5 Fellowship
9. Indraprastha Institute of Information Technology, (IIIT) Delhi, Delhi - 8 Fellowship
10. Jamia Millia Islamia, Central University, New Delhi (Delhi), Delhi - 8 Fellowship
11. Jawaharlal Nehru University (JNU), New Delhi, Delhi - 8 Fellowship
12. Gujarat Technological University, Gujarat, Gujarat - 15 Fellowship
13. Guru Jambheshwar University of Science and Technology, Hisar, Haryana - 6 Fellowship
14. J. C. Bose University of Science and Technology (YMCA), Faridabad, Haryana - 7 Fellowship
15. Deenbandhu Chhotu Ram University of Science and Technology, Murthal, Haryana - 7 Fellowship
16. Jharkhand University of Technology, Ranchi, Jharkhand - 5 Fellowship
17. Visvesvaraya Technological University (VTU), Belagavi, Karnataka - 10 Fellowship
18. APJ Abdul Kalam Technological University, Thiruvananthapuram, Kerala - 10 Fellowship
19. Rajiv Gandhi Proudyogiki Vishwavidyalaya, Bhopal, Madhya Pradesh - 10 Fellowship
20. Mumbai University, Mumbai, Maharashtra - 6 Fellowship
21. Shivaji University, Kolhapur, Maharashtra - 9 Fellowship
22. Savitribai Phule Pune University, formerly University of Pune, Maharashtra - 8 Fellowship
23. Institute of Chemical Technology, Mumbai, Maharashtra - 11 Fellowship
24. Biju Patnaik University of Technology, Rourkela, Odisha - 10 Fellowship
25. Veer Surendra Sai University of Technology, Burla, Odisha - 8 Fellowship
26. Puducherry Technological University, Puducherry, Puducherry - 3 Fellowship
27. Maharaja Ranjit Singh Punjab Technical University, Bhatinda, Punjab - 5 Fellowship
28. Sant Longowal Institute of Engg and Technology (Deemed University), Punjab - 8 Fellowship
29. Anna University, Chennai, Tamil Nadu - 15 Fellowship
30. Jawaharlal Nehru Technological University, Hyderabad, Telangana - 10 Fellowship
31. University of Hyderabad, Hyderabad (Telangana), Telangana - 8 Fellowship
32. Tripura University (Central University), Tripura - 8 Fellowship
33. Dr. A. P.J. Abdul Kalam Technical University, Lucknow, Uttar Pradesh - 18 Fellowship
34. Maulana Abul Kalam Azad University of Technology, Kolkata, West Bengal - 10 Fellowship
35. Jadavpur University, Kolkata, West Bengal - 16 Fellowship

== DBT-JRF Fellowship ==
This Fellowship is offered by the Government of India for biotechnology scholars who clear the biotechnology eligibility test (BET). The fellowship amount of is ₹25,000 per month for the first two years and ₹28,000 for the last three years. In addition house rent allowance (HRA) is also given.

== FITM – AYUSH Research Fellowships Scheme ==
This fellowship is awarded to scholars of age 28 – 35 doing research in the field of AYUSH. Under this scheme, a doctoral fellowship for 2 years and a postdoctoral fellowship for 1 year is provided.

== SAARC Agricultural PhD Scholarship ==
This fellowship is provided by SAARC for pursuing a Ph.D in animal nutrition or fish nutrition and feed technology for period of 3 years.

== Swami Vivekananda Single Child Scholarship for Research in Social Science ==
This scholarship is for a single woman pursuing a Ph.D in social sciences in an UGC approved institute/university.

== ESSO-NCESS Junior Research Fellowship ==
This fellowship is for scholars who has passed CSIR-UGC NET exam for JRF and pursuing a Ph.D in areas of earth system sciences.
