= Higher education in India =

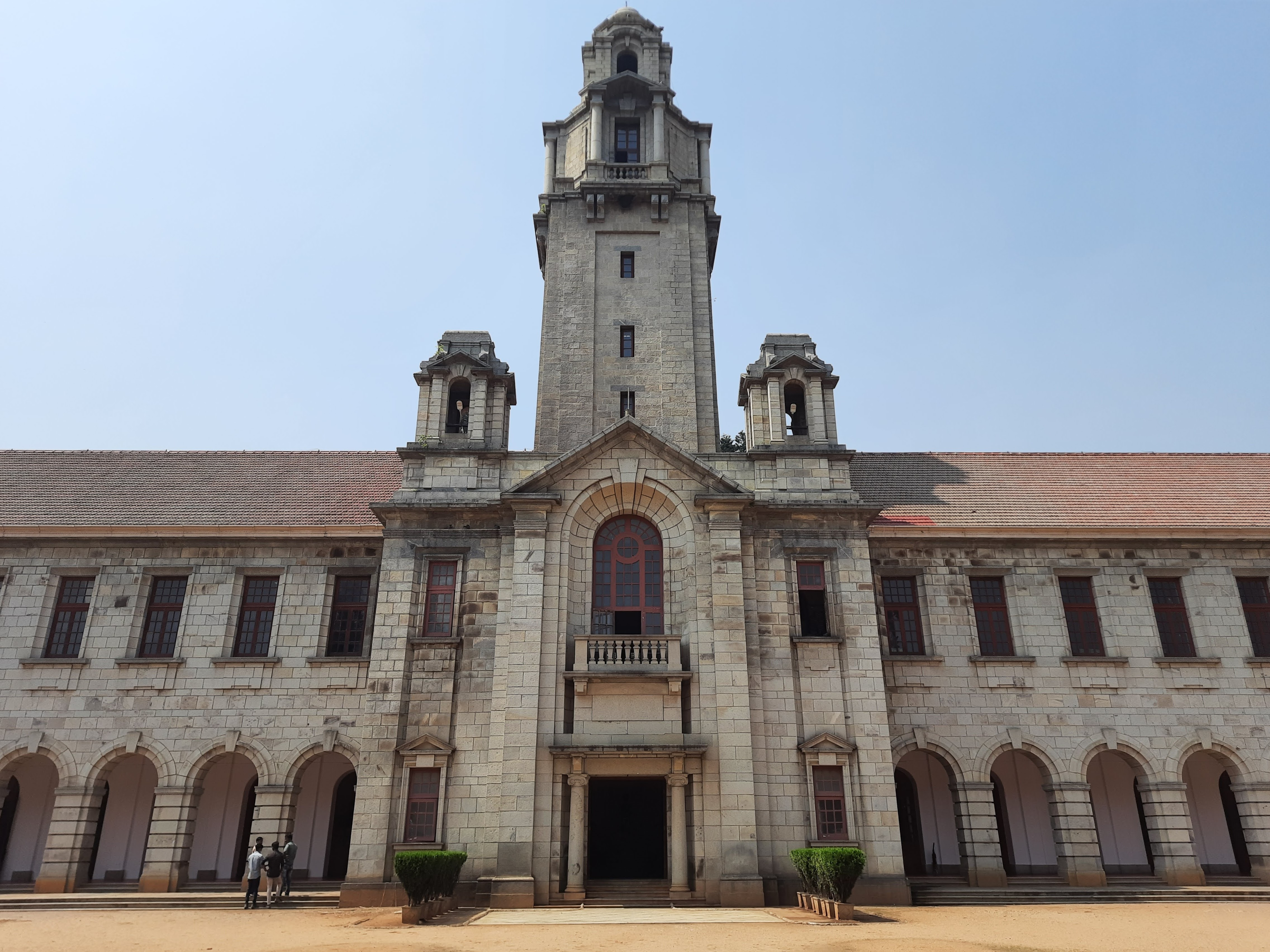
Indian Institute of Science in Bangalore

Higher education system in India includes both public and private universities. Public universities are supported by the union government and the state governments, while private universities are mostly supported by various bodies and societies. Universities in India are recognized by the University Grants Commission (UGC), which draws its power from the University Grants Commission Act, 1956. The main governing body is the University Grants Commission, which enforces its standards, advises the government, and helps coordinate between the center and the state. Accreditation for higher learning is overseen by various autonomous institutions established by the University Grants Commission (UGC).

As of 2025, India has over 1000 universities, with 57 central universities, 416 state universities, 147 deemed universities, 361 state private universities and 159 Institutes of National Importance which include AIIMS, IIMs, IIITs, IISERs, IITs and NITs among others. The country also has 53,354 colleges, including government degree colleges, private colleges, standalone institutes and post-graduate research institutions, functioning under these universities as reported by the Department of Higher Education in 2026. Colleges may be autonomous, i.e., empowered to examine their own degrees, up to PhD level in some cases, or non-autonomous, in which case their examinations are under the supervision of the university to which they are affiliated; in either case, however, degrees are awarded in the name of the university rather than the college.

Apart from these institutions, there are several parallel, state, and nationally accredited bodies that provide professional and vocational educational programs, like the National Skill Development Corporation, Gramin Skill Development Mission, and the Centre for Development of Advanced Computing. Open education and distance learning are overseen by the Distance Education Council. Indira Gandhi National Open University (IGNOU) is the oldest distance education university in the country, transitioning from correspondence to online delivery of education, and has the largest number of student enrollments.

== History ==
India is believed to have had a system of higher education as early as 1000 B.C. Unlike present day universities, these ancient learning centers were primarily concerned with dispersing Vedic education. The modern Indian education system finds its roots in colonial legacy. British colonists used the university system as a tool of cultural colonization. Colonial efforts in higher education were carried out initially through the East India Company, followed by the British parliament and later under direct British rule. The first institution of higher learning set up by the British East India Company was the Calcutta Madrasa in 1781. This was followed by the Asiatic Society of Bengal in 1784, Benaras Sanskrit College in 1791 and Fort William College in 1800. With the Charter Act 1813, the British Parliament officially declared Indian education as one of the duties of the state. The same act also removed restrictions on missionary work in British India, thus leading to the establishment of the evangelist Serampore College in 1818. Thomas Babbington Macaulay's famously controversial Minute on Education (1835) reflected the growing support of a Western approach to knowledge over an Oriental one. Soon after, in 1857, the first three official universities were started in Bombay (Mumbai), Calcutta (Kolkata) and Madras (Chennai). Followed by the University of Punjab in 1882 and the University of Allahabad in 1887. These universities were modeled after the University of London and focused on English and the humanities

The British control of the Indian education system continued until the Government of India Act 1935 that transferred more power to provincial politicians and began the "Indianisation" of education. This period witnessed a rise in the importance of physical and vocational education as well as the introduction of basic education schemes. When India gained independence in 1947, the nation had a total of 241,369 students registered across 20 universities and 496 colleges. In 1948, the Indian Government established the University Education Commission to oversee the growth and improvement of higher education. In the 1960s and 1970s, the government increased its efforts to support higher education by not only setting up state-funded universities and colleges, but also providing financial assistance to private institutions, resulting in the creation of private aided/ grant-in-aid institutions.

Despite the departure of the British, Indian higher education continued to give importance to the languages and humanities until the 1980s. Institutes of professional education like the Indian Institutes of Technology (IITs), Birla Institute of Technology and Science Pilani (BITS), Regional Engineering Colleges (REC) and Indian Institutes of Management (IIM) were some of the more prominent exceptions to this trend. These institutions drew inspiration from reputed universities in the United States and also received foreign funding. However, the education system remained using colonial English instead of plain English as many ESL countries do under the view that sophistication of language used in education signifies quality of education instead of the quality of structured knowledge that is transferred. Post 1980s, the changing demands of the global economy, lack of foreign investment and political volatility, decreasing value of currency, and an increased strain on government governance capacity, slowed the growth of state-funded higher educational institutions. This led to an increased role of the private sector in the education system.

== Universities ==
Universities in India have evolved in divergent streams, with each stream monitored by an apex body indirectly controlled by the Ministry of Education and funded jointly by the state governments. Most universities are administered by the States; however, there are 18 important universities called Central Universities, which are maintained by the Union Government. The increased funding of the central universities gives them an advantage over their state competitors.

The University Grants Commission estimated that in 2013–14, 22,849 PhDs and 20,425 MPhil degrees were awarded. Over half of these were in the fields of Science, Engineering/Technology, Medicine and Agriculture. As of 2014–15, over 178,000 students were enrolled in research programs.

Apart from the several hundred state universities, there is a network of research institutions that provide opportunities for advanced learning and research leading up to a PhD in branches of science, technology and agriculture. Several have won international recognition.

Twenty-five of these institutions come under the umbrella of the CSIR – Council of Scientific and Industrial Research and over 60 fall under the ICAR – Indian Council of Agricultural Research. In addition, the DAE – Department of Atomic Energy, and other ministries support various research laboratories.

The National Institute of Technology (NITs) and Indian Institutes of Technology (IITs) are among the most prestigious institutions within the technology sciences.The Indian Agricultural Research Institute is one of the best in the country for agricultural education. Indian Institute of Science (IISc) and Indian Institute of Science Education and Research(IISERs) are the premier research institutes in the field of science education and research. There are several thousand colleges (affiliated to different universities) that provide undergraduate science, agriculture, commerce and humanities courses in India. Amongst these, the best also offer post graduate courses while some also offer facilities for research and PhD studies.

Technical education has grown rapidly in recent years. Of 27.3 million students enrolled in undergraduate studies, about 4.5 million are in engineering fields. With recent capacity additions, India now graduates over 500,000 engineers annually (with 4-year undergraduate degrees), along with approximately 50,000 computer science postgraduates. In addition, the nation graduates over 1.2 million scientists. Furthermore, each year, the nation is enrolling at least 350,000 in its engineering diploma programs (with plans to increase this by about 50,000). Thus, India's annual enrollment of scientists, engineers and technicians now exceeds 2 million.

Across the country, tertiary enrollment rates have increased at a compound annual growth rate of 3.5% in the 5 years preceding 2016. Current enrollment stands at 34.58 million, over 15% more than the 29.2 million enrolled in 2011.

International league tables produced in 2006 by the London-based Times Higher Education Supplement(THES) confirmed Jawaharlal Nehru University (JNU)'s place among the world's top 200 universities. Likewise, THES 2006 ranked JNU's School of Social Sciences at the 57th position among the world's top 100 institutes for social sciences. In 2017, THES ranked the Indian Institute of Science as the eighth best "small university" in the world. A small university was defined as one with less than 5000 students. In 2015, the institute also became the first Indian institute to make it to the top hundred in the THES list of engineering institutes. It was ranked 99.

The University of Calcutta was the first multi-disciplinary university of modern India. According to The Times Higher Education Supplement's survey of the world's top arts and humanities universities, dated 10 November 2005, this university, ranked 39, was the only Indian university to make it to the top 50 list in that year. Other research institutes are the Saha Institute of Nuclear Physics, the Asiatic Society, and the Indian Statistical Institute.

The National Law School of India University is highly regarded, with some of its students being awarded Rhodes Scholarships to Oxford University, and the All India Institute of Medical Sciences, New Delhi is consistently rated the top medical school in the country. Indian Institutes of Management (IIMs) are the top management institutes in India.

The private sector is strong in Indian higher education. This has been partly as a result of the decision by the Government to divert spending to the goal of universalisation of elementary education. Within a decade different state assemblies have passed bills for privately funded institutions, including Birla Institute of Technology and Science, Manipal Academy of Higher Education, Shiv Nadar University, Xavier Labour Relations Institute, O. P. Jindal Global University, Ashoka University and many more.

India is a leading source of international students around the world. More than 200,000 Indian students are studying abroad. They are likely to be enrolled in master's programs that provide them opportunities to enhance their career potential.

Following recent changes in education, India, through its NEP 2020 project, planned to establish the National Digital University (NDU) to provide cost-effective access to higher education through an online university. The NDU was designed around a hub-and-spoke model, offering its own educational programs while allowing qualified universities and institutions to provide courses and full-fledged programs. Its main proposed features included degree certificates from NDU or participating universities, standardized and regularly audited courses, accelerated degree programs, chunked content delivery, progressive examinations, real-world case projects, virtual AI assistants, peer learning, webinars, mobile-optimized learning, and industry apprenticeships. Students completing 50 percent of their courses through a particular partner institution could choose to receive their degree certificate from that institution or NDU, with the same national and international equivalency. The project was cancelled on February 1, 2026, due to India's capacity constraints and financial strain.

=== Post-secondary education stages ===
The new National Education Policy 2020 (NEP 2020) introduced by the central government is expected to bring profound changes to education in India. The policy approved by the Union Cabinet of India on 29 July 2020, outlines the vision of India's new education system. The new policy replaces the 1986 National Policy on Education. The policy is a comprehensive framework for elementary education to higher education as well as vocational training in both rural and urban India. The policy aims to transform India's education system by 2021.

Shortly after the release of the policy, the government clarified that no one will be forced to study any particular language and that the medium of instruction will not be shifted from English to any regional language. The language policy in NEP is a broad guideline and advisory in nature; and it is up to the states, institutions, and schools to decide on the implementation. Education in India is a Concurrent List subject.

NEP's higher education policy proposes a 4-year multi-disciplinary bachelor's degree in an undergraduate programme with multiple exit options. These will include professional and vocational areas and will be implemented

- A certificate after completing 1 year of study (vocational)
- A diploma after completing 2 years of study (vocational)
- A Bachelor's degree after completion of a 3-year program (preferred bachelor's degree)
- A 4-year multidisciplinary bachelor's degree (professional bachelor's degree)

Higher education stages in India
Category	Year	Ages	Comments
Undergraduate school	First year	18-19	1-year Vocational Certificate
Undergraduate school	Second year	19-20	2-years Vocational Diploma (50 - 60 credits)
Undergraduate school	Third year	20-21	3-years bachelor's degree (150 credits) or Advanced Diploma (120 credits)
Undergraduate school	Fourth year	21-22	4-years multidisciplinary bachelor's degree (120 -160 credits) or P.G. Diploma (60 credits)
Undergraduate school	Fifth year	22-23	5-years bachelor's degree like MBBS (180 - 200 credits) or law.
Graduate school	First year	21+	regular multidisciplinary master's degrees (120 -150 credits)
Graduate school	Second year	22+	regular multidisciplinary master's degrees (120 -150 credits)
Graduate school	Third year	23+	3-years master's degree like MCA with Internship (180 credits)
Doctorate		24+	Up to 5 years and 125 credits
Research
Postdoctoral			
Continuing education
Vocational school			
Educative education			

=== Accreditation ===
Indian law requires that universities be accredited unless created through an act of Parliament. Without accreditation, the government notes, "These fake institutions have no legal entity to call themselves as University/Vishwvidyalaya and to award ‘degree’ which are not treated as valid for academic/employment purposes." The University Grants Commission Act 1956 explains,

"the right of conferring or granting degrees shall be exercised only by a University established or incorporated by or under a Central Act, or a State Act, or an Institution deemed to be University or an institution specially empowered by an Act of the Parliament to confer or grant degrees. Thus, any institution which has not been created by an enactment of Parliament or a State Legislature or has not been granted the status of a Deemed to be University, is not entitled to award a degree."

The University Grants Commission has provided guidelines about fake universities/institutions and degrees, including a list of such schools.

Accreditation for higher learning is overseen by autonomous institutions established by the University Grants Commission:

- All India Council for Technical Education (AICTE)
- Distance Education Bureau (DEB)
- Indian Council of Agricultural Research (ICAR)
- Bar Council of India (BCI)
- National Assessment and Accreditation Council (NAAC)
- National Council for Teacher Education (NCTE)
- Rehabilitation Council of India (RCI)
- National Medical Commission (NMC)
- Pharmacy Council of India (PCI)
- Indian Nursing Council (INC)
- Dental Council of India (DCI)
- National Commission for Homoeopathy (NCH)
- Central Council of Indian Medicine (CCIM)
- Veterinary Council of India (VCI)

=== Graduation statistics ===
This chart is based on 2014-2015 data from the 2016 national statistics.

Post-graduate degree holders	Percentage
Social science	16.89
Management	16.65
Science	12.44
Commerce	8.45
IT and Computer science	7.87
Engineering and technology	7.18
Medical science	2.96
Others	12.41

== Administration ==
The institutional framework of higher education in India consists of Universities and Colleges. As reported in 2015, India has 760 universities and 38,498 colleges. There are three types of universities: Conventional Universities, Deemed Universities and Institutions of National Importance. While Conventional Universities are established through Act of Parliament or State Legislatures, Deemed Universities award degrees through the notification of the central government. Institutes of National Importance are those that have been awarded the status by Parliament.

The education system of India falls broadly under the Ministry of Human Resource Development(MHRD). Amongst the branches of the MHRD, the Department of Higher Education is responsible for overseeing the growth of the higher education sector. The department aims to improve quality of and access to higher education for all sections of the population. One of the key objectives of the department is to increase the Gross Enrolment Ratio (GER) in higher education to 30% by 2020. Some of the other objectives of the department include: expansion of institutional base, greater inclusion of minorities, removal of regional disparities, infrastructural improvement and increased global participation.

Current government initiatives include:

- Rashtriya Uchattar Shiksha Abhiyan - A total of 316 state public universities and 13,024 colleges will be covered under the Rashtriya Uchattar Shiksha Abhiyan, a plan to manage funding for higher education. This is a scheme to develop state university by central govt funding (60% for general category states, 90% for special category states, 100% for union territories).
- Scheme of Integrating Persons With Disabilities In The Mainstream Of Technical And Vocational Education - Caters to around 50 polytechnics in the country and provides them with grants-in-aid aimed at facilitating greater integration of disabled individuals into higher education.
- Scheme of Pandit Madan Mohan Malaviya National Mission on Teachers and Teaching (PMMMNMTT) - The purpose of this scheme is to raise the quantity and quality of teaching staff across schools and colleges. It also aims to create better institutional frameworks in order to cultivate change in the positive direction.

== Rankings ==
University rankings are used to measure and compare institutional quality based on a range of indicators related to research, reputation and teaching. Indian government's National Institutional Ranking Framework, or NIRF is the mechanism for measuring quality and also intended to determine funding and world-class university endeavors. While being popular, NIRF rankings have been criticized for being inaccurate and biased. Anil Kumar Tripathi, director of the Institute of Science, Banaras Hindu University, criticised the NIRF 2021 rankings, arguing that comparing IITs and IISc with large multidisciplinary universities like BHU is unfair.

The Indian Institute of Technology, Madras was ranked 1st among Overall Institutions in NIRF Overall Rankings 2022 with a score of 87.59, followed by IISc Banglore, IIT Bombay, IIT Delhi, IIT Kanpur and IIT Kharagpur. The Indian Institute of Science (IISc) was ranked 1st among Indian Universities in NIRF University Rankings 2022 with a score of 83.57 followed by Jawaharlal Nehru University, Jamia Millia Islamia, Jadavpur University, Amrita Vishwa Vidyapeetham and Banaras Hindu University. The Indian Institute of Technology, Madras was ranked 1st among the Indian Engineering Institutions in NIRF Engineering Rankings 2022 with a score of 90.04 followed by IIT Delhi, IIT Bombay, IIT Kanpur and IIT Kharagpur. The Indian Institute of Management Ahmedabad was ranked 1st among the Indian Management Institutions in NIRF Management Rankings 2022 with a score of 83.35 followed by IIM Banglore, IIM Calcutta, IIT Delhi and IIM Kozhikode. The AIIMS, New Delhi was ranked 1st among the Indian Medical Institutions in NIRF Medical Rankings 2024 with a score of 91.60 followed by PGIMER, Christian Medical College, NIMHANS and JIPMER. The "Institutions of Eminence (IoE)" initiative by the Government of India aims to build top-ranked Indian universities by providing autonomy and funding (only for public universities) and identified six institutions.

The University of Mumbai was ranked 41 among the Top 50 Engineering Schools of the world by America's news broadcasting firm Business Insider in 2012 and was the only university in the list from the five emerging BRICS nations (viz. Brazil, Russia, India, China, and South Africa). It was ranked at 62 in the QS BRICS University rankings for 2013 and was India's 3rd best Multi Disciplinary University in the QS University ranking of Indian Universities after University of Calcutta and Delhi University.

Three Indian universities were listed in the Times Higher Education list of the world's top 200 universities — Indian Institutes of Technology, Indian Institutes of Management, and Jawaharlal Nehru University in 2005 and 2006. Six Indian Institutes of Technology and the Birla Institute of Technology and Science Pilani were listed among the top 20 science and technology schools in Asia by Asiaweek. The Indian School of Business situated in Hyderabad was ranked number 12 in global MBA rankings by the Financial Times of London in 2010 while the All India Institute of Medical Sciences has been recognised as a global leader in medical research and treatment. The Quacquarelli Symonds (QS) World University Rankings published in 2013 ranked IIT Delhi at number 222 with a 49.4% score, IIT Bombay at 233, and IIT Kanpur at 295. No Indian universities appear in the top 200 worldwide except IISc Bangalore which is ranked at 147.

== Structural competency approaches ==
Indian higher education has been known for ensuring equality of access to education, but experts argue that it needs reforms in standards, giving value, and pacing informed by evidence driven practices and strategies. Many have said that focus on enforcing both streamlining and holding higher standards of curriculum with the help of international academic publishers for transparency and reducing inequalities characterised by globalisation is needed, Additionally, many have emphasized on the vocational and doctoral education pipeline value-oriented and innovative; personalisation of the sector for students to gain immediate and valid transferable credentials in their own pace (e.g., Massive open online course, digital learning, etc.); empowering students to seamlessly transition in and out of both education and the workforce as needed while providing continuous learning experience blocks at each stages of education opportunities for equipping the individuals with essential knowledge building blocks for comprehensive understanding of the skill providing courses; establishing a robust institutional accountability in service delivery and addressing related complexities; collaborating with international standardization agencies to ensure that students receive global recognition for their educational certificates, for guaranteeing employers that the educational content aligns with what esteemed universities worldwide employ, etc. are fundamental changes that are critical in attaining both international and national competency.

The rise of interest in the IT sector and engineering education in India has confined students to cramming knowledge, providing them with fewer opportunities to explore and develop their passions with modern educational elements like cooperative education and work-based training. Furthermore, by the end of the four-year degree, much of what students study in the initial years becomes irrelevant or subject to knowledge erosion. Many foreign countries view the traditional degree pathway, which compels students of working age to halt their careers for half a decade to earn a degree in a digitized academic environment, as less effective and unsuitable for a growing economy. Especially in a world where 40% of the global population was connected to the Internet in 2015 through 25 billion devices, and where in STEM fields, "micro-certificates" are a required aspect of lifelong learning to stay relevant; many of these micro-certificates or learning blocks either function as a start of a base of knowledge or add on to an existing base. For example, most programming courses only take 3 months to learn in an academic setting and that too along with other subjects, and are the only requirement of base knowledge for springboard programming related tech jobs.

Educationalists, based on evidence-based literature, assert that education should be encapsulated by the "6Cs": critical thinking, content, communication, collaboration, creativity, character, and citizenship. To broaden students' worldviews and instill values such as creativity, character, and citizenship, experts observe that India needs to focus on introducing elective pathways to liberal arts education. The aim is to facilitate the development of personal management skills, passions, creativity, and foster natural and concerted personal growth.

== Challenges ==
In the last 30 years, higher education in India has witnessed rapid and impressive growth. The increase in the number of institutions is, however, disproportionate to the quality of education that is being dispersed. Unplanned over-expansion is often criticized as one of the biggest downfalls of Indian higher education. Many institutions suffer from subpar quality and a lack of funding. As a result, entry into the top institutions is highly competitive and translates into a contest for higher entrance test scores and better private coaching institutes.

Higher education in India faces problems ranging from income and gender disparities in enrolment, to poor quality of faculty and teaching and even to a general lack of motivation and interest amongst students. Industries cite skill shortage as one of the major factors contributing to the mounting number of unemployed graduates. Some of the main challenges faced by the Indian higher education system include:

- Financing – The inability of the state to fund the expanding higher education system has resulted in the rapid growth of private higher education. In addition, diminished governmental financial support adversely affects small and rural educational institutions. A growing number of public institutions are forced to resort to self-financing courses and high tuition costs. The private sector's primary modes of financing include donations, capitation fees and exorbitant fee rates. This in turn limits general accessibility to higher education, by catering to only an elite few.
- Enrolment – As of 2019–20, Gross Enrolment Ratio in higher education is 27.3 for 18 – 23 year old age group. On the whole, India has an enrolment rate of 9% which is similar to that of other lower middle income countries. The population that is enrolled in higher education consists largely of urban metropolitan dwellers. Rural enrolment in higher education is very low. Moreover, a majority of the recorded enrolment is at the undergraduate level. Over the last 4 years, Indian higher education has maintained a steady female enrolment rate of around 45%. Although the gender gap in enrolment has decreased significantly post-independence, there still exists a disparity amongst different departments. Technology, medicine and commerce are some of the areas of study that are heavily male-dominated while humanities departments show the opposite trend.
- Accreditation - Driven by market opportunities and entrepreneurial zeal, many institutions are taking advantage of the lax regulatory environment to offer 'degrees' not approved by Indian authorities, and many institutions are functioning as pseudo non-profit organisations, developing sophisticated financial methods to siphon off the 'profits'. Regulatory authorities like UGC and AICTE have been trying to extirpate private universities that run courses with no affiliation or recognition. Students from rural and semi-urban background often fall prey to these institutes and colleges.
- Quality - The quality of programs structure-wise and quality-wise are substandard and lack objectives that can meet the basic industrial requirement of "skilled-professionals." However, the assessment methods employed are taxing and the pacing of the courses (quantity over quality approach) are made forcefully quick under the assumption that these are the essential indicators of 'show' quality (appearance quality). These unscientific strategies and promotion of survival mentality instead of growth mentality leads to unsuccessful learning among students. Streamlining of bachelor's program was brought in the Indian system by following other countries by educators who proved they could give the same quality that a four-year degree could provide with a three-year degree. However, the vision of these resolute educators are lost in time, and sub-standardization and political objectives took over the program structure. For example, when a 21st-century three year Indian bachelor's program is compared with a four-year International bachelor's programs it would be in quality only worth of a two-year college program because usually the first year of these programs are heavily focused on general and arts subjects. When core courses of these programs that cover the same topic are compared, Indian courses lack both leading building blocks of learning content, and the depth and fluidity of international courses. A minimum of 65 - 70 percent mastery threshold that internationally is considered as basic readiness for advancing from foundational to advanced courses is not required in Indian programs. Lack of quality in education resulting from these drawbacks lead students gaining substandard and unclear knowledge which in-turn leads to mass unemployment rates among educated youths of India, and it's primarily due to this learned incompetency or incapacity. As part of the ongoing reformation of the National Education Policy (NEP), the Indian government plans to shift academic curriculums from the perspective of academics to that of professors with practical industry experience. Additionally, there are plans to introduce four-year degree programs instead of restructuring the existing three-year degrees with the aims to ensure competence and quality while offering students a wider range of options. Furthermore, there are plans to establish accelerated two-year bachelor's degree programs that meet international standards to address the increasing demand for skilled professionals in specific sectors, and providing curriculum licensing agreements to industry giants, allowing them to hire workers at a young age and provide them with on-the-job education to obtain a respective University education. Bringing four-year degree programs is seen with doubt by the media during a time and period when nations with four-year degree programs are lamenting the sustainability of prolonged educational pathways. Experts opine that in an age marked by the widespread availability of information and the rise of modern technologies, traditional educational structures fails to meet the dynamic demands of the labor market.
- Value - From the perspective of some experts, higher education in India no longer provides the value it once did, partly because of quality issues and its lack of responsiveness to actual labour-market needs. The mere expansion of higher education has not been matched by a comparable expansion in well-paying graduate employment, weakening the traditional expectation that obtaining a degree will reliably lead to upward socioeconomic mobility. Many also see inadequate political responses to growing problems, including a stagnant labour market, dismissiveness toward young people's concerns, insufficient alternative pathways to comparable life and educational outcomes, and the structural barriers to accessing quality education and opportunities, as further constraining the aspirations of a rapidly growing population in an increasingly globalised world, where expectations of opportunity, economic security, social mobility, and quality of life have become increasingly important.
- Politics - Higher education is a high stakes issue in India. It is subject to heavy government involvement. Despite the system's lack of state funding, 15.5% of government expenditure goes toward higher education. Also, many prominent political figures either own or sit on the managerial board of the Universities. This leads to the exertion of intense political pressures on the administration of these institutions. Caste based reservations make Indian higher education an even more contested topic. While some make the case that caste-based quotas are necessary to tackle prevailing socio-economic disparities, others see it as exclusionary to upper-caste individuals. The NEP reformation further helps to increase these problems where educators will hold a power to act based on caste and religion based politics in determining who will go further in studies and who should not. This effectively reduces the race for quality education at quality institutions in favor of majority power holders. As a result of biased inclusionism that does not fit for needs of the society as whole and the historic exclusionism of minorities, student activisms are rampant, apart from this political organization of academic staff are widespread to protect their own interests.

The complex socio-political nature of the education sector in India makes it difficult to implement social reform. As a result, the overall quality of education suffers.

== Student advisory ==
While fee regulatory agencies fix a fee that cover expenses incurred by an institution along with a basic surplus, many institutions have been charging a fee that makes the venture profiteering. All India Council for Technical Education (AICTE), the regulatory body for technical education in India, has called "upon the students, parents and the general public not to pay any capitation fee or any other fee other than that mentioned in the Prospectus of the Institutions for consideration of admission." AICTE also mentions that the fee charged to students, including for programs such as PGDM, has to be approved by the fee regulatory committee of the state, and the institute should mention the fee on its website. As per AICTE norms, the business schools are not meant to charge a fee higher than what is mentioned in the prospectus. Educational regulatory agencies, at the national level and the regional level, have mandated that an institution should include the fee in the prospectus.

== See also ==
- Education in India
- Capitation fee
- Academic ranks in India
- Ministry of Education (India)
- National Education Policy 2020
- Science and technology in India
- Medical education in India
- Vocational education in India
- List of universities in India
- University Grants Commission (India)
- List of institutions of higher education in India
- List of countries by spending on education (% of GDP)
