= National Geographical Society of India =

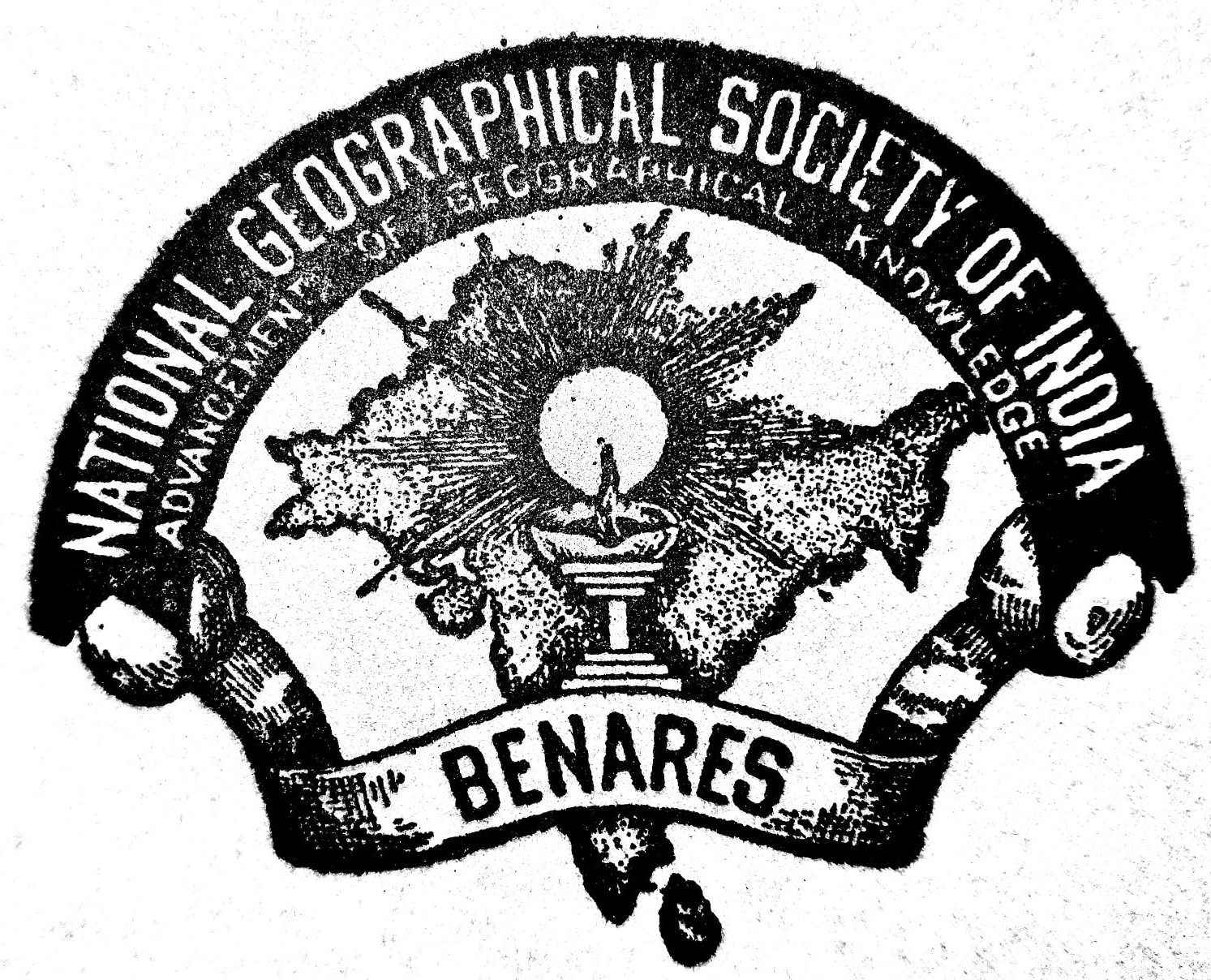
- Formation: 1946; 80 years ago
- Founder: Professor Harbans Lal Chhibbar (1899-1955)
- Founded at: Banaras Hindu University, Varanasi, India
- Type: Learned Society
- Headquarters: Department of Geography, Banaras Hindu University
- Official language: English, Hindi
- Honorary Secretary: Professor V. N. Sharma, Department of Geography, BHU
- Award: 1. Jawahar Lal Nehru Medal; 2. Vallabh Bhai Patel Medal; 3. Madan Mohan Malviya Medal
- Website: https://www.bhu.ac.in/site/UnitHomeTemplate/1_3320_5966_The-National-Geographical-Society-of-India(NGSI)-Home

The National Geographical Society of India (NGSI) is a non-profit scientific and educational society and professional body for geography. Established in 1946 at the Department of Geography, Institute of Science, Banaras Hindu University, it is one of the oldest and leading professional bodies for geography in India. The stated aim of the society is to advance geographical knowledge and support geographers in India and around the world.

== History ==
It was founded in 1946 by Harbans Lal Chhibbar (1899–1955), a noted geologist and geographer who also founded the Department of Geography at Banaras Hindu University. He was succeeded by Ram Lochan Singh (1917–2001), who earned a doctorate from the London School of Economics.

Between 1955 and 1970, the activities of NGSI expanded. In 1964, "Research Publication Series’ was launched, and the Society grew through hosting seminars, conferences, and symposiums; Summer School (1966); collaboration with the International Geographical Union and leading international geographers from different centers of eminence across the world.

In the year 1971, Silver Jubilee of NGSI was celebrated by organising a symposium on "Rural Settlements in Monsoon Asia" on behalf of the IGU Commission. This occasion was also marked by the release of the book India: A Regional Geography (ed. R.L. Singh). This monumental work earned international repute and recognition for the Society and appreciation for the Indian geographers’ insight,, abilityand rigour.

== Scientific publications ==
=== Journals ===
==== National Geographical Journal of India ====
National Geographical Journal of India
- Discipline: Geography
- Language: English
- Edited by: Srabani Sanyal

Publication details
- History: 1955–present
- Publisher: National Geographical Society of India, Institute of Science, Banaras Hindu University (India)
- Frequency: Quarterly

Standard abbreviations
- ISO 4: Natl. Geogr. J. India

Indexing
- ISSN: 0027-9374
- LCCN: 59032766
- OCLC no.: 1606287

Links
- Journal homepage; Online archive

The National Geographical Journal of India is a quarterly peer-reviewed academic journal covering research on all aspects of geography. It is published by the National Geographical Society of India, which is housed at the Department of Geography, Institute of Science, Banaras Hindu University. The journal was established in 1955. The editor-in-chief is Srabani Sanyal of the Department of Geography of Banaras Hindu University. In 1972, NGJI was ranked 50th among periodical titles internationally in a quantitative analysis of periodical articles in geography and their distribution.

==== Rashtriya Bhaugolik Patrika ====
Rashtriya Bhaugolik Patrika (transl. National Geographical Journal) is the biannual Hindi journal published since 2010 by the NGSI with an ISSN of 2230-9942. It was started at the 150th birth anniversary of Mahamana Madan Mohan Malviya.

==== Inactive publications ====
- Bulletins of National Geographical Society of India [1946-1954]
- Geo-Sciences Journal [1986-1989]

=== Books ===
The Society has published over 60 bulletins, research reports, books, and monographs. Some of the important ones are mentioned below.

1. India: A Regional Geography
2. Rural Settlements in Monsoon Asia
3. Clan Settlements in Saran Plain

== Past conferences ==
Between 1966 and 2020, the Society organized over 45 national and international seminars. Four each were sponsored by the International Geographical Union and the University Grants Commission (New Delhi). National Summer School in "Applied Geography" (1–10 November 1966) was the first ever conference or symposium organized by the NGSI. IGU-sponsored conferences were conducted in 1968, 1971, 1975, and 1979; the first one was focused on urban geography, and the other three were focused on rural settlements.
