= Indian Institute of Science Education and Research, Mohali =

Educational institute in Punjab, India

Indian Institute of Science Education and Research (IISER) Mohali
- Motto in English: In Pursuit of Knowledge
- Type: Public university
- Established: 2006; 20 years ago
- Founder: Narayanasami Sathyamurthy
- Affiliations: Autonomous, Institute of National Importance
- Chairman: Jhillu Singh Yadav
- Director: Anil Kumar Tripathi
- Academic staff: 125
- Students: 1,668
- Undergraduates: 1,085
- Doctoral students: 583
- Location: IISER Mohali, Knowledge City, Sector -81, Mohali, Punjab.-140306, Mohali, Punjab, India; 30.663611°N 76.7275°E
- Campus: Urban, 125 acres
- Website: www.iisermohali.ac.in

Indian Institute of Science Education and Research Mohali (IISER Mohali) is an autonomous public research institute established in 2007 at Mohali, Punjab, India. It is one of the seven Indian Institutes of Science Education and Research (IISERs), established by the Ministry of Human Resources and Development, Government of India, to research in frontier areas of science and to provide science education at the undergraduate and postgraduate level. It was established after IISER Pune and IISER Kolkata and is recognized as an Institute of National Importance by the GoI. Institute focuses on pure research as well as interdisciplinary research in various fields of science. It is located in Knowledge City, Mohali, where the campuses of other research institutes like INST, CIAB and NABI are also located.

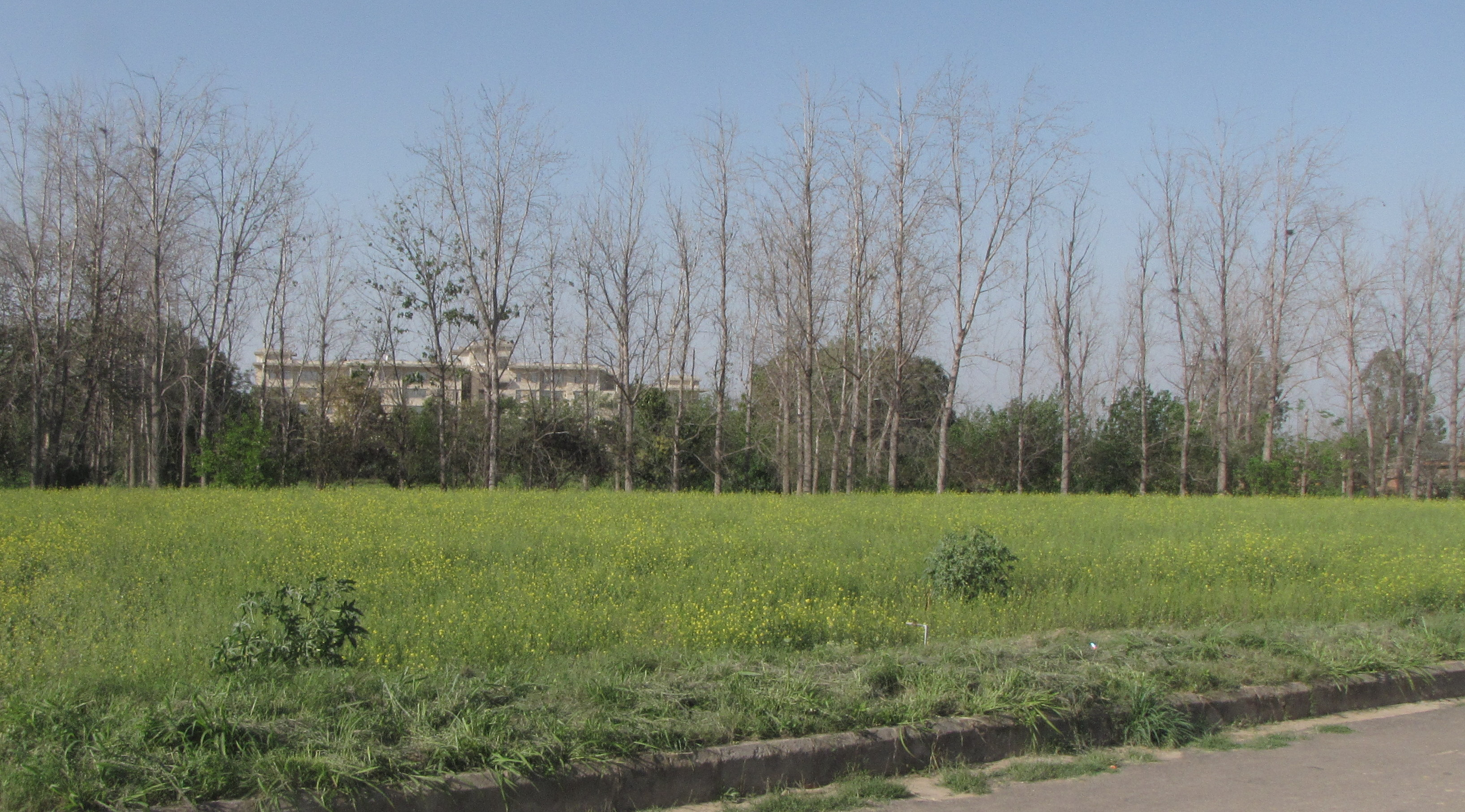
IISER Mohali in spring

== History ==
The institute was approved by The Planning Commission in New Delhi in July 2006 and land was provided by The Punjab State government. The foundation stone of IISER Mohali was laid on 27 September 2006 by the former Prime Minister of India, Manmohan Singh. The Computing Facility of IISER Mohali was inaugurated on 3 September 2007 by T. Ramasami (Secretary, Department of Science and Technology). The Earth-breaking ceremony for IISER boundary wall was held on 29 December 2008 at the proposed campus site in Knowledge City, Sector 81, S.A.S. Nagar. The ceremony was performed by N. Sathyamurthy, the founding director of the institute.

C.N.R. Rao inaugurated the Chemistry Research Laboratory on 8 April 2009. The Central Analytical Facility of IISER Mohali has been inaugurated in March 2010. Initially, the institute started its working from a transit campus in Mahatma Gandhi State Institute of Public Administration (MGSIPA), Chandigarh. In March 2010, the institute started shifting to its permanent campus in Knowledge City at Sector 81 with the opening of Central Analytical Facility (CAF) and completed the shifting in May 2013 by shutting operations in MGSIPAP complex, Sector 26, Chandigarh.

== Academics ==
=== Academic Programs ===
The institute offers the following programs:

- Integrated Master's level (B.S.-M.S.): Admission to this program is after 10+2 years of school training and is done through the IISERs Joint Admissions Committee.
- Integrated Doctoral Program (Int. Ph.D.): Integrated Ph.D. involves a master's degree (M.S. Research) followed by a doctorate (Ph.D.). Students may opt for MS exit after 2 years coursework and 1 year mandatory thesis work(after completing coursework). Students admitted under this program are entitled to the Institute fellowship, starting from MS 1st year till 4th year of Ph.D. Students after three years of undergraduate education can join the program.
- Doctoral Program (Ph.D.): IISER Mohali has a separate doctoral program, in hard sciences or in the Humanities & Social Sciences Department, which requires a master's degree as qualification.

=== Admissions ===
Admissions to UG courses in IISERs are done exclusively through the IISER Aptitude Test (IAT)

=== Reputation and Rankings ===
University rankings

General – India
- NIRF (Overall) (2024): 64
- NIRF (Research) (2024): 49

The National Institutional Ranking Framework (NIRF) ranked it 70 overall in India in 2025.

== Organization and administration ==
=== Departments ===
IISER Mohali is currently having six departments:

- Department of Physical Sciences
- Department of Chemical Sciences
- Department of Mathematical Sciences
- Department of Biological Science
- Department of Earth Science
- Department of Humanities and Social Sciences

== Student life ==
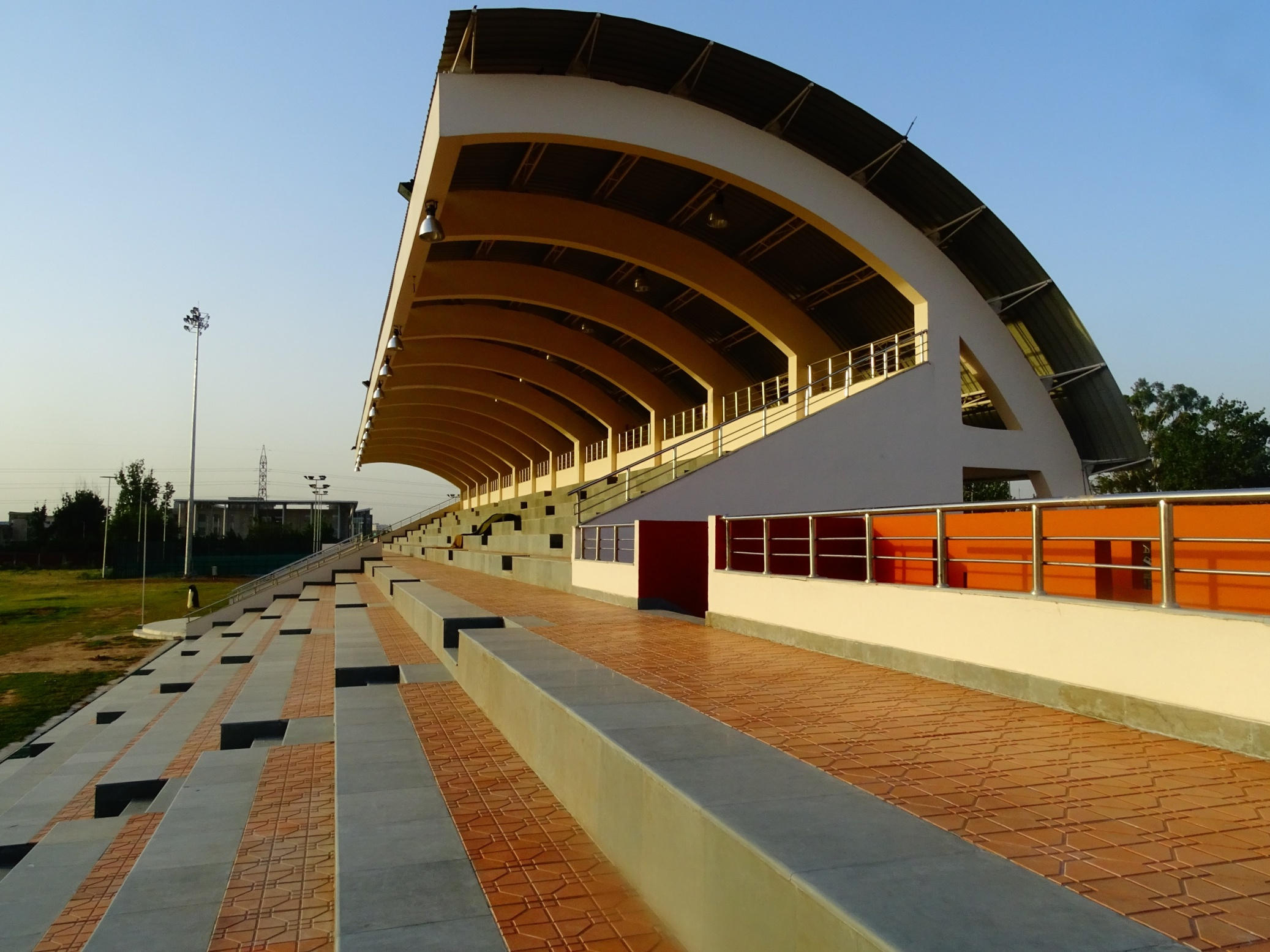
IISER Mohali's stadium (Capacity: >1000)

=== National Science Day celebrations ===
National Science Day celebrations on 28 February are a regular feature at IISER Mohali, every year. Invitations are sent to schools in Mohali, Chandigarh, Panchkula and nearby areas. The focus of the day is on science and mathematics demonstrations prepared by IISER Mohali students and faculty members. A large number of schools send teams for inter-school competitions such as science quizzes, group discussions, treasure hunt, junkyard wars, poster presentation held on this day. Other non-competitive events such as documentary screening, anti-superstition demonstrations, etc. are also held. The day usually ends with a 'panel discussion' in which the school students ask science-related questions to a panel of faculty members of IISER Mohali. Since 2015, the Science Day celebrations have been shifted to 27 September, IISER Mohali's Foundation Day, as this date is more convenient for school students in the region.

=== Opportunity Cell ===
The Opportunity Cell was first proposed by the Student Representative Council, in October 2011 as a joint student-faculty body to provide guidance to students about research and job opportunities. In the year 2012−13, the opportunity cell established a summer research and internship programme with National Centre for Biological Sciences (NCBS), Bangalore, Connexios Life sciences and Lucid Software Limited (Lucid). It also organised various seminars such as "Alternative Careers in Science", "Research Opportunities at University of St Andrews" etc. Currently the cell disseminates information about summer research programmes, PhD positions and research oriented jobs.

=== Student representation ===
The students enrolled in the institute are represented by Student Representative Council (SRC), whose members are voted by an election held annually.

=== Festivals ===
Insomnia is the main cultural festival that is held every year but with the access restricted to the students belonging to the campus. The students participate in the Inter-IISERs Cultural Meet (IICM) along with Inter-IISERs Sports Meet (IISM), each of which is hosted by one of the IISERs consortium along with IISc, CEBS and NISER.

=== Magazine ===
Manthan, IISER Mohali's student magazine was revived in the summer of 2018 after a long gap. Six editions, along with a lockdown Life in Quarantine edition, have been published since its revival.

== Notable people ==
=== Current faculty ===
- Inder Bir Singh Passi, Bhatnagar Prize-winning Mathematician
- Anand Kumar Bachhawat, Geneticist and Biochemist
- Kausik Chattopadhyay, N-Bios laureate
- Kapil Hari Paranjape, Bhatnagar Prize winning Mathematician
- Sudeshna Sinha, Physicist
- Anu Sabhlok, Architect and a well known geographer and feminist scholar
- Somdatta Sinha, theoretical biologist
- Debi Prasad Sarkar, Bhatnagar Prize-winning biochemist
- Biman B. Nath, an astrophysicist and a bilingual author

=== Former Faculty ===
- Meera Nanda, Historian and Philosopher of Science
- Narayanasami Sathyamurthy, Bhatnagar Prize winning Chemist and President of Chemical Research Society of India. He was the director of IISER Mohali from 2007 to 2017

=== Former Directors ===
- Jayaraman Gowrishankar (Jan 2020 - Feb 2024)
- Siva Umapathy (Officiating) (Aug 2019 - Jan 2020)
- Arvind (Officiating) (Feb 2019 - Aug 2019)
- Debi Prasad Sarkar (Sep 2017 - Feb 2019)
- Narayanasami Sathyamurthy (Jun 2007 - Sep 2017)
