= Anand Kumar Bachhawat =

Indian geneticist and biochemist (born 1958)

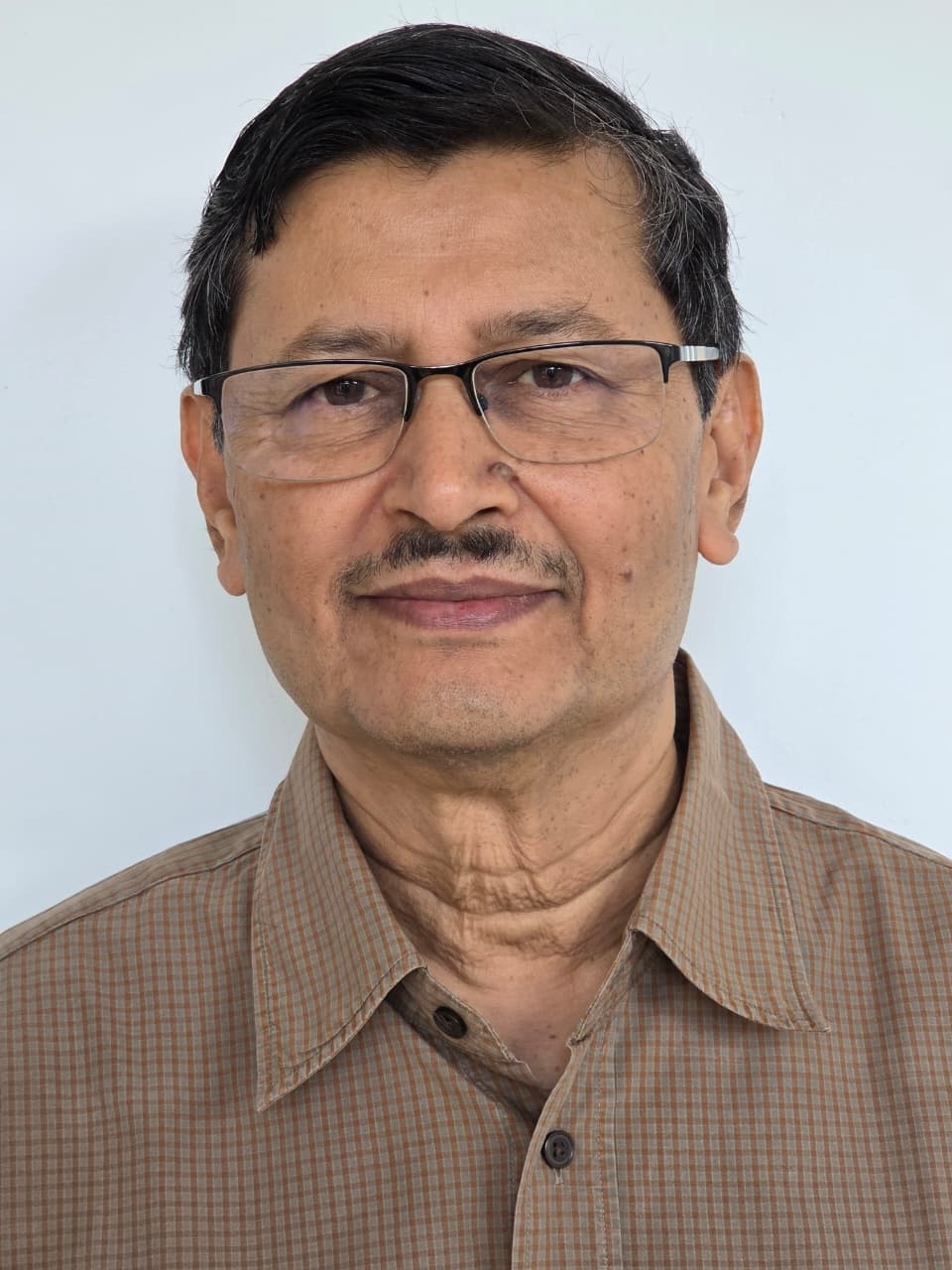
- Born: 1 October 1958 (age 67); India
- Education: IIT Kanpur
- Known for: Studies on microbial genetics
- Awards: 2000 N-BIOS Prize
- Scientific career
- Fields: Genetics; Biochemistry
- Workplaces: IISER Mohali

Anand Kumar Bachhawat (born 1 October 1958) is an Indian geneticist, biochemist, professor in biological sciences and the dean of faculty at the Indian Institute of Science Education and Research, Mohali. Known for his studies on microbial genetics, Bachhawat is an elected fellow of all the three major Indian science academies namely Indian Academy of Sciences, National Academy of Sciences, India and Indian National Science Academy. He is the son of Bimal Kumar Bachhawat.

Bachhawat, an alumnus of the Indian Institute of Technology, Kanpur from where he secured a PhD, heads the Bachawat Lab at the Department of Biological Sciences of IISER Mohali. His studies have been documented by way of a number of articles and the online repository of scientific articles of the Indian Academy of Sciences has listed 29 of them. He also holds patents for the biochemical processes he has developed. The Department of Biotechnology of the Government of India awarded him the National Bioscience Award for Career Development, one of the highest Indian science awards, for his contributions to biosciences in 2000.

== Selected bibliography ==
=== Chapters ===
- Iqbal Ahmad; Anand Kumar Bachhawa; Anil Kumar Yadav (3 August 2010). "Metabolic Pathways as Drug Targets: Targeting the Sulphur Assimilatory Pathways of Yeast and Fungi for Novel Drug Discovery". In Mohammad Owais; Mohammed Shahid; Farrukh Aqil (eds.). Combating Fungal Infections: Problems and Remedy. Springer Science & Business Media. pp. 327–. ISBN 978-3-642-12173-9.

=== Articles ===
- Deshpande, Anup Arunrao; Bhatia, Muskan; Laxman, Sunil; Bachhawat, Anand Kumar (2017). "Thiol trapping and metabolic redistribution of sulfur metabolites enable cells to overcome cysteine overload". Microbial Cell. 4 (4): 112–126. doi:10.15698/mic2017.04.567. PMC 5376351. PMID 28435838.
- Kaur, Amandeep; Gautam, Ruchi; Srivastava, Ritika; Chandel, Avinash; Kumar, Akhilesh; Karthikeyan, Subramanian; Bachhawat, Anand Kumar (2017). "ChaC2: An Enzyme for Slow Turnover of Cytosolic Glutathione". Journal of Biological Chemistry. 292 (2) (published 2016): 638–651. doi:10.1074/jbc.M116.727479. PMC 5241738. PMID 27913623.
- Kumar, Shailesh; Kushwaha, Hariom; Bachhawat, Anand Kumar; Raghava, Gajendra Pal Singh; Ganesan, Kaliannan (2012). "Genome Sequence of the Oleaginous Red Yeast Rhodosporidium toruloides MTCC 457". Eukaryot Cell. 11 (8): 1083–1084. doi:10.1128/EC.00156-12. PMC 3416060. PMID 22858828.

== See also ==
- Isoprenoids
- Carotenoid
