= Biman B. Nath =

Educator, writer

Biman B Nath
- Born: 1964 (age 61–62); Assam, India
- Education: University of Maryland

Biman B. Nath (born 1964) is an educator, scientist, cosmologist, astrophysicist, and bilingual author from Bangalore, India. He writes in English and Bengali (fiction and non-fiction). He is currently a visiting professor at IISER Mohali. Previously, he was a professor in Astronomy and Astrophysics at Raman Research Institute, Bangalore, India.

His 2022 book Homi J Bhabha sheds light on the rich scientific legacy of Homi J Bhabha and his vision for India. Asian Age described the book as an authentic biography of a scientific pioneer.

== Early life ==
Biman Nath was born in Assam to Binode Bihari Nath and Sabita Nath. He attended Narsing H S School and Gurucharan College in Silchar, then received his bachelor's degree in physics from Delhi University's Kirori Mal College, followed by a doctorate in astronomy from the University of Maryland, College Park in 1992.

== Career ==
Nath was a postdoctoral fellow at the Max Planck Institute for Radio Astronomy in Germany, then at the Inter-University Centre for Astronomy and Astrophysics India. He was a visiting professor at the Joint Institute for Laboratory Astrophysics, University of Colorado in 2004. He joined the Raman Research Institute in 1997. He has received the Vikram Sarabhai research award for space science in 2005. He has authored and co-authored more than 120 research papers. He is an active member of the International Astronomical Unit. He is often invited to deliver talks on research and development in astrophysics and astronomy. He also wrote columns for national papers such as Indian Express, The Hindu, and other newspapers.

== Books ==
He has authored several books (fiction and non-fiction), including the following:

- Mohabishwer Prothom Aalo (First light in the Universe), Book in Bengali, 2002, Anustup (Kolkata, India).
- Dawn of the Universe (Universities Press (India), 2005) (A review of his book ‘Dawn of the Universe’ published in Resonance.
- Nokkhotrer gaan (Song of stars), Book in Bengali, 2006, Ananda Publishers (Kolkata, India).A review of his book ‘Nakkhotrer Gan’ (Bengali) published in the Guruchandali (in Bengali).
- Eyes on the sky: The story of telescope, Vigyan Prasar, 2010
- The story of helium and the birth of astrophysics, Springer (US), 2013. A review of his book ‘The story of helium and the birth of astrophysics’ published in the Journal of Astronomy History and Heritage (2013: November issue)
- Homi J Bhabha: A renaissance man among scientists, Niyogi Books (New Delhi), 2022
- Nokkhotrer sathe kotha koy prithibir pran (Stars and life on Earth), Book in Bengali, 2022, Sahitya Samsad (Kolkata)
- Solar system in verse, Niyogi Books (New Delhi) , 2022 (February, 2023)
- Ashanto Mahabishwo (The violent universe), Book in Bengali, 2023, Sahitya Samsad (Kolkata)
- Bishmoye tai jaage (translations of articles and letters by Rachel Carson), Book in Bengali, 2024, Nirjhar (Kolkata). A review of his book ‘Bishmoye tai jaage’ (Bengali) published in Sangbad Pratidin (in Bengali)
- Nothing is Blue (HarperCollins India, 2009)
- The Tattooed Fakir (Pan Macmillan 2014)

== Awards ==
- Rabindra Puraskar for his work Mohabishwer Prothom Aalo (Science) (2005).
- Vikram Sarabhai Research Award for Space Science in 2005 (awarded by Physical Research Laboratory, Ahmedabad.
- Indira Gandhi Prize (for popularization of science) shared along with BN DWivedi - Awarded by Indian National Science Academy.
- 2000 Humboldt Research Fellow, Alexander Von Humboldt Foundation.
- JILA Visiting Fellow (Joint Institute for Laboratory Astrophysics), Colorado, USA, 2004-2005.
