= Kapil Hari Paranjape =

Indian mathematician

Kapil Paranjape
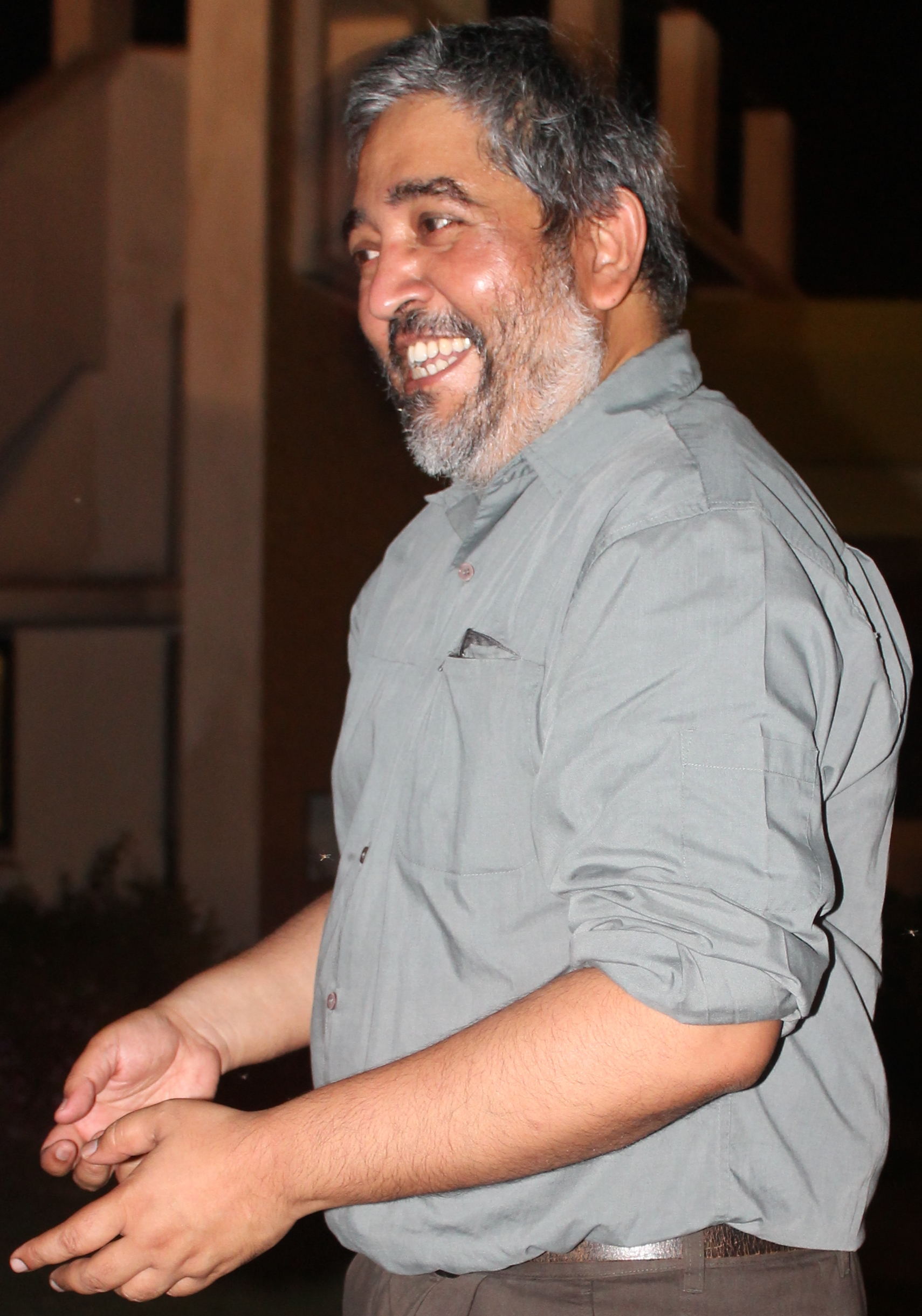
- Kapil at IISER Mohali Graduation Dinner(2013)
- Education: Indian Institute of Technology, Kanpur, University of Bombay
- Spouse: Sudeshna Sinha
- Awards: Shanti Swarup Bhatnagar Prize for Science and Technology
- Scientific career
- Fields: Algebraic geometry in mathematics
- Workplaces: Institute of Mathematical Sciences, Chennai, Indian Institute of Science Education and Research, Mohali
- Doctoral advisor: S. Ramanan

Kapil Hari Paranjape is an Indian mathematician specializing in algebraic geometry . He is Professor Emeritus of Mathematics at the Indian Institute of Science Education and Research, Mohali and Distinguished Professor at the Shiv Nadar Institution of Eminence

== Biography ==
He was born in Mumbai, Maharashtra near the Kabootar Khana in Dadar but grew up in New Delhi. He completed his schooling from the Sardar Patel Vidyalaya in 1977. He then joined the Indian Institute of Technology Kanpur where he pursued a five-years integrated Master’s programme in Mathematics and graduated in 1982. He was awarded the General Proficiency Prize for Mathematics from IIT Kanpur in 1982.

He joined the School of Mathematics, Tata Institute of Fundamental Research and was awarded his PhD in Mathematics in 1992.

Paranjape is also involved in the promotion of Linux and GNU and writes a blog titled Mast Kalandar.

== Career ==
He worked as a Reader at TIFR from 1993-1998. During this time he also held various visiting positions at the University of Chicago, University of Paris-Sud and University of Warwick. He was appointed as Professor at the Theoretical Statistics and Mathematics Unit of the Indian Statistical Institute, Bangalore. He moved to the Institute of Mathematical Sciences, Chennai in 1996. Between 2001 and 2009 he held visiting positions at the California Institute of Technology. Since 2009 he is a professor of Mathematics at the Indian Institute of Science Education and Research, Mohali. He was Clark Way Harrison Visiting Professor in Washington University in St. Louis in 2019. He also spent time at the Lodha Mathematical Sciences Institute in 2026.

== Awards and honors ==
He was awarded the Shanti Swarup Bhatnagar Prize for Science and Technology in 2005, the highest science award in India, in the mathematical sciences category. His citation read "Dr Paranjape has made outstanding contributions in the field of algebraic geometry, especially the theory of algebraic cycles. He has made highly significant contributions in connecting Hodge Theory to the study of Chow Groups. He has also established deep relations between Calabi-Yau varieties and modular forms". He is also a recipient of various other honors, among them are

- Fellowship of Indian Academy of Sciences Bangalore, 1997
- Fellowship of National Academy of Sciences, Allahabad, 1999
- Associate of the ICTP, Trieste, 1999-2001
- B. M. Birla award for young scientists, 1999
- DST Swarnajayanti (Golden Anniversary) Grant, 2001
- NBHM National Lecturer, India, 2004-2005
- Debian Developer, 2007
- Fellowship of Indian National Science Academy, New Delhi, 2009
- J C Bose National Fellowship, 2010
- Fellowship of The World Academy of Sciences (TWAS), 2019
