= Meera Nanda =

Indian philosopher and writer

- Born: 1954 (age 71–72); India
- Education: IIT Delhi (PhD); Rensselaer Polytechnic Institute (PhD)
- Occupations: Writer, academic

Meera Nanda (born 1954) is an Indian writer and historian of science, who has authored several works critiquing the influence of Hindutva, postcolonialism and postmodernism on science, and the flourishing of pseudoscience and vedic science. Meera Nanda taught History of Science at the Indian Institute of Science Education and Research (IISER) Mohali from 2009 to 2017, and later - from 2019 to 2020 - she was a Guest Faculty in Humanities and Social Sciences at IISER Pune. In 2023 she became a fellow with the Committee for Skeptical Inquiry.

== Life and career ==
Nanda was educated in science and philosophy with a PhD in biotechnology from the Indian Institute of Technology, Delhi, and a PhD in science studies from Rensselaer Polytechnic Institute.

She was a John Templeton Foundation Fellow in Religion and Science (2005–2007). In January 2009, she was a Fellow at the Jawaharlal Nehru Institute for Advanced Study, in the Jawaharlal Nehru University for research in Science, Post-Modernism and Culture. She was also a visiting faculty of history and philosophy of science at Indian Institute of Science Education and Research, Mohali from 2009 to 15 May 2017. She was a visiting faculty member of the department of Humanities and Social Sciences, IISER Pune in 2019 and 2020.

== Religion and Hindu nationalism ==
Nanda has authored several works on religion, most notably Prophets Facing Backward: Postmodern Critiques of Science and Hindu Nationalism in India (2004), and her 2009 book The God Market which examined how India is experiencing a rising tide of popular Hinduism, including government financing of Hinduism despite the nation's secular characteristic. The book was reviewed by William Dalrymple in Outlook Magazine.

== Works ==
- Postmodernism and Religious Fundamentalism: A Scientific Rebuttal To Hindu Science. New Delhi: Navayana. 2000. ISBN 81-89059-02-5
- Breaking the Spell of Dharma and Other Essays. New Delhi: Three Essays Collective, 2002. ISBN 81-88394-09-2.
- Prophets Facing Backward: Postmodern Critiques of Science and the Hindu Nationalism in India. New Brunswick: Rutgers University Press, 2004. ISBN 81-7824-090-4. Excerpts
- Wrongs of the Religious Right: Reflections on secularism, science and Hindutva. New Delhi: Three Essays Collective, 2005. ISBN 81-88789-30-5
- The God Market. Random House, 2010. ISBN 81-8400-095-2.
- Ayurveda Today : A Critical Look, with C. Viswanathan. Penguin, 2010. ISBN 9780143065128.
- Science in Saffron: Skeptical Essays on History of Science. New Delhi: Three Essays Collective, 2016. ISBN 978-93-83968-08-4.
- A Field Guide to Post-Truth India. New Delhi: Three Essays Collective, 2024. ISBN 978-93-83968-44-2.
