= Anu Sabhlok =

Indian architect and scholar

- Education: B.Arch. School of Planning and Architecture, New Delhi 1995 & Pennsylvania State University
- Alma mater: School of Planning and Architecture, New Delhi, Pennsylvania State University

Anu Sabhlok is an Indian architect, geographer and feminist scholar. Her main focus of work is on issues of identity and space in the context of a ‘developing world’. She earned a double Ph.D. in ‘Feminist Geography’ from Pennsylvania State University in 2007. Her doctoral work at Penn State focused on the role of women of the informal sector in construction(s) of identity amidst heightened nationalism and liberalisation of the economy in Gujarat, India.

== Education ==
Anu Sabhlok completed her bachelor's degree in architecture from the School of Planning and Architecture, New Delhi in 1995. She then went on to spend the next four years working in the field of architecture, with the last two years conducting research on policy. She graduated with an M.S. in architecture from Pennsylvania State University in 2001. In 2007, Anu received her dual Ph.D. in Geography and Women's Studies. Her doctoral work at Penn State focused on the role of women in the informal sector in construction(s) of identity amidst heightened nationalism and liberalization of the economy in Gujarat, India.

== Career ==
Sabhlok has been teaching as a Professor at Indian Institute of Science Education and Research, Mohali, since 2023 before that she worked as an Associate Professor(2016-2023) and as an Assistant Professor (2009-2016) in the same institute. Prior to this, she worked as an Assistant Professor at University of Louisville, Department of Geography and Geosciences for two years(2006-2009) . Sabhlok was also faculty at Pennsylvania State University, where she received her university education, from 1999 to 2002 and 2003–2006.

She has worked on three specific research projects:

- A feminist reading of the city of Chandigarh
- Constructing the Nation: An ethnographic account of migrant road builders at the Indo-Tibetan Border Roads
- SEWA in relief: Gendered Geographies of Disaster Relief in Gujarat, India (Doctoral work)

In 2002, she volunteered alongside and conducted ethnographic work on women relief workers in camps after the Hindu-Muslim riot. Her research area includes Postcolonial studies, feminist geography, Political-economy of contemporary India, Globalization, Identity (gender and nation), Participatory Action Research, Ethnography.

== Awards ==
Year	Award
2007 (co winner, as member geog. dept. Univ. of Louisville)	Paul Weber Award for excellence in teaching. Univ. of Louisville
2006	Faculty travel award for the study of women and global issues. Univ. of Louisville
2005	College of Liberal Arts Dissertation Research Award Association of American Geographers Dissertation Research Award; Society of Woman Geographers National Fellowship; E. Miller Award, second prize. Dept. of Geography. Pennsylvania State University; Institute of the Arts and Humanities Graduate Student Summer Residency, Pennsylvania State University
2003 (SWIG)	Excellence in educational outreach award. USG Pennsylvania State University
2001	Alma Heinz and August Louis Pohland Graduate Student Fellowship, School of Architecture and Landscape Architecture, Pennsylvania State University
1995 ( Co-winner)	Design ideas competition for revitalization of a traditional street in Jaipur, first prize. Rajasthan Tourism Development Corporation, India

== Publications ==
1. Brydon-Miller, M; Kral, M; Maguire, P; Noffke, S and Sabhlok, A. 2011. Jazz and the Banyan tree: Roots and Riffs in Participatory Action Research in Denzin, N (ed.) Handbook of Qualitative Research. Sage publications.
2. Sabhlok, A. 2010. Nationalism in relief. Geoforum. 41 (5): 743-751
3. Marshall, G and Sabhlok, A. 2009. “Not for the sake of work”: ultra-religious women's spatial negotiations in Turkey and India. Women Studies International Forum 32(6)
4. Sabhlok, A and Newton, J. Middle-East: Chapter 10. Address Earth, a large format atlas project. American Printing House for the Blind. (forthcoming)
5. Sabhlok, A. 2008. Integrated Disaster Management: an incentive for interstate cooperation amongst states in India. Man and Development: journal of the Center for Research in Rural and Industrial Development 30(4)
6. Sabhlok, A (as part of the 283 Collective). 2008. What's Just: Afterthoughts on the Summer Institute for the Geographies of Justice. Antipode 40(5)
7. Sabhlok, A. 2008. Book Review. Disaster Management in the wake of a flood. Punjab Geographer.
8. Sabhlok, A. 2005. Book review. Gender in the Hindu nation. Journal of international women’s studies 7(1)
9. Sabhlok, A. 2001. Chandigarh: A search for imageability within a modernist paradigm. Conference Documentation Set. International Making Cities Livable Council. California.
