= Debi Prasad Sarkar =

Indian biochemist and professor

- Born: 15 January 1958 (age 68); India
- Education: Banaras Hindu University; University of Calcutta
- Known for: Development of reconstituted Sendai viral envelopes
- Awards: 1998 Shanti Swarup Bhatnagar Prize; 2005 SBC M. Sreenivasaya Memorial Award
- Scientific career
- Fields: Immunology; Virology; Membrane Biology
- Workplaces: IISER Mohali; University of Delhi; University of Calcutta; National Cancer Institute

Debi Prasad Sarkar (born 15 January 1958) is an Indian biochemist, immunologist and virologist. Currently Prof Sarkar has been appointed (from 9 July 2024) as a Guest Professor in the Dept. of Biological Sciences and Engineering, IIT Gandhinagar, Palaj, Gujarat. Before joining IIT Gandhinagar, he worked as a visiting professor of chemistry, Ashoka University, Sonipat, Haryana. He was the head of biochemistry department and dean FIAS, at the University of Delhi South Campus and served as the Director of IISER Mohali from 2017 to 2019. He then resumed his professorship and subsequently promoted to the post of senior professor of biochemistry, with effect from 18 July 2019 at the parent institute, University of Delhi. Serving as joint director, DSSEED, IoE, University of Delhi. On the scientific front, he is renowned for his researches on Sendai virus and developing reconstituted viral envelopes. He is an elected fellow of Indian Academy of Sciences, National Academy of Sciences, India and Indian National Science Academy. The Council of Scientific and Industrial Research, the apex agency of the Government of India for scientific research, awarded him the Shanti Swarup Bhatnagar Prize for Science and Technology, one of the highest Indian Science Awards, in 1998, for his contributions to Biological Sciences. Received Excellence Teacher Award on service by the University of Delhi (99th Foundation Day Celebration of the University of Delhi on 11 September 2021).

== Biography ==
Debi Prasad Sarkar, born on 15 January 1958, graduated (Honors) in Chemistry in 1978 and obtained a master's degree in biochemistry in 1980 (secured highest marks and awarded BHU Gold Medal), both from Banaras Hindu University. His career started as a senior research fellow at the Biochemistry Department of University of Delhi South Campus in 1985, working on Liposomes as immunomodulators and drug delivery using Liposomes and he secured a PhD degree for his thesis, Immunogenicity of carbohydrate determinants mediated through Liposomes: Liposome-mediated drug delivery from the Calcutta University in 1986. His post-doctoral studies were at the National Cancer Institute of the National Institutes of Health where he spent two years (1986–88) as visiting fellow and returned to Delhi University to take up the position of a lecturer of biochemistry (1988). He stayed at the university for the rest of his academic career, holding various positions as the senior lecturer (1993–96) and reader (1996–2002), superannuated as a senior professor in January 2023.

== Legacy ==
Sarkar's researches on Sendai virus is known to have resulted in the development of reconstituted viral envelopes containing only the fusion protein and this is reported to have assisted in a more efficient gene delivery in therapeutic use. Along with Vijay Kumar, he demonstrated for the first time that HBx protein stimulated Mitogen-activated signaling cascades in living animals. He continued his researches while working as an academic and holds patents for his inventions. Some of the inventions have resulted in Patent Cooperation Treaties (PCT) earning royalties for the university. He has also participated in clinical trials on behalf of the university, including a preclinical study with a Gunn rat model, in collaboration with National Research Development Corporation and AECOM. He has published his research findings in a number of articles (Note: Please see Selected bibliography section) and has delivered featured lectures on his work. He has also delivered several award orations including the Prof. B.K. Bachhawat Memorial Lecture of the National Academy of Sciences, India in 2011 and the Platinum Jubilee Lecture at the 102nd edition of the Indian Science Congress in 2015.

== Awards and honors ==
The Council of Scientific and Industrial Research awarded him the Shanti Swarup Bhatnagar Prize, one of the highest Indian science awards, in 1998. He received the M. Sreenivasaya Memorial Award of the Society of Biological Chemists (India) in 2005 and the J. C. Bose National Fellowship in 2010. The National Academy of Sciences, India elected him as their fellow in 1996 and the Indian Academy of Sciences and the Indian National Science Academy followed suit in 2007 and 2011 respectively. Received "Excellence Award for Teachers in service in University of Delhi" on 11 September 2021 in a function to celebrate 99th Foundation Day of University of Delhi from the Chief Guests Shri Amit Khare, Secretary, MoE, GOI and Shri Imtiaz Ali, renowned film director and producer.

== Selected bibliography ==
- Debi P Sarkar; Stephen J Morris; Ofer Eidelman; Joshua Zimmerberg; Robert Blumenthal (July 1989). "Initial stages of influenza hemagglutinin-induced cell fusion monitored simultaneously by two fluorescent events: cytoplasmic continuity and lipid mixing". Journal of Cell Biology. 109 (1): 113–122. doi:10.1083/jcb.109.1.113. PMC 2115478. PMID 2745545.
- Membrane Fusion Technique. Gulf Professional Publishing. July 1993. p. 42. ISBN 978-0-12-182122-7.
- Robert Blumenthal; Debi P Sarkar; Stewart Durell; Daniel E Howard; Stephen J Morris (October 1996). "Dilation of the influenza hemagglutinin fusion pore revealed by the kinetics of individual cell-cell fusion events". Journal of Cell Biology. 135 (1): 63–71. doi:10.1083/jcb.135.1.63. PMC 2121025. PMID 8858163.
- Komal Ramani; Roop S Bora; Mukesh Kumar; Sandeep K Tyagi; Debi P Sarkar (March 1997). "Novel gene delivery to liver cells using engineered virosomes". FEBS Letters. 404 (2–3): 164–168. Bibcode:1997FEBSL.404..164R. doi:10.1016/s0014-5793(97)00120-8. PMID 9119056.
- Siddhartha S Jana; Dhruba J Bharali; Prashant Mani; Amarnath Maitra; Chhitar M Gupta; Debi P Sarkar (March 2002). "Targeted cytosolic delivery of hydrogel nanoparticles into HepG2 cells through engineered Sendai viral envelopes". FEBS Letters. 515 (1–3): 184–188. Bibcode:2002FEBSL.515..184J. doi:10.1016/s0014-5793(02)02467-5. PMID 11943218.
- Debi P Sarkar; Komal Ramani; Sandeep K Tyagi (2002). "Targeted Gene Delivery by Virosomes". Liposome Methods and Protocols: 163–173.
- Indu Kohaar; Showket Hussain; Nisha Thakur; Pratibha Tiwari; Vilas Nasare; Swaraj Batra; Veena Singh; Suresh Bhambani; Bhudev C Das; Debi P Sarkar; Mausumi Bharadwaj (April 2009). "Association between human leukocyte antigen class II alleles and human papillomavirus-mediated cervical cancer in Indian women". Human Immunology. 70 (4): 222–229. doi:10.1016/j.humimm.2009.01.003. PMID 19272325.
- Sunandini Chandra; Raju Kalaivani; Manoj Kumar; Narayanaswamy Srinivasan; Debi P. Sarkar (October 2017). "Sendai virus recruits cellular villin to remodel actin cytoskeleton during fusion with hepatocytes". Mol. Biol. Cell. 28 (26): 3801–3814. doi:10.1091/mbc.E17-06-0400. PMC 5739296. PMID 29074568.

== See also ==
- Viral envelope
