= Somdatta Sinha =

- Born: 1951 (age 74–75)
- Education: Visva-Bharati University, Jawaharlal Nehru University
- Scientific career
- Fields: Theoretical Biology
- Workplaces: IISER Mohali, Center for Cellular and Molecular Biology

Somdatta Sinha (born 1951) is an Indian researcher and professor of biology, who is one of the earliest to start working in the area of theoretical biology in India. Her expertise is in the interdisciplinary fields of mathematical & computational biology, nonlinear dynamics and complex systems with a view to understand the logic and design of biological processes. She studies spatio-temporal organization in biological systems – from biological sequences to spread of disease in populations – using mathematical and computational methods. She has played a central role in the development of mathematical and computational biology in her country through research, organization of scientific meetings, training programs, conferences, and teaching interdisciplinary courses at the undergraduate and postgraduate levels. Her research encompasses patterns, interactions, and dynamics of biological systems using mathematical and physical methods to understand complex multi-scale biological systems. Sinha's research contributions focus on modelling a variety of biological systems, such as, circadian rhythms, pattern formation, biochemical pathways, synthetic biology, single and meta-population ecological models, epidemiology, and controlling spatiotemporal dynamics. She has also carried out computational analysis of genomes for classification of organisms using Chaos Game Representation (CGR) and Multi-fractal analysis, protein structure function analysis using graph theory, and network analysis of large biochemical pathways. Her publications have made important contributions in the respective fields and are highly cited. Her seminal contribution to the development of the interdisciplinary field of Mathematical and Computational Biology in India was acknowledged by the Department of Biotechnology, Govt of India with the National Senior Woman Bioscientist Award (for life time contribution) in 2013 and the J C Bose National Fellowship from the Department of Science and Technology, Govt. of India. She is a fellow of the Indian National Science Academy, Indian Academy of Sciences and National Academy of Sciences. She was elected Fellow of the Wissenschaftskolleg zu Berlin (Institute of Advanced Study at Berlin, Germany) for 2000-2001 and International Visiting Research Scholar at the Peter Wall Institute for Advanced Studies at the University of British Columbia, Vancouver, Canada in 2018. She has traveled widely across the globe and has given many invitational talks in universities and conferences.

She did her school and university (B.Sc. and M.Sc. in physics) from Visva Bharati University and M.Phil. and Ph.D. in theoretical biology from Jawaharlal Nehru University, New Delhi (1982). She worked as a scientist at the Center for Cellular and Molecular Biology, Hyderabad, from 1983 to 2011. She then was appointed a full professor and later a visiting professor at Indian Institute of Science Education and Research Mohali (IISER Mohali) from 2011 to 2016 and 2016 to 2019. Currently she is the INSA Honorary Senior Scientist at IISER Kolkata, She has been a visiting professor at the Ashoka University, Sonepat., at the Centre for DNA Fingerprinting & Diagnostics (CDFD), and at the Mathematics Department of the University of British Columbia at Vancouver, Canada. She has written many popular science articles in journals and magazines in both English and Bengali, and has co-authored NCERT science text books. In 2024 she was awarded the Sanmarg Aparajita Life time Achievement Jury Award for being a pioneering researcher in theoretical biology in India.
