= Narayanasami Sathyamurthy =

Indian chemist

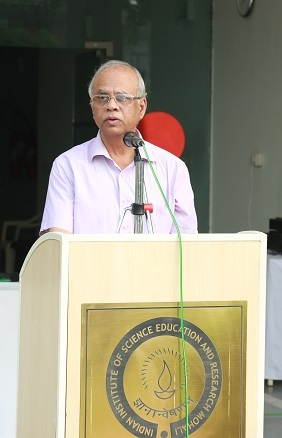
- Born: July 10, 1951 (age 75); Sethur, Puducherry, India
- Education: Annamalai University; Oklahoma State University
- Occupation: Chemist
- Organization(s): IISER Mohali; IIT Kanpur

Narayansami Sathyamurthy (born July 10, 1951) is an Indian chemist. He is the founding director of the Indian Institute of Science Education and Research (IISER), Mohali, Punjab, India and the President of Chemical Research Society of India.

== Education ==
Sathyamurthy completed his B.Sc. and M.Sc. degrees from Annamalai University. Sathyamurthy moved to the United States where he obtained his Ph.D degree working with L.M. Raff at Oklahoma State University in 1975. He further carried out postdoctoral research in Nobel laureate J.C. Polanyi's laboratory. After that Sathyamurthy joined the Indian Institute of Technology Kanpur as a lecturer in 1978. Sathyamurthy became a professor in 1985.

== Contribution to Chemical Science ==
Sathyamurthy has contributed in the field of Theoretical chemistry, Molecular reaction dynamics, and Computational chemistry. He and his group have made notable contributions on the sensitivity of molecular reaction dynamics, accuracy of the potential energy surface, effect of reagent rotation, vibration and orientation on reaction cross section, chaos and fractals in chemical dynamics, reactive scattering resonances in atom-molecule collisions, transition state spectrum, isotope effect on Raman excitation profiles, channel control in chemical reactions, vibration mediated photodissociation, structure and stability of water clusters, water molecules in a confined environment, blue shift in stretching frequency of molecules in a confined environment, host–guest interaction in endohedral fullerenes, stacking and spreading interaction in N-heteroaromatic systems, intra- and inter- molecular hydrogen bond, and atomic and molecular clusters as designer materials for the nanoworld.

== Awards and honours ==
- Young Scientist Medal, Indian National Science Academy, New Delhi 1980
- Rev. Yedanapalli Memorial Award, Indian Chemical Society 1989
- S. S. Bhatnagar Prize in Chemical Sciences, Council of Scientific & Industrial Research, New Delhi 1990
- Fellow, Indian Academy of Sciences, Bangalore 1990
- Fellow, Indian National Science Academy, New Delhi 1992
- Sir C. V. Raman Award, Hari Om Ashram Trust, University Grants Commission, New Delhi 1997
- FICCI Award, New Delhi 2001
- Silver Medal, Chemical Research Society of India, Bangalore 2001
- Professor Navneetha Rao Best Teacher Award, Andhra Pradesh Academy of Sciences, Hyderabad 2003
- Fellow, Third World Academy of Sciences, Trieste, Italy 2005
- J. C. Bose National Fellow, Department of Science and Technology, New Delhi, 2006
- Founding Director, Indian Institute of Science Education and Research, Mohali, 2007-2017
