= Sudeshna Sinha =

Indian physicist

- Education: IIT Kanpur, TIFR
- Spouse: Kapil Hari Paranjape
- Children: Shruti Paranjape
- Awards: B M Birla Award
- Scientific career
- Fields: Non-linear Physics
- Workplaces: Institute of Mathematical Sciences, Chennai, Indian Institute of Science Education and Research, Mohali

Sudeshna Sinha is a professor at the Indian Institute of Science Education and Research, Mohali. She was at the Institute of Mathematical Sciences, Chennai, for over a decade. She works in the field of nonlinear physics. Her work on 'chaos-based' hardware (so-called "Chaos computing") is being developed commercially by the US-based company Chaologix. Chaologix has now been acquired by ARM (Cambridge, England).

== Personal life ==
Sinha is married to Kapil Hari Paranjape, who is a professor of mathematics at the Indian Institute of Science Education and Research, Mohali. Her maternal grandfather was Dr. Prabodh Chandra Bagchi, formerly the vice-chancellor of Viswa Bharati University and historian.

== Education ==
Sinha holds a Master of Science (Five Years Integrated Programme in Chemistry) from the Indian Institute of Technology, Kanpur, in 1985. She completed her Ph.D. from the Tata Institute of Fundamental Research, Mumbai, in 1990.

== Career & publications ==
Sinha is currently a professor at the Indian Institute of Science Education and Research, Mohali and works in the field of nonlinear physics. Her research areas include nonlinear dynamics, chaos, complex systems, networks, and computation. She is an editor of the AIP journal Chaos: An Interdisciplinary Journal of Nonlinear Science and associate editor of Communications in Nonlinear Science and Numerical Simulation (Elsevier). She is also on the editorial boards of Proceedings of the Royal Society A: Mathematical, Physical and Engineering Sciences (Royal Society, UK), Pramana - Journal of Physics and Indian Journal of Physics.

== Awards ==
- Elected Fellow of the World Academy of Sciences, 2018.
- J. C. Bose National Fellowship (2016-2020; renewed 2021-2025).
- Elected Fellow of the Indian National Science Academy, New Delhi in 2014.
- Elected Fellow of the Indian Academy of Sciences, Bangalore in 2010.
- Awarded the B. M. Birla Prize for Physics in 1998 : The B M Birla prizes are awarded to Indian scientists below the age of 40 who have made outstanding original contributions in their fields.
- Associate Member of the International Centre for Theoretical Physics, Trieste, Italy during 1995-2000
- General Proficiency Prize from the Indian Institute of Technology, Kanpur (1985): Awarded to the "Best Outgoing Student in the master's degree (five years integrated programme in Physics) for the year"
- National Talent Search Scholarship, during 1978-1985
