= Kausik Chattopadhyay =

Biologist

- Born: West Bengal, India
- Education: University of Calcutta; Albert Einstein College of Medicine
- Known for: Studies on the Pore-forming protein toxins and T-cell costimulatory molecules
- Awards: 2014 N-BIOS Prize
- Scientific career
- Fields: Structural biology; Immunobiology
- Workplaces: Indian Institute of Science Education and Research, Mohali

Kausik Chattopadhyay is an Indian structural biologist, protein biologist, and a professor at the Department of Biological Sciences. He was the Dean of R&D at the Indian Institute of Science Education and Research, Mohali until May 2021. He is known for his studies on the Pore-forming protein toxins and T-cell costimulatory molecules. The Department of Biotechnology of the Government of India awarded him the National Bioscience Award for Career Development, one of the highest Indian science awards, for his contributions to biosciences, in 2014.

== Biography ==
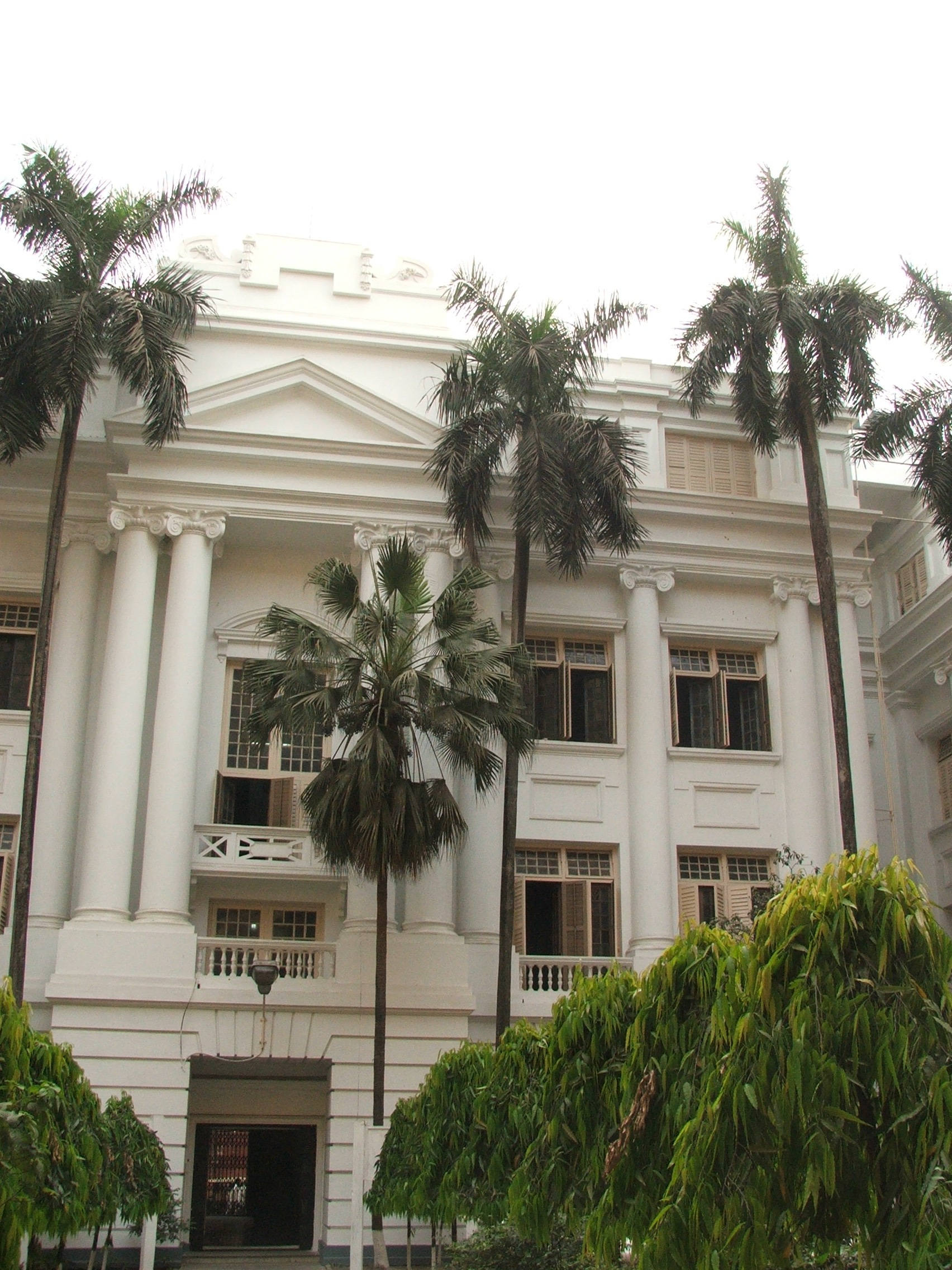
University of Calcutta

Kausik Chattopadhyay, born in the Indian state of West Bengal, secured his honours degree from the University of Calcutta in 1996 and continued there to complete his master's studies in 1998. His doctoral research was in biochemistry which earned him a PhD from the University of Calcutta in 2003 after which he did his post-doctoral studies at Albert Einstein College of Medicine. On his return to India in 2009, he joined the Indian Institute of Science Education and Research, Mohali (IISER) where he serves as a professor at the Department of Biological Sciences. At IISER, he heads the Cytolysin Study Group as its principal investigator.

== Professional profile ==
Chattopadhyay's research focus is on the structural studies of pore-forming toxins and their host-pathogen interaction from an immunobiological perspective. His group also studies the structure and functions of T-cell costimulatory molecules. His studies have been documented by way of a number of articles (Note: Please see Selected bibliography section) and ResearchGate, an online repository of scientific articles has listed 29 of them. Besides, he has contributed chapters to books published by others. He was also a member of the advisory committee of the 6th International Library and Information Professional Summit (LIPS 2017) held at Mohali in April 2017.

== Awards and honors ==
The Department of Biotechnology (DBT) of the Government of India awarded him the National Bioscience Award for Career Development, one of the highest Indian science awards in 2014. He received the Prof. B.K. Bachhawat Memorial Young Scientist Award of the National Academy of Sciences, India in 2015.

== Selected bibliography ==
=== Chapters ===
- Abhijit Chakrabarti; Avadhesha Surolia (18 November 2014). Biochemical Roles of Eukaryotic Cell Surface Macromolecules. Springer. pp. 109–. ISBN 978-3-319-11280-0.

=== Articles ===
- Kathuria, Reema; Chattopadhyay, Kausik (2018-02-22). "Vibrio cholerae cytolysin: Multiple facets of the membrane interaction mechanism of a β-barrel pore-forming toxin". IUBMB Life. 70 (4): 260–266. doi:10.1002/iub.1725. PMID 29469977.
- Kundu, Nidhi; Tichkule, Swapnil; Pandit, Shashi Bhushan; Chattopadhyay, Kausik (2017-01-15). "Disulphide bond restrains the C-terminal region of thermostable direct hemolysin during folding to promote oligomerization". Biochemical Journal. 474 (2): 317–331. doi:10.1042/BCJ20160728. PMID 27784764.
- Rai, Anand Kumar; Chattopadhyay, Kausik (2016). "Revisiting the oligomerization mechanism of Vibrio cholerae cytolysin, a beta-barrel pore-forming toxin". Biochemical and Biophysical Research Communications. 474 (3): 421–427. doi:10.1016/j.bbrc.2016.05.006. PMID 27150630.

== See also ==
- Cytolysin
- Oligomer
