= Vijay Kumar (molecular biologist) =

Indian virologist

- Born: 7 November 1954 (age 72); Sasaram, Bihar, India
- Education: Tilka Manjhi Bhagalpur University; Magadh University; AIIMS Delhi; Louis Pasteur University
- Known for: Studies on reproductive immunology
- Awards: 1997 Shanti Swarup Bhatnagar Prize
- Scientific career
- Fields: Molecular biology
- Workplaces: AIIMS Delhi; International Centre for Genetic Engineering and Biotechnology

Vijay Kumar (born 7 November 1954) is an Indian molecular biologist, virologist, and an honorary scientist at the International Centre for Genetic Engineering and Biotechnology.

Known for his research in hepatology, Kumar is an elected fellow of National Academy of Sciences, India, National Academy of Medical Sciences, and National Academy of Agricultural Sciences, as well as a J. C. Bose National Fellow of the Department of Biotechnology. The Council of Scientific and Industrial Research, the apex agency of the Government of India for scientific research, awarded him the Shanti Swarup Bhatnagar Prize for Science and Technology, one of the highest Indian science awards, for his contributions to Medical Sciences in 1997. (Note: Long link – please select award year to see details)

== Biography ==
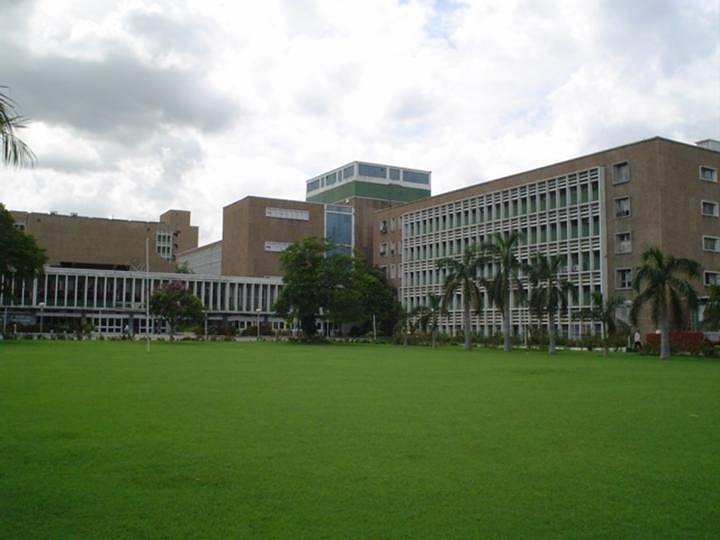
AIIMS Delhi

Vijay Kumar was born on 7 November 1954 at Sasaram, a place known for its quarries, in Rohtas district in the Indian state of Bihar. His early college education was at Sahibganj College of Tilka Manjhi Bhagalpur University where he completed his BSc (Hons) in zoology in 1972. He also earned an MSc from Magadh University in 1975. Subsequently, Kumar joined the All India Institute of Medical Sciences, Delhi as a junior research fellow and continued there for his doctoral studies as a Lady Tata Senior Research Scholar to secure a PhD in 1984 for his thesis, Molecular interactions of progesterone with its receptor in human uterus.

Kumar also started his career in 1984 by joining the All India Institutes of Medical Sciences (AIIMS) faculty as a junior research officer at the department of biophysics. However, he took a sabbatical to move to Institut de Chimie Biologique, Strasbourg as an exchange scholar of Louis Pasteur University and did his post-doctoral studies till 1988.

Returning to India, Kumar joined International Centre for Genetic Engineering and Biotechnology (ICGEB), New Delhi as a research scientist, where he served out his regular career till his superannuation in 2014. During this period, he held various positions such as senior research scientist (1998–2001), staff research scientist (2002–13), staff scientist (2013–14), and he headed the Virology Group from 2013 to 2014. Post-retirement, he continues his association with ICGEB as an emeritus scientist and as J. C. Bose National Fellow.

== Legacy ==
The genome organisation of HBV; the genes overlap. ORF X, in yellow, encodes HBx.

Vijay Kumar focused his research on the assembly, cloning, and expression of genes and on the role played by steroid hormone receptors and oncogenic viruses in producing cancer cells. He has done pioneering research on Hepatitis B virus, and his studies widened the understanding of the trans-activating domain of the HBx protein.

Kumar also contributed in developing a protocol for assembling multiepitope protein gene which assisted in the studies of the immunobiology of the virus. His research collaboration with Debi Prasad Sarkar assisted him to demonstrate for the first time that HBx protein stimulated Mitogen-activated signaling cascades in vivo. His research has been documented and cited in texts and articles, and he has contributed chapters to books published by others.

Kumar is a member of the Institutional Ethics Review Board (IERB-JNU) of the Jawaharlal Nehru University and was a member of the Advisory Committee for Shanti Swarup Bhatnagar Prize for the years 2005, 2011, and 2014. He served as a principal investigator for a number of projects by Department of Science and Technology and Department of Biotechnology. The invited lectures or key note addresses delivered by him include the presentation on Epigenetic control of origin licensing during mammalian DNA replication at the Indian Science Congress of 2012, among others.

== Awards and honors ==
Kumar won a number of prizes during his academic studies, which included the Kul Prize for Best Science graduate of Bhagalpur University (1972), DPI Merit Scholarship during 1973–75, and the Gold Medal of Magadh University in 1977 for standing first in MSc examination. The Council of Scientific and Industrial Research awarded him Shanti Swarup Bhatnagar Prize, one of the highest Indian science awards in 1997.

The list of research fellowships held by him includes Lady Tata Senior Research Scholarship of Lady Tata Memorial Trust (1982–84), Indo-French Scientific and Cultural Exchange Fellowship (1984–85), and the J. C. Bose National Fellowship of the Department of Biotechnology in 2013. He received the Gold Medal of the Zoological Society of India in 1998. In 2002, he was elected as a fellow by the National Academy of Sciences, India. The National Academy of Agricultural Sciences elected him as a fellow in 2004, and he became a fellow of the National Academy of Medical Sciences in 2013. The award orations delivered by him include the 2013 Ramniklal J. Kinarivala Oration Award of Gujarat Cancer Society.

== See also ==
- Epitope mapping
- Viral protein
