= CEBS =

CEBS may stand for:

- Committee of European Banking Supervisors, a former independent advisory group on banking supervision in the European Union
- Chitwan English Boarding School, a school in the Chitwan District, Nepal
- Centre for Excellence in Basic Sciences, an institute in Mumbai, India.
