= Vocational education in India =

Vocational education is that form of instruction designed to prepare people for industrial or commercial employment. It can be acquired either formally in trade schools, technical secondary schools, or in on-the-job training programs or, more informally, by picking up the necessary skills on the job.

Combined with the fact that India has been ranked the 5th largest economy in the world, the latest survey of unemployment in India 2021–2022 shows the unemployment rate as 6.40%. The economic times revealed that labour market shrunk by 2.1 million in 2022.

Employers requiring skilled workers and the employment-seeking population face issues like lower wages, poor working condition which puts India in a unique position. A labour/skill shortage for industry survey by FICCI (Federation of Indian Chambers of Commerce) found that 90% of companies face a labour shortage. 89% of companies said that the demand for the product is not met due to labour shortages in the market. The research paper India's dream run and its aftermath shows that India did see an economic boom from 2003 to 2008 referred to as the dream run but not in the manufacturing sector, which made it difficult to provide jobs to unskilled and semi-skilled populations. This problem is aggravated due to a lack of skill development programs to bridge the labour demand and supply gap.

== Courses By CBSE ==
The Central Board of Secondary Education (CBSE) in India has included following vocational subjects in their senior secondary education: diploma, industrial training Institute

Commerce based:

1. Office Secretaryship
2. Stenography and Computer Applications
3. Accountancy and Auditing
4. Marketing and Salesmanship
5. Banking
6. Retail
7. Financial Market Management
8. Business Administration

Engineering based:

1. Electrical Technology
2. Automobile Technology
3. Civil Engineering
4. Air Conditioning and Refrigeration Technology
5. Electronics Technology
6. Geospatial Technology
7. Foundry
8. IT Application

Health and Para Medical based:

1. Ophthalmic Techniques
2. Medical Laboratory Techniques
3. Auxiliary Nursing & Midwifery
4. X-Ray Technician
5. Healthcare Sciences
6. Health and Beauty Studies
7. Medical Diagnostics

Home Science based:

1. Fashion Design & Clothing Construction
2. Textile Design
3. Design Fundamental
4. Music Technical Production
5. Beauty Services

Others:

1. Transportation System & Logistic Management
2. Life Insurance
3. Library and Information Sciences

Agriculture based:

1. Poultry Farming
2. Horticulture
3. Dairying Science and Technology

Hospitality and Tourism based:

1. Food Production
2. Food and Beverage Services
3. Mass Media Studies and Media Production
4. Bakery and Confectionery
5. Front office
6. Travel and Tourism

== Courses offered by Government of India ==
1. Udaan
2. Polytechnics
3. Parvaaz
4. National Rural Livelihood Mission
5. Industrial Training Institutes
6. Aajeevika mission of national rural livelihood
7. Craftsmen Training Scheme
8. diploma

== Challenges to Implement VET in India ==
The challenges for the growth of vocational training such as traditional and cultural bias against non-white collar jobs. The lack of mechanism at the state level to work towards vocational education and training have been observed in the research paper.

The UGC and other bodies do not recognize vocational courses offered by the private institution leading to the low uptake of Vocational courses. The paper also mentioned an unemployment rate of 11% in VET courses.

== Initiatives by Government ==
After the National Skills Development Policy in 2009, the government created National Skills Coordination Board, the National Skill Development Corporation, and National Skills Qualification Framework. There was a commitment made by the Minister of Finance to inject Rs.1000 crore into the system structure.

Sector Skills Councils was established under NSDC, aiming to involve industry in training and labour force growth, set occupational standards, and accredit qualification. The creation of NSQF includes academic, vocational, and technical qualifications. It aims to facilitate the recognition of prior learning and improvement between the levels and types of education.

=== Schemes by Government ===
- In 2014, the National Skill Certification and Monetary Reward Scheme provided an average monetary incentive of ₹10,000 for completing certain training programs. The scheme aimed to upskill one million youth by offering industry-relevant training.
- In 2015, the Pradhan Mantri Kaushal Vikas Yojana scheme was launched to provide skills to 2.4 million people. Out of the 2.4 million people, a million were registered under the Recognition of Prior Learning Framework.
- The Modular Employable Skills scheme focused on providing short-term training in high-demand sectors and industries. Under the scheme, training costs are reimbursed after successful certification, motivating enrollment and completion. To encourage inclusive participation, women from disadvantaged communities are offered financial subsidies.

== Impact of VET on Economy ==
The Institute of Applied Manpower Research argued that 291 million additional workers are required in 2022–2023. The government attempted to increase the VET in the country to upskill 500 million workers to reduce the gap.

A research article on vocational educational and training in India found that 11% of 15–29 years old who had received vocational education and training are unemployed. This trend is slowly reversing but still exists.

A study from the International Labour Organization shows that apprenticeships have the potential to contribute to the economy. It said that small businesses found the increased earnings associated with training outweighed the associated cost.

The NPSD recognized the informal sector's potential as a significant part of the economy.

== Sources ==
- CBSE Vocational Courses
