= Anil Kumar Tripathi (academician) =

Indian scientist and professor

- Born: 7 November 1959 (age 66); Mirzapur
- Education: Bachelor of Science Botany, BHU,(1978) Master of Science Botany, BHU,(1980) Doctor of Philosophy Botany, BHU, (1984)
- Alma mater: Banaras Hindu University
- Occupation: Academician
- Awards: FNA, FASc
- Scientific career
- Workplaces: Banaras Hindu University; IISER Mohali; CSIR-CIMAP; DDU University Gorakhpur
- Thesis: (1984)

Anil Kumar Tripathi (born 1959) is an Indian academician, and senior professor of biotechnology at the Banaras Hindu University. He has been director of Indian Institute of Science Education and Research, Mohali since April 2024. Previously, he has been the first director of the Institute of Science, Banaras Hindu University. Prior to that, he also served as the Director of CSIR-CIMAP and the first mission director of CSIR’s Aroma Mission.

== Biography ==
Tripathi was born in 1959 in Mirzapur, Uttar Pradesh. He had his education from schooling to PhD in Varanasi, where he did his schooling up to high school from the Queens College. He graduated with B.Sc in 1978, M.Sc in 1980, and PhD in 1984 from the Banaras Hindu University. He then joined as a lecturer at Deen Dayal Upadhyay Gorakhpur University. Later, he went to Germany for his Postdoctoral research (1988-1990) at University of Bayreuth before returning back to India and start his teaching career at Banaras Hindu University.

He has taught for over 40 years, primarily at Banaras Hindu University (since 1990), but also at Deen Dayal Upadhyay Gorakhpur University.

Tripathi is a J C Bose Fellow, and holds fellowships in various science academies such as National Academy of Agricultural Sciences, Indian Academy of Sciences, Indian National Science Academy, and National Academy of Sciences India.

Apart from the IISER & BHU, he has also served as the director of Central Institute of Medicinal and Aromatic Plants from 2014 to 2019.
