= Institute of Science, Banaras Hindu University =

Constituent institute

- Seal of the institute
- Other names: ISc-BHU
- Motto: Science is Service
- Type: Public
- Established: 1916
- Parent institution: Banaras Hindu University
- Affiliations: UGC
- Dean: Satyanshu Kumar Upadhyay
- Director: Sanjay Kumar
- Location: Varanasi, Uttar Pradesh, India; 25°16′06″N 82°59′34″E
- Website: Official website

Institute of Science, Banaras Hindu University (ISc-BHU) is a constituent institute of Banaras Hindu University, Varanasi, India which offers courses in zoology, botany, biochemistry, biotechnology, computer science, geography, mathematics, physics, geology, geophysics, molecular and human genetics, chemistry, home science and statistics.

== History ==
Faculty of Science was established in 1916, when a series of lectures were delivered by Nobel laureate C. V. Raman at the Department of Physics. In the month of December 2015, it was upgraded to Institute of Science and Prof. Anil Kumar Tripathi appointed as its first Director.

== Organization ==
Institute of Science's administrative head is the director. The director is responsible for all aspects of the Institute's operations, including budgets, administration, planning, support services, institute appointments, curricula and student affairs. The director is appointed by an executive body and reports to the vice-chancellor of the university. The Institute of Science keeps itself alive with regular academic activities like seminars, workshops, conferences. It is equipped with advanced and sophisticated laboratories. Faculty members have liaison with research institutions of repute in India and abroad. A large number of the teachers of the Institute have received distinctions and honors like Shanti Swarup Bhatnagar Prize, Jawaharlal Nehru Fellowship, FICCI Award, TIFR Fellowship etc. and several are fellows of the various academies. The Institute is currently headed at the director level by Sanjay Kumar, and previously by Anil Kumar Tripathi. Satyanshu Kumar Upadhyay is the Dean of the Faculty of Science.

There are six Centers and thirteen different Departments of which many are centres of advanced study and research in the Institute of Science that offer Undergraduate (UG), Postgraduate (PG) and Doctoral Degrees in all the field of modern science.

=== Courses ===
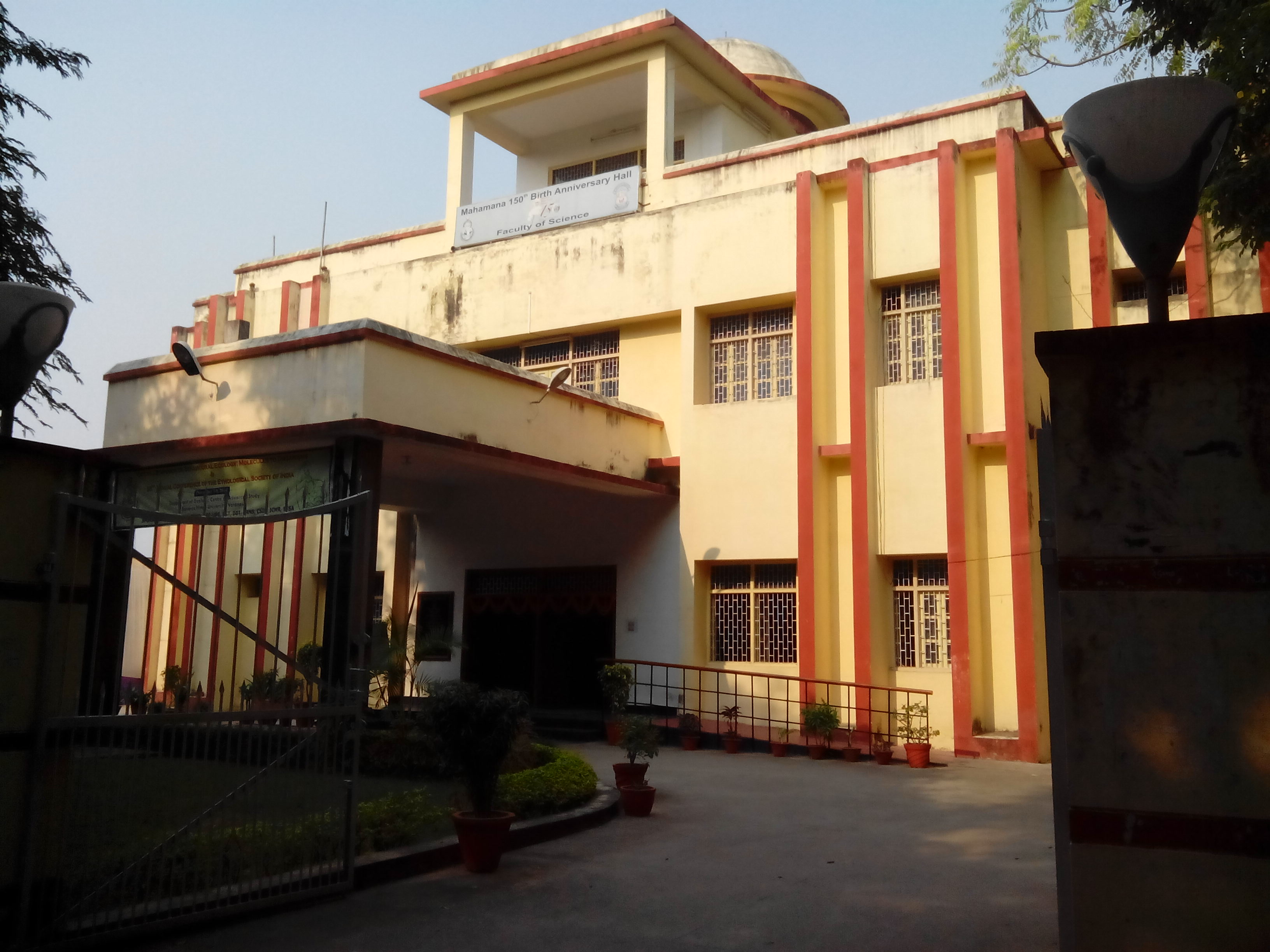
Institute of Science Seminar Complex

The institute offers undergraduate (B.Sc), post graduate (M.Sc), and Ph.D courses in various courses under the departments and centres in the institute. It also offers M.Sc. (Tech.) in Geophysics and MCA courses (which is offered at both the Department of Computer Science and RGSC, BHU).

=== Research Centres ===
- Centre for Brain Research
- Centre for Genetic Disorders
- Centre for Hydrogen Energy
- Centre for Nanotechnology
- DST - Centre for Interdisciplinary Mathematical Sciences
- Interdisciplinary Centre for Life Sciences (a.k.a. DBT-BHU Interdisciplinary School of Life Sciences)
- Seismic Imaging Centre

== Journal of Scientific Research of the Banaras Hindu University ==
Journal of Scientific Research of the Banaras Hindu University
- Discipline: Science
- Language: English
- Edited by: Director and dean of the Institute of Science

Publication details
- History: 1957–present
- Publisher: Banaras Hindu University Press (India)
- Frequency: Quarterly
- Open access: Yes

Standard abbreviations
- ISO 4: J. Sci. Res. Banaras Hindu Univ.

Indexing
- ISSN: 0447-9483
- LCCN: 2010219021
- OCLC no.: 879686832

Links
- Journal homepage; Online archive

The Journal of Scientific Research of the Banaras Hindu University is an open-access scientific journal. It is published since 1950 by the Institute of Science and is double-blind peer reviewed.

== Notable alumni ==
- C. N. R. Rao
- Jagdish Shukla
- Jayant Narlikar
- Kamalesh Chandra Chakrabarty
- Lalji Singh
- Satish K. Tripathi
- Shanti Swaroop Bhatnagar
- T. V. Ramakrishnan

== See also ==
- Banaras Hindu University
- List of educational institutions in Varanasi
