= Karavaan =

- Status: Active
- Genre: Scientific, social and cultural fest
- Frequency: Annual
- Venue: IISER Pune campus
- Location: Pune
- Country: India
- Website: www.karavaan.org

Karavaan (Hindi: कारवाँ; English meaning: Caravan) is the annual socio-cultural science fest of the Indian Institute of Science Education and Research, Pune. The name stems from the notion of all IISERs moving forward as one. The fest attracts students from colleges all across Pune, as well as national institutes all over India. It is a 3-day fest, held either in October or November in the Fall semester every year.

== About Karavaan ==
With its humble origins as a small intra-college fest in 2008, Karavaan has grown by leaps and bounds to become a major presence in Pune. Funded partly by IISER Pune and partly by a number of associated sponsors, it now attracts both local, upcoming performers and artists of national repute. There are various competitions held over the Karavaan weekend with participation by students from colleges all over the city, as well as by major institutes across the country.

== Events ==
Karavaan hosts several events and competitions over an entire weekend in the Fall semester. The cultural clubs of IISER Pune, viz. the Music, Dance, Drama, Art, Literary, and Quiz clubs conduct a number of competitions in their respective domains. These typically span the entire daytime during the Karavaan weekend. The whole campus is decorated to display that year’s Karavaan theme. There are also several games and activities like laser-tag, bull-rider, darts and Karaoke stalls.

=== Pre-Karavaan Events ===
There are several events held right from the start of the Fall semester that gradually set the stage for Karavaan. Events like animal rescue sessions, blood donation camps and various clean-up drives in Pashan are organized in an attempt to address various social issues. Quizzes and drama competitions start a week or two before the fest.

=== Daytime events ===
Throughout the Karavaan weekend, several cultural and science-related activities are organized every year, including:

Science Stand-up Comedy: Participants perform stand-up comic acts that refer to science-related topics.

Blah Fest: This involves participants coming up with preposterous explanations for the hypotheses given to them.

Minimalistic Pedagogy: Participants have to explain a complex scientific concept in the simplest way possible to an audience consisting of laypeople.

Dance and Music Events: There are themed dances, and music competitions like Junkyard Jamming and duet competitions organized every year.

Art Events: There are events like ‘Brushes On’ and ‘Facial Èclat’, and a Wall Painting competition.

Literary Events: Events like Just a Minute (JAM) and Crime Scene Investigation (CSI) attract participants every year.

Quiz: The Karavaan Quiz held by the quiz club attracts quiz lovers from all over Pune each year.

Leadership Conclave: This is a talk series which hosts a number of eminent speakers from across the country with expertise in a diverse range of fields. They talk about various anecdotes from their lives, and their work and experiences.

=== Main-Stage Events ===
Karavaan’s most popular events, such as the Karavaan Showcase, Pronite and Band-Wars, are held in the evening on the mainstage.

==== Karavaan Showcase ====
The Karavaan Showcase offers a platform for the students of IISER to perform on the main-stage. It has seen concerts from various IISER Pune music bands, Memes and Mad-Ads from the Drama troupes, solo and group-dances, and other in-house performances.

==== Band Wars ====
The Band Wars had been a highlight of Karavaan since its inception till 2015. Music bands playing various genres were invited from all over the country to face off against one another. The event had been judged by members of the band performing during Pronite.

Band Wars is set to return in the 2019 edition of Karavaan.

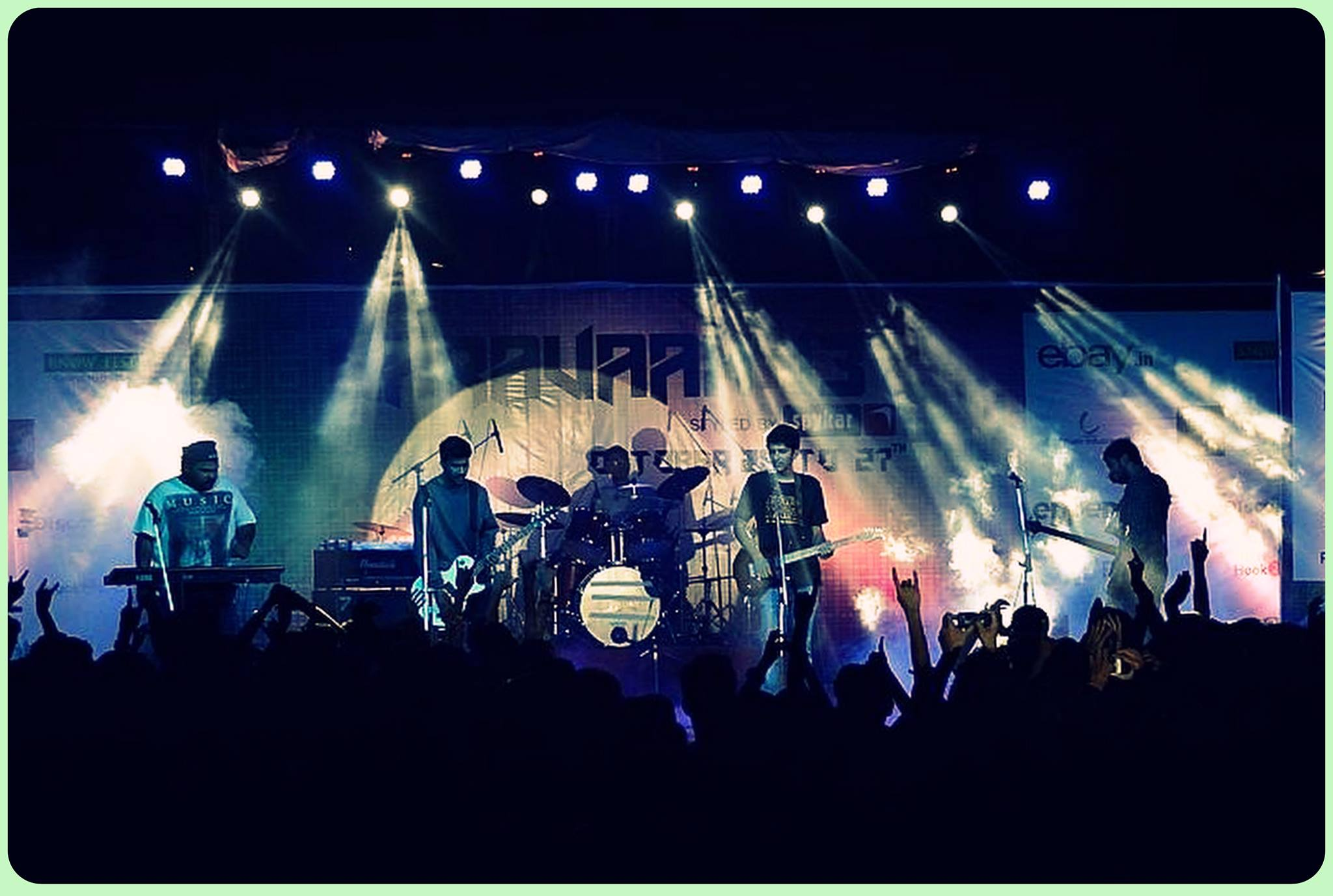
Studmuffin, winner of the Band Wars, playing live at Karavaan 2013.

Previous winners of the Band Wars :

Year	Winner
Karavaan 2015	Ryan Victor Project and Celestial Teapot
Karavaan 2014	The Gravy Philosophy
Karavaan 2013	Studmuffin from Pune
Karavaan 2012	Last Ride Home from Mumbai
Karavaan 2011	Point Blanc from Pune

==== Pronite ====
Pronite is the main attraction of Karavaan. It involves an evening with performances by popular artists from diverse fields. Karavaan has hosted several live music performances by well-known bands from across the country. Karavaan '11 hosted ‘Black’ from Mumbai while Karavaan '12 had a concert by ‘Divine Raaga’, a Hindi folk-fusion-rock band based in Bangalore. 'Chaoskampf', a metal band from Pune, performed in Karavaan '13. K'14 hosted vocalist Siddharth Basrur and band, featuring guitarist Adil Manuel. He was succeeded by Sonu Kakkar and DJ Anshul in K'15, and 'Indian Ocean' in K'16. K’17 hosted renowned stand-up comedian Sorabh Pant, and the well-known indie bands Lagori and 'The Local Train'. K’18 had two comic acts by Anirban Dasgupta and Karunesh Talwar, followed by an energetic music performance by the Carnatic progressive rock band 'Agam'.

== Karavaan '14 ==
The seventh edition of Karavaan commenced on 31 October 2014, with 'Halloween' as the theme of the fest. Various competitions across disciplines like music, dance, drama, science, math and literature were organised by the respective clubs of IISER Pune over the weekend (1 and 2 November). The Band Wars saw competing bands from all across the country with 'The Gravy Philosophy' emerging as the victors. Pronite hosted a concert by popular vocalist Siddharth Basrur and band, featuring guitarist Adil Manuel. The fest ended with a masquerade party featuring DJ Ansh.

=== The Largest Warli Painting: A Limca Record ===
Over 300 IISER students took part in a colossal effort to create one of the largest Warli paintings in the world on 2 November 2014 as a part of the Karavaan events. Warli painting is a traditional art form of the Warli tribe. An initiative by the Art Club of IISER Pune, the completed artwork spanned over 2,500 square metres (27,000 sq ft) on the football field. This feat was achieved in less than 12 hours and entered the Limca Book of Records.

== Karavaan '15 ==
Karavaan ’15 was organized on 16, 17 and 18 October 2015. In its eighth edition, Karavaan expanded its ambit to include social and science-related events along with cultural activities. The Pre-Karavaan events included sessions by ResQ(an NGO dedicated to the rehabilitation of stray animals), a blood donation camp and a clean-up drive near Pashan Lake, along with events like Happy Saturday (a Saturday morning of fun and games) and Art from Scrap.

K’15 was themed ‘India - Revive your Roots’. There were competitions based on traditional Indian art forms, a quiz on India and a street play competition, along with science competitions aimed at highlighting the fun side of science. The first edition of the Leadership Conclave was held this year, featuring eminent leaders of society such as former director of NCL, Dr Sourav Pal and army veteran, Colonel Gaurav Chibber.

Band Wars was held in association with MTVi Xtreme and saw participation from bands across several genres, with 'Ryan Victor Project' and 'Celestial Teapot' emerging as the winners. Pronite hosted popular Bollywood singer Sonu Kakkar and DJ Anshul.

== Karavaan '16 ==
The ninth edition of Karavaan was held on 4, 5 and 6 November 2016. The theme for the fest was ‘Adventures in Wonderland - Down the Rabbit Hole’. There were games involving characters from Alice in Wonderland besides other the regular events.

Distinguished speakers, Anand Gandhi, Mitali Panganti, Prajakta Divekar, Kamal Swaroop, Abhijeet Barse, Sathish Narayanan and Anil Zankar graced the second edition of the leadership conclave, thematically named ‘The Mad Tea Party’. In the event ‘A Snake’s Tale’, Mr. Aditya Paranjape spread awareness regarding different kinds of snakes.

Pronite, held on 6 November, recorded a footfall of more than 2200 people. It featured a Pune-based local band ‘After Acoustics’, the iconic ‘Indian Ocean’ and professional Irish sword-swallower and comedian, Mr. Murray Malloy.

== Karavaan '17 ==
The tenth edition of Karavaan was held on 3, 4 and 5November 2017. The theme for the fest was ‘Seasons’. The pre-Karavaan events comprised an art workshop by Vinod More, a ‘Hackathon’ in collaboration with the Entrepreneurship and Development Cell of IISER, a talk on health and sanitation by Mr Pravin Nikam (founder of ROSHNI), a blood donation camp, a meme-making competition, a Zumba workshop and a drama named "The Sun was White, the Moon Disobedient" by Dr. John Matthew.

The third edition of the Leadership Conclave hosted dignitaries as Dr Sandeep Pandey, Mr Avirook Sen, Ms Anuja Kapur and Dr Satyajit Rath. The inaugural ‘Comedy Night’ was held on 4 November, featuring Shrinidhi Mahishi (an alumnus of IISER) and renowned comedian Sorabh Pant. Finally, Pronite was held on 5 November and hosted the well-known Indie bands ‘Lagori’ and ‘The Local Train’.

== Karavaan '18 ==
The eleventh edition of Karavaan was held on 2, 3 and 4November 2018. The theme for the fest was ‘Fandoms and Fiction’. The pre-Karavaan events included a talk on the verdict against Section 377 of the Indian Code by R. Raj Rao, Dr Aijaz Ahmed Bund and Bindumadhav Khire; a blood donation camp; and an online treasure hunt by IPLUG named Conquistar. The third edition of the Leadership Conclave had Prof Sandhya Visweswariah, Prof Sanjeev Galande, Dr Rajeev Sharma, Prof Sabyasachi Bhattacharya and Prof Sunil Mukhi discuss about funding and the future of science in India.

The daytime events during the Karavaan weekend included games and activities like ‘Rube Goldberg’, ‘Shipwreck’, ‘Just a Minute’, ‘Facial Èclat’, ‘Crime Scene Investigation’, ‘Karavaan Treasure Hunt’, ‘Games Night’ and others organised by the various clubs at IISER. The Karavaan Showcase featured a noteworthy 30 person-9 act dance piece.

Pronite 2018 was held on the evening of 4 November 2018. It featured renowned stand-up comedians Anirban Dasgupta and Karunesh Talwar, along with the Carnatic progressive fusion rock band 'Agam'.

== See also ==
- List of cultural festivals in Indian colleges
- Mimamsa-IISER Pune
