= IBB =

IBB may refer to:

== Government ==
- Ibrahim Badamasi Babangida (born 1941), President of Nigeria from 1985 to 1993
- International Broadcasting Bureau, technical support body for the Voice of America and other US government broadcasting services
- Istanbul Metropolitan Municipality (Turkish: İstanbul Büyükşehir Belediyesi), the governing body of Istanbul

== Scholarly organizations ==
- Ibrahim Badamasi Babangida University, university in Nigeria
- Institute of Biochemistry and Biophysics, a research institute in Iran
- Institute of Bioinformatics and Biotechnology, a scientific research institute in Pune, India

== Other ==
- Ibb (Arabic: إب), a city in Yemen
- Indiana Business Bulletin, a business-news website
- Intentional base on balls, a ploy in baseball
- International Brotherhood of Boilermakers, Iron Ship Builders, Blacksmiths, Forgers and Helpers, a North American trade union
- International Brotherhood of Bookbinders, a defunct North American trade union
- Internet Bug Bounty, a Bug bounty program for Internet-related software
- ibb, the ISO 639-3 code for the Ibibio language
