= George Sterman =

American theoretical physicist

George F. Stermann
- Born: June 2, 1946 (age 80); Washington, D.C.
- Education: University of Chicago; University of Maryland
- Known for: Sterman-Weinberg Jets proof of factorization theorems Resummation
- Awards: J.J. Sakurai Prize for Theoretical Particle Physics (2003)
- Scientific career
- Fields: Physics
- Workplaces: C. N. Yang Institute for Theoretical Physics; Stony Brook University
- Doctoral advisor: Alex J. Dragt
- Doctoral students: Sunil Mukhi, Ashoke Sen

George Franklin Sterman (born June 2, 1946) is an American theoretical physicist and the Director of the C. N. Yang Institute for Theoretical Physics at Stony Brook University where he holds the rank Distinguished Professor.

== Background ==
George Sterman received an A.B. from the University of Chicago in 1968. He earned his Ph.D. from the University of Maryland in 1974, and held research associate positions at the University of Illinois (1974–1976), Stony Brook University (1976–1978) and the Institute for Advanced Study (1978–1979), before joining the faculty of the C.N. Yang Institute for Theoretical Physics at Stony Brook in 1979. He became director of the Institute in 2001.

== Research ==
George Sterman's research focuses on quantum field theory and its applications in quantum chromodynamics. With Steven Weinberg he proved the infrared finiteness of jet cross sections, thus proving that perturbation theory is a safe method in that regime. He also worked on reformulation and proof of factorization theorems with Stephen Libby, John C. Collins and Davison E. Soper. He authored a textbook entitled An Introduction to Quantum Field Theory in 1993. As of 2010 he has over 190 papers listed as published on HEP-SPIRES.

George Sterman was awarded an honorary doctorate from the ETH Zurich in Switzerland in 2026 “For his groundbreaking theoretical research in particle physics, in particular the discovery of concepts and structures in quantum chromodynamics that serve as the basis for the theoretical interpretation of collision experiments and enable precise tests of the fundamental laws of nature in high-energy physics.” He was also awarded the 2003 J.J. Sakurai Prize for Theoretical Particle Physics "For developing concepts and techniques in QCD, such as infrared safety and factorization in hard processes, which permitted precise quantitative predictions and experimental tests, and thereby helped to establish QCD as the theory of the strong interactions." He received a Guggenheim Fellowship in 1985, is a Fellow of the American Physical Society and has served as an Associate Editor for Physical Review Letters.
