= Hoker =

Hoker is a surname. Notable people with the surname include:

- Robert Hoker (died 1537), English Member of Parliament for Exeter
- John Hoker (c. 1527–1601), English constitutionalist

== See also ==
- Eric D'Hoker (born 1956), Belgian-American theoretical physicist
- Hooker (disambiguation)
