= CBER (disambiguation) =

CBER and similar may refer to:

- Center for Biologics Evaluation and Research, one of the six main centers of the Food and Drug Administration
- Center for Business and Economic Research, Ball State University research center
- CBer, a person who uses citizens' band radio
- Coma Berenices, nonstandard abbreviation for the constellation
