= Sunil Mukhi =

Indian physicist

- Born: 20 November 1956 (age 69); Bombay, Bombay State, India
- Education: St. Xavier's College, Mumbai; Mumbai University; Stony Brook University
- Known for: String Theory
- Awards: S.S. Bhatnagar Award 1999; J.C. Bose Fellowship, 2008.
- Scientific career
- Fields: Physics
- Workplaces: Indian Institute of Science Education and Research, Pune; International Centre for Theoretical Physics; Tata Institute of Fundamental Research
- Doctoral advisor: George Sterman

Sunil Mukhi is an Indian theoretical physicist working in the areas of string theory, quantum field theory and particle physics. Currently he is adjunct professor at the International Centre for Theoretical Sciences of the Tata Institute of Fundamental Research and honorary professor emeritus at the Indian Institute of Science Education and Research, Pune.

== Career ==
He obtained a B.Sc. degree at St. Xavier's College, Mumbai and a Ph.D. in theoretical physics in 1981 from Stony Brook University (also called the State University of New York at Stony Brook). After spending two years as a post-doctoral fellow at the International Centre for Theoretical Physics at Trieste, Italy, he returned to India, where he worked at the Tata Institute of Fundamental Research in Mumbai, India, at first as a post doc and then he managed to get a position there, from 1984 to 2012. In 2012 he left the Tata Institute of Fundamental Research to join the Indian Institute of Science Education and Research, Pune as the head of the Physics Department, a position he held until 2018. In 2019 he became dean of faculty at the same institute. He retired from IISER Pune in October 2026.

== Research ==
His major publications deal with fundamental properties of string theories, and include the conformal invariance of supersymmetric two-dimensional field theories which describe the world-sheet dynamics of strings, the study of supersymmetric solitons using index theorems, the discovery of a new duality between string theory and M-theory, the identification of string networks as supersymmetric states and the discovery of a novel Higgs mechanism in the worldvolume theory of M-theory membranes.

== Other activities ==
In 2002, he played a role in exposing a series of instances of plagiarism by the Vice-Chancellor of Kumaon University in India. The Vice-Chancellor was eventually found guilty by a national committee and subsequently resigned.

Mukhi has a number of interests in addition to physics, notably Indian Classical Music on which he maintains a webpage , science popularisation which he carries out through seminars at schools and colleges as well as newspaper articles, and cinema, cooking and meditation. Within the field of Indian Classical Music he has spent considerable effort archiving classic recordings, particularly those of notable vocal artist Pandit Kumar Gandharva on whom he also maintains a webpage . He has previously written a blog, named "Tantu-jaal". During 2018-2020 he was lead vocalist of the progressive heavy metal band Let's Keep Thinking, based on the IISER Pune campus.

== Honors ==
Mukhi is a Fellow of the Indian Academy of Sciences, Indian National Science Academy and The World Academy of Sciences, and a recipient of the S.S. Bhatnagar Award for Physical Sciences, 1999 and the J.C. Bose Fellowship, 2008. He has been an editor of the Journal of High Energy Physics since its inception in 1997. He is chair of the Panel on Scientific Values of the Indian Academy of Sciences.

Mukhi was an invited speaker at the international conferences Strings 2000 in Michigan, Strings 2002 in Cambridge and Strings 2008 in Geneva. He was one of the organisers of Strings 2001 in Mumbai — a conference that attracted much publicity because of the participation of David Gross, Stephen Hawking and Edward Witten. He has also lectured at advanced schools in theoretical physics, notably at Cargèse and Les Houches in France, at the SERC school series in India, and at the first PITP School at the Institute for Advanced Study in Princeton during his sabbatical year there. He was a Visiting Fellow Commoner at Trinity College, Cambridge during the Lent Term, 2012.
