= David Gross =

American particle physicist and string theorist

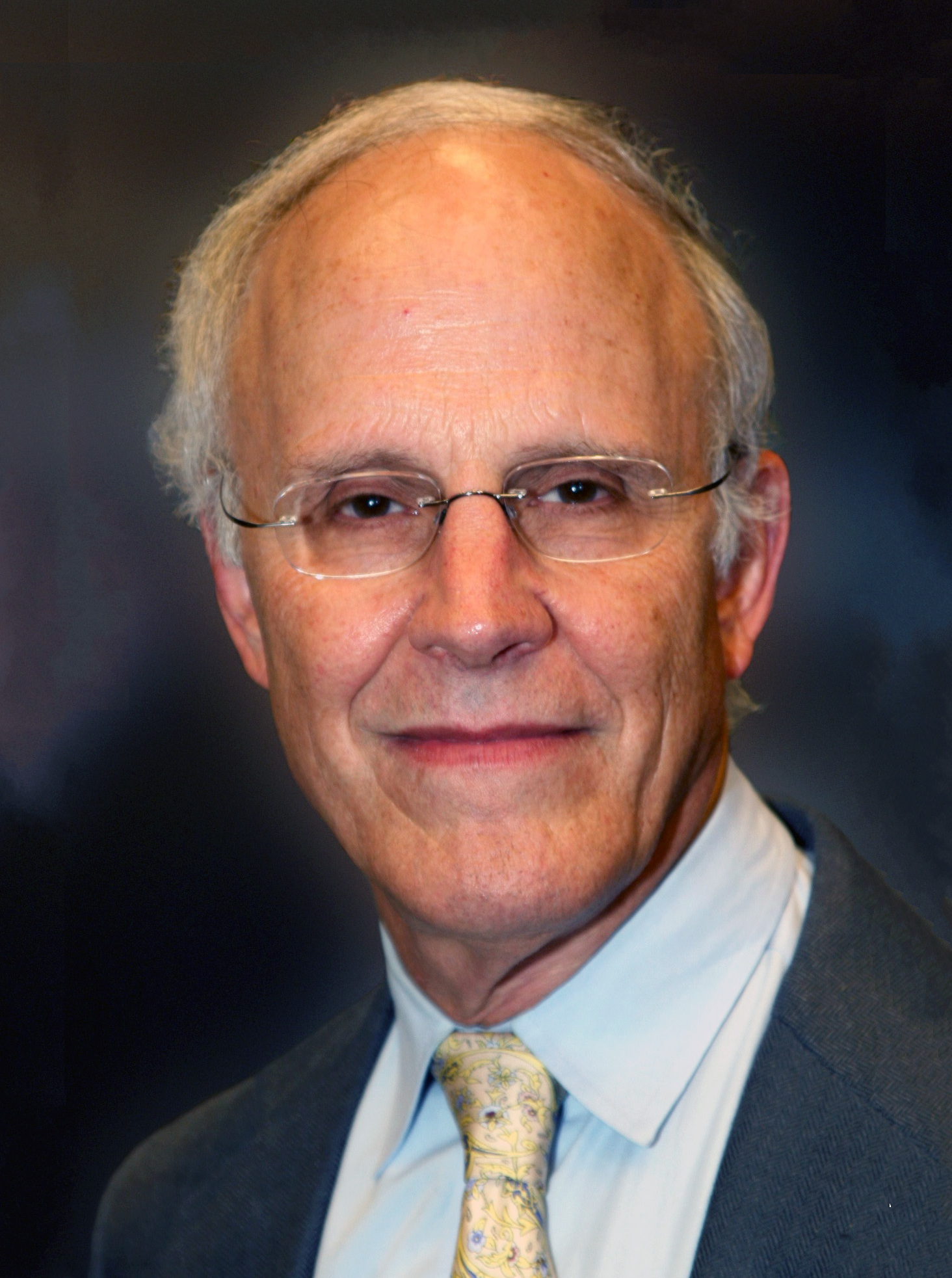
- Gross in 2007
- Born: David Jonathan Gross; February 19, 1941 (age 85); Washington, D.C., U.S.
- Education: Hebrew University of Jerusalem (BSc); University of California, Berkeley (PhD)
- Known for: Asymptotic freedom Heterotic string Gross–Neveu model
- Spouse(s): Shulamith Toaff Gross (divorced); Jacquelyn Savani
- Children: 2
- Awards: Dirac Medal (1988); Harvey Prize (2000); Nobel Prize in Physics (2004); Breakthrough Prize in Fundamental Physics (2026)
- Scientific career
- Fields: Theoretical physics
- Workplaces: University of California, Santa Barbara; Harvard University; Princeton University
- Thesis: Investigation of the many-body, multichannel partial-wave scattering amplitude (1966)
- Doctoral advisor: Geoffrey Chew
- Doctoral students: Natan Andrei; Frank Wilczek; Edward Witten; William E. Caswell; Eric D'Hoker; Rajesh Gopakumar; Nikita Nekrasov; Stephen Bernard Libby
- Website: www.kitp.ucsb.edu/gross

David Jonathan Gross (/ɡroʊs/; born February 19, 1941) is an American theoretical physicist and string theorist. He shared the 2004 Nobel Prize in Physics with Frank Wilczek and Hugh David Politzer "for the discovery of asymptotic freedom in the theory of the strong interaction".

Gross is the Chancellor's Chair Professor of Theoretical Physics at the Kavli Institute for Theoretical Physics (KITP) of the University of California, Santa Barbara (UCSB), and was formerly the KITP director and holder of their Frederick W. Gluck Chair in Theoretical Physics. He is also a faculty member in the UCSB Physics Department and is affiliated with the Institute for Quantum Studies at Chapman University in California. He is a foreign member of the Chinese Academy of Sciences.

== Early life and education ==
Gross was born in Washington, D.C., in February 1941 to a Jewish family from Austro-Hungary. His grandfather was born in Hungary. His parents were Nora (Faine) and Bertram Myron Gross (1912–1997). Gross studied in high school at the Hebrew University Secondary School in Jerusalem. He received his bachelor's degree from the Hebrew University of Jerusalem, in 1962. He received his Ph.D. in physics from the University of California, Berkeley in 1966, under the supervision of Geoffrey Chew.

== Research and career ==
In 1973, Gross, working with his first graduate student, Frank Wilczek, at Princeton University, discovered asymptotic freedom—the primary feature of non-Abelian gauge theories—which led Gross and Wilczek to the formulation of quantum chromodynamics (QCD), the theory of the strong nuclear force. Asymptotic freedom is a phenomenon where the nuclear force weakens at short distances, which explains why experiments at very high energy can be understood as if nuclear particles are made of non-interacting quarks. Therefore, the closer quarks are to each other, the less the strong interaction (or color charge) is between them; when quarks are in extreme proximity, the nuclear force between them is so weak that they behave almost as free particles. The flip side of asymptotic freedom is that the force between quarks grows stronger as one tries to separate them. This is the reason why the nucleus of an atom can never be broken into its quark constituents.

QCD completed the Standard Model, which details the three basic forces of particle physics—the electromagnetic force, the weak force, and the strong force. Gross was awarded the 2004 Nobel Prize in Physics, with Politzer and Wilczek, for this discovery.

Gross, with Jeffrey A. Harvey, Emil Martinec, and Ryan Rohm also formulated the theory of the heterotic string. The four were whimsically nicknamed the "Princeton String Quartet." He continues to do research in this field at the KITP.

He was a junior fellow at Harvard University (1966–69) and a Eugene Higgins Professor of Physics at Princeton University until 1997, when he began serving as Princeton's Thomas Jones Professor of Mathematical Physics Emeritus. He has received many honors, including a MacArthur Foundation Fellowship in 1987 and the Dirac Medal in 1988.

== Activism ==
In 2003, Gross was one of 22 Nobel Laureates who signed the Humanist Manifesto.

Gross is one of the 20 American recipients of the Nobel Prize in Physics to sign a letter addressed to President George W. Bush in May 2008, urging him to "reverse the damage done to basic science research in the Fiscal Year 2008 Omnibus Appropriations Bill" by requesting additional emergency funding for the Department of Energy's Office of Science, the National Science Foundation, and the National Institute of Standards and Technology.

In 2015, Gross signed the Mainau Declaration 2015 on Climate Change on the final day of the 65th Lindau Nobel Laureate Meeting. The declaration was signed by a total of 76 Nobel Laureates and handed to then-President of the French Republic, François Hollande, as part of the successful COP21 climate summit in Paris.

In 2026, at the 75th Lindau Nobel Laureate Meeting, Gross and two other Laureates issued this urgent warning about the growing risk of nuclear war, that the half life of our civilization is 34 years, and presented concrete policy recommendations to governments worldwide. Their call to action was built on the 2024 Mainau Declaration on Nuclear Weapons, now signed by 104 Nobel Laureates.

In July 2026, the Vatican Nobel Assembly issued the groundbreaking "Rome Declaration for an Unarmed and Disarming Peace in the Age of Artificial Intelligence, Nuclear and Autonomous Weapons, New Digital Protocols, and Emerging Models of Digital Development, signed by more than 200 of the world’s most authoritative figures. Gross was a co-organizer of the Assembly, which was inspired by Pope Leo XIV’s Encyclical Magnifica humanitas, dedicated to safeguarding the human person in the age of artificial intelligence.

== Family ==
Gross' first wife was Shulamith (Toaff), and they had two children. He also has a stepdaughter by his second wife, Jacquelyn Savani. He has three brothers, including Larry Gross, professor of communication, Samuel R. Gross, professor of law, and Theodore (Teddy) Gross, a playwright.

== Honors and awards ==
- J. J. Sakurai Prize, American Physical Society (1986)
- Fellowship Prize, MacArthur Foundation (1987)
- Dirac Medal, International Center for Theoretical Physics (1988)
- Oscar Klein Medal, Royal Swedish Academy (2000)
- Harvey Prize, Technion-Israel Institute of Technology (2000)
- High Energy and Particle Physics Prize, European Physical Society (2003)
- Grande Médaille d'Or, French Academy of Sciences (2004)
- Nobel Prize in Physics (2004)
- Golden Plate Award, Academy of Achievement (2005)
- San Carlos Borromeo Award, University of San Carlos, Philippines (2008)
- Honorary Doctorate in Science, the University of Cambodia (2010)
- Richard E. Prange Prize, University of Maryland (2013)
- Medal of Honor, Joint Institute for Nuclear Research, Dubna, Russia (2016)
- Basic Science Lifetime Award (BSLA) in Physics, Int’l Congress of Basic Science (ICBS) (2025)
- Special Breakthrough Prize in Fundamental Physics (2026)
- Honorary Doctorate, Weizmann Institute of Science (2026)

== Memberships in academies and societies ==
- NSF Graduate Research Fellowship Program, National Science Foundation (1963–66)
- Fellowship, Alfred P. Sloan Foundation (1970–74)
- Fellow, American Physical Society (elected 1974)
- Member, American Academy of Arts and Sciences (elected 1985)
- Member, National Academy of Sciences (elected 1986)
- Fellow, American Association for the Advancement of Science (elected 1987)
- Honorary Fellow, Tata Institute of Fundamental Research (2005)
- Member, American Philosophical Society (elected 2007)
- Honorary Fellow, Indian Academy of Sciences, Bangalore, India (elected 2007)
- Fellow, The World Academy of Sciences for the developing world (elected 2007)
- Member, International Academy of Philosophy of Science (elected 2009)
- Foreign Member, Chinese Academy of Sciences (elected 2011)
- Foreign Member, Russian Academy of Sciences (elected 2016)
- Elected to a four-year term in the presidential line, the American Physical Society (2016–2020)

== Selected publications ==
Journal articles

- Gross, David; Wilczek, Frank (1973). "Ultraviolet Behavior of Non-Abelian Gauge Theories". Physical Review Letters. 30 (26): 1343–1346. Bibcode:1973PhRvL..30.1343G. doi:10.1103/PhysRevLett.30.1343.
- D. J. Gross and F. Wilczek, "Asymptotically Free Gauge Theories. I", Phys. Rev. D8 3633 (1973)

Technical reports

- Wilczek, F. and D. J. Gross. "Asymptotically Free Gauge Theories. I," National Accelerator Laboratory, Princeton University, United States Department of Energy (through predecessor agency the Atomic Energy Commission), (July 1973).
- Gross, D. J. and S. B. Treiman. "Hadronic Form Factors in Asymptotically Free Field Theories," Princeton University, United States Department of Energy (through predecessor agency the Atomic Energy Commission), (1974).
- Callan, C. G. Jr., Dashen, R. and D. J. Gross. "Instantons and Massless Fermions in Two Dimensions," Princeton University, United States Department of Energy (through predecessor agency the Energy Research and Development Administration), (May 1977).
- Gross, D. J. "Some New/Old Approaches to QCD," Lawrence Berkeley Laboratory, United States Department of Energy, National Science Foundation, (November 1992).

== See also ==
- List of Jewish Nobel laureates
