= Mimamsa-IISER =

Annual science quiz competition in India

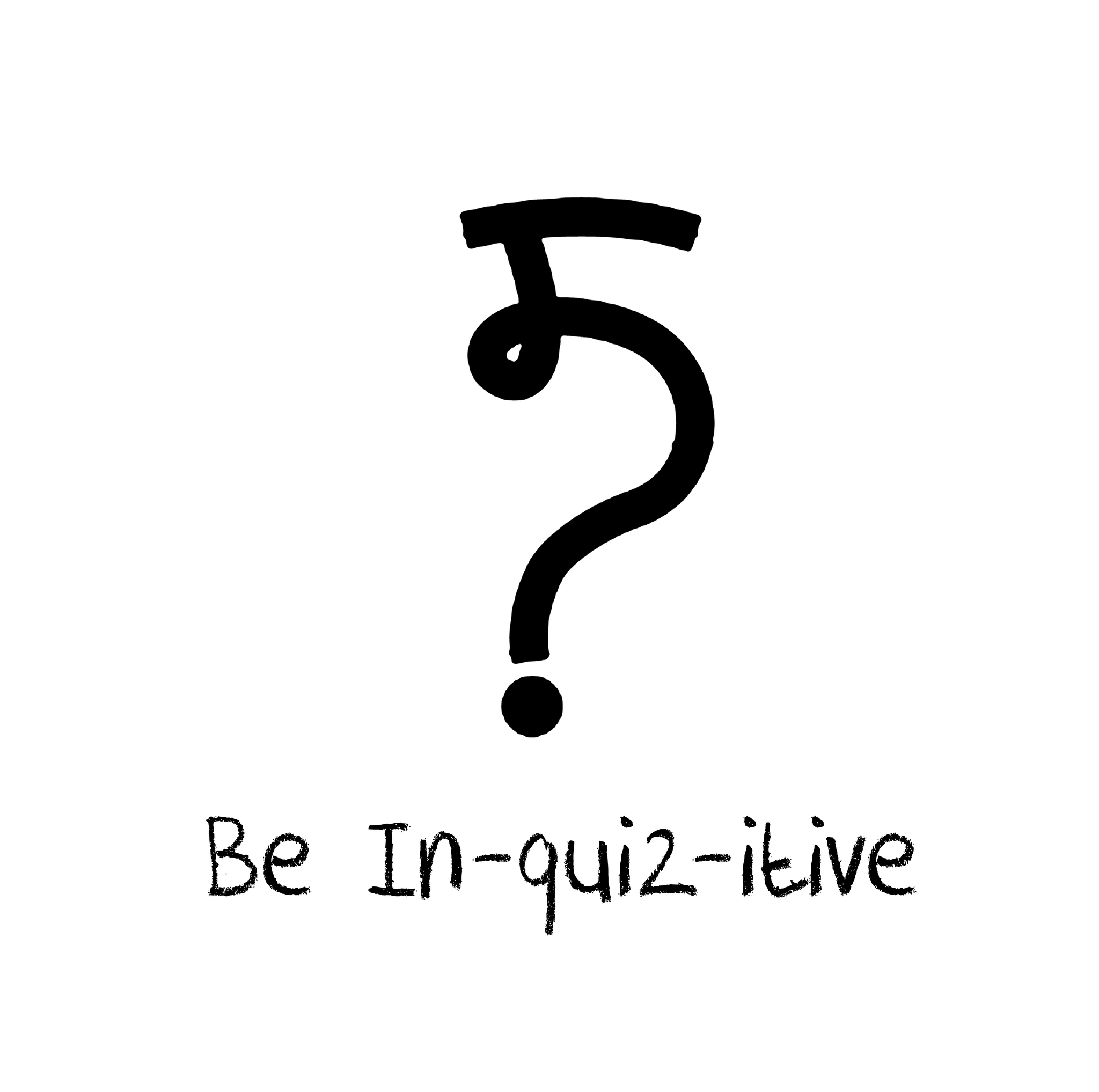
MIMAMSALogo of Mimamsa: Be in-quiz-itive

MIMAMSA is a national level inter-collegiate science competition for UG (1st, 2nd and 3rd Year) students, organized by IISER PUNE. It aims at creating a unique set of questions that focus on concepts and their interdependence. Mimamsa strives to convey the implicit beauty of science. Over the years the means of implementing this philosophy have been honed to give rise to one of India's toughest science quizzes. The fact that Mimamsa has gained national acclaim and renown is substantiated by the results of the quiz over the years. It has expanded to encompass all major regions of the country.

== History ==
Mimamsa was started in the year 2009. It was the brainchild of Sutirth Dey, along with several students who felt that science should be explored beyond the classroom. The philosophy of Mimamsa is embodied in the name itself, which means critical inquiry and investigation. The team wanted to break the mould of trivia-based quizzes and encourage participants to question their understanding along with their knowledge. Mimamsa is an undergraduate level quiz, for students studying in 1st to 3rd years of any undergraduate course in the sciences, engineering or medicine.

== Latest Announcements Corner (Mimamsa 2026) ==
Mimamsa'26 completed in March'22. The preparations of Mimamsa'27 is underway.

== Statistics Over The Years ==
EXAM YEAR	WINNER	2ND	3RD	4TH
2026	IIT Delhi	IISc Bangalore	IIT Madras	IISER Bhopal
2025	IISc Bangalore	IIT Bombay	IISER Kolkata	IIT Delhi
2024	IIT Bombay	IIT Delhi	IISc Bangalore	IIT Kanpur
2023	IISc Bangalore	IIT Delhi	IIT Madras	IIT Bombay
2022	IIT Madras	IISc Bengaluru	IISER Kolkata	IIT Roorkee
2021	IISc Bengaluru	IIT Delhi	IIT Madras	IIT Bombay
2020	IISc Bengaluru	IISER Kolkata	IIT Bombay	IIT Delhi
2019	IISc Bengaluru	IIT Bombay	IIT Delhi	IISER Tirupati
2018	IISc Bengaluru	IIT Bombay	IISER Kolkata	NISER Bhubaneswar
2017	IIT Bombay	IIT Madras		
2016	IISc Bengaluru	IIT Bombay	IIT Madras	University of Hyderabad
2015	IISc Bengaluru	IIT Madras		
2014	IISc Bengaluru	St. Xavier's College, Kolkata		
2013	IISc Bengaluru	NISER Bhubaneswar	BITS Pilani, Hyderabad	St. Xavier's College, Kolkata
2012	IISc Bengaluru	IIT Kanpur	IISER Thiruvananthapuram	St. Joseph's College, Bengaluru
2011	Osmania Medical College, Hyderabad	Fergusson College, Pune		
2010	Institute of Bioinformatics and Biotechnology, Pune	Fergusson College, Pune		
2009	Fergusson College, Pune	Institute of Bioinformatics and Biotechnology, Pune		

=== 2009 ===
The idea for Mimamsa was conceptualised in September 2008. The first edition, which took place in January and February 2009 included only colleges from Pune, though a college from Hyderabad also participated. The prelims had no online registration process and included only on the spot entries. The Mains were planned to have 4 finalists, a tradition that has been continued till date. Five colleges participated, out of which the finalists were: Fergusson College, Institute of Bioinformatics and Biotechnology (IBB), Garware College, and Wadia College. Institute of Bioinformatics and Biotechnology, Pune emerged as the runner-up in Mimamsa 2009 and Fergusson College, Pune emerged as the winner.

=== 2010 ===
Mimamsa 2010 followed the same pattern as that of the previous year. It was expanded to the cities of Mumbai, Nasik and Hyderabad, in addition to Pune. The prelims witnessed a dozen teams competing for the top 4 positions, and 50 participants in the individual category for the top 5 spots. Institute of Bioinformatics and Biotechnology, Pune emerged as the winner in Mimamsa 2010. The individual winner was Yashoda Chandorkar from Fergusson College, Pune.

=== 2011 ===
Mimamsa 2011 was the first time the individual entries were scrapped. The centres were the same as 2010, i.e. Mumbai, Nasik Hyderabad and Pune. Out of 84 teams in the prelims, BITS Pilani Hyderabad, Osmania Medical College, Fergusson College and University of Hyderabad made it to the top four finalists and were selected for the Mimamsa mains. Osmania Medical College of Hyderabad emerged as the winner in Mimamsa 2011.

=== 2012 ===
Mimamsa 2012 was expanded to cover nine cities all over India. The centres were Ahmedabad, Bangalore, Chennai, Delhi, Mumbai, Nagpur, Kolkata and Hyderabad, in addition to the host city, Pune. 142 teams participated in the prelims. The team comprising students of the Indian Institute of Science (IISc), Bengaluru, emerged as the winners of Mimamsa 2012.

=== 2013 ===
Mimamsa 2013 covered seven cities across the country, Pune, Bengaluru, Chennai, Delhi, Hyderabad, Kolkata and Mumbai. IISc Bengaluru emerged as the winner.

CENTRE TOPPERS:

Centre/Zone	Topper
Bangalore	IISc Bangalore
Chennai	IISER Thiruvananthapuram
Delhi	AIIMS
Hyderabad	University of Hyderabad
Kolkata	Bengal Engineering and Science University (BESU), now known as IIEST Shibpur
Mumbai	St. Xavier's College (Autonomous)
Pune	College of Engineering, Pune

=== 2014 ===
Mimamsa 2014 covered seven cities and IISc Bengaluru emerged as the winner.

=== 2015 ===
Mimamsa 2015 prelims saw a participation of 250 teams in 9 centres across India – Pune, Mumbai, Delhi, Kolkata, Bengaluru, Hyderabad, Chennai, Ahmedabad and Thiruvananthapuram. IISc Bengaluru emerged as the winner.

=== 2021 ===
Prelims was held via online version of centres on 14 March 2021 at 20 zones all over the country.

=== 2023 ===
Prelims was held virtually in remote-proctored mode on 29 January 2023. The top 4 qualifying teams participated in the challenging finals which was held in the month of April'23 at the IISER Pune campus.

IISc Bangalore wins the competition followed by IIT Delhi and IIT Madras in the first-runner up and 2nd runner-up positions respectively.

=== 2024 ===
No updates on this yet!

== General overview ==
The prelims generally take place during the third week of January and cover all the five subjects: mathematics, physics, chemistry, biology and earth and climate sciences (ECS).

The mains are generally held during the third week of March and spread over two consecutive days, comprising questions in all the five subjects. The questions designed in the mains, scrutinise every possible aspect of scientific reasoning and thus are divided into different categories:- Deep Thought, Brief Thought and Rapid Fire.

== General rules ==
The brief thought questions consist of four minutes of thinking time, one minute of presentation time and are marked out of ten points. The deep thought questions have seven minutes of thinking time and three minutes of presentation time. Each deep thought is worth 20 points. The 'oculomotor' round is a buzzer round wherein all questions are based on audio-visual cues with a negative marking scheme. The rapid fire round tests the speed and logical flow involved in arriving at an answer. The poster presentation, introduced in 2018, consists of all the teams presenting a poster on a topic of their choosing. The specific rules of each round may vary from year to year.

== Philosophy of Mimamsa ==
According to Darshan Joshi (BS MS 2007 batch), during its first few editions, Mimamsa was just an activity of Science Club of IISER Pune (another brainchild of students of the 2007 batch). The philosophy of Mimamsa is encrypted in the name itself which literally means investigation, inquiry and in-depth analysis. The idea was to come up with a science competition based on these principles rather than the usual quizzing philosophy which does not require participants to think. This is why Mimamsa is conducted over 2 days. The goal of the questions is to test the understanding of science rather than scientific information. This is why questions in Mimamsa are so different. The idea that through the process of solving the question one must develop a better understanding of science is also part of the core philosophy. Mimamsa prioritizes discussion and investigation over just a right or wrong answer.

== See also ==
- Indian Institute of Science Education and Research Pune (Hosting institute)
- IIT Madras
- IISERs
- IISc Bangalore
- IIT Bombay
