= List of awards and honors received by Hillary Clinton =

This is a list of awards and honors received by Hillary Clinton. Awards are broken out by biographical era received by her in, although they often recognize efforts conducted in previous eras as well. A few media or polling organizations have repeatedly named Clinton in annual recognitions they give; these mentions are listed at the end.

== While First Lady of Arkansas ==
- In 1983, Clinton was named Arkansas Woman of the Year by the Arkansas Democrat.
- In 1983, Clinton was named Headliner of the Year by the Arkansas Press Association.
- Around 1983 or 1984, Hillary and Bill Clinton were named Public Citizens of the Year by the Arkansas chapter of the National Association of Social Workers.
- In 1984, Clinton was named Arkansas (Young) Mother of the Year by the Arkansas Association of American Mothers.
- In the mid-1980s, Clinton was awarded an honorary doctorate by the University of Arkansas at Little Rock.
- In 1988 and 1991, Clinton was named by National Law Journal as one of the 100 most influential lawyers in America.
- In May 1992, Hendrix College (Conway, AR) awarded Clinton an honorary Doctor of Laws degree.

== While First Lady of the United States ==
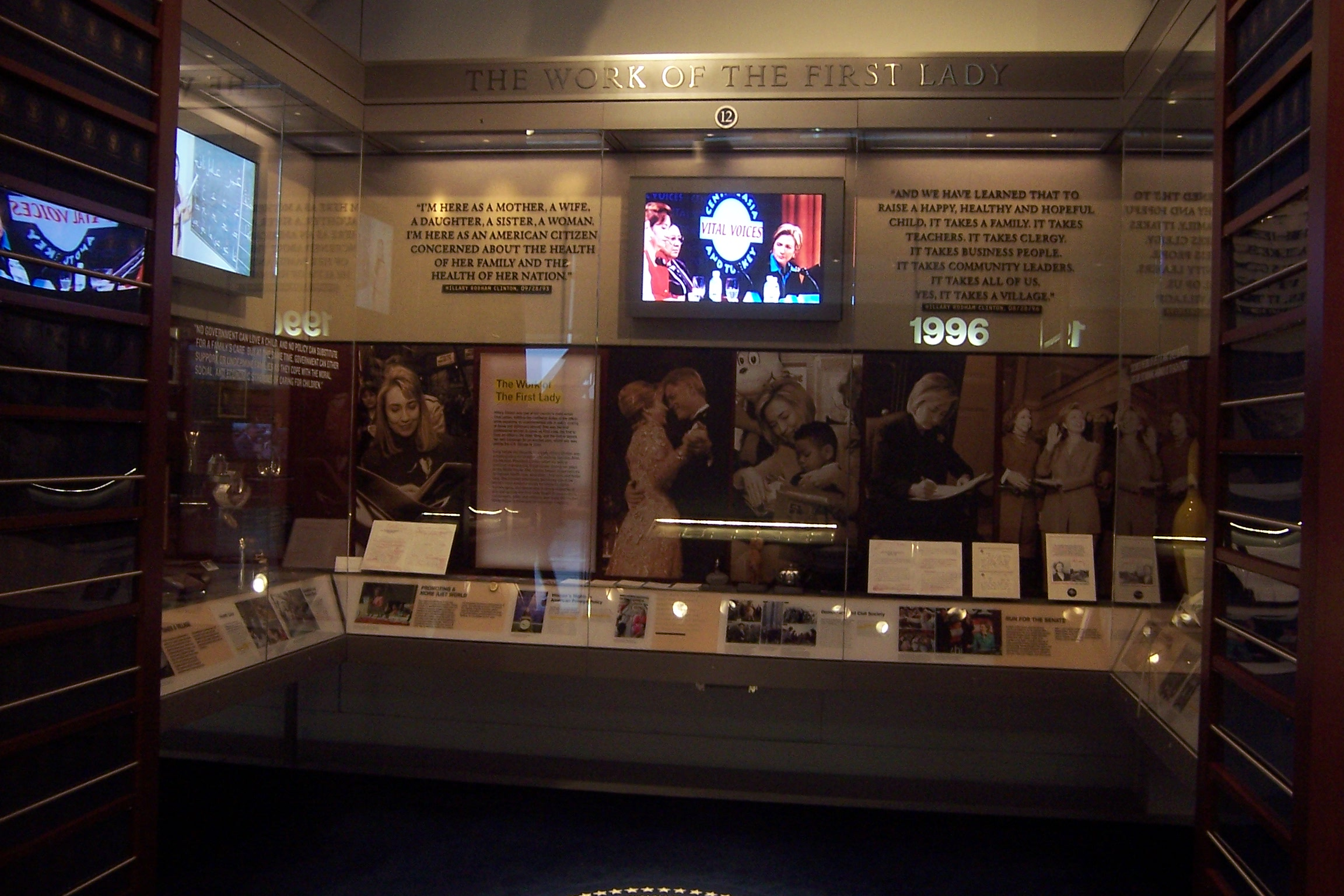
An exhibit at the William J. Clinton Presidential Center also honors Hillary Rodham Clinton's time as First Lady of the United States.

- In May 1993, Clinton received an honorary doctorate at the University of Pennsylvania. She also served as the university's commencement speaker that year.
- Around 1994, Clinton received the Living Legacy Award from the Women's International Center, in recognition of "her vast contributions in so many fields, especially honoring her work for women and children."
- In 1994, a special variety of tulip was cultivated and named for her in The Netherlands; it was still being grown as of the late 2000s.
- In 1995, the New York University Annual Survey of American Law dedicated its 52nd volume to Clinton. Each spring since 1942 the NYU Annual Survey has dedicated a volume to a preeminent attorney. On hand to honor Clinton were Former Secretary of the Treasury and United States Senator Lloyd M. Bentsen, Nobel Peace Laureate Elie Wiesel, Her Majesty Queen Noor of Jordan, United States Secretary of the Treasury Robert Rubin, and United States Senator Edward M. Kennedy.
- In June 1995, Mount Saint Vincent University awarded Clinton an honorary Doctor of Humane Letters.
- Clinton won the Grammy Award for Best Spoken Word Album for It Takes a Village during the Grammy Awards of 1997.
- In 1997, Clinton was given the Lincoln Medal from the Ford's Theatre Society, presented annually to "individuals who, through their body of work, accomplishments or personal attributes, exemplify the lasting legacy, and mettle of character embodied by" Abraham Lincoln.
- In May 1998, Clinton received the United Arab Emirates Health Foundation Prize for her work in health and social welfare, especially as it related to women, children, and families.
- In April 1999, Clinton was honored with the Lifetime Achievement Award from the Children of Chernobyl Relief Fund for her support of that Ukrainian organization's efforts regarding legacy effects of the Chernobyl accident.
- In June 1999, Clinton received the Mother Teresa Award, the highest honor given to civilians by Albania. This was in recognition of her humanitarian efforts following the Kosovo War and worldwide.
- On June 22, 1999, Clinton received the Ellis Island Medal of Honor.

== While United States Senator from New York ==
- On March 26, 2004, Clinton was presented with the inaugural Nursing Health and Humanity Award from the University of Rochester School of Nursing.
- On August 26, 2004, Clinton was awarded the honorary degree of Doctor of Laws, (LLD) by the University of Ulster.
- On February 13, 2005, Clinton was awarded the German Media Prize 2004. "Hillary Clinton is a model politician for millions of women around the world" who "represents in an exemplary way women's rights", the jury for the prize said.
- On February 15, 2005, Clinton was given the American Medical Women's Association's President's Vision & Voice Award, for being an advocate for women's health and related issues.
- In May 2005, Clinton received an honorary doctorate from Agnes Scott College near Atlanta for being a "defender of human rights" and "a resolute defender of the rights of women and girls."
- On July 30, 2005, Clinton was given the Reserve Officers Association's National President's Award.
- In September 2005, Clinton initially accepted but later rejected honorary membership into Alpha Kappa Alpha due to its exclusive requirements which would prevent her from accepting honorary membership in other National Pan-Hellenic Council organizations.
- On October 9, 2005, Clinton was inducted into the National Women's Hall of Fame.
- In April 2006, Clinton was honored with the Remembrance Award from the Northeastern New York Chapter of the Alzheimer's Association.
- On June 14, 2006, Clinton received an Energy Leadership Award from the United States Energy Association's Energy Efficiency Forum, in recognition of her leadership on energy issues.
- During 2007, Clinton was awarded an honorary doctorate in medicine by the University of Gothenburg in Sweden, for being "a strong advocate for increased investment in medical research" and for "raising awareness of the increased health problems linked to obesity, poor quality food and physical inactivity."
- Senator Clinton was named Person of the Year in 2007 by Irish America magazine.
- For 2008, Clinton was named NY1's New Yorker of the Year.
- On January 17, 2009, Senator Clinton received the Salute to Greatness Award from the Martin Luther King Jr. Center for Nonviolent Social Change.

== While United States Secretary of State ==
- Newsweek ranked her as the 13th most powerful person on the planet, and the most powerful American woman, in its "Global Elite" for 2009.
- In 2009, Clinton received the Global Trailblazer award from Vital Voices Global Partnership, for "her passionate commitment to promoting women's rights and securing justice for all people around the world."
- On March 27, 2009, Clinton received the Margaret Sanger Award from the Planned Parenthood Federation of America, which the organization says "recognize[s] leadership, excellence, and outstanding contributions to the reproductive health and rights movement."
- On May 13, 2009, Clinton received an honorary Doctor of Laws degree from New York University and spoke at their 177th commencement at new Yankee Stadium.
- On May 18, 2009, Clinton received Barnard College's highest award, the Barnard Medal of Distinction, as she spoke at their commencement.
- On May 25, 2009, Clinton received an honorary Doctor of Law degree from Yale University, from whose law school she had graduated three dozen years earlier.
- Also on May 25, 2009, Clinton received an award from the National Coordinated Effort of Hellenes, for "unprecedented steps taken in the right direction on Hellenic and Orthodox issues".
- During 2009, Clinton received the Freedom Medal, part of the Four Freedoms Awards from the Roosevelt Institute.
- On October 5, 2010, Secretary Clinton was given the George McGovern Leadership Award by the World Food Programme, for "her commitment and visionary approach to ending global hunger."
- On April 15, 2011, Clinton received the Walther-Rathenau-Preis in Berlin "for outstanding contributions to international understanding and cooperation".
- On June 2, 2011, Secretary Clinton was given the George C. Marshall Foundation Award for a career of distinguished public service, and in particular, "for her dignity and integrity of character, for her devotion to creating and perpetuating free and democratic institutions, and for promoting appropriate economic development that will allow them to flourish."
- In 2012, she was chosen as one of Barbara Walters' 10 Most Fascinating People of the year.
- In March 2012, Arkansas' largest airport, in Little Rock, was renamed to Bill and Hillary Clinton National Airport/Adams Field.
- In April 2012, Clinton received a Woodrow Wilson Award for Public Service.
- On May 24, 2012, Clinton was given the Champions for Change Award for Leadership by the International Center for Research on Women, "in recognition of her long-standing dedication to empowering women and girls worldwide and ensuring their human rights."
- In December 2012, the Saban Center for Middle East Policy's annual Saban Forum honored Clinton with a keynote speech introduced by an eight-minute video that featured several foreign leaders and considerable praise from Israeli leaders Benjamin Netanyahu, Tzipi Livni, Shimon Peres, and Ehud Barak.
- In Belfast on December 8, 2012, Clinton was given a Lifetime Achievement Award by The Worldwide Ireland Funds, in recognition of her efforts for peace and reconciliation in Northern Ireland during her time as First Lady, Senator, and Secretary of State.
- On January 15, 2013, Clinton was awarded the Philippine Legion of Honor.

== While private citizen before 2016 presidential election ==
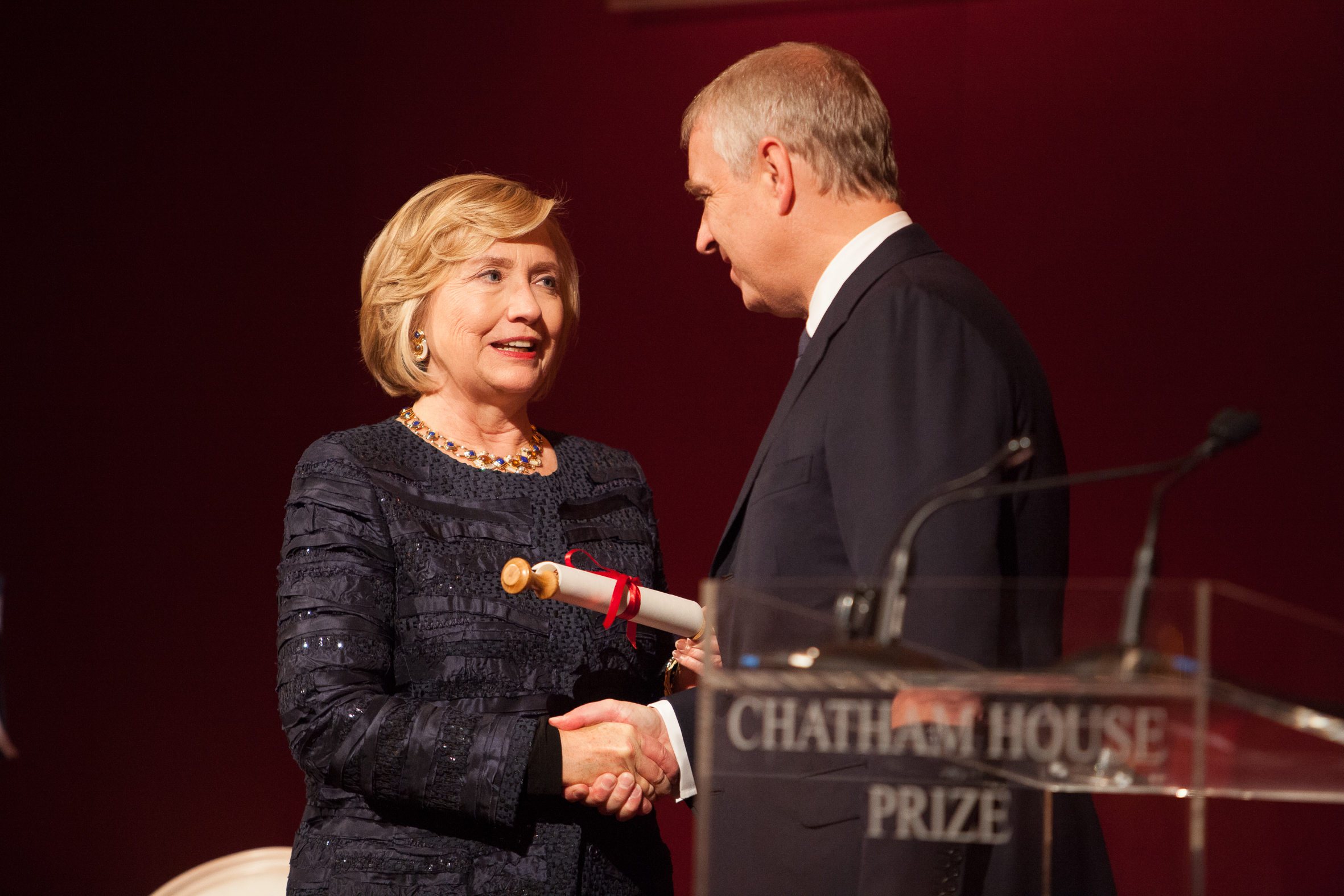
Clinton being presented with the 2013 Chatham House Prize by Prince Andrew, Duke of York

- On February 14, 2013, two weeks after stepping down as Secretary of State, Clinton was given Department of Defense Medal for Distinguished Public Service, the highest Pentagon medal given to private citizens or politicians. Both Clinton and Defense Secretary Leon Panetta praised the unusually cooperative relationship the two departments had during Clinton's tenure.
- On May 8, 2013, Clinton was honored by the Pacific Council on International Policy with the inaugural Warren Christopher Public Service Award.
- On July 8, 2013, the Hillary Rodham Clinton Children's Library and Learning Center was dedicated in Little Rock, Arkansas, having recently been named that by the Central Arkansas Library System. Clinton read The Very Hungry Caterpillar to mark the occasion.
- On August 28, 2013, the British international affairs think tank Chatham House voted Clinton as the 2013 winner of the Chatham House Prize "in recognition of her personal leadership in driving a new era of US diplomatic engagement and for her particular focus on promoting education and rights for women and girls"
- On September 10, 2013, the National Constitution Center awarded Clinton the 2013 Liberty Medal for her positions in public service and for her advocacy efforts towards more rights for women and girls worldwide.
- On September 13, 2013, the University of St Andrews conferred an honorary Doctor of Law degree onto her in recognition of her "roles as politician, diplomat and champion of education, human rights, democracy, civil society, and opportunities for women and girls around the world."
- Beginning in February 2014, the annual Hillary Rodham Clinton Awards for Advancing Women in Peace and Security have been given by the Georgetown Institute for Women, Peace and Security, of which Clinton is the Honorary Founding Chair.
- On May 3, 2014, Hillary Rodham Clinton received the Order of Lincoln, the highest award of the State of Illinois, where she was born and raised.
- On September 23, 2014, Clinton was awarded the Order of the Three Stars 2nd Class, the highest state award of Latvia.
- On December 16, 2014, Clinton received a Ripple of Hope Award from the Robert F. Kennedy Center for Justice and Human Rights.
- In 2014, Clinton was named by Glamour magazine as one of "The 75 Most Important Women of the Past 75 Years."
- On March 3, 2015, Clinton accepted the "We Are Emily" award from Emily's List.
- On March 16, 2015, Clinton was inducted into the Irish America Hall of Fame.
- On June 4, 2015, Clinton received the first Barbara Jordan Public-Private Leadership Award, named in honor of Congresswoman Barbara Jordan and given to "a deserving woman anywhere in the world who has made the highest achievement during the preceding year or years in any honorable field of human endeavor in the public or private sector."
- On November 19, 2015, Clinton received the first Mario M. Cuomo Visionary Award.
- In June 2016, a bust of Clinton was unveiled in the main square of the Albanian city Saranda.

== While private citizen after 2016 presidential election ==
- Georgetown GLOW, an exhibition of art commissioned for the 2016 holiday season, included among other things the artwork "Red, White, and Hillary Blue Diamonds," which was "dedicated to former Senator Hillary Clinton, who is the beacon of dignity and guiding light, as a thank you for her strength as we move forward." This artwork was five diamond-shaped aluminum frames lit up by LED lights, installed in three locations.
- Clinton was named as one of espnW's 2016 IMPACT25 honorees.
- Clinton was named as The Guardian’s Person of the Year 2016.
- In January 2017, the U.S. Diplomacy Center, a museum on American diplomacy, was ceremonially opened; it contains the Hillary Rodham Clinton Pavilion.
- In January 2017, Clinton became the first woman to have a portrait on the walls at the They Also Ran Gallery in Norton, Kansas; this gallery honors people who did not win the presidency.
- In April 2017 she was honored by Planned Parenthood as 'Champion of the Century'.
- On 14 October 2017, she received an honorary Doctor of Laws (LL.D) degree from Swansea University for her role in advancing human rights and acknowledging her Welsh heritage.
- On 14 October 2017, it was announced that Swansea University's College of Law would be renamed the Hillary Rodham Clinton School of Law.
- On 26 October 2017, she was given the first Women's Media Center Wonder Woman Award.
- In November 2017 Clinton received the award for being the Democratic Woman of the Year from the Woman's National Democratic Club.
- In March 2018 it was announced that Clinton would be honored by the Radcliffe Institute for Advanced Study in May 2018 with the Radcliffe Medal, which "honors individuals whose lives and work have had a transformative impact on society."
- In April 2018 Clinton received the inaugural Ida B. Wells Legacy Award from a political action committee formed in tribute to that early feminist and civil rights figure.
- In June 2018, Clinton got an honorary doctorate from Trinity College Dublin.
- On 10 October 2018, she was awarded the Honorary degree of Doctor of Laws from Queen's University Belfast.
- In 2019, Time created 89 new covers to celebrate women of the year starting from 1920; it chose her for 2016.
- On 23 September 2021 she was awarded the honorary doctorate in Civil Law from the University of Oxford.
- On May 18, 2022, she received an honorary Doctor of Laws (LL.D) degree from Columbia University.
- On September 28, 2023, she won the Emmy Award for Outstanding Politics and Government Documentary for In Her Hands at the 44th News and Documentary Emmy Awards.
- On January 4, 2025, she received the Presidential Medal of Freedom from President Joe Biden.

== Multiple instance honors ==
- Clinton was named by Americans in Gallup's most admired man and woman poll as the woman around the world they most admired in 1993–94, 1997–2000, and 2002–17. The win in 2017 was her sixteenth in a row and twenty-second overall. She has held the top spot in the poll longer than any other woman or man in Gallup's history of asking the most admired question.
- Clinton has been ranked on their list of the world's most powerful people by Forbes magazine. She was listed as 5th most powerful in 2004, 26th in 2005, 18th in 2006, 28th in 2008, 36th in 2009, 2nd in 2011, 2nd in 2012, 5th in 2013, 6th in 2014, and 58th in 2015.
- Clinton has been named ten times in Time magazine's Time 100 as one of the 100 most influential people in the world. Years this happened were 2004 (as part of The Clintons), 2006, 2007, 2008, 2009, 2011, 2012, 2014, 2015, and 2016. In addition, in November 2010, Time named Clinton one of the 25 most powerful women of the past century.
- Clinton has been named three times as Barbara Walters' Most Fascinating Person of the year, in 1993, 2003, and 2013.

| Preceded by Common Cents | NY1's New Yorker of the Year; 2008 | Succeeded by Lenny Rosado |
