= Indiana Business Bulletin =

- Discipline: General Business
- Language: English

Publication details
- History: 1994-Present
- Publisher: Center for Business and Economic Research
- Frequency: Weekly

Standard abbreviations
- ISO 4: Indiana Bus. Bull.

Indexing
- OCLC no.: 31520571

Links
- Journal homepage

The Indiana Business Bulletin provides weekly economic analysis, forecasting, and leading economic indicators to the business community, media, and policymakers. The website is published and maintained by the Center for Business and Economic Research in the Miller College of Business at Ball State University.

== See also ==
- Center for Business and Economic Research
