= Common Cents =

US non-profit organization

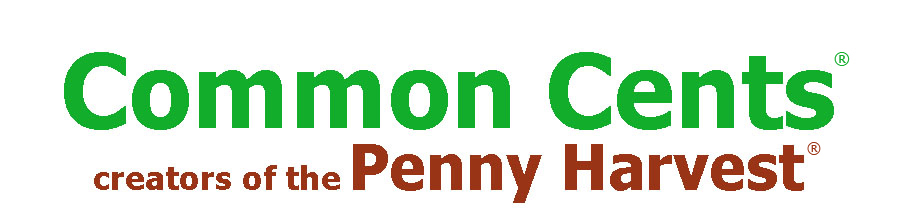
- Company Name: Common Cents
- Founders: Teddy Gross and Nora Gross
- Key People: Teddy Gross and Judith Shapiro
- Founded: 1991
- Location: New York City
- Type: Non-profit
- Website: commoncents.org

Common Cents is a United States educational, not-for-profit organization, which specializes in creating and managing service-learning programs for young people between the ages of four and 14. Common Cent's most popular and best known program is The Penny Harvest, the largest child philanthropy program in the United States. It has EIN 13-3613229 as a 501(c)(3) Public Charity.

Other Common Cents programs include the Student Community Action Fund (a high school leadership council.)

== History ==
Common Cents grew from the desire of a four-year-old Nora Gross (co-founder) to feed a homeless man in 1990. That need led her to ask her father (Teddy Gross Co-founder and executive director), how she could help. In 1990, Teddy Gross and Nora Gross conducted the first Penny Harvest in an effort to collect money to feed and clothe New York City's homeless.

== Awards ==
Common Cents is the winner of the 2007 NY1 New Yorker of the Year award. Common Cents was also shortlisted for the 2007 Carl Bertelsmann's Award.

== Leadership ==
The organization's co-founder and executive director is Teddy Gross.

== Funding ==
Common Cents receives major funding from several major foundations and the government including: The Ford Foundation, Foundation for Jewish Community, JPMorgan Chase, The New York City Council, The New York City Department of Education.

== Board of directors ==
- Judith Shapiro (chair), retired president of Barnard College, New York, New York
- Susan Andersen, professor of psychology, New York University New York, New York
- Margi Booth, president, M. Booth & Associates, Inc., New York, New York
- Elizabeth Campbell, Vice President for Programs, Rockefeller Brothers Fund, New York, New York
- Jonathan Dorfman, Citi Alternative Investments (CAI) - Global Fixed Income, New York, New York
- Gardner Dunnan, New York, New York
- Jon Goldman, Chairman & CEO, iContaqt, Venice, California
- Laird Grant, Retired Managing Director and Senior Portfolio Manager, US Trust Company, New York, New York
- Nora Gross, Co-founder Common Cents, New York, New York; Director, Writing & Media Center, North Lawndale College Prep Charter High School, Chicago, Illinois
- Teddy Gross, Co-founder & Executive Director, Common Cents, New York, New York
- Evelyn Lipper, M.D., Associate Professor of Clinical Pediatrics, Weil Medical College of Cornell University, New York, New York
- Jeanne Mininall, Retired Managing Director & Associate General Counsel, JPMorgan Chase, New York, New York
- Michael Pohly, Portfolio Manager- Fixed Income, Kingdom Capital, New York, New York
- Adam Rich, Senior Government Relations Associate, Law Offices of Claudia Wagner, New York, New York
- James Seuss, CEO, Cole Haan, New York, New York
- Molly Tschang, managing director, International Programs, Cisco Systems, New York, New York

Awards and achievements
Preceded by Tom Frieden	NY1's New Yorker of the Year; 2007	Succeeded by Hillary Rodham Clinton
