= Miller College of Business =

Academic college in Muncie, Indiana, U.S.

Coordinates: 40.2035°N 85.4065°W

- Type: Academic College
- Established: 1965
- Parent institution: Ball State University
- Dean: Cathy L.Z. DuBois, Ph.D.
- Location: Whitinger Business Building, Muncie, Indiana
- Architect: James Associates
- Website: www.bsu.edu/cob

The Miller College of Business is the business college of Ball State University in Muncie, Indiana. The college is named in honor of Wallace T. Miller Jr. for his substantial donation to the university.

== Research centers ==
The Miller College of Business has one stand-alone research center and four centers integrated into various academic departments. The Center for Business and Economic Research, directed by Michael J. Hicks provides public policy and economic research in Indiana and the Midwest. The Entrepreneurship Center led by Matthew Marvel is a top ten entrepreneurship center nationally and offers a minor in entrepreneurship. The Center for Professional Selling offers undergraduate and graduate degree programs in sales, the Center for Actuarial Science and Risk Management directed by Steven Avila is a collaboration between the Department of Finance and Insurance and the Department of Mathematical Sciences. The college also features the A. Umit Taftali Center for Capital Markets and Investing.

== Notable alumni ==
- Angela Ahrendts, former CEO, Burberry, current Senior Vice President of Retail and Online Stores, Apple Inc.
- Kent C. Nelson, former chairman and CEO, UPS
- John Schnatter, founder, spokesman, chairman and CEO of Papa John's International
