= Stephen Bernard Libby =

American physicist

Stephen B. Libby
- Born: United States
- Education: Princeton University; Harvard University
- Scientific career
- Fields: Theoretical Physics
- Workplaces: Lawrence Livermore National Laboratory
- Doctoral advisor: David J. Gross

Stephen Bernard Libby is an American theoretical physicist and the Theory and Modeling Group Leader in the Physics Division at Lawrence Livermore National Laboratory. He is a Fellow of the American Physical Society. He is known for the application of quantum field theory to diverse systems including perturbative quantum chromodynamics and transport in the quantum Hall effect, as well as inventing computational algorithms for radiation driven kinetics in plasmas, and the invention of novel short wavelength laser applications.

== Education and career ==
Libby received his B.A. from Harvard University in 1972, and his Ph.D. in physics from Princeton University in 1977 where he was a student of David Gross. He then became a postdoc at the C. N. Yang Institute for Theoretical Physics at Stony Brook University, and subsequently, worked as a Research Assistant Professor at Brown University. While at Brown, he worked on quantum chromodynamics and factorization theorems with George Sterman as well as quantum theory of Hall effect with Herbert Levin, Aad Pruisken, Robert B. Laughlin and others. In 1986, Libby joined Lawrence Livermore National Laboratory where he worked in applied physics department, developing x-ray laser research. From 1992 to 1994, Libby served as Consulting Professor at Stanford University and then became a member of the National Research Council of its "Rare Isotope Science" Committee.

== Honors ==
- Putnam Fellowship – Princeton University – 1972, 1973
- Fellow of the American Physical Society – 1999
- DOE Defense Programs Excellence Award – 2014

== Published books ==
- 2008: Edward Teller Centennial Symposium: Modern Physics and the Scientific Legacy of Edward Teller (co-editor), ISBN 978-9812837998, doi:10.1142/7154
- 2017: Advances in the Computational Sciences, Proceedings of the Symposium in Honor of Dr Berni Alder's 90th Birthday (co-editor), ISBN 978-9813209411, doi:10.1142/10432
