= Resummation =

Technique to acquire finite results from divergent series

In mathematics and theoretical physics, resummation is a procedure to obtain a finite result from a divergent sum (series) of functions. Resummation involves a definition of another (convergent) function in which the individual terms defining the original function are rescaled, and an integral transformation of this new function to obtain the original function. Borel resummation is probably the most well-known example. The simplest method is an extension of a variational approach to higher order based on a paper by R.P. Feynman and H. Kleinert. Feynman and Kleinert's technique has been extended to arbitrary order in quantum mechanics and quantum field theory.

== See also ==
- Perturbation theory
- Perturbation theory (quantum mechanics)

== Books ==
- Hagen Kleinert and V. Schulte-Frohlinde (2001), Critical Properties of φ^{4}-Theories, Singapore: World Scientific, ISBN 981-02-4658-7 (paperback), especially chapters 16-20.
