= Teddy Gross =

- Born: 1949 (age 76–77)

Teddy Gross (Theodore Faro Gross) (born 1949) is a playwright, author, journalist, and editor, and is the founder (1991) and executive director of Common Cents, a national not-for-profit educational organization, which specializes in designing citizenship programs for children and young people, and supporting their work in schools throughout America. Common Cents organizes The Penny Harvest, which has become the largest child-philanthropy program in the United States. Gross was the editor of Boston After Dark and the longtime editor of the newspaperThe Boston Phoenix. His work was regularly published by Common Cents. The work of Common Cents has been documented in 50 Ways to Help Your Community (1994, Doubleday) and Tell Me a Mitzvah (Kar-Ben Pub, 1993). He has also done many workshops with the New York Theatre Workshop.

== Plays for the Theatre ==
- Red Square, Seattle Repertory Theatre. Daniel Sullivan, director, 1987.
- Crossfire. Off Broadway, Double Image Theatre. Max Mayer, director, 1984; Denver Theatre Center, 1984; Center Stage, Baltimore, 1983; New Voices Series, Seattle Repertory Theatre, 1983; Virginia Stage, summer residency, 1983.
- Lost & Found: A Play for Children. Commissioned by Santa Fe Theatre Festival, 1981; Berkshire Theatre Festival, 1983; productions in translation in Frankfurt, Stuttgart, Esslingen, Vienna elsewhere.
- Fire at Luna Park. Magic Theatre, San Francisco. 1982; published in Kenyon Review, 1983.
- Eugene O'Neill National Playwrights Conference, 1979,1981.

== Book and Recordings for Children ==
- Everyone Asked About You. Putnam & Grosset, NY, 1990; Macmillan paperback, 1993.
- Sing Me a Story, Bob McGrath songs. Video Treasures. 1995.
