= Eric D'Hoker =

Belgian-American theoretical physicist

Eric D’Hoker (born 18 October 1956 in Belgium) is a Belgian-American theoretical physicist.

== Biography ==
D’Hoker studied from 1974 to 1975 at Paris 13 University in Orsay, from 1975 to 1976 at the Lycée Condorcet, and from 1976 to 1978 at the École Polytechnique. In 1978 he became a graduate student in physics at Princeton University, where in 1981 he received his Ph.D. with future Nobel Laureate David Gross as his advisor. As a postdoc, D'Hoker worked from 1981 to 1984 at the Center for Theoretical Physics at Massachusetts Institute of Technology. He then worked an assistant professor from 1984 to 1986 at Columbia University and from 1986 to 1988 at Princeton University. In 1988, D'Hoker became an associate professor at the University of California, Los Angeles (UCLA). He was appointed a full professor in 1990 and a distinguished professor in 2009.

From the 1980s onwards, he collaborated extensively with mathematician Duong H. Phong on the geometry underlying superstring perturbation theory, among other topics in the mathematics of supersymmetry and superstring theory. Another topic of D'Hoker's research is integrable systems.

In 1997, D'Hoker spent time at the Institute for Advanced Study. He has held visiting positions at several academic institutions, including the University of California, Santa Barbara, Kyoto University, and CERN. From 1998 to 2001, he served as President of the Aspen Center for Physics. In 2005, he was elected fellow of the American Physical Society for his "contributions to Quantum Field Theory and String Theory, including string perturbation theory, supersymmetric Yang-Mills theory and AdS-CFT correspondence".

In 1996 he married Jody Enders. In 2004 he became a U.S. citizen.

== Selected publications ==
- with Phong: Multiloop amplitudes for the bosonic Polyakov string, Nucl. Phys. B, vol. 269, 1986, pp. 205–234 doi:10.1016/0550-3213(86)90372-X
- with Phong: Loop amplitudes for the fermionic string, Nucl. Phys. B, vol. 278, 1986, pp. 225–241 doi:10.1016/0550-3213(86)90210-5
- with Phong: On determinants of Laplacians on Riemann surfaces, Communications in Mathematical Physics, vol. 104, 1986, pp. 537–545 doi:10.1007/BF01211063
- with Phong: The geometry of string perturbation theory, Reviews of Modern Physics, vol. 60, 1988, pp. 917–1065 doi:10.1103/RevModPhys.60.917
- with Phong: Seiberg-Witten theory and integrable Systems, Lectures delivered at Edinburgh and Kyoto, Arxiv 1999
- with Phong: Lectures on supersymmetric Yang-Mills theory and integrable systems, in: Yvan Saint-Aubin, Luc Vinet (eds.): Theoretical physics at the end of the twentieth century, CRM Summer School, Banff, Springer 2002, pp. 1–125
- with Phong: Two-loop superstrings.: I. Main formulas, Phys. Lett. B, vol. 529, 2002, pp. 241–255 doi:10.1016/S0370-2693(02)01255-8
- with Phong: Lectures on two loop superstrings, Hangzhou, Peking 2002, Arxiv
