= Michael J. Hicks =

American economist

- Born: August 8, 1962 (age 64)

Academic background
- Education: University of Tennessee (Ph.D., M.A.); Virginia Military Institute (B.A.)

Academic work
- Discipline: Regional economics, macroeconomics
- School or tradition: New Keynesian economics
- Institutions: Ball State University, Center for Business and Economic Research

Michael J. Hicks (born in 1962) is the George & Frances Ball Distinguished Professor of Economics and director of the Center for Business and Economic Research and Professor of Economics at Ball State University.

== Early life and military career ==
Hicks graduated from Langley High School in McLean, Virginia and the Virginia Military Institute. He served as an active duty infantry officer with the 26th Infantry Regiment, 7th Infantry Regiment and Division Tactical and Assault Command Posts of the 24th Infantry Division (Mechanized). He left active duty as a captain and served as a reserve officer, retiring as a lieutenant colonel. Major General Mark Hicks, USAF is his brother.

== Academic career ==
In 1998, he received a Ph.D. from University of Tennessee. Hicks held academic positions at the University of Tennessee, Marshall University and the Air Force Institute of Technology.

=== Quality of Life ===
Hicks is coauthor of several studies of quality of life, notably that of micropolitan area, business dynamism and rural-urban differences in quality of life. This work links quality of life to local economic outcomes, most notably population growth.

=== Appalachian coal and environment ===
Hicks authored several studies of the coal industry and the impact of federal environmental policy on coal production and the West Virginia economy. Hicks and two other co-authors developed a clean water financing plan for West Virginia which ultimately became the Special Reclamation Fund. This fund was financed by a combination of a 7 cent tax per ton of coal, with a secondary 7 cent phase-out tax. This was designed to provide water treatment funds for abandoned coal mines. This remains the largest state level water treatment trust fund in the United States.

Governor Bob Wise (D) appointed Hicks to the Fund commission, where, after approval by the West Virginia State Senate he served from 2003 to 2006.

In 2002 Hicks testified in a court case in Boone County, West Virginia that would eventually culminate in one of the most celebrated recent cases before the U.S. Supreme Court Caperton v. Massey. This case became inspiration for the John Grisham Novel "The Appeal."

Burton and Hicks also provided testimony to the U.S. Senate Committee on Environment and Public Works, Subcommittee on Clean Air, Wetlands and Climate Change, regarding the fiscal and economic effects of mining restrictions. This committee meeting also featured an appearance by one of the Backstreet Boys which prompted several committee members to walk out of the hearing. Burton and Hicks also served as consultants to the National Academies of Science review of the economic consequences of the coal slurry spill in eastern Kentucky.

=== West Virginia Workers' Compensation controversy ===
A 2001 study co-authored by Hicks found little negative economic consequences of West Virginia's Workers' Compensation rates on the overall economy. This report sparked much criticism from the West Virginia Chamber of Commerce and unleashed a series of op-Ed pieces and a letter writing campaign to state newspapers. The public debate culminated in an editorial in the Charleston Gazette criticizing the Chamber's attack on the Marshall University research team. However, the chair of the West Virginia Chamber of Commerce wrote to Marshall University President Dan Angel, demanding that Dr. Hicks' tenure be revoked as a consequence of this study. Hicks was not tenured at the time. He received tenure in 2004.

=== Hurricane and flood damages ===
Mark Burton and Michael Hicks developed models of flood damages from data collected on the Great Flood of 1993. These were used to simulate flood damages on the Mississippi and Tennessee Rivers. In September 2005, Burton and Hicks used this model to estimate damages from Hurricane Katrina. Subsequently, both participated in the Interagency Performance Evaluation Task Force which reviewed the response to the Hurricane. In 2008 Ball State University released studies onfloods in Indiana and Iowa. In 2010 Burton and Hicks were asked by the Army Corps of Engineers to provide an estimate of flood damages for the Pakistan Flood of 2010.

=== Local government consolidation ===
Hicks is co-author with Dagney Faulk of a book on local government consolidation. This book developed from work on local government consolidation study teams authored by former governor Joe Kernan and Supreme court Justice Randy Shepard. The book was published in January 2011. Indiana's governor Mitch Daniels wrote the foreword to the book.

In 2011 Faulk and Hicks completed two studies on government consolidation (local governments and school districts in New Jersey).

=== Wal-Mart and local economies ===
Hicks was an early researcher of Wal-Mart's impact on communities, and since 1999 has published several papers and a book on the economic impact of Walmart. Along with Kristy Wilburn, Hicks published the first econometric study to address the endogeneity of firm location decision related to Wal-Mart. Subsequent to this, Hicks appeared in a November 2005 Global Insight conference on Wal-Mart's impact which received significant national attention. These papers were later published, along with a book. Hicks' work has been frequently cited in the academic literature, media and advocacy groups.

== Economic columnist ==
Hicks writes a weekly economics column, which is syndicated in more than two dozen Indiana newspapers.

== Awards ==
Hicks is a Distinguished Fellow of the Mid-Continent Regional Science Association, was awarded Marshall University's Distinguished Artist and Scholar Award (with Mark L. Burton), as well as the Graduate Student Teaching Award at Tennessee's College of Business, and awards from the Air Force Institute of Technology's student association and Ball State's Miller College of Business.

In 2008 the Center for Business and Economic Research at Ball State University received the Association for University Business and Economic Research Award for its Manufacturing Scorecard. In 2009 the Center won a then-unprecedented three awards from AUBER for a research study, county profiles and promotional materials.

The United States Army Corps of Engineers awarded Hicks the Commander's Award for Civilian Service for his efforts in support of the Interagency Performance Evaluation Team (IPET) and Task Force Guardian, Task Force Hope and the New Orleans District following Hurricane Katrina.

During his time in the Army, Hicks was awarded the Bronze Star Medal, the Army Commendation Medal, and Southwest Asia Service Medal with two Battle Stars.
