= Center for Business and Economic Research =

Coordinates: 40.2033°N 85.4063°W

- Abbreviation: CBER
- Formation: 1965 (Bureau of Business Research)
- Purpose: Policy Forecasting and Research
- Headquarters: Muncie, Indiana
- Region served: United States, Indiana
- Director: Michael J. Hicks
- Parent organization: Ball State University
- Staff: 22 (2009)
- Website: http://www.bsu.edu/cber

The Center for Business and Economic Research (CBER), formerly the Bureau of Business Research, is an economic policy and forecasting research center housed within the Miller College of Business at Ball State University in Muncie, Indiana, USA. CBER research encompasses health care, public finance, regional economics, transportation, and energy sector studies. In addition to research, CBER serves as the forecasting element in the Muncie area – hosting five state and federal economic forecasting roundtables.

== History ==
The Center for Business and Economic Research was founded the late 1960s as the Bureau of Business Research at Ball State University. The founding was initiated by Dr. Robert P. Bell soon after being hired as the first dean of the College of Business. Dr. Joseph Brown from the University of Georgia became the first director of the bureau. The focus of the bureau was to look for research opportunities and provide faculty with help pursuing those opportunities. Also, focus was placed on using faculty in applied business research.

The focus of the center has changed significantly since its inception. An official name change from the Bureau of Business Research to the Center for Business and Economic Research occurred in 2008. Currently, the center works in the community through services of economic policy research, national, state, and local forecasting, and data analysis.

== Recent studies ==
CBER regularly releases studies and publications on various topics including health care, public finance, regional economics, transportation, and energy.

Study Name	Publication Date
Labor Markets After the Great Recession: Unemployment and Policy for Indiana	March 2013
Which Hoosier Occupations May Suffer from a Skills Gap?	2013
Indiana Migration Flows	February 2013
Public Transportation in Indiana: An Analysis of Ridership Surveys	January 2013
The Effect of Gasoline Prices on Public Bus Ridership in Indiana	January 2013
Fixed Route and Demand-Response Systems: Funding Methods, Benefits, and Costs in Indiana	January 2013
Economic Forecast for 2013: East Central Indiana & Southeast Indiana	December 2012
2012 Holiday Retail Sales Forecast	November 2012
Manufacturing: Elkhart County, Indiana	October 2012
The Relative Tax Burden of Indiana's Business: A Micro-Simulation of State Tax Liabilities	September 2012
2012 Manufacturing and Logistics Report: National Report & Indiana Report	June 2012
Indiana Community Asset Inventory and Rankings 2012	April 2012
Special Districts and Local Government Reform	February 2012
Gasoline Prices: An Update	February 2012
The Effect of State-Level Add-On Legislation to the Federal New Market Tax Credit Program	February 2012
Home Health Care Industry Growth in Indiana	January 2012
Right-to-Work Legislation and the Manufacturing Sector	January 2012
The Indiana Econometric Model: 2012 Economic Forecast	December 2011
Indiana Toll Road Economic Development Corridor Initiative	November 2011
To Collect Sales Tax or Not? Indiana's Ecommerce Conundrum	November 2011
The Puzzle of Indiana's Economy through the Great Recession	2011
Analysis of Government Functions & Analysis of Public School Districts	October 2011
An Examination of the Economic Impact of Property Tax Levy Caps on Economic Activity in New Jersey	October 2011
The Economic Impact of the Super Bowl in Indianapolis	October 2011, March 2008
A Technical Analysis of the Economic Impact of U.S. Department of Defense Contracts in Indiana	September 2011
2011 Holiday Retail Sales Forecast	September 2011
An Analysis of the Short Run Effects of the American Jobs Act	September 2011
Foster Care Cost Survey of Indiana	August 2011
Manufacturing Trends: Madison County, Ind., 1973 - 2009	July 2011
Manufacturing Trends: Delaware County, Ind., 1969 - 2009	July 2011
Educational Attainment in Indiana	July 2011
Public vs. Private Investment in College: An Exploratory Analysis	June 2011
2011 Manufacturing and Logistics Report: National Report & Indiana Report	June 2011
Preliminary Flood Damage Estimates for the Memphis, Tennessee, MSA	May 2011
U.S. Export Adaptability at the State Level	May 2011
Local Option Income Taxes in Indiana	March 2011
The Effects of Higher Fuel Prices on Indiana's Economy	January 2011
Reflections on State Tax Incentives	December 2010
2010 Holiday Retail Sales Forecast	November 2010
Media in the Workplace: An Analysis of the Video Consumer Mapping Study Data	August 2010
Preliminary Damage Estimates for Pakistani Flood Events, 2010	August 2010
Comprehensive Examination of the Performance of the Indiana 21st Century Research and Technology Funds	September 2010
Indiana's Manufacturing Employment Trends	July 2010
The Economic Effects of Indiana's Property Tax Rate Limits	February 2010
Who Lost Jobs When the Minimum Wage Rose?	February 2010
Intrastate Distribution of State Government Revenues and Expenditures in Indiana	January 2010
Business Brief: Trends in Employment and Earnings in Delaware County	January 2010
Cluster Analysis of Key Sectors: Boone County and Surrounding Areas	December 2009
Some Preliminary Evaluation of the Cash for Clunkers Program	November 2009
A Forecasting Mea Culpa – Maybe?	October 2009
The 2009 Holiday Retail Sales Forecast	November 2009
The Indiana State Fair: 2008 Economic Impact and 2009 Projections	October 2009
Cultural Tourism in Indiana: The Impact and Clustering of the Arts and Creative Sectors in This Recession	May 2009
2009 Manufacturing and Logistics Report Card	February 2009
Local Government Reform in Indiana	January 2009
Tourism-Related Commerce in Indiana	January 2009
Did the Increase in Minimum Wage Cause Our Unemployment Rate to Rise?	September 2008
Understanding the Sub-Prime Markets: A Narrative	October 2008
Understanding Regional Poverty: What is Poverty?	September 2008
New Media, Information Technology and Indiana: A Retrospective on the 2000 Battelle Study	January 2009
2008 National Manufacturing and Logistics Report Card	May 2008

== Publications ==
=== American Journal of Business ===
CBER houses the managing office of the American Journal of Business, a peer-reviewed journal that publishes articles aimed at improving business practices or enhancing instructional efforts through application, transfer, and interpretation of knowledge.

=== Indiana Business Bulletin ===
CBER also publishes the online publication, Indiana Business Bulletin (IBB). The IBB provides weekly economic analysis, forecasting, and leading economic indicators to the business community, media, and policymakers.

== Awards and recognitions ==
- 2009 Association for University Business and Economic Research (AUBER) Award of Excellence in Websites for CBER Data Center – County Profiles
- 2009 AUBER Award of Excellence in Newsletters, Brochures and Other Promotional Materials for CBER Open House
- 2009 AUBER Award of Excellence in Special Studies, Technical or Contract Reports for Local Government Reform in Indiana
- 2008 AUBER Award of Excellence in Electronic Publications for State of Manufacturing and Logistics in Indiana
