= Indian Institute of Science Education and Research, Pune =

Public Research University located in Pune, Maharashtra

Indian Institute Science Education and Research, Pune
- Motto: Where Tomorrow's Science Begins Today
- Type: Public university
- Established: 2006; 20 years ago
- Affiliations: Institutes of National Importance
- Budget: ₹198.31 crore (US$21 million) (FY2024–25 est.)
- Chairperson: Madabhushi Madan Gopal, IAS
- Director: Sunil Bhagwat
- Academic staff: 133 (2025)
- Students: 2,055 (2025)
- Undergraduates: 1,079 (2025)
- Postgraduates: 259 (2025)
- Doctoral students: 717 (2025)
- Location: Pune, Maharashtra, India
- Campus: Urban 98 acres
- Website: www.iiserpune.ac.in

Directors
- K N Ganesh, 2006–2017; Jayant B. Udgaonkar, 2017-2023; Sunil S. Bhagwat, 2023–present

Indian Institute of Science Education and Research, Pune (IISER Pune) is an autonomous public university established in 2006. It is one of the seven Indian Institutes of Science Education and Research, and was one of the first IISERs to be established along with IISER Kolkata. It is located in the city of Pune, India.

== Campus ==
The construction of the final campus was completed in 2012. The campus is of 98 acres.

== Academics ==
University rankings

General – India
- NIRF (Overall) (2024): 42
- NIRF (Research) (2024): 29

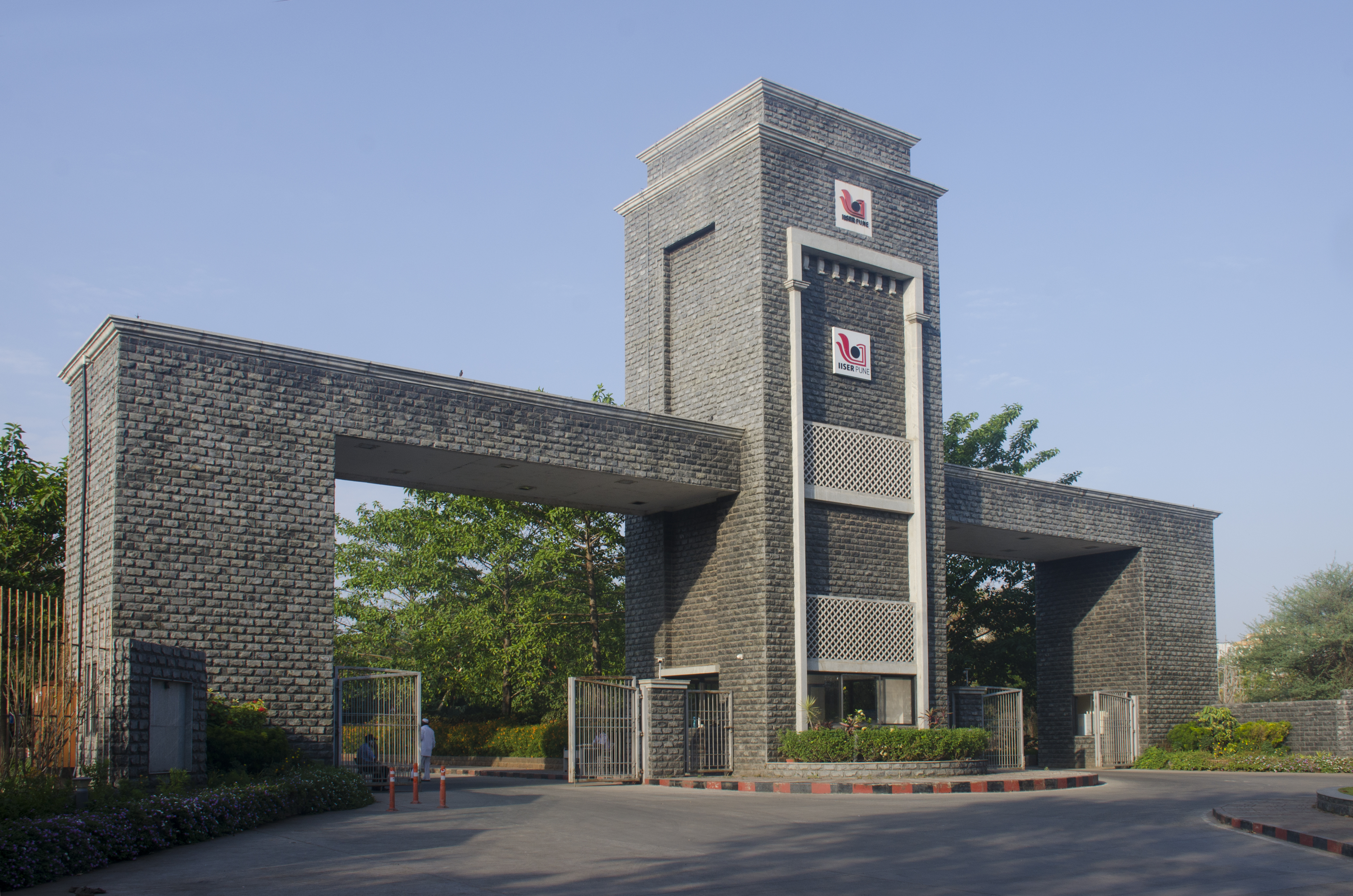
Main Gate, IISER, Pune

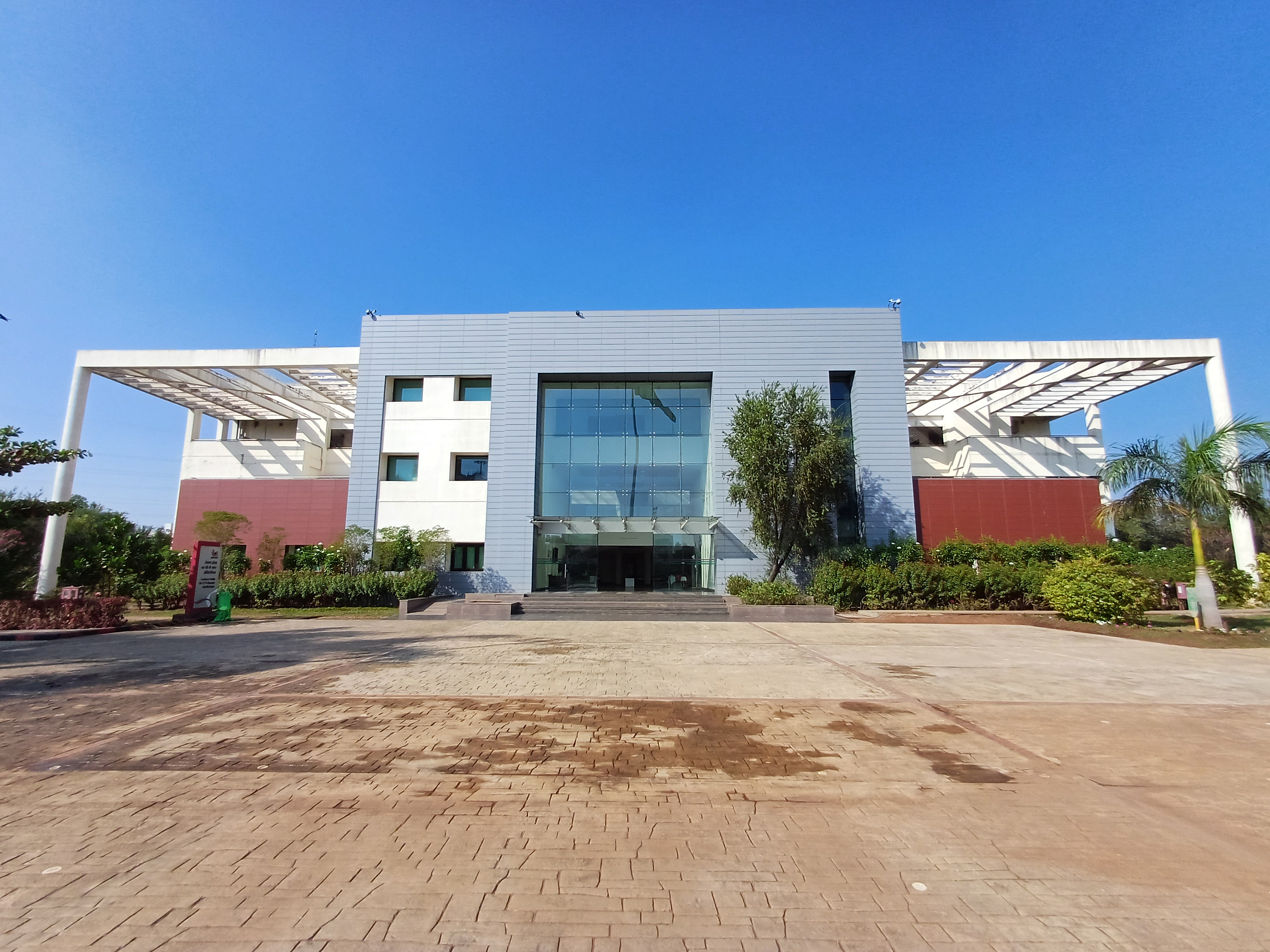
Front view of Lecture Halls and C. V. Raman Auditorium, IISER Pune

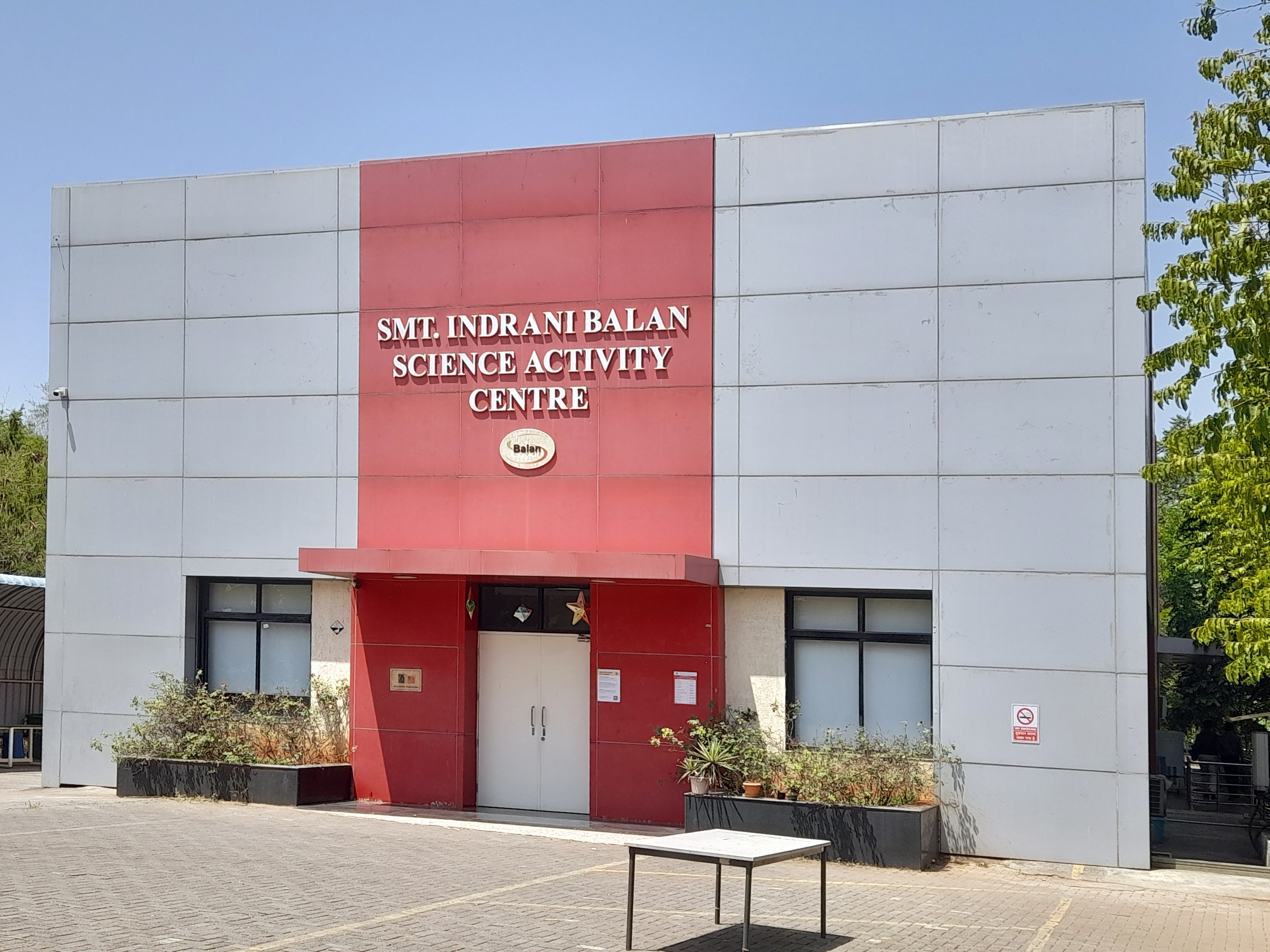
Smt Indrani Balam Science Activity Centre, IISER, Pune.jpg

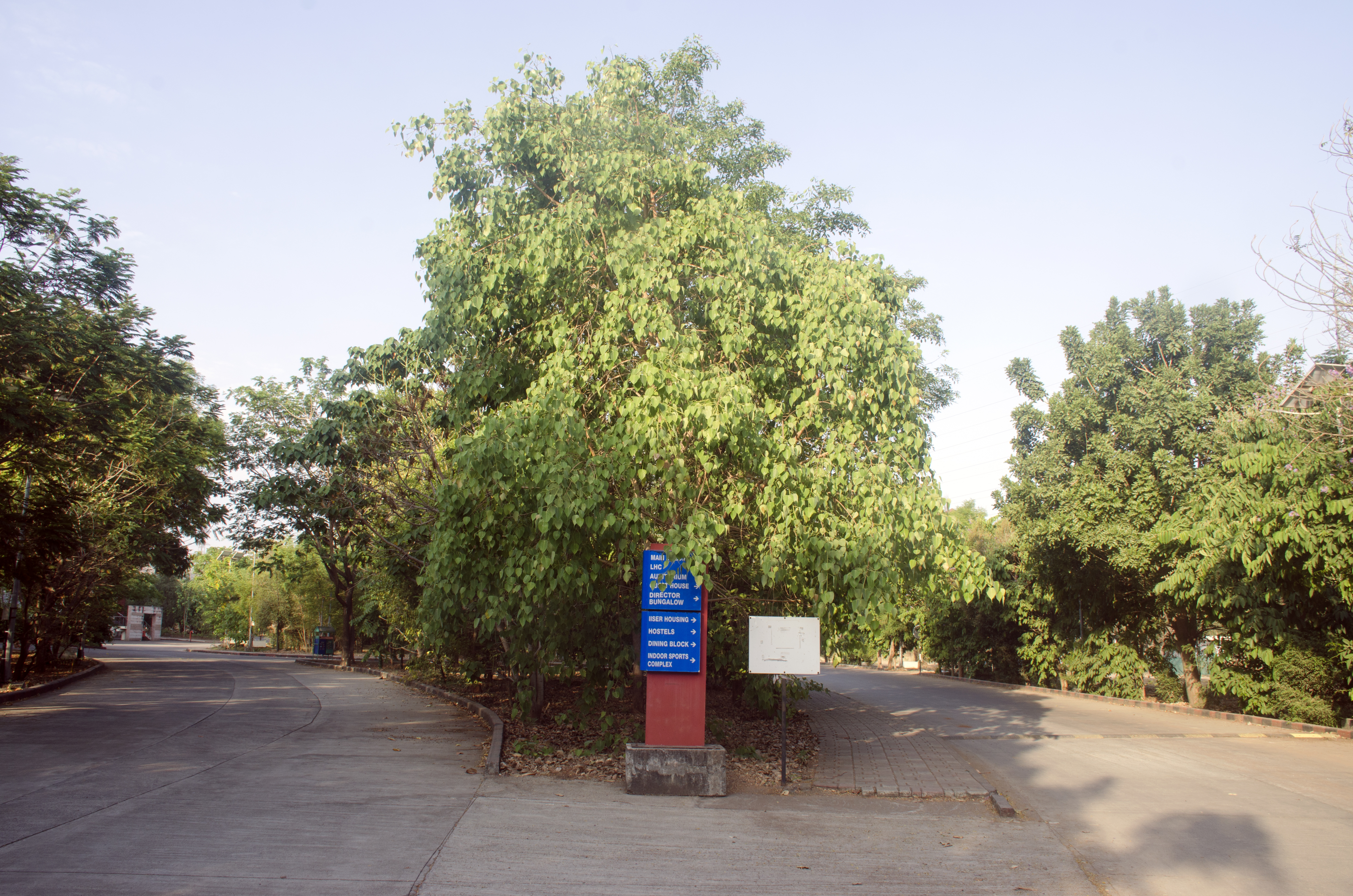
Tree-lined pathways, IISER, Pune

=== Academic programmes ===
IISER Pune offers integrated masters programmes (BS-MS), a Masters by Research (MS), an integrated doctoral programme (Int. PhD) and a doctoral programme (PhD).

Admission to the BS-MS programme is exclusively through the IISER Aptitude Test (IAT) from 2024. JEE Advanced and KVPY are no longer valid channels for admission.

Admission to the various PhD programmes is either with a master's degree in science or with a bachelor's degree, for the integrated PhD programme. Candidates are screened by interviews. In addition to that candidates should have qualified a national level entrance exam for PhD program in science (like GATE)

The faculty is organised by various disciplines such as Biology, Chemistry, Earth and Climate Sciences, Humanities and Social Sciences, Mathematics, and Physics. Interdisciplinary research is encouraged across disciplines. The first batch of students graduated in 2012.

=== Rankings ===
In the 2020 Times Higher Education World University Rankings, IISER Pune is ranked among the top 800 globally and ranked 10 in India. The National Institutional Ranking Framework (NIRF) by the MoE ranked IISER Pune 55th overall and 35th in research in India in 2025.

== Research centres ==
IISER-Pune houses the following advanced research centres/ centres of excellence:

- Centre for Integrative Studies (CIS)
- DBT Centre of Excellence in Epigenetics
- DST Unit on Nanoscience
- Max-Planck Partner Group in Quantum Field Theory
- Max-Planck Partner Group in Glyco-nanotechnology
- National facility for gene function in Health and Disease
- Centre of Excellence in Science and Mathematics Education (CoESME)
- Centre for Energy Science

== Student life ==
The majority of the student activities at IISER-P are conducted by various clubs.

Mimamsa is an intercollegiate science challenge conducted by the students of IISER-P, with the aim to make the quiz conceptually challenging competition at the national level for science students. It is a two-stage affair. The first stage is a written exam with subjective questions from all disciplines of science. The top four colleges selected through this round move into the finals, which are held in the IISER Pune campus.

There is also an active SPIC MACAY sub-chapter, which organizes events jointly with National Chemical Laboratory, and the SPIC MACAY Pune Chapter.

In the last week of October or first week of November, IISER Pune organises its college fest, Karavaan. The fest attracts students from colleges all across Pune, as well as national institutes all over India.

== Administrative Officials ==
- Director: Prof. Sunil S. Bhagwat
- Registrar (In-charge): Umeshkumar Mote
- Sr. Asst. Registrar(Administration): Santosh Nevse

== See also ==
- List of universities in India
- List of autonomous higher education institutes in India
