= Institute of Bioinformatics and Biotechnology =

Scientific research institute in Pune, India

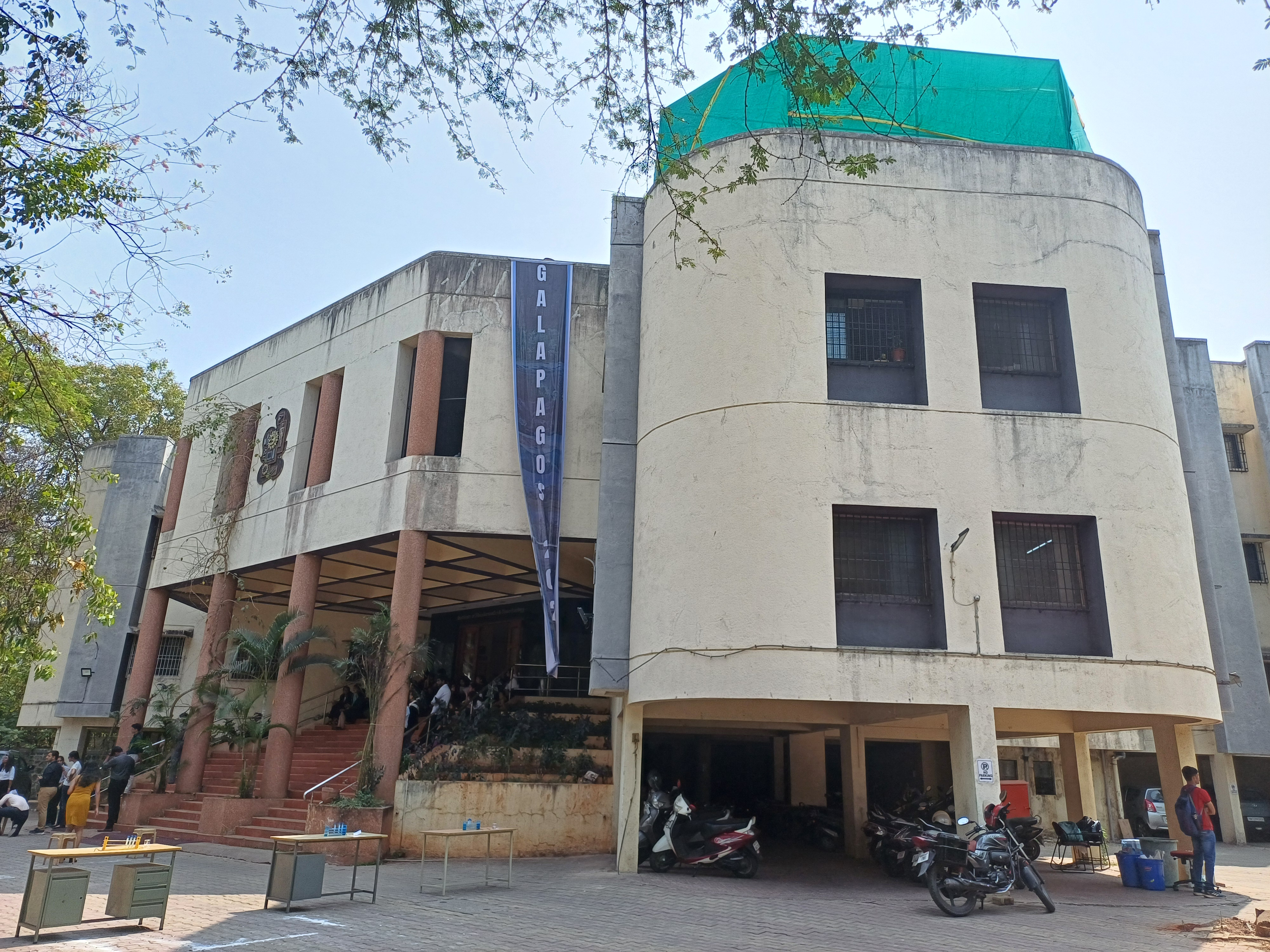
- Established: 2002
- Field of research: Bioinformatics and Biotechnology
- Location: Pune, Maharashtra, India

The Institute of Bioinformatics and Biotechnology (IBB) is an autonomous institute with an affiliation to the University of Pune. It was established in 2002 under the 'University with Potential for Excellence' program funded by the University Grants Commission of India (UGC). It was established with a view to promote research and development activities in bioinformatics and biotechnology, with a focus on creation of high quality research environment and human resources.

IBB is situated on the campus of University of Pune, India. It has been widely regarded that IBB shares the same relationship with the University of Pune as the Center for Excellence in Basic Sciences, Mumbai shares with the University of Mumbai.

== Programs at the Institute ==
In its pursuit of human resource development, IBB has launched two courses at Masters’ level:

- Five years integrated M.Sc. (Biotechnology) / six years M.Tech. (Biotechnology) programme
- Two years M.Sc. (Virology) programme
- Ph.D.
- Post-doctoral programme

== See also ==
- Institute of Genomics and Integrative Biology
