= Tanushree =

- Gender: Female
- Language: Nepali; Sanskrit

Origin
- Meaning: goddess define
- Region of origin: India

Other names
- Related names: Tanushri, Tanusree, Tanusri

Tanushree (Devanagari: तनुश्री) is an Indian feminine given name, which means "beautiful".

== Notable people ==
- Tanusree Chakraborty, Indian Bengali model and actress
- Tanusri Saha-Dasgupta, Indian physicist
- Tanushree Dutta (born 1984), Indian actress and model
- Tanu Roy, Indian actress and model
- Tanusree Sarkar, Indian cricketer
- Tanusree Shankar (born 1956), Indian choreographers and actress
- Tanusri Sengupta, Indian Bengali model and winner of Mrs Bengal Beautiful Eyes
- Tanushree Deb Barma, The first woman IAS Officer of Tripura
