= W. David Arnett =

American astrophysicist

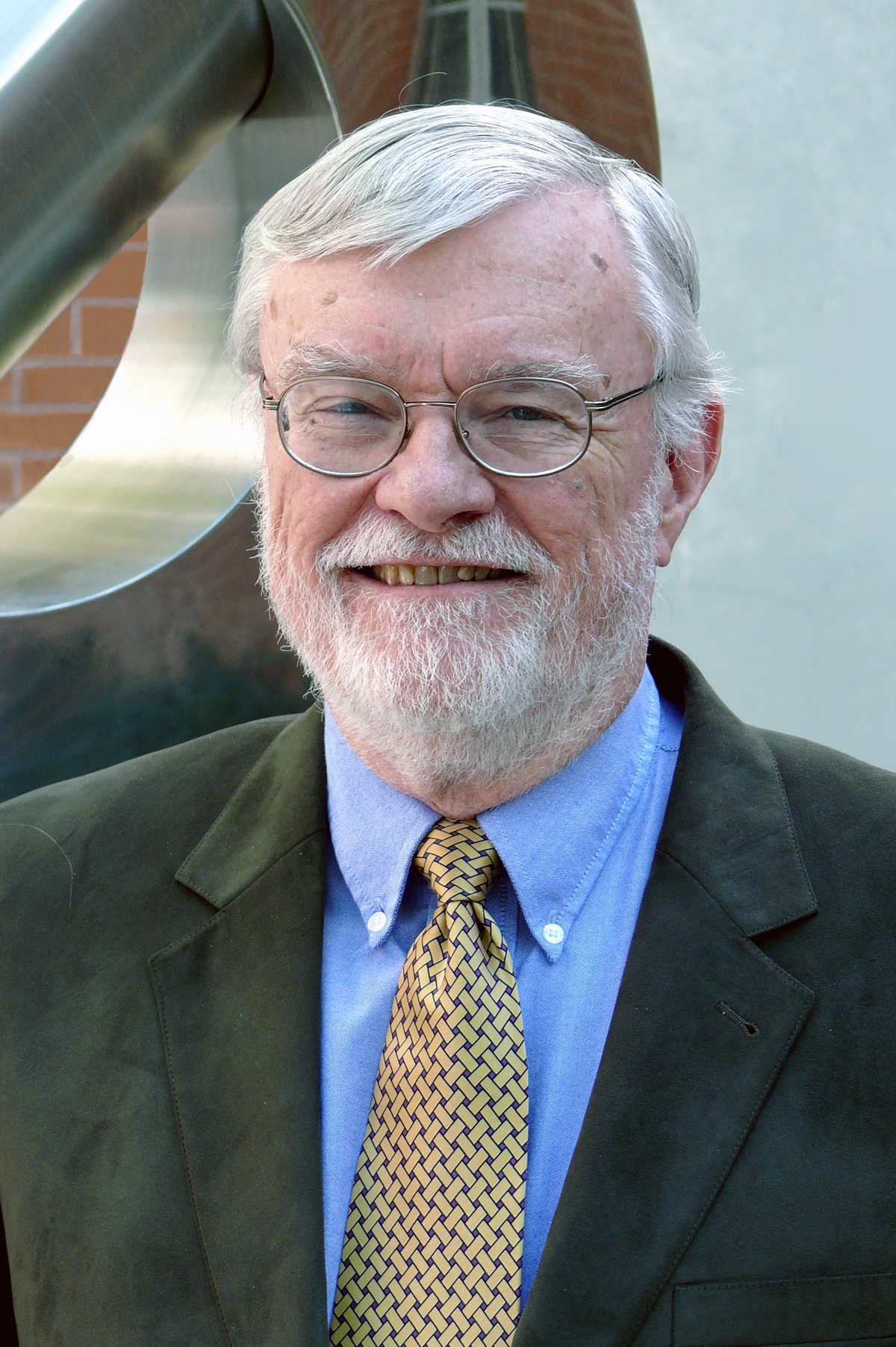
- Arnett in 2008
- Born: 1940 (age 85–86)
- Education: Yale University
- Known for: nuclear astrophysics supernovae
- Awards: Hans Bethe Prize (2009); Henry Norris Russell Lectureship
- Scientific career
- Fields: Astrophysics
- Workplaces: University of Chicago; University of Arizona
- Doctoral advisor: Alastair G. W. Cameron
- Doctoral students: Sandip Chakrabarti

William David Arnett (born 1940) is a Regents Professor of Astrophysics at Steward Observatory, University of Arizona, known for his research on supernova explosions, the formation of neutron stars or black holes by gravitational collapse, and the synthesis of elements in stars; he is author of the monograph Supernovae and Nucleosynthesis which deals with these topics. Arnett pioneered the application of supercomputers to astrophysical problems, including neutrino radiation hydrodynamics, nuclear reaction networks, instabilities and explosions, supernova light curves, and turbulent convective flow in two and three dimensions.

== Academic career ==
Arnett received his BS degree from the University of Kentucky in 1961 and his MS and PhD degrees in physics from Yale University in 1963 and 1965, advised by A. G. W. Cameron. After postdoctoral work with W. A. Fowler at the California Institute of Technology and Fred Hoyle at the Institute of Theoretical Astronomy (now Institute of Astronomy) of Cambridge University, he served briefly on the faculties of Rice University (working with Donald Clayton), University of Texas and University of Illinois before becoming the B. and E. Sunny Distinguished Service Professor at the University of Chicago and then Regents Professor at the University of Arizona.

== Honors and awards ==
- Henry Norris Russell Lectureship of the American Astronomical Society, 2012.
- Marcel Grossmann Award, International Center for Relativistic Astrophysics (ICRA), 2012
- Hans Bethe Prize of the American Physical Society, 2009
- S. Chandrasekhar Lecturer, S.N. Bose National Centre for Basic Sciences, Kolkata, India, 2007
- Fellow of the American Physical Society, 1987
- Member, National Academy of Sciences, 1985
- Member, American Academy of Arts and Sciences, 1985
- Alexander von Humboldt Prize (senior scientist), 1981
- Yale University Distinguished Graduate Award in Physical Sciences and Engineering (with J. W. Truran), 1980
- University of Kentucky Honorary Doctorate of Sciences, 2016
- Fellow of the American Astronomical Society, 2020
