= Rabindranath Mukherjee =

Indian chemist

Professor at Indian Institute of Technology Kanpur
- In office 1987–2012

Director at IISER Kolkata
- In office 2012–2017
- Preceded by: Sushanta Kumar Dattagupta
- Succeeded by: Sourav Pal

Personal details
- Born: 19 April 1953 Tribeni, Hooghly, West Bengal, India
- Died: August 2026 (aged 73)
- Education: University of Calcutta (PhD); University of Burdwan (BSc, MSc)
- Profession: Professor; Chemist

Rabindranath Mukherjee also known as R N Mukherjee (19 April 1953 – August 2026) is an Indian former chemistry professor who is an elected fellow of the Indian National Science Academy. He was former Director of Indian Institute of Science Education and Research, Kolkata.

== Education ==
Mukherjee holds an M.Sc. (Specialization in Inorganic Chemistry) from The University of Burdwan (1976), West Bengal, India obtained his PhD from The Rajabazar Science College, University of Calcutta (1983) working in the laboratory of Prof. Animesh Chakravorty, the then Head, Department of Inorganic Chemistry, Indian Association for the Cultivation of Science (IACS), Calcutta (now Kolkata). After spending two years in the same laboratory as a post-doctoral research associate he joined the research group of Prof. R. H. Holm, Department of Chemistry, Harvard University, USA during May 1985-September 1987.

== Academic background ==
He became a member of the faculty as an assistant professor at the Department of Chemistry, Indian Institute of Technology Kanpur, Kanpur, India in October 1987. Since December 1995 he is a Professor of Chemistry. He was Head of Department of Chemistry, Indian Institute of Technology Kanpur, Kanpur, India.

== Positions ==
1. Post-doctoral Research Associate, Indian Association for the Cultivation of Science (in the laboratory of Professor Animesh Chakravorty), IACS, Calcutta (1983 - 1985)
2. Post-doctoral Research Associate (in the laboratory of Professor Richard H. Holm), Harvard University, USA (1985 - 1987)
3. Assistant Professor, Department of Chemistry IIT Kanpur (1987 - 1993)
4. Associate Professor, Department of Chemistry, IIT Kanpur (1993 - 1995)
5. Professor, Department of Chemistry, IIT Kanpur (1995–; on deputation from 01/02/2012 to 31/01/2017)
6. Head, Department of Chemistry, IIT Kanpur (2010 - )
7. Chair Professor, IIT Kanpur (Poonam and Prabhu Goel Chair) (2011 - 2014)

== Awards and honors ==
1. Chair Professor at Indian Institute of Technology Kanpur, (Poonam and Prabhu Goel Chair) (2011-2014)
2. Priyadaranjan Ray Memorial Award, Indian Chemical Society, Kolkata (2010)
3. J. C. Bose Fellowship, Department of Science & Technology, Government of India (2008-2013)
4. Elected Fellow of Indian National Science Academy, New Delhi, India (2008)
5. Fellow, Indian Academy of Sciences, Bangalore (1999)
6. Silver Medal, Chemical Research Society of India, Bangalore, Bangalore (2011)
7. Vice President, Chemical Research Society of India (2008- )
8. Member, Advisory Board of Dalton Transactions (RSC) (2008-2011)
9. Member, Editorial Board of Inorganica Chimica Acta (Elsevier) (2011-2013)
