= Soumitro Banerjee =

Indian electrical engineer (born 1960)

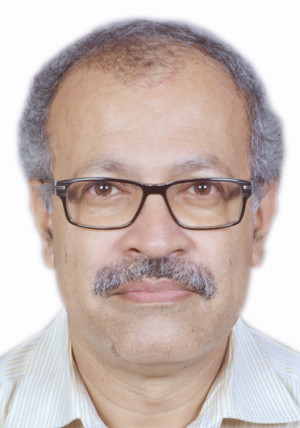
- Born: 17 October 1960 (age 65); Kolkata, West Bengal, India
- Education: IIEST Shibpur; University of Calcutta; IIT Delhi
- Known for: Studies on bifurcation phenomena in switched dynamical systems like power electronic circuits
- Awards: 2003 Shanti Swarup Bhatnagar Prize; 2004 Citation Laureate Award
- Scientific career
- Fields: Bifurcation theory; Nonlinear dynamics
- Workplaces: IIT Kharagpur; IISER Kolkata

Soumitro Banerjee (born 17 October 1960) is an Indian electrical engineer and physicist and former acting Director of the Indian Institute of Science Education and Research, Kolkata. He is known for his studies on border collision bifurcations and nonlinear phenomena in power electronic circuits and is an elected fellow of all three major Indian science academies: the National Academy of Sciences, India, Indian Academy of Sciences, and Indian National Science Academy. He is also a fellow of The World Academy of Sciences, Institute of Electrical and Electronics Engineers, West Bengal Academy of Sciences and the Indian National Academy of Engineering. The Council of Scientific and Industrial Research, the apex agency of the Government of India for scientific research, awarded him the Shanti Swarup Bhatnagar Prize for Science and Technology, one of the highest Indian science awards for his contributions to Engineering Sciences in 2003. (Note: Long link - please select award year to see details)

== Biography ==
Soumitro Banerjee, born on 17 October 1960 at Kolkata in the Indian state of West Bengal, did his graduate studies at Bengal Engineering College of the University of Calcutta from where he earned a BE degree in electrical engineering in 1981 and moved to the Indian Institute of Technology, Delhi to gain an MTech in Energy Studies in 1983. After enrolling for PhD at IIT Delhi, he took up the post of a lecturer at the Indian Institute of Technology, Kharagpur in 1985 and while serving there he received his doctoral degree in 1988 for his thesis, Magnetic Energy Storage Units for Improvement of Power System Stability. He served IIT Kharagpur till 2009 during which period held the positions of an assistant professor (1990–98), associate professor (1998–2003) and a professor. In 2009, he moved to the Indian Institute of Science Education and Research, Kolkata where he serves as a professor.

== Legacy ==
An example of Stick-slip

Banerjee's researches have been focused on nonlinear dynamics and bifurcation theory and his experiments and analyses widened the understanding of border collision bifurcations. He worked on hybrid dynamical systems such as switching electronic circuits and mechanical systems showing impacts or stick-slip phenomenon and demonstrated border-collision bifurcation, a mode of dynamical transition, occurring in those systems. He developed a mathematical theory for elucidating these bifurcations and his studies are known to be in use in various applications. He has also worked extensively on nonlinear phenomena in power electronics. He has documented his researches by way of several articles; (Note: Please see Articles section) Google Scholar and ResearchGate, online article repositories of scientific articles, have listed many of them. Besides, he has made several presentations and has authored three books, Dynamics for Engineers, which details modelling and analysis of dynamical systems, and Wind Electrical Systems, the first Indian book on wind energy conversion, and Research Methodology in Natural Sciences. He has also edited a book, Nonlinear Phenomena in Power Electronics: Bifurcations, Chaos, Control, and Applications, in which he has written a number of chapters.

Banerjee was associated with three journals of the Institute of Electrical and Electronics Engineers; he served as the associate editor of IEEE Transactions on Circuits and Systems II (2003–05), the IEEE Transactions on Circuits and Systems I (2006–07) and the IEEE Circuits & Systems Society Newsletter (2010-2020). He initiated the Conference on Nonlinear Systems and Dynamics (CNSD) and he served as the convenor of the inaugural conference held at IIT Kharagpur campus in December 2003. he has also presented a number of papers at various editions of the conference. He is the general secretary of Breakthrough Science Society, a non-governmental organization committed to the cultivation of a scientific bent of mind among people and sits in the editorial board of its journal. He is also the editor of Prakriti, a Bengali language science magazine. He has sat in the Sectional Committees on Electrical Engineering of such science academies as Indian National Academy of Engineering (2005–07 and 2013–15), Indian National Science Academy (2012–14) and Indian Academy of Sciences (2010–12. He has also been associated with several government agencies which included the Engineering Sciences Research Committee of the Council of Scientific and Industrial Research, Programme Advisory Committee in Electrical, Electronic and Computer Engineering of the Department of Science and Technology (DST), the National Commission on the History of Science, as well as the Board of Members of West Bengal Renewable Energy Development Agency (WBREDA), and a member of the Screening Committee on Engineering for Inspire Faculty Award of the DST.

== Awards and honors ==
Banerjee received the Boyscast Fellowship of the Department of Science and Technology in 1996 which enabled him to carry out collaborative research at the University of Maryland. The Council of Scientific and Industrial Research awarded him the Shanti Swarup Bhatnagar Prize, one of the highest Indian science awards in 2003. The next year, Thomson Scientific included him in the list of top 250 scientists in the world with the highest citation count in the Engineering category and awarded him the 2004 Citation Laureate Award. The same year, the Indian National Academy of Engineering elected him as a fellow and he became a fellow of the Indian Academy of Sciences and the Indian National Science Academy in 2005 and 2007 respectively. He featured in the 2011 fellowship list of the West Bengal Academy of Science and Technology and the elected fellowship of The World Academy of Sciences reached him in 2012, followed by fellowships of the Institute of Electrical and Electronics Engineers in 2013 and the National Academy of Sciences, India in 2014. The Department of Science and Technology selected him for the J. C. Bose National fellowship for two terms, in 2015 and 2020.

== Selected work ==
=== Books ===
- Soumitro Banerjee; George C. Verghese (16 July 2001). Nonlinear Phenomena in Power Electronics: Bifurcations, Chaos, Control, and Applications. Wiley. ISBN 978-0-7803-5383-1.
- Soumitro Banerjee (22 August 2005). Dynamics for engineers. Wiley. ISBN 978-0-470-86843-0.
- S. N. Bhadra; D. Kastha; Soumitro Banerjee (17 November 2005). Wind Electrical Systems. OUP India. ISBN 978-0-19-567093-6.
- Soumitro Banerjee (August 2022). Research Methodology for Natural Sciences, IISc Press, Bengaluru, India. ISBN 978-81-948351-7-2

=== Selected Articles ===
- Banerjee, S.; Parui, S.; Gupta, A. (2005). "Dynamical effects of missed switching in current-mode controlled DC-DC converters". IEEE Transactions on Circuits and Systems II: Express Briefs. 51 (12): 649–654. doi:10.1109/TCSII.2004.838438. S2CID 852566.
- Avrutin, Viktor; Schanz, Michael; Banerjee, Soumitro (2006). "Multi-parametric bifurcations in a piecewise-linear discontinuous map". Nonlinearity. 19 (8): 1875–1906. Bibcode:2006Nonli..19.1875A. doi:10.1088/0951-7715/19/8/007. S2CID 53702500.
- Giaouris, D.; Banerjee, S.; Zahawi, B.; Pickert, V. (2007). "Control of fast scale bifurcations in power-factor correction converters". IEEE Transactions on Circuits and Systems II: Express Briefs. 54 (9): 805–809. CiteSeerX 10.1.1.709.6610. doi:10.1109/TCSII.2007.900350. S2CID 6781365.
- Sharan, Rangoli; Banerjee, S. (2008). "Character of the map for switched dynamical systems for observations on the switching manifold". Physics Letters A. 372 (23): 4234–4240. Bibcode:2008PhLA..372.4234S. doi:10.1016/j.physleta.2008.03.050.
- Rakshit, Biswambhar; Banerjee, Soumitro (2009). "Existence of chaos in a piecewise smooth two-dimensional contractive map". Physics Letters A. 373 (33): 2922–2926. Bibcode:2009PhLA..373.2922R. doi:10.1016/j.physleta.2009.06.025.
- Kapat, S.; Banerjee, S.; Patra, A. (2010). "Bifurcation behavior of a boost converter under voltage controlled pulse skipping modulation in the light of 1-D discontinuous map model". Proceedings of 2010 IEEE International Symposium on Circuits and Systems. pp. 2932–2935. doi:10.1109/ISCAS.2010.5538032. ISBN 978-1-4244-5308-5. S2CID 22448262.
- Kapat, S.; Patra, A.; Banerjee, S. (2011). "Achieving monotonic variation of spectral composition in DC-DC converters using pulse skipping modulation". IEEE Transactions on Circuits and Systems. 58 (8): 1958–1966. doi:10.1109/TCSI.2011.2106052. S2CID 5674834.

=== Presentations ===
- Soumitro Banerjee (2006). "Border Collision and Bifurcation: Theory and Applications" (PDF). International Workshop on Complex Systems and Networks 2006.
- Soumitro Banerjee (2017). "Qualitative Change in Dynamical Status Theory and Open Problems" (PDF). Indian Academy of Sciences.

=== Outreach ===
- Bringing Science to People, The Room of Lives Podcast

== See also ==
- Newton's method
- Lagrange multiplier
- Hamiltonian path problem
- Paul Glendinning
