= S. N. Bose National Centre for Basic Sciences =

Research institute in Kolkata, India

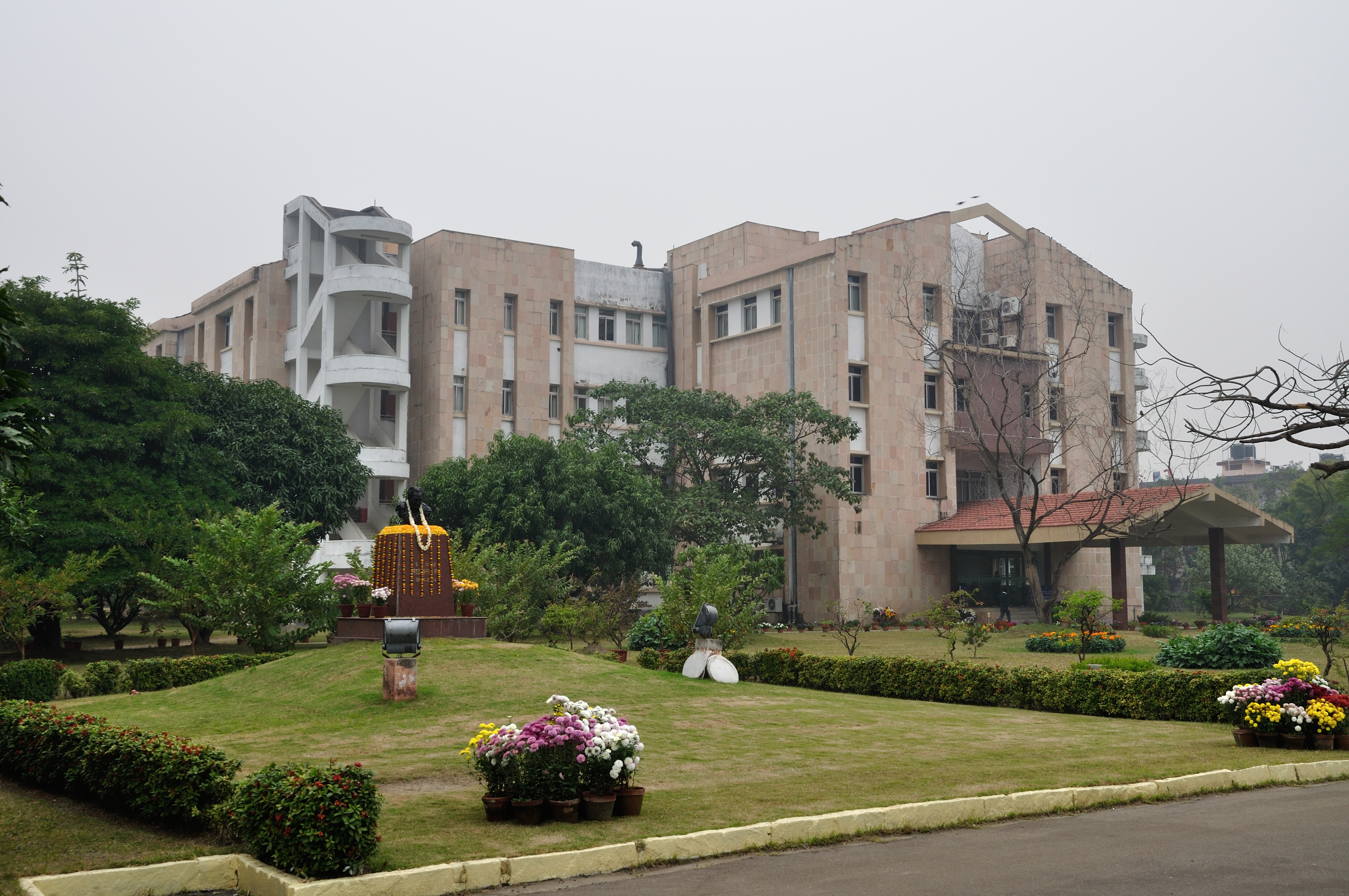
- Main Building of SNBNCBS, Kolkata
- Nickname: SNBNCBS
- Motto: vijñānena paripaśyanti dhīrāḥ
- Established: c. 1986; 40 years ago
- Laboratory type: Autonomous Research center
- Research type: Theoretical and Applied
- Budget: ₹61.91 crore (US$6.4 million) (2025–26)
- Field of research: Astrophysics; Theoretical Sciences; Physics of Complex Systems; Chemical sciences; Biological Sciences; Macromolecular Sciences; Condensed matter; Materials physics
- Director: Tanusri Saha-Dasgupta
- Chairperson: G. D. Yadav
- Location: Bidhannagar, West Bengal, India; 22°34′09″N 88°24′56″E
- Campus: Block-JD, Sector-III, Salt Lake, Kolkata-700106
- Funded by: Department of Science and Technology
- Affiliations: University of Calcutta; Jadavpur University; IISER Kolkata
- Website: www.bose.res.in

S. N. Bose National Centre for Basic Sciences (SNBNCBS) is an autonomous research institute dedicated to basic research in basic sciences under the Department of Science and Technology of Government of India. It is located in West Bengal, Salt Lake, Kolkata. This institute was named after the Indian scientist Satyendra Nath Bose and established in 1986. Chanchal Kumar Majumdar was the founder director of this institute.

As this is a research institute, mainly Ph.D. program is done here. From 2001 Integrated Ph.D. (M.Sc.+Ph.D.) program was started. After completion of two years of study, a M.Sc. degree is given by University of Calcutta. Formerly, this degree was given by West Bengal University of Technology. Students of this institute can submit their Ph.D. thesis to Jadavpur University, the University of Calcutta, Maulana Abul Kalam Azad University of Technology or any other university which allows students to do so.

Directors
- Chanchal Kumar Majumdar, 1987–1999; Sushanta Kumar Dattagupta, 1999–2005; Abhijit Mookerjee, 2005–2006; Arup Kumar Raychaudhuri, 2006–2014; Sibaji Raha, 2014–2015 (In-charge); Santanu Bhattacharya, 2015–2016 (In-charge); Samit Kumar Ray, 2016–2021; Tanusri Saha-Dasgupta, 2021–Incumbent

== History ==
In June 1982 Union Government having decided to setup an institution for research to be dedicated to the hallowed memory of Satyendra Nath Bose and appointed B. D. Pande lead committee.

The commissioning of the PARAM Rudra Supercomputer at SNBNCBS in Kolkata on September 26, 2024, represents a pivotal advancement in the city's computing landscape. This survey note provides a comprehensive examination of its specifications, impact, and broader implications.

== Collaborations ==
In March 2022, the Centre and IIT Bombay established a formal partnership to enhance scientific research and academic exchange. The collaboration focuses on quantum information, materials science, and astrophysics through joint conferences and mobility.

The Joint Ph.D. Programme between SNBNCBS and IISER Kolkata is a collaborative doctoral initiative focusing on interdisciplinary research in physical and chemical sciences. It integrates specialized facilities from both institutions, offering advanced training in condensed matter, materials science, and spectroscopy.

The MoU between SNBNCBS Kolkata and IFW Dresden establishes a bilateral partnership for research into novel magnetic and topological quantum materials. Approved by the Indian Cabinet in 2022, it facilitates joint projects, researcher exchanges, and advanced material characterization, leveraging combined expertise to advance quantum technology and condensed matter physics.

== S.N. Bose Astronomical Observatory ==
The inauguration of the Panchet Hill Observatory in January 2025 marked a pivotal moment for astronomical research in eastern India, establishing the region as a new hub for observational astronomy. Located atop Panchet Hill in the Garpanchakot area of Purulia district, West Bengal. The decision to establish the observatory was made by SNBNCBS in 2014, with land acquisition formalized in 2018. The observatory is strategically located at an elevation of 600 meters above ground level and at a longitude of approximately 86° E, a position that fills a critical gap in global observation networks. Along this longitude, stretching from the Arctic Ocean to Antarctica, observatories are sparse, making Panchet Hill Observatory a major facility.

== Innovation ==
AJO-Neo is a non-invasive medical device developed by the institution for screening neonatal jaundice. Utilizing diffuse reflection spectroscopy, the "no-touch" tool measures bilirubin levels via the infant's nail bed. This painless alternative to blood tests offers rapid results, ensuring safer, infection-free pediatric care.

PathGennie is a computational framework developed by SNBNCBS researchers to accelerate drug discovery. Utilizing unbiased molecular dynamics simulations, it efficiently maps complex molecular pathways and binding kinetics, enabling precise identification of drug-target interactions without the high costs of traditional experimental methods.

== Notable people ==
- Sandip Chakrabarti
- Partha Ghose
- Banibrata Mukhopadhyay, Theoretical Astrophysicist at IISc
- Atanu Nath

== See also ==
- List of colleges in West Bengal
- Education in West Bengal
