= Arup Kumar Raychaudhuri =

Indian physicist (born 1952)

- Born: 1 March 1952 (age 74); West Bengal, India
- Education: 1970–73 Maharaja Sayajirao University of Baroda; 1973–75 Indian Institute of Technology Kanpur; 1975–80 Cornell University; 1980–82 Max Planck Institute for Radio Astronomy
- Known for: Studies on Cryogenics, nano materials
- Awards: 1986 IPA N. S. Satyamurthy Award; 1994 Shanti Swarup Bhatnagar Prize; 1996 MRSI Medal; 2000 ISC Millennium Medal; 2002 MRSI-ICS Gold Medal; 2003 FICCI Award; 2008 INSA Homi Bhaba Medal; The Asiatic Society M.N. Saha Gold Medal
- Scientific career
- Fields: Condensed matter physics; Low temperature physics
- Workplaces: 1982–2004 Indian Institute of Science; 1997–2000 National Physical Laboratory; 2004– S. N. Bose National Centre for Basic Sciences; 2024-&present;UGC DAE CSR Kolkata Centre; Cornell University-(visiting); University of Maryland-(visiting)
- Doctoral advisor: Robert O. Pohl

Arup Kumar Raychaudhuri (born 1 March 1952) is an Indian condensed matter physicist, materials scientist and a Distinguished Emeritus Professor at the S. N. Bose National Centre for Basic Sciences. Known for his pioneering work on the interplay of disorder and interaction, Raychaudhuri is an elected fellow of all the three major Indian science academies viz. Indian Academy of Sciences, National Academy of Sciences, India and Indian National Science Academy as well as the Asia-Pacific Academy of Materials. He is a recipient of a number of awards such as Millennium Medal of the Indian Science Congress, ICS Gold Medal of the Materials Research Society of India and FICCI Award. The Council of Scientific and Industrial Research, the apex agency of the Government of India for scientific research, awarded him the Shanti Swarup Bhatnagar Prize for Science and Technology, one of the highest Indian science awards, for his contributions to physical sciences in 1994. (Note: Long link - please select award year to see details)

== Biography ==
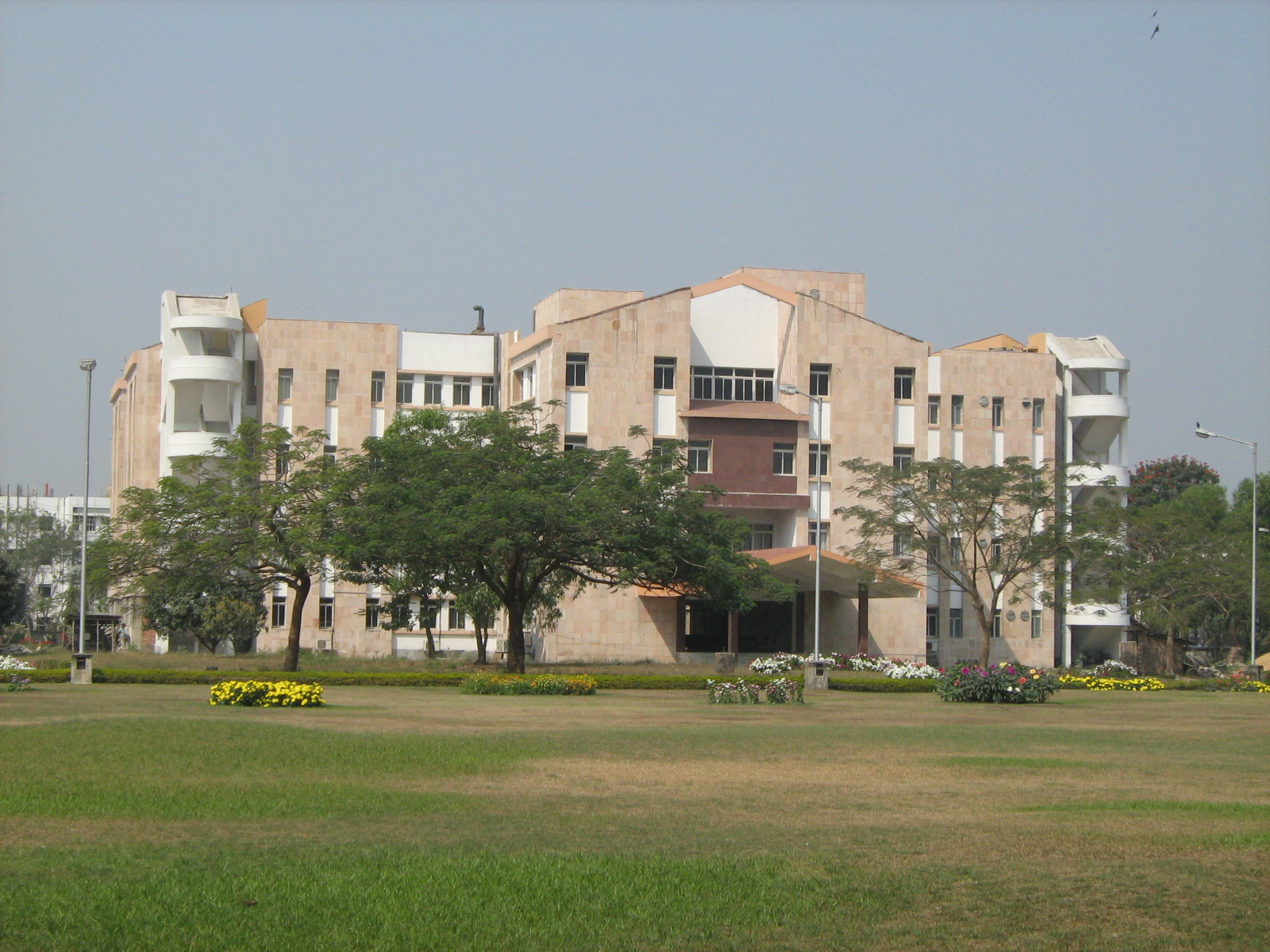
S. N. Bose National Centre for Basic Sciences

Born on 1 March 1952 in the Indian state of West Bengal, Arup Kumar Raychaudhuri completed his BSc from Maharaja Sayajirao University of Baroda in 1973 and MSc from the Indian Institute of Technology, Kanpur in 1975 before proceeding to Cornell University from where he secured a PhD in 1980, working under the supervision of Robert O. Pohl. His post-doctoral studies were at Max Planck Institute for Solid State Research as an Alexander von Humboldt fellow and on his return to India in 1982, he joined the Indian Institute of Science as a lecturer. He continued at IISc until 1997 during which period, he served as an assistant professor and as an associate professor before becoming a professor in 1997. The same year, he moved to the National Physical Laboratory of India as its director on deputation for a three-year stint and returned to IISc in 2000 to resume his duties as a professor. At IISC, he also chaired the Central Cryogenic Facility from 1993 to 1997 and served as the convener of the Integrated PhD Programme from 1994 to 1997. In 2004, he returned to his home state to join S. N. Bose National Centre for Basic Sciences as a senior professor and served as its director from 2006 until his superannuation from service. Post retirement, he continues his association with S. N. Bose National Centre by holding the positions of a Distinguished Emeritus Professor and the Nodal Officer of its Technical Research Center project.

== Legacy ==
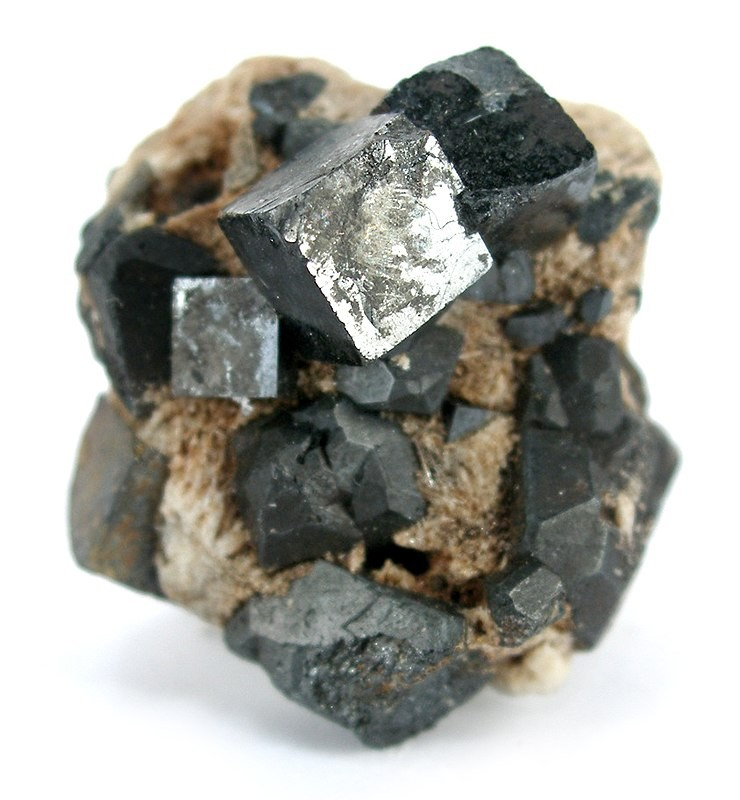
Perovskite crystals

Raychaudhuri's work have mainly been in the disciplines of material science and condensed matter physics, particularly on the physics of transition metal oxides such as perovskite oxides. Glassy state and High Tc superconductor physics and colossal magnetoresistance have been some of his other interests and his research has helped in the elucidation of the interplay of disorder and interaction. Towards the later part of his career, he worked on nanofabrications using nanolithography techniques. He is also credited with the development of an indigenous low temperature scanning tunneling microscope and a host of other experiment equipment. His studies have been documented by way of a number of articles (Note: Please see Selected bibliography section) and the online article repository of the Indian Academy of Sciences has listed 172 of them.

Raychaudhuri is known to have contributed to the development of integrated doctoral programs at IISc as the head of the program during 1994–97. He has served as a member of the Commission on Low Temperature Physics of the International Union of Pure and Applied Physics and 35 doctoral researchers have been mentored by him.

== Awards and honors ==
In 1986, The Indian Physics Association awarded the N. S. Sathyamurthy Award for young scientists to Raychaudhuri. The Council of Scientific and Industrial Research awarded him the Shanti Swarup Bhatnagar Prize, one of the highest Indian science awards in 1994. He received the MRSI Medal of the Materials Research Society of India in 1996; the society would honour him again in 2002 with the MRSI-ICSC Super Conductivity and Materials Science Annual Prize. The Indian Science Congress selected him for the Millennium Medal in 2000 and three years later, he received the 2003 FICCI Award in materials science and applied sciences. The Indian National Science Academy honored him with the Homi Jehangir Bhabha Medal in 2008.

Raychaudhuri has held several research fellowships which include the Alexander von Humboldt fellowship (1980) as well as the J. C. Bose National fellowship of the Department of Science and Technology (2006) and was an Associate of the Indian Academy of Sciences (1986), Nuclear Science Centre (1996) and National Institute of Advanced Studies (1996). The Indian Academy of Sciences elected him as a fellow in 1993, the same year as he received the honorary senior fellowship of the Jawaharlal Nehru Centre for Advanced Scientific Research. The year 2000 brought him two elected fellowships, those of National Academy of Sciences, India and Asia-Pacific Academy of Materials which was followed by the elected fellowship of Indian National Science Academy a year later. He was also selected for the honorary professorship by the Jawaharlal Nehru Centre for Advanced Scientific Research in 2000. The award orations delivered by him include Platinum Jubilee Lecture of Indian Science Congress in 1999.

== Selected bibliography ==
- Das, Soma; Sriram, P. A.; Raychaudhuri, A. K. (2007). "Effects of nonlinear forces on dynamic mode atomic force microscopy and spectroscopy". Journal of Nanoscience and Nanotechnology. 7 (6): 2167–2171. doi:10.1166/jnn.2007.788. PMID 17655011.
- Ghosh, Manoranjan; Raychaudhuri, A. K. (2008). "Shape transition in ZnO nanostructures and its effect on blue-green photoluminescence". Nanotechnology. 19 (44) 445704. arXiv:0807.1439. Bibcode:2008Nanot..19R5704G. doi:10.1088/0957-4484/19/44/445704. PMID 21832746. S2CID 206053102.
- Venkata Kamalakar, M.; Rayachudhuri, A. K. (2009). "Critical phenomena in magnetic nanowires". Journal of Nanoscience and Nanotechnology. 9 (9): 5248–5253. doi:10.1166/jnn.2009.1150. PMID 19928208.
- Venkata Kamalakar, M.; Raychaudhuri, A. K. (2010). "Resistance anomaly near phase transition in confined ferromagnetic nanowires". Physical Review B. 82 (19) 195425. Bibcode:2010PhRvB..82s5425V. doi:10.1103/PhysRevB.82.195425.
- Ghosh, M.; Raychaudhuri, A. K. (2011). "Optical properties of Mg-substituted ZnO nanoparticles obtained by solution growth". IEEE Transactions on Nanotechnology. 10 (3): 555–559. Bibcode:2011ITNan..10..555G. doi:10.1109/TNANO.2010.2050899. S2CID 3230820.

== See also ==
- Scanning probe microscopy
