= Indian Centre for Space Physics =

Research institute in India

- Established: c. 1999; 27 years ago
- Research type: Autonomous Research institute
- Field of research: Astrobiology; Astrochemistry; High Energy Astrophysics; Ionospheric Sciences
- President: Subrata Midya (VP)
- Director: Sandip Chakrabarti
- Location: Kolkata, West Bengal, India
- Campus: Urban
- Operating agency: University of Calcutta
- Website: www.csp.res.in

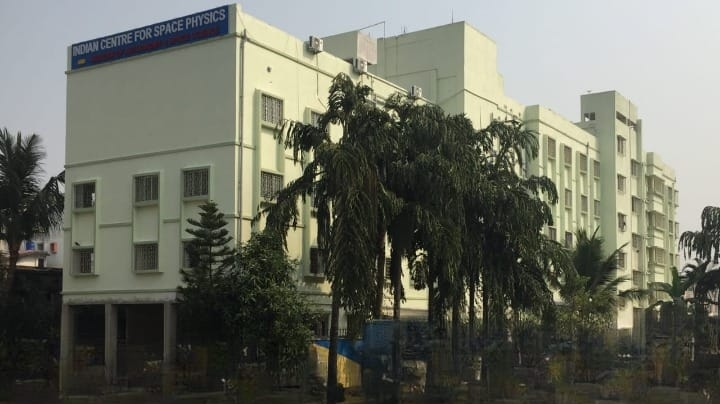

The Indian Centre for Space Physics (ICSP) is an Indian non-profit research organisation dedicated to carrying out advanced research in astronomy, astrophysics and space science. It is a sister institute of the University of Calcutta and the University of Gour Banga. It is located in the southern part of the city of Kolkata. It is located to its new Integrated campus on the Eastern metropolitan bypass 70 meters from Jyotirindra Nandy Metro station behind Metro Cash and Carry. Its Ionospheric and Earthquake Research Centre and optical observatory (IERCOO) where a 24-inch optical telescope (Vashista) has been installed is located at Sitapur, West Medinipur, where Astrotourism facility is opened. School and college students regularly carry out sky watching using its 10-inch telescope (Arundhati). The ground floor of the Integrated Campus has Museum of Astronomy and Space Museum.

== Branches ==
There are currently three branches at several places in West Bengal where people working in different fields of astrophysics: Malda (VLF activity), W. Midnapore (Optical telescopes) and Bolpur (balloon facility). A full-fledged near-space balloon facility is being constructed at Chandrapur, 14 km east of Suri, Birbhum.

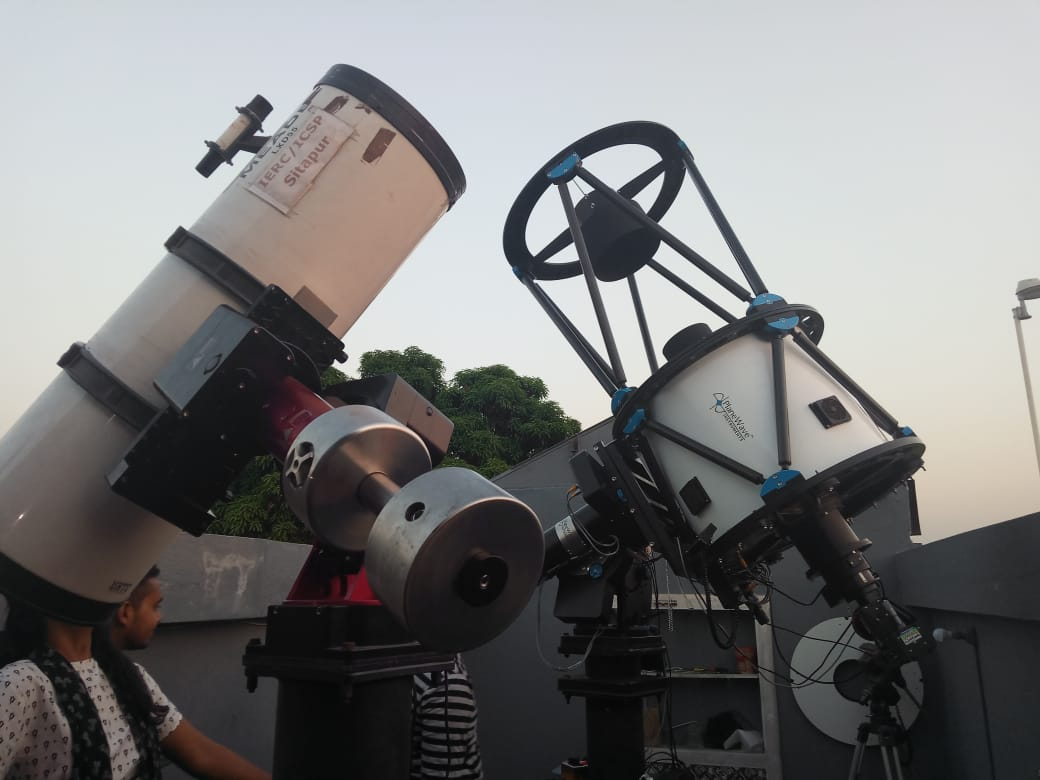
Image of two Telescopes (24 inch Telescope Vasishtha and 10 inch Mead telescope Arundhuti)

== Ionospheric and Earthquake Research Centre & Optical Observatory (IERCOO), Sitapur ==
The Ionospheric and Earthquake Research Centre & Optical Observatory (IERCOO) is a research facility of the Indian Centre for Space Physics, Kolkata, located in Sitapur, Paschim Medinipur district, West Bengal, India. (latitude 22.51, Longitude 87.78) The centre focuses on the study of the Earth’s ionosphere, earthquake-related processes, optical astronomy, and related atmospheric phenomena.

The centre carries out research in different scientific areas related to Optical Astronomy (GRB, Open Clusters, Supernovae, Exoplanets), VLF, and Ionospheric Sciences

=== Outreach Programmes at IERCOO branch ===
School and College students regularly visit and stay overnight for sky observation Summer camps on Telescope making are also conducted.

== ICSP Stratospheric Balloon Facility (ISBF) ==
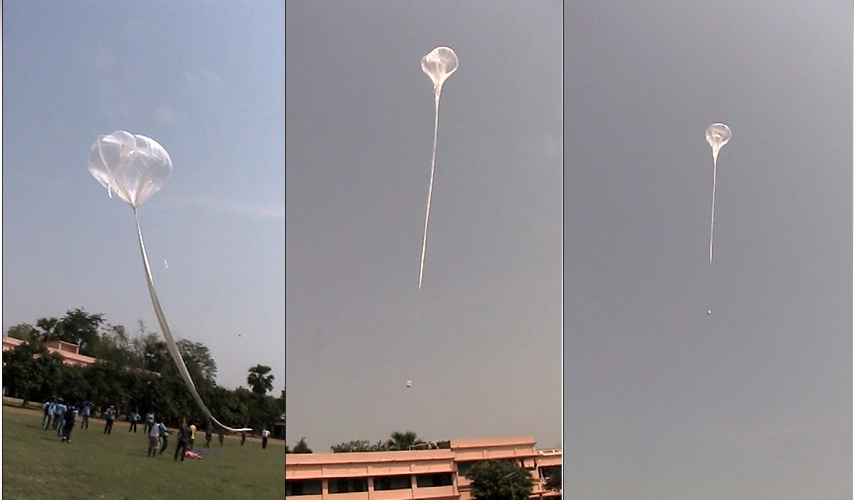
Balloon launch

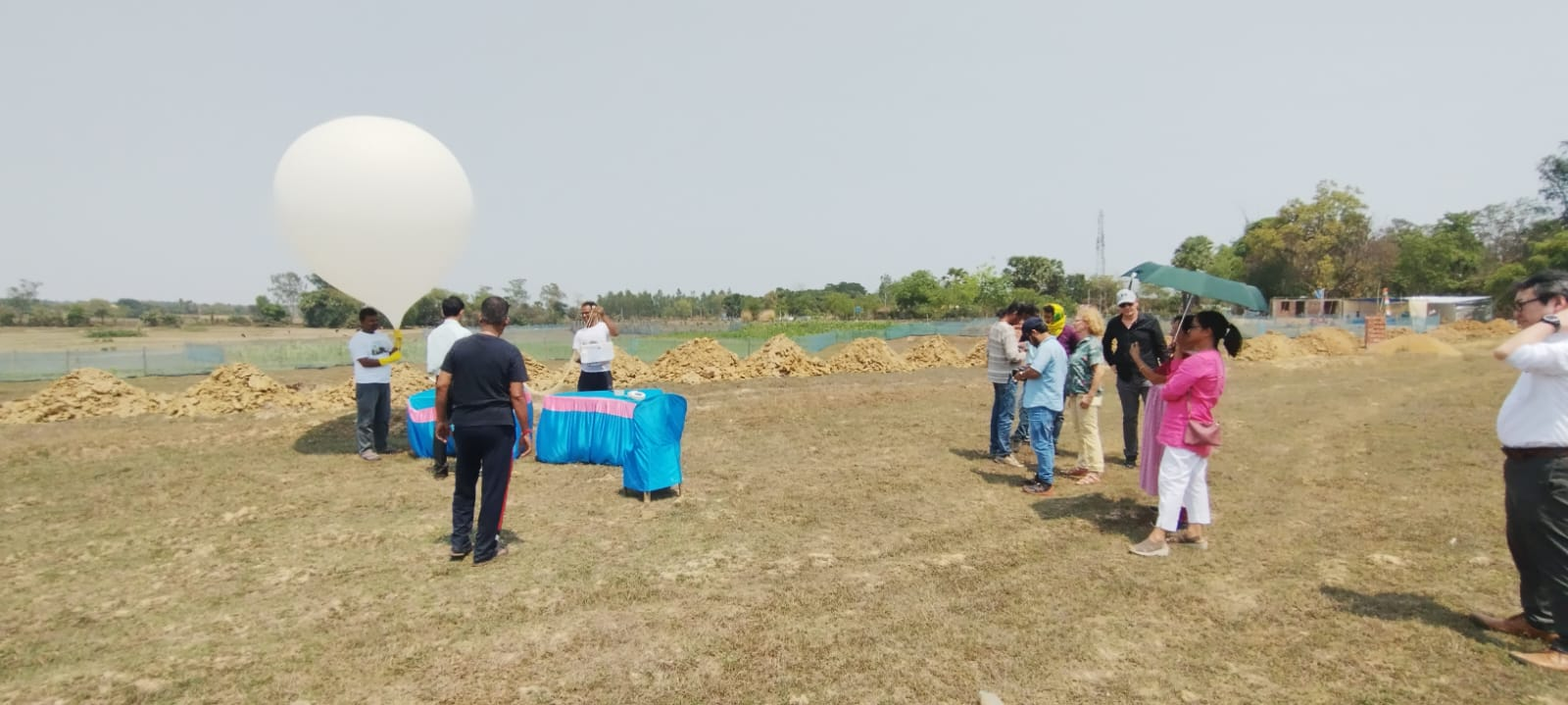
Maiden Balloon Launch from Startospheric Balloon Facility

The Startospheric Balloon Facility is located at Chandrapur, Birbhum (latitude 23.91, Longitude 87.39). 114 stratospheric balloons have been launched till date

== Faculties and divisions ==
ICSP has five major departments working on several branches of astrophysics and related subjects. Optical Astronomy is done at the Sitapur campus where two faculties, namely Dr. Ashish Raj and Dr. Devendra Bisht work. Prof. Sandip Chakrabarti, Dr. Sourav Palit, Dr. Tamal Basak, Dr. Prantik Nandi along with several PhD and pre-PhD students and Engineer Debashish Bhowmick work on the other divisions, namely, Astrobiology and Astrochemistry, High energy Astrophysics, Space Radiation, X-ray laboratories and ionospheric science. So far, ICSP has produced about 60 PhD students.

=== Division on Instrumentation for Space Exploration ===
Space exploration by means of balloon borne detectors is the main concern of this division. ICSP has pioneered in this field of low cost exploration of near earth space using light weight payloads on board weather balloons. ICSP payloads has visited the space more than 115 times and has gathered a multitude of data from extraterrestrial radiation sources, atmospheric radiation data due to cosmic ray interactions and other atmospheric data. These data has provided new understandings about the cosmic radiation sources as well as the radiation effects on the earth atmosphere. It has also been able to identify several X-ray sources.

=== Astrochemistry and astrobiology ===
ICSP pioneered is proposing that even the constituents of the DNA molecules may be produced due to star forming region (Chakrabarti & Chakrabarti, 2000). Since then major work was done to compute the reaction cross-sections to produce complex bio-molecules, grain chemistry, gas phase chemistry and fluid dynamics along with chemical evolution.

=== Ionospheric sciences ===
The main research activities of this department includes study on solar-terrestrial environment including solar disturbances, Earth's magnetosphere, ionosphere, thermosphere, lithosphere, atmosphere etc. Peoples also work on seismo-ionospheric precursors, lithosphere-atmosphere-ionosphere coupling processes, long-term and transient solar activity and ionospheric climatology using both ground and space based VLF receiver. Monitoring of galactic X-ray transients, Soft Gamma ray Repeaters (SGRs) and Gamma Ray Bursts (GRBs) etc. are also active research topic in this department.

=== High energy astrophysics ===
This department mainly deals with Black Hole astrophysics. There are two branches of black hole astrophysics: Theoretical and Observational. In Theoretical work we carry out the computation of the spectra from matter falling on a black hole. In observational science, we use balloon facility to observe X-ray sources.

== Activities and collaborations ==
ICSP is collaborating with several national and international institutions and universities. It has produced two PhD students of Nepalese origin in collaboration with ICTP (The Abdus Salam International Centre for Theoretical Physics), Italy. Scientist from ICSP has been taking part in the Antarctica expeditions. In the balloon borne science mission, we have sent low cost payloads through balloons 115 times and obtained valuable data. In addition we are in collaboration with several universities.

== Museum of Astronomy and Space Science ==
On 27 October 2023, the first Indian astronaut Rakesh Sharma inaugurated a 7000 sqft Museum of Astronomy and Space Science inside the Integrated campus of Indian Centre for Space Physics with a wide collection of artefacts from Apollo program and its astronauts, Lunar soil to Martian meteorites, Autographs for most of the astronauts, Nobel laureates and inventors, diaries and handwritten notes of hundreds of scientists working in the area. It was made public on 3 December 2023

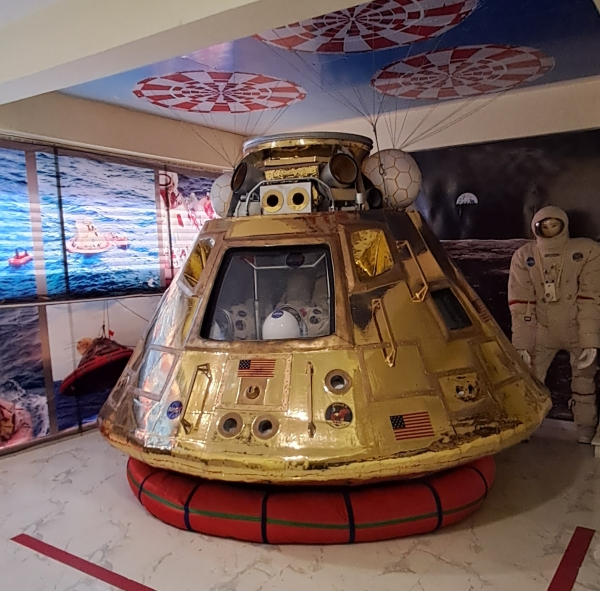
Apollo 11 Module (80% size) in the Apollo room

In 2025, Astronaut Shubhanshu Shukla, Ashoka Chakra, visited the ICSP when Shubhanshu Shukla Pavilion was inaugurated
