= Atanu Nath =

Indian physicist

- Born: Lalabazar, Hailakandi district, Assam, India
- Education: Gurucharan College (BSc); S. N. Bose National Centre for Basic Sciences (MSc); Tata Institute of Fundamental Research; University of Naples Federico II (PhD)
- Employer(s): Tihu College; Indian Institute of Technology Guwahati (formerly)
- Known for: Muon g−2 experiment Quantum chromodynamics
- Awards: Breakthrough Prize in Fundamental Physics (2026)

Atanu Nath is an Indian physicist who is an Assistant Professor in the Department of Physics at Tihu College in the Nalbari district of Assam. He is known for his contributions to the Muon g−2 experiments, for which he was named a co-recipient of the 2026 Breakthrough Prize in Fundamental Physics. Nath is the first scientist from Northeast India to receive this honour, which is widely referred to as the "Oscars of Science". He earned his Ph.D. from the University of Naples Federico II and worked as a postdoctoral fellow at the Indian Institute of Technology Guwahati.

== Early life and education ==
Atanu Nath was born into a Bengali family and raised in Lalabazar, a town located in the Hailakandi district of Assam. He is the son of Birendra Kumar Nath and Binata Rani Nath, both of whom are retired schoolteachers.

Nath completed his graduation with honours in Physics at Gurucharan College in Silchar in 2008. He subsequently pursued higher studies at the S. N. Bose National Centre for Basic Sciences in Kolkata, earning his master's degree in 2011, and the Tata Institute of Fundamental Research (TIFR) in Mumbai. He went on to earn his Ph.D. in Theoretical Particle Physics from the University of Naples Federico II in Italy in 2016, specialising in quantum chromodynamics and rare kaon decays under the supervision of Dr. Giancarlo D'Ambrosio.

== Career and research ==
Nath worked as a postdoctoral fellow funded by the National Institute of Nuclear Physics (INFN) in Naples, Italy, from 2017 to 2020. During this tenure, he made crucial contributions to the Fermilab Muon g−2 experiment (E989). He served as a run coordinator for the experiment and was instrumental in developing the data acquisition, reconstruction, and analysis framework for the experiment's laser calibration system. This calibration was essential for maintaining the extreme precision necessary to measure the anomalous magnetic moment of the muon.

In 2020, Nath returned to India to work as a postdoctoral Research Associate at the Indian Institute of Technology (IIT) Guwahati. He focused heavily on neutrino research, contributing to major international experiments such as the Deep Underground Neutrino Experiment (DUNE) and the NOvA experiment. For DUNE, he worked on designing and optimising the muon identification system for the near detector.

In 2022, Nath joined Tihu College in Assam as an Assistant Professor of Physics, where he continues his teaching and academic research.

== Awards and honours ==
In April 2026, Nath was awarded the Breakthrough Prize in Fundamental Physics. The $3 million prize was shared among a global collaboration of 376 scientists, including roughly 11 Indian researchers, for their work on the Muon g−2 experiment. Nath was noted as the only awardee among the Indian recipients currently living and working in India at the time of the announcement. The official award ceremony took place on 18 April 2026, in Santa Monica, California. His achievement was celebrated across Assam, with felicitation ceremonies held at his college and commendations from state officials, including Assam's Education Minister Ranoj Pegu.

== Selected publications ==
- Abi, B. et al. (Muon g−2 Collaboration) (2021). "Measurement of the Positive Muon Anomalous Magnetic Moment to 0.46 ppm". Physical Review Letters. 126 (14): 141801.
- Abi, B. et al. (Muon g−2 Collaboration) (2021). "Measurement of the anomalous precession frequency of the muon in the Fermilab Muon g−2 Experiment". Physical Review D. 103 (7): 072002.
- Anastasi, A. et al. (2019). "The laser-based gain monitoring system of the calorimeters in the Muon g−2 experiment at Fermilab". Journal of Instrumentation. 14 (11): P11025.
- Driutti, A. et al. (2018). "The calibration system of the Muon g−2 experiment". Nuclear Instruments and Methods in Physics Research Section A. 936: 10.1016/j.nima.2018.10.045.
