= Sandip Chakrabarti =

Indian astrophysicist

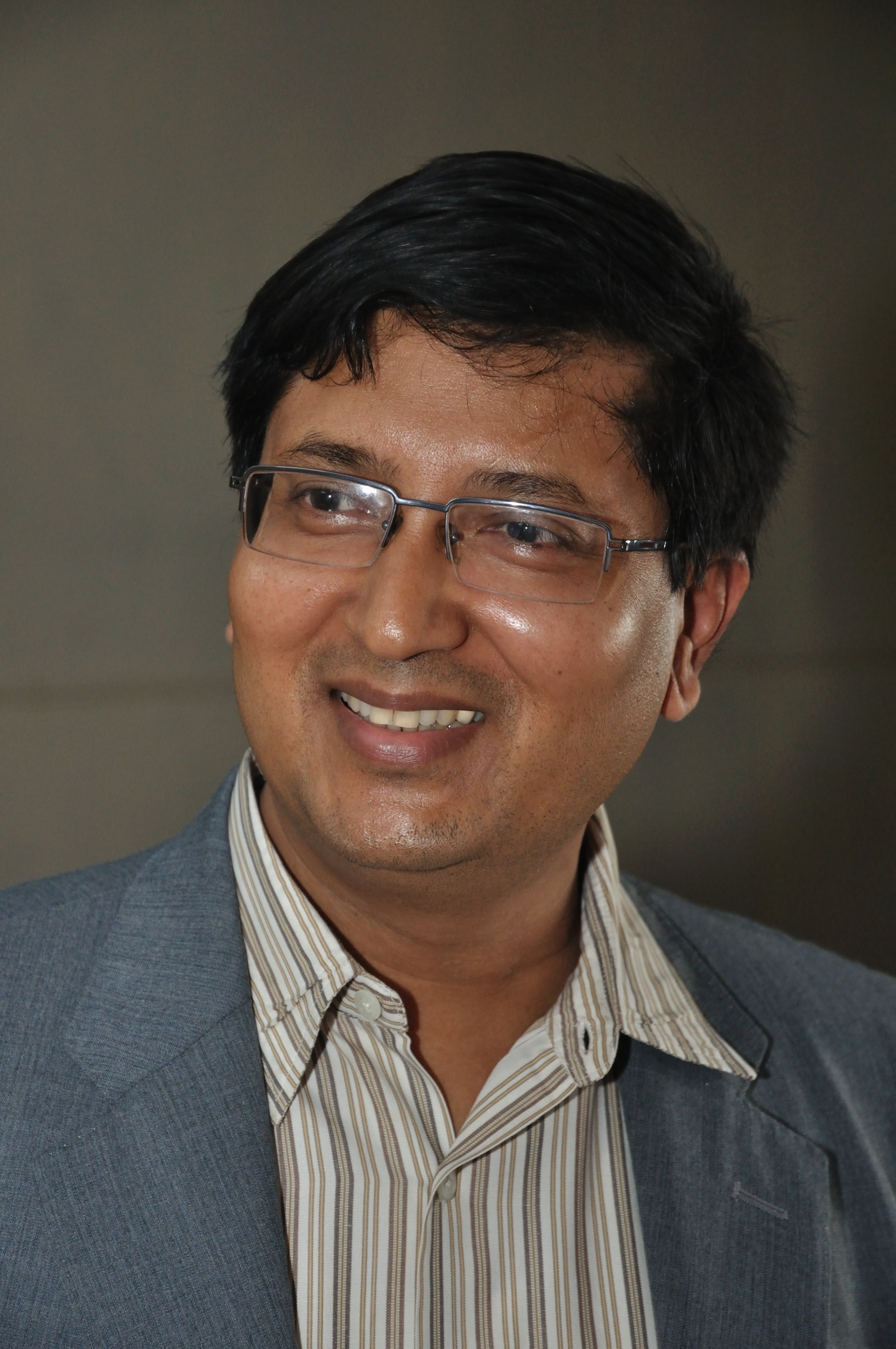
- Sandip Chakrabarti
- Born: 15 November 1958 (age 67); Malda, West Bengal, India
- Citizenship: Indian
- Education: University of Chicago (Ph.D); IIT Kanpur (M.Sc); Ramakrishna Mission Residential College, Narendrapur (B.Sc)
- Known for: Research in Black Hole Astrophysics, low cost balloon borne science, Astrochemistry leading to biomolecules, ionospheric science and earthquake predictions.
- Awards: Received DSc from University of Gour Banga, Received Banga Ratna from Government of West Bengal.
- Scientific career
- Fields: Astrophysics
- Workplaces: Director and Distinguished Professor at Indian Centre for Space Physics, Kolkata
- Doctoral advisor: W. David Arnett, University of Chicago

Sandip Chakrabarti

Director at Indian Centre for Space Physics
- In office 2018–Ongoing

Senior professor at S. N. Bose National Centre for Basic Sciences
- In office 1996–2018

Faculty at Tata Institute of Fundamental Research
- In office 1989–1996

Sandip Chakrabarti is an Indian astrophysicist. He developed a computer model to show how life on earth could have originated in outer space.

== Education ==
He started his education in Ramakrishna Mission Vivekananda Vidyamandir in Malda. After finishing his Bachelor of Science from Ramakrishna Mission Residential College, Narendrapur in Physics Honours in 1979 (and becoming topper of Calcutta University) he went to IIT, Kanpur to complete his M.Sc. Degree in Physics in 1981. He joined the Physics Dept. of the University of Chicago in 1981 to complete PhD work. Soon he completed a paper with Robert Geroch and X.B. Liang on a Theorem on "Time like Curves of limited acceleration in General Relativity", and under S. Chandrasekhar's supervision solved the Dirac equation for massive particles with spin in Kerr geometry. Subsequently, he concentrated on black hole astrophysics, received his Ph.D. in 1985 and went to Caltech as a R.C. Tolman Fellow. Major work in this period includes finding Natural Angular Momentum distribution of barotropic flow around black holes, nucleosynthesis around black holes.

== Career ==
After a brief period at ICTP, Trieste, where Chakrabarti completed a few definitive work on the formation of shocks in transonic/advective flows around black holes, he joined Tata Institute of Fundamental Research, and S.N. Bose National Centre. Currently, he is the Director of Indian Centre for Space Physics, Kolkata, which he founded in 1999. He was at NASA Goddard Space Flight Centre (1994-1995) as a Senior Associate selected by National Research Council.

== Research ==
The main focus of Chakrabarti's research is the hydrodynamic and radiative properties of astrophysical flows around black holes and other compact objects. He showed that the accreting matter must be transonic and should have standing, oscillating and propagating shocks. He and his collaborators studied many aspects of these flows and showed that the black hole accretion must have non-Keplerian component which plays a major role in deciding the observational properties. He wrote the first monograph on "Theory of Transonic Astrophysical Flows" (World Scientific Pub. Co., Singapore; 1990). He has completed over 650 research articles and written or edited several books and conference volumes. Fifty Nine students have completed Ph.D. Thesis under his supervision.

Chakrabarti was the first scientist to suggest that Gamma-ray bursts are the birth cry of black holes at his presentation in 1995, third Huntsville, Alabama Conference. In 2013, Scientists observed a conclusive evidence of this birth cry. He is also the first to suggest (1992-1996) that the accretion disks in an extreme mass ratio binaries could change the gravitational wave signals.
