= Tanushree Debbarma =

Indian Administrative Service officer

Tanusree Debbarma

Unique Identification Authority of India (UIDAI)

Deputy Director General
- In office Dec 2021 – Present

Science, Technology and Environment Department Government of Tripura

Secretary
- In office Jul 2021 – Dec 2021

Revenue Department Government of Tripura

Secretary
- In office Mar 2020 – Dec 2020

Finance Department Government of Tripura

Secretary
- In office Jan 2020 – Oct 2020

Tribal Welfare and Elementary Education Government of Tripura

Director
- In office Jun 2019 – Dec 2019

KUIDFC (Karnataka Urban Infrastructure Development and Finance Corp. Ltd)

Joint Managing Director
- In office Dec 2016 – Sep 2018

Information Technology and Biotechnology Government of Karnataka

Director
- In office Jun 2014 – Dec 2016

District Administration, Khowai, Government of Tripura

District Magistrate and Collector
- In office Dec 2011 – May 2014

Personal details
- Education: IIT Delhi
- Religion: Hinduism

Tanusree Debbarma is the first woman Indian Administrative Service (IAS) officer in Tripura, India. She was the first woman from Tripura to pass the UPSC exam. She secured fourth place in the civil service examination in the ST category in 2006. She studied at the Indian Institute of Technology Delhi and received an offer from a multi-national IT firm but turned it down to prepare for the Civil Services Examination IAS exam.

Debbarma was in the Government of Karnataka until 2020 as the Director of Tribal Welfare with additional roles of Director of Elementary Education and State Project Director, National Education Mission (Samagra Shiksha Abhiyan). She has now been transferred and appointed secretary to the Government of Tripura.

She now holds the additional posts of Secretary of Industries and Commerce (Information and Technology) and member of Tripura Sales Tax Tribunal and VAT Tribunal in the state administration of Tripura. During the COVID-19 pandemic lockdown, she was one of the officials from the Government of Tripura engaged in bringing back people stranded in other states.
