= Sushanta Kumar Dattagupta =

Indian physicist

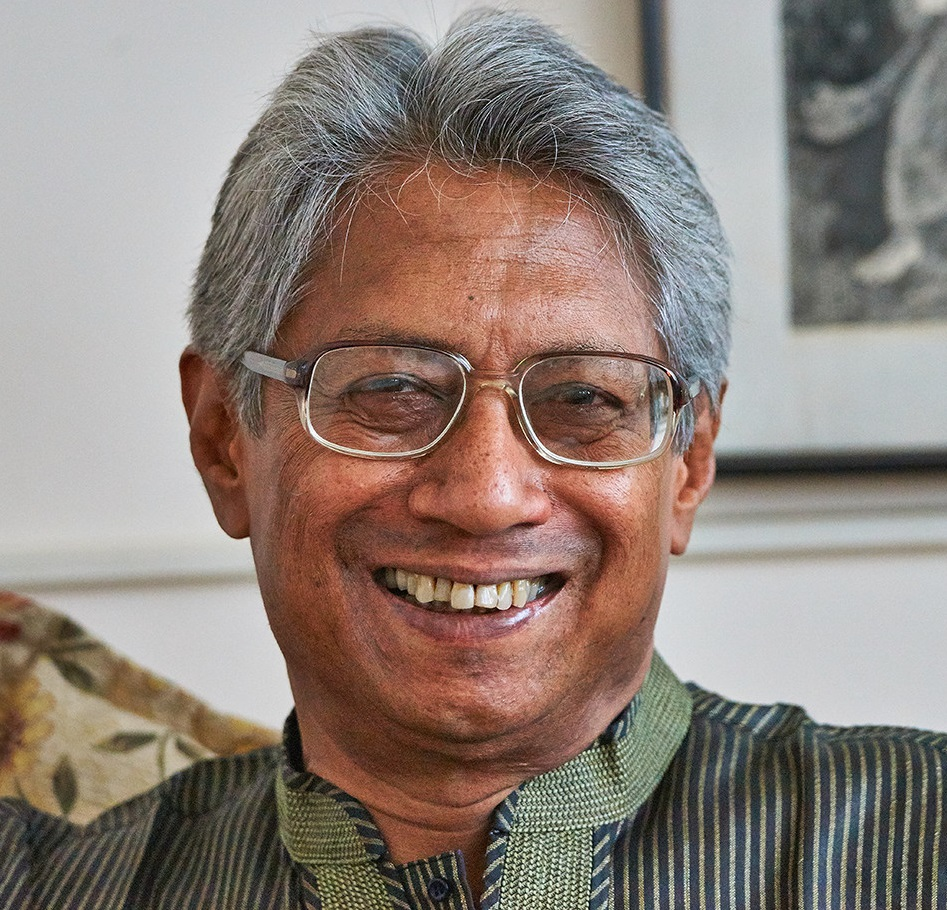
- Born: 19 December 1947 (age 78); Kolkata, West Bengal, India
- Education: Calcutta University (BSc, MSc); St. John's University (PhD)
- Occupation: Physicist

Sushanta Kumar Dattagupta

Vice-chancellor at Visva-Bharati University
- In office 2011–2016

Director at IISER Kolkata
- In office 2006–2011

Director at S. N. Bose National Centre for Basic Sciences
- In office 1999–2005

Sushanta Kumar Dattagupta, known better as Sushanta Dattagupta, is an Indian condensed matter physicist. He was Director of the S N Bose National Centre for Basic Sciences Kolkata between 1999 and 2005 and then he was appointed Program Co-ordinator by the Ministry of Human Resources and Development (MHRD) for the newly evolving system of Indian Institutes of Science Education and Research (IISER). Subsequently, in 2006 he was made the founding director of IISER Kolkata. After serving one full term there the same ministry of HRD made him the Vice-chancellor of Visva-Bharati, which is served between September 2011 and February 2016.

== Biography ==
Sushanta Dattagupta, was born in Kolkata, West Bengal, India on 19 December 1947 and graduated in Physics (BSc Hons), in 1965, from the University of Calcutta. His master's degree also came from the same university in 1967. The next year, in 1968, Dr. Dattagupta joined the Presidency College, Kolkata as a lecturer in Physics where he taught for one year. In 1969, Dattagupta went to the US to join the Brookhaven National Laboratory and St. John's University where he did his doctoral research to obtain a PhD in Physics, in 1973. He continued in North America for three more years to work as a post-doctoral fellow at the Carnegie-Mellon University, Pittsburgh, USA till 1975, and later, at the University of Alberta, Canada for a year.

Dattagupta returned to India in 1976 to join the Materials Science Laboratory, Indira Gandhi Centre for Atomic Research, Kalpakkam, Tamil Nadu where he worked as a scientific officer till 1981. The next assignment was as the Reader at the School of Physics, University of Hyderabad which lasted till 1986. In 1986, Dattagupta was offered a job at the Jawaharlal Nehru University where he taught till 1999, first as a Professor and later as the Dean of the School of Physical Sciences.

He returned to his native place, Kolkata, in 1999, assuming responsibility as the director of the S.N. Bose National Centre for Basic Sciences and worked there till 2006. This was followed by the Directorship of the Indian Institute of Science Education and Research, Kolkata (IISER).

== Career ==
When the Indian Institute of Science Education and Research, Kolkata (IISER) was established at Mohanpur, West Bengal, in July 2006, under the aegis of the Ministry of Human Resource Development, Government of India, Dattagupta was its first director.

He has published his research findings as several books and published nearly 200 articles.

Dattagupta has also attended several national and international seminars to deliver keynote addresses.

== Positions ==
Dattagupta has held many positions, both on academic and organizational levels. He was the Foreign Secretary and Vice President of the Indian National Science Academy between 1998 and 2001, Vice President of the Indian Academy of Sciences, Bangalore during 2004-2009 and a council member of the National Academy of Sciences, India, Allahabad from 2001 to 2014. He was elected Fellow of The World Academy of Sciences (TWAS), Trieste, Italy in 1999. He has held the chair of the national committees of the Indian National Science Academy for International Council of Science (ICSU) and Council for Scientific and Industrial Research and was the vice chairman of STATPHYS 22, an International Conference on Statistical Physics held in Bangalore in July 2004. he served as the Convener of the sectional committee on Physical Sciences of the Indian Academy of Sciences, Bangalore during 1999-2003. He was also a member of CSIR Emeritus Scientists Committee during 2002-04, research council of the National Physical Laboratory during 2001-06 and the membership committee of the Third World Academy of Sciences (TWAS) during 2004-06.

== See also ==
- Visva-Bharati University
- Indian Institutes of Science Education and Research
- S.N. Bose National Centre for Basic Sciences
- Condensed matter physics
- Dissipative systems
- Quantum optics
