= Tanusri Saha-Dasgupta =

Indian scientist

Tanusri Saha-Dasgupta is an Indian physicist. She is a Senior Professor and Director at S.N. Bose National Centre for Basic Sciences.

== Life ==
She graduated from the renowned Rajabazar Science College, University of Calcutta. She is a Swarnajayanti Fellow. She is an elected fellow of The World Academy of Science (2019), American Physical Society (2015), Indian National Academy of Sciences (2021), Indian Academy of Sciences, Bangalore (2010), National Academy of Sciences, India(2010), West Bengal Academy of Science & Technology,(2013). She is recipient of J. C. Bose National Fellowship (2020), APJ Kalam HPC award (2018), "MRSI-ICSC Superconductivity & Materials Science Annual Prize" for the year 2016, Dr. P. Sheel Memorial Lecture Award, National Academy of Sciences, 2012, and appointed Head of MPG-India partnergroup program, 2005.

== Works ==
- Poteryaev, Alexander; Tomczak, Jan; Biermann, Silke; Georges, Antoine; Lichtenstein, Alexander; Rubtsov, Alexey; Saha-Dasgupta, Tanusri; Andersen, Ole (2007). "Enhanced crystal-field splitting and orbital-selective coherence induced by strong correlations in V2O3". Physical Review B. 76 (8) 085127. arXiv:cond-mat/0701263. Bibcode:2007PhRvB..76h5127P. doi:10.1103/PhysRevB.76.085127. ISSN 1098-0121. S2CID 119373890.
- Viswanatha, Ranjani; Sapra, Sameer; Saha-Dasgupta, Tanusri; Sarma, D. (2005). "Electronic structure of and quantum size effect in III-V and II-VI semiconducting nanocrystals using a realistic tight binding approach". Physical Review B. 72 (4) 045333. arXiv:cond-mat/0505451. Bibcode:2005PhRvB..72d5333V. doi:10.1103/PhysRevB.72.045333. ISSN 1098-0121. S2CID 44748275.
