= Indian Institute of Science Education and Research, Kolkata =

Research Institute in West Bengal, India

Indian Institute of Science Education and Research Kolkata
- Motto: Towards Excellence in Science
- Type: Public university
- Established: c. 2006; 20 years ago
- Affiliations: Institutes of National Importance
- Budget: ₹204 crore (US$22 million) (FY2025–26 est.)
- Chairman: Arvind A. Natu
- Director: Sunil Kumar Khare
- Academic staff: 128 (2025)
- Students: 1,791 (2025)
- Undergraduates: 1,050 (2025)
- Postgraduates: 139 (2025)
- Doctoral students: 602 (2025)
- Location: Mohanpur, West Bengal, India; 22°57′49.83″N 88°30′55.76″E
- Campus: Urban 250 acres (100 ha)
- Colours: Blue, white
- Website: www.iiserkol.ac.in

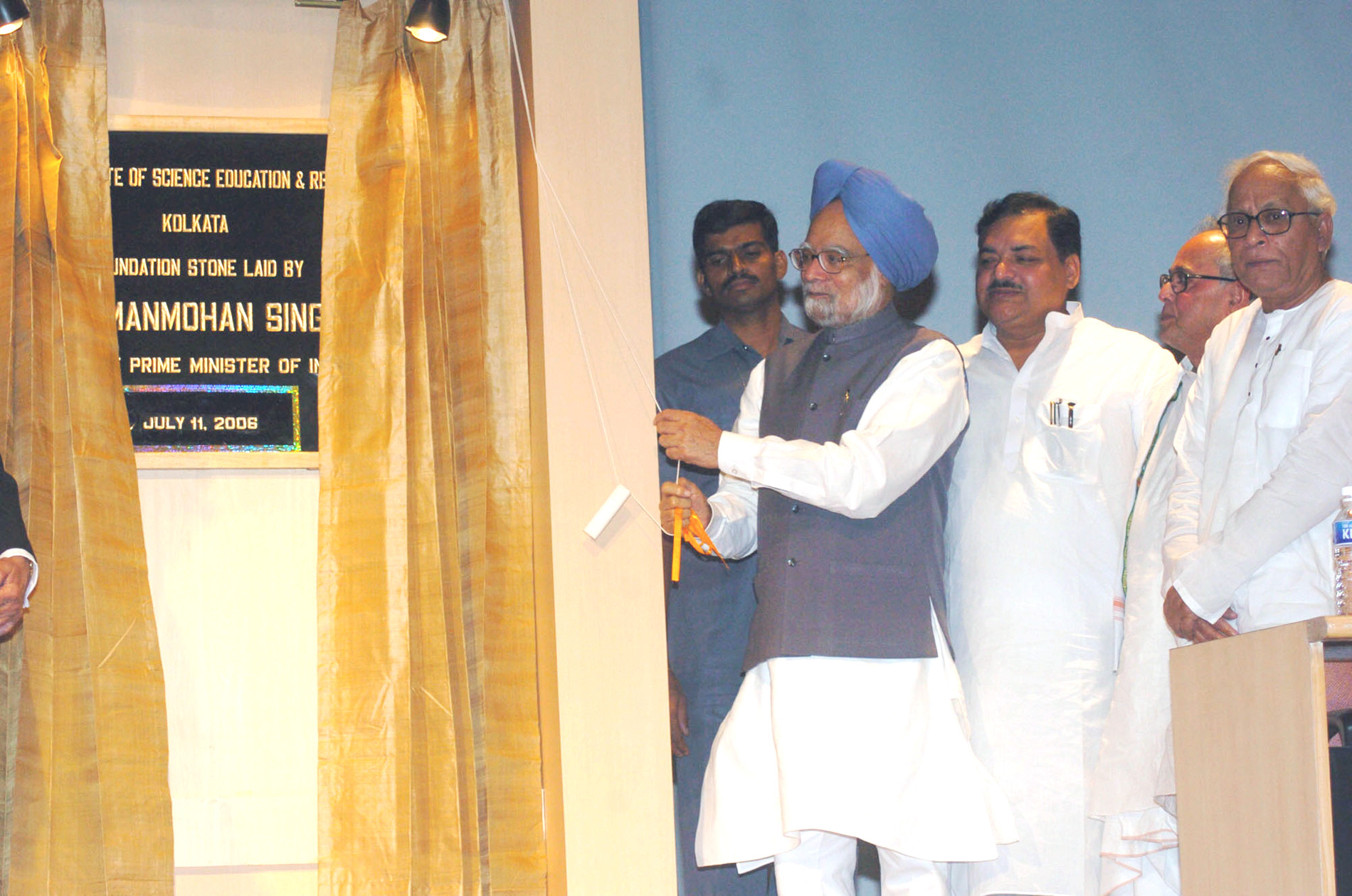
Former Prime Minister, Dr. Manmohan Singh laying the foundation stone for Kolkata Campus of the Institute

Directors
- Sushanta Kumar Dattagupta, 2006–2012; Rabindranath Mukherjee, 2012–2017; Sourav Pal, 2017–2022; Prasanta K. Panigrahi (acting), 2022–2023; Soumitro Banerjee (acting), 2023–2024; Sunil Kumar Khare, 2024–present

Indian Institute of Science Education and Research Kolkata (known as IISERK or IISER Kolkata) is a public autonomous research institute in science and education field located in Mohanpur near the town of Kalyani in Nadia, West Bengal, India. It was established by the Ministry of Education, Government of India on 11 July 2006 and promoted to the status of an Institute of National Importance in 2012 vide the NIT Amendment Act. It is one of seven Indian Institutes of Science Education and Research, and was one of the first IISERs to be established along with IISER Pune. It is considered to be one of the leading institutes of India in terms of research output. In 2022, it was ranked fourth among the academic institutions in India by the Nature Index in 2022. The current director of IISER Kolkata is Prof Sunil Kumar Khare.

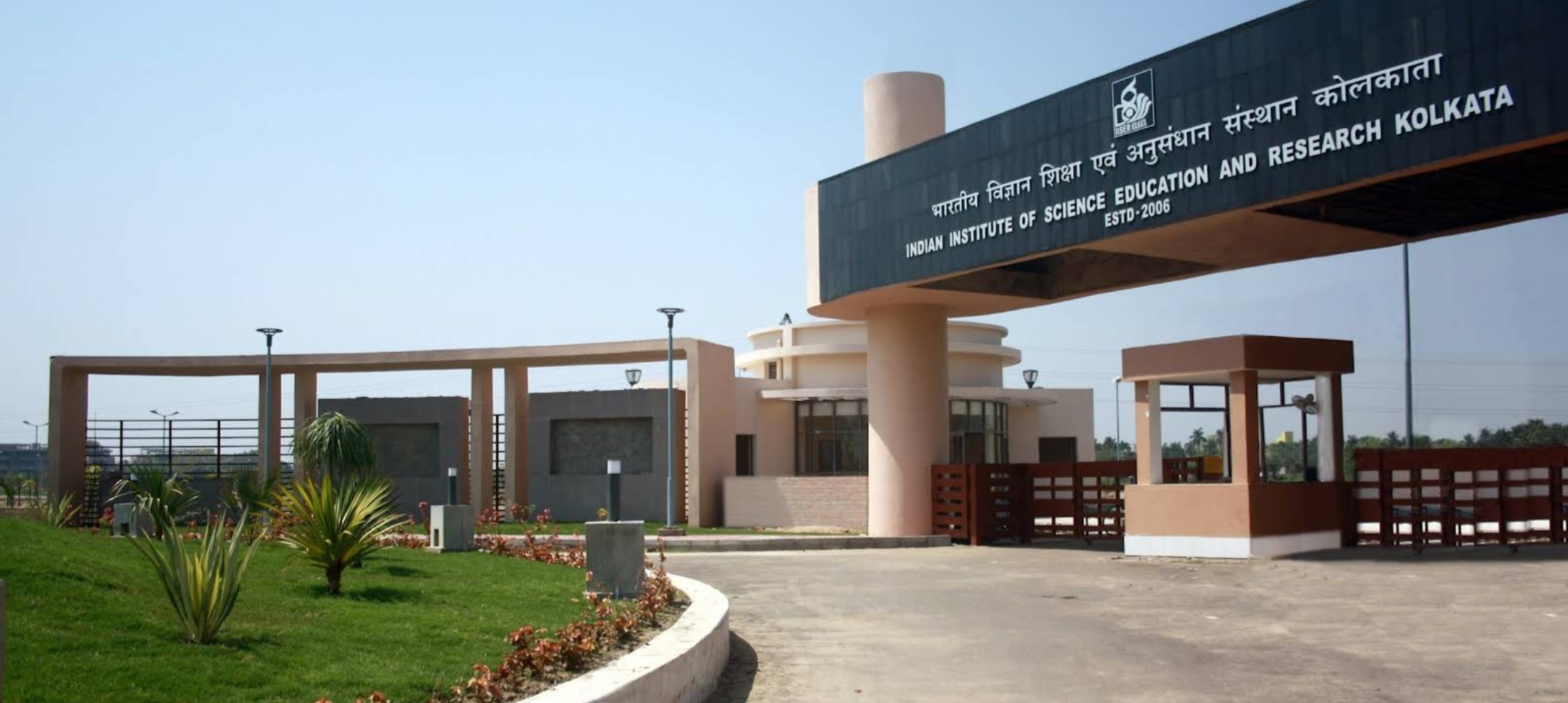
Entrance of IISER, Kolkata

== History ==
The Indian Institutes of Science Education and Research (IISERs), including the Kolkata campus, originated from a 2005 recommendation by the Prime Minister's Science Advisory Council, chaired by Prof. C. N. R. Rao. The council proposed establishing these institutions to cultivate excellence in basic sciences at both undergraduate and postgraduate levels, integrating research and education. The initial plan included IISERs in Kolkata and other locations, with each receiving an estimated ₹500 crore over five years for development, encompassing building construction and faculty recruitment.

=== Planning and Formation ===
Following the 2005 recommendation, a committee—including Dr. S. Sivaram, Prof. P. Balaram, Mr. Sudip Banerjee, Prof. Sanjay Dhande, and Prof. Sushanta Dattagupta—was formed on March 18, 2005, to develop a charter and define objectives and implementation strategies for the IISERs. A separate local committee for IISER Kolkata convened on September 14, 2005, and a feasibility report was submitted to the Planning Commission on July 20, 2005. The IISERs, including IISER Kolkata, were formally established by the Science Education and Research (Amendment) Act, 2010, and granted Institutes of National Importance status in 2012. IISER Kolkata initially operated from temporary campuses at IIT Kharagpur's Salt Lake campus and then a second temporary location before establishing its permanent campus.

== Campus ==
The Indian Institute of Science Education and Research (IISER) Kolkata is located on a 201-acre campus in Mohanpur, West Bengal, approximately 50 kilometers north of Kolkata. The campus features modern facilities designed to support its integrated approach to science education and research. Student housing is provided in three hostels: Netaji Subhas Chandra Bose Hall, Ishwar Chandra Vidyasagar Hall, and Nivedita Hall. The campus also includes advanced research laboratories. In 2022, IISER Kolkata was ranked fourth among Indian academic institutions by the Nature Index.

== Organisation and administration ==
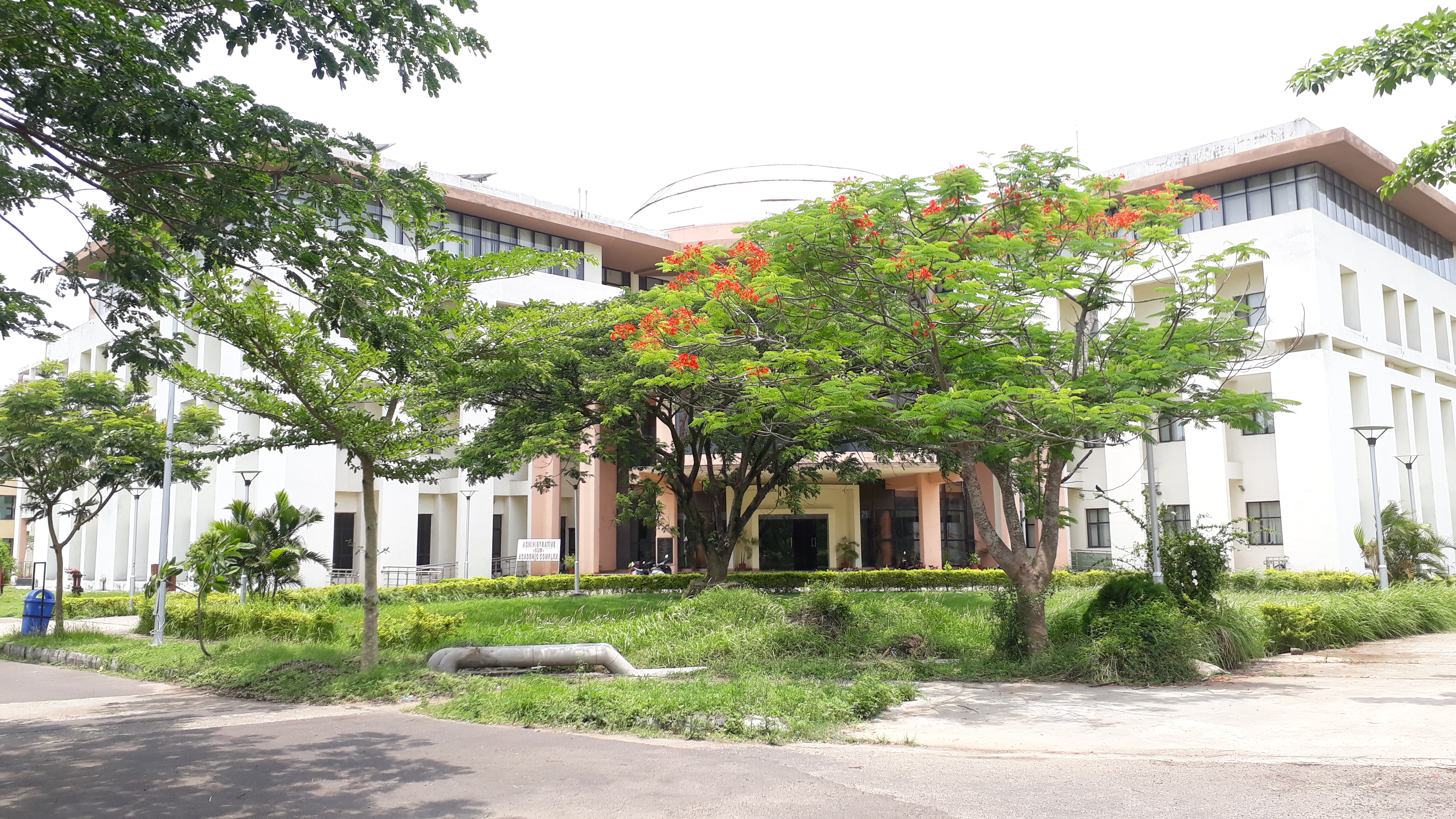
Administrative Building of IISER, Kolkata in Kalyani campus

The institute hosts the multi-institutional Center of Excellence in Space Sciences India (CESSI) with participating scientists from ISRO and other astronomy institutes and is involved in research associated with national space science missions. Other centres include the Centre for Advanced Functional Materials, National Centre for High Pressure Studies and a Centre for Climate and Environment Studies. It also has a field station for ecological, environmental and field studies, a greenhouse, a broadband seismological observatory. The institute jointly runs the Göttingen-Kolkata: Open shell systems (G-KOSS) in fundamentals of molecular spintronics with University of Göttingen.

=== Recent Developments ===
The Dirac Supercomputer, inaugurated in April 2019, is a high-performance computing (HPC) facility located at the institute. Named after the renowned physicist Paul Dirac, this supercomputer was officially launched on April 17, 2019, marking a significant advancement in computational research capabilities in India. It was established to support the advanced computational needs of researchers across various disciplines. It delivers a total performance of 78.8 Teraflops, comprising 60 teraflops from its central processing unit (CPU) and an additional 18.8 teraflops from its graphics processing units (GPUs).

The institute is actively planning to advance disease management through interdisciplinary research and collaborations. In light of the challenges posed by the COVID-19 pandemic, the institute is prioritizing research that addresses both immediate and long-term health concerns. This includes studying infectious diseases and developing effective management strategies. The institute is also looking to involve the community in its research efforts, ensuring that the findings can be translated into practical applications that benefit public health.

On July 11, 2025, a new BS-MS program in Computational and Data Sciences was launched by former aerospace scientist G. Satheesh Reddy for the recently established Department of Computational and Data Sciences (CDS) at the institute.

== Academics ==
The Indian Institute of Science Education and Research Kolkata (IISER Kolkata) is a public autonomous research institute in Mohanpur, West Bengal. Established in 2006 by the Ministry of Education (formerly the Ministry of Human Resource Development), the institute offers undergraduate, postgraduate, and doctoral programs in the natural sciences, integrating classroom education with fundamental research.

=== Academic programmes ===
IISER Kolkata offers two undergraduate programs, both designed to provide students with a rigorous scientific education and research experience, preparing them for advanced studies and careers in academia, research, and industry. It offers a 5-year BS-MS in biological sciences, chemical sciences, geological sciences, mathematical sciences and Physical Sciences, plus a new Computational & Data Sciences program. Postgraduate options include M.Sc. in 3 programmes including Mathematics and Sustainable Science and MS by Research in Biological Sciences, Space Physics, while doctoral programs cover Integrated PhD in 3 programmes, PhD in 8 programmes including Humanities and Social Sciences and Space Sciences and Post Doctoral Research Programme in various sciences. Admission is through the IISER Aptitude Test (IAT), with additional historical channels like KVPY and JEE Advanced, though IAT is the primary mode for 2025. Both programmes align with the National Education Policy (NEP) 2020, offering multiple exit options, such as a BS degree after four years, though the full 5-year progrme is recommended for comprehensive research experience.

=== Departments ===
The institute has seven academic departments

Departments of IISER, Kolkata
- Biological Sciences
- Chemical Sciences
- Computational and Data Sciences
- Earth Sciences
- Humanities and Social Sciences
- Mathematics and Statistics
- Physical Sciences

=== Research centers ===
- Centre for Advanced Functional Materials (CAFM)
- Centre for Climate and Environmental Studies (CCES)
- Center of Excellence in Space Sciences India (CESSI)
- National Centre for High Pressure Studies (NCHPS)
- Center for Artificial Intelligence (CFAI)

=== Advanced Laboratories ===
Institute equipped with cutting-edge instruments like CHN Analyser, Field Emission Scanning Electron Microscope (FESEM), and Matrix-Assisted Laser Desorption Ionisation (MALDI), essential for hands-on learning and research.

=== Rankings and Reputation ===
It was ranked fourth among the academic institutions in India by the Nature Index in the 2022 tables, and thirteenth in the 2023 tables. Internationally, the institute was ranked 251–300 among institutes in emerging economies, by the Times Higher Education's "Emerging Economies University Rankings 2022". In India, the National Institutional Ranking Framework (NIRF) ranked the institute 61 overall in 2024 and 38 among research institutes.

University rankings

General – international
- Times (Emerging) (2022): 251–300

General – India
- NIRF (Overall) (2024): 61
- NIRF (Research) (2024): 38

== Events ==
The college organizes a major annual festival, Inquivesta, which is promoted as one of the first and the biggest science festivals of the country.

Inquivesta sees a footfall of 6000+, and has been visited by artists such as Mohammed Irfan (Singer), Frozt (DJ), Waves in Town (Band), Zakir Khan (comedian), Sapan Verma, Nalayak (band) and Anubhav Singh Bassi. It has also received brands such as Baskin-Robbins and Domino's Pizza as its previous partners IISER Kolkata has also been hosting VIJYOSHI (the national science camp), along with IISc Bangalore and the Department of Science and Technology, Govt. of India, since 2014.

The institute also has an E-Cell for promoting an entrepreneurial culture in the student body.

== See also ==
- IISER Aptitude Test
- List of universities in India
- List of autonomous higher education institutes in India
- List of Institutes of National Importance
