= Rahul Banerjee =

Rahul Banerjee may refer to:

- Rahul Banerjee (actor) (1983–2026), Indian actor
- Rahul Banerjee (archer) (born 1986), Indian archer
- Rahul Banerjee (chemist) (born 1978), Indian chemist
