= Susmita =

- Gender: Female
- Language: Tamil; Hindi; Sanskrit; Bengali; Telugu

Origin
- Meaning: "lovely smile", "radiant smile"
- Region of origin: Nepal and Bengal

Other names
- Alternative spelling: Shushmitha, Sushmita, Sushmitha

Susmita (also spelled as Sushmita and Sushmitha and Sushmithak) is a Hindu/Sanskrit Indian feminine given name. Notable people with the name include:

- Susmita Bauri (born 1975), Indian politician
- Sushmita Mitra, Indian computer scientist
- Sushmita Sen (born 1975), Indian actress, model and winner of the 1994 Miss Universe pageant
- Sushmitha Singha Roy (born 1984), Indian heptathlete
- Susmita Bose, Indian-American scientist and engineer, professor at Washington State University
- Sushmita Mukherjee, an author and Indian actress who has starred in several Hindi movies and television shows.
