= Palash Baran Pal =

Indian physicist and author (born 1955)

Palash Baran Pal পলাশ বরন পাল
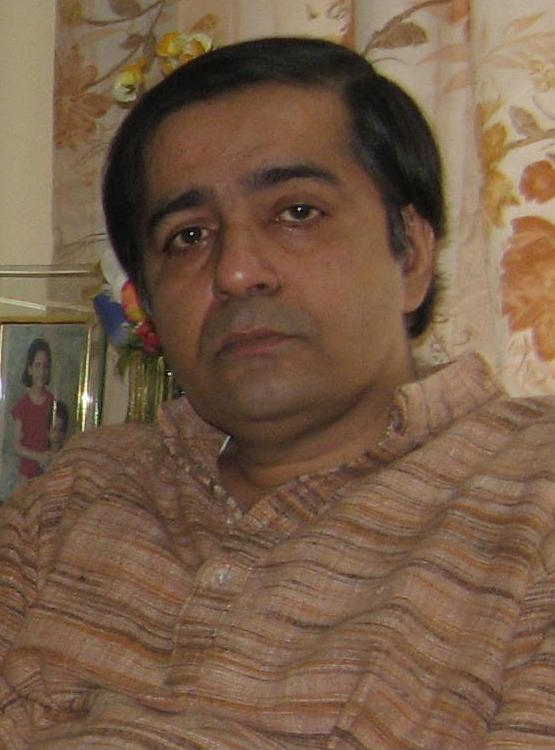
- Born: 4 September 1955 (age 71); Budge Budge, Kolkata, South 24 Parganas, West Bengal, India
- Education: Carnegie-Mellon University (PhD); Rajabazar Science College (MSc); Presidency College (BSc)
- Known for: Contributions to particle physics and Bengali literature
- Awards: 2004 Rabindra Smriti Puroshkar 2011 Ramendra Sundar Smriti Puroshkar
- Scientific career
- Fields: Physics (theoretical)
- Workplaces: Rajabazar Science College, Calcutta University, Kolkata; Saha Institute of Nuclear Physics, Kolkata; Indian Institute of Astrophysics, Bangalore
- Doctoral advisor: Lincoln Wolfenstein
- Website: palashbaranpal.github.io

Palash Baran Pal (Bengali: পলাশ বরন পাল Palāś Baran Pāl, born : 1955) is an Indian theoretical physicist, an Emeritus Professor in the Physics Department of Science College, Calcutta University, Kolkata, a writer, a linguist and a poet. His main area of research is Particle Physics. His works in the area of neutrino physics and relativistic treatment of particle properties in matter are well recognized in the particle physics community. Apart from his scientific contributions, he has authored well known text books in physics as well as several popular science literature in Bengali to popularize science. He was the first to create digital Bengali fonts for IBM PC (precursor of MS Windows).

== Early life ==
Born to Amulya Bhushan Pal and Niva Pal on 4 September 1955, Palash Pal is the eldest of three siblings. He did his schooling from BE College Model School at Howrah. He received his bachelor's degree in Physics from Presidency College, Kolkata (affiliated to Calcutta University, Calcutta, India) in 1975 and master's degree in Physics from the renowned Science College campus of Calcutta University, Calcutta, India in 1979. He then moved to United States for further studies. He received his Doctorate Degree from Carnegie-Mellon University, Pittsburgh, United States in the year 1983. After that, he was associated with University of Maryland, University of Massachusetts, University of Oregon and University of Texas respectively as post-doctoral fellow before he came back to India in 1994.

== Career ==
After he returned to India, Pal took up professorship at Indian Institute of Astrophysics, Bangalore, India in 1994 where he stayed till 1997 before he moved to Kolkata. He then joined the Theory Division of Saha Institute of Nuclear Physics, Kolkata where he remained in service till September 2017. He is now an Emeritus Professor in the Physics Department of Calcutta University, Kolkata.

Palash Pal has worked in various branches of modern physics. Primarily a particle physicist, his works encompass studies in the Standard Model of particle physics. Some of his pioneering works are particularly focused on the topic of massive neutrinos, whose theoretical basis requires physics beyond the Standard Model. His original contributions to the field of neutrino physics include calculation of Feynman diagrams for Majorana fermions., determination of properties of fermions in matters and magnetic fields, and a quantum field theoretic reworking of Lincoln Wolfenstein's formula predicting the properties of neutrino oscillation in presence of matter. His review on the neutrino physics gives a lucid description of the solar neutrino problem which appeals to a wider class of physicists.

Apart from his contributions to neutrino physics, Pal has done important work related to Grand Unification Theory and statistical field theory (popularly called thermal field theory). Some of his works deal with the quantum field theoretic calculations of self-energies of photon and neutrino in a background of charged particles (as electrons, positrons or charged weak gauge bosons) in thermal equilibrium. Pal has also ventured into calculations where the background for various elementary particle processes includes a thermal bath of charged particles in presence of constant magnetic field.

Palash Pal is also well known for his teaching and has taught various topics of modern physics in the teaching program of Saha Institute of Nuclear Physics. Most of the material he has taught have been later turned into books which includes subjects like particle physics, statistical physics and quantum field theory. Except these books Palash B. Pal and Rabindra N. Mohapatra have written the book titled Massive neutrinos in physics and astrophysics, which is a standard text for both newcomers and old practitioners working in the field of neutrino physics or astroparticle physics.

Pal started contributing to Bengali literature through popular science articles from as early as 1988. Eight such books and many other articles published in several magazines show his enthusiasm to reach out to an individual who has any scientific curiosity. His other writings in Bengali include several articles on Bengali phonetics, orthography and grammar, Bengali translations of poetries written in other foreign languages, such as the ones by Nobel Laureate Pablo Neruda, and folktales for children carry the signature of his varied interests in literature and linguistics. He has received two awards in the field of literature, Rabindra Smriti Puroshkar in 2004 and Ramendra Sundar Smriti Puroshkar in 2011, for his popular-level books Bigyān: byakti jukti somoy somāj (বিজ্ঞান: ব্যক্তি যুক্তি সময় সমাজ) and Einstein-er uttorādhikār (আইনস্টাইনের উত্তরাধিকার), respectively.

== Books ==
Besides many scientific papers, Palash Pal has written Physics textbooks in English, and popular-level scientific books and pedagogical scientific articles in Bengali. He has translated several poetries written in foreign languages, such as Spanish, French and Japanese, into Bengali. Among these, the Spanish and the French poetries are direct translations made from the original texts, whereas the collection of translation of Japanese Haikus was made from the English translations of these poetries. Pal's translation of the Spanish poetries written by Pablo Neruda is one of the first translations of an entire Spanish book into Bengali. Apart from that, Palash Pal has also translated several Bengali popular literature by other Bengali literary laureates into English. He has authored books on linguistics and folktales in Bengali. An exhaustive list of the books, authored by him so far, is as follows:

Academic books
Title	Description	Co-author	Publication details	Link
Massive Neutrinos in Physics and Astrophysics	A book on neutrino physics for researchers and students in the field	Rabindra N. Mahapatra	World Scientific, Singapore, 1991. [Enlarged editions: 1998, 2004.]	http://www.worldscientific.com/worldscibooks/10.1142/5024
A first book of Quantum Field Theory	A beginning level text book on Quantum Field Theory	Amitabha Lahiri	Narosa Publishing House, New Delhi, 2000. [Second edition 2005.]	http://www.narosa.com/books_display.asp?catgcode=978-81-7319-654-6
An introductory course of Statistical Mechanics	A text book on Statistical Mechanics for post-graduate as well as advanced undergraduate students		Narosa Publishing House, New Delhi, 2007 [Reprint 2013]	http://www.narosa.com/books_display.asp?catgcode=978-81-7319-864-9
An introductory course of Particle Physics	A text book on Particle Physics for post-graduate students as well as beginning researchers		CRC Press, July 2014	https://www.crcpress.com/An-Introductory-Course-of-Particle-Physics/Pal/p/book/9781482216981
A Physicists Introduction to Algebraic Structures	A text book on various topics of algebra which are useful for physicists. Detailed discussion of vector spaces, groups and topological spaces. Short introduction to many other algebraic structures like metric spaces, rings, fields, measure spaces, Boolean algebra.		Cambridge University Press, March 2019	http://www.cambridgeindia.org/Academic/subjects/Mathematics/A-Physicists-Introduction-to-Algebraic-Structures?ISBN=9781108729116
Introduction to Quantum Mechanics	A text book on Quantum Mechanics for advance undergraduate and post-graduate students as well as beginning researchers	Krishnendu Sengupta	Cambridge University Press, 2023	https://www.cambridge.org/in/universitypress/subjects/physics/quantum-physics-quantum-information-and-quantum-computation/introduction-quantum-mechanics?format=PB

Popular-level books
Title	Description	Co-author / Translator	Publication details
Ki diyé samastô-kichu gorhā, কী দিয়ে সমস্তকিছু গড়া — What is everything made of	Popular book on particle physics in Bengali		West Bengal State Book Board, Calcutta, 1988. [Second edition 1997.]
Sāl-tarikhér itihās, সাল তারিখের ইতিহাস — A history of dates and years	A book in Bengali on the development of calendars in various civilizations and its relation to the development of Astronomy		Samatat Prakashan, Calcutta, 1994. [Second edition, Sarat Book Distributors, Calcutta, 2003; Third edition 2015]
Ālôr kathā, আলোর কথা — On light	A book for children in Bengali on light		Shishu Sahitya Samsad, Calcutta, 1999. [Second edition 2005.]
Bigyān: byakti jukti somoy somāj, বিজ্ঞান: ব্যক্তি যুক্তি সময় সমাজ — Science: persons, arguments, time and society	A collection of popular scientific articles in Bengali		Anustup, Calcutta, 2001. [Editions: 2010, 2017 (ISBN No : 978-81-85479-20-0)]
Māpjôker itihās, মাপজোকের ইতিহাস — A history of measurements	A book in Bengali on the evolution of various units of measurement		Anustup, Calcutta, 2002. [2nd edition, Sarat Book Distributors, Calcutta, 2003]
Journey through time: a history of dates and years	English translation of his Bengali book Sāl-tarikhér itihās (সাল তারিখের ইতিহাস)	Translated by : Sushan Konar	Scholastic, New Delhi, January 2008. [Revised reprint April 2008]
Rong-berong, রঙ-বেরঙ — Colors	A book in Bengali on the science of colors and color perception, the technology of color production and reproduction	Co-author : Shekhar Guha	Jnan Bichitra, Agartala, 2010
Einstein-er uttorādhikār, আইনস্টাইনের উত্তরাধিকার — Einstein's legacy	Nine essays in Bengali, discussing various aspects of Einstein's work, his predecessors from whom he derived inspiration, and his impact on society and science		Bangiya Bijnan Parishad, Calcutta, 2011
At the root of things	English translation of his Bengali book Ki diyé samastô-kichu gorhā (কী দিয়ে সমস্তকিছু গড়া)	Translated by : Sushan Konar	CRC Press, August 2014.
Bigyan ebong, বিজ্ঞান এবং	12 essays on the relation of science with other aspects of human life and thoughts, e.g., Science and superstitions, Science and religion, Science and mathematics, Science and imagination		Ababhash, Calcutta, 2016
Sonkhya̅r jogot, সংখ্যার জগৎ — The world of numbers)	On numbers: their definition, classification, writing systems, uses and abuses		Nirjhar, Calcutta, 2022

Translations
Title	Translated from	Co-author	Publication details
Jekhāne brishtir janmô, যেখানে বৃষ্টির জন্ম	Pablo Neruda's "Donde nace la lluvia" (from the original Spanish)		Arunā Prokāshoni, Calcutta, 1988; [2nd edition, Paramparā Prakāshan, 2011]
Sutrapāt, সূত্রপাত	Isaac Asimov's "Beginnings"	Shekhar Guha	Anustup, Calcutta, 1997
Kathā, কথা	Jacques Prévért's "Paroles" (from the original French)		Anustup, Calcutta, 1997. [2nd printing 2010 (ISBN No : 978-81-85479-31-6)]
Bāshor Haiku, বাশো-র হাইকু	Japanese Haikus by Matsuo Basho		Ababhāsh, Calcutta, 2004
Selected Stories by Parashuram	English translation of Bengali short stories by Parashuram [Rajshekhar Bose]	Sukanta Chaudhuri	Penguin Books, New Delhi, 2006
Funny and funnier	English translation of Bengali short stories by Shirshendu Mukhopadhyay	Abhijit Gupta	Scholastic, New Delhi, 2010

Books on linguistics
Title	Description	Publication details
Dhwônimālā bornômālā, ধ্বনিমালা বর্ণমালা	A book on Bengali phonetics	Papyrus, Calcutta, 2001 [2nd edition: Anustup, Calcutta, 2015]
Ā môri Bānglā bhāshā, আ মরি বাংলা ভাষা	Collection of a number of essays on various aspects of language, orthography and grammar	Anushtup, Calcutta, 2011 (ISBN No: 978-81-85479-63-7)
Hok kothā, হক কথা	Collection of a number of short articles, written originally for newspaper supplements and literary magazines, on various aspects of language, orthography and grammar	Parampara Prakashan, Calcutta, 2013
Ek theke choy, এক থেকে ছয়	Six essays on problems of transliteration, terminologies, typefaces and orthography	Parampara Prakashan, Calcutta, 2016
Kothār kothā, কথার কথা	Collection of a number of short articles, written originally for newspaper supplements and literary magazines, on various aspects of language, orthography and grammar	Parampara Prakashan, Calcutta, 2020
Ka̅jer kotha̅, কাজের কথা	The first part is a compilation of all Bengali verbs. The second part is an analysis of the verb forms of standard Bengali	Anushtup, Calcutta, 2022

Miscellaneous
Title	Description	Publication details
Nānā desh nānā golpô, নানা দেশ নানা গল্প	Collection of folktales from all over the world	Shishu Sahitya Samsad, Calcutta, 2010; [Second printing 2012]
Poṭhôn pāṭhôn gobeshonā, পঠন পাঠন গবেষণা	On education and research	Jacari, 2012
Mohājonokothā, মহাজনকথা	Critical essays on eminent persons	Ababhāsh, 2024

== Software ==
Palash Pal has developed two latex based packages :

1. bangtex : for typesetting documents in Bangla using the Tex/Latex systems
2. pptalk : a Latex-based package for talk presentation

== Personal life ==
Palash Pal is married to Shukla Sanyal (শুক্লা সান্যাল), who was a professor of history at Calcutta University and Presidency University Kolkata, respectively, and has one daughter, Shoili Pal (শৈলী পাল), and one son, Proyag Pal (প্রয়াগ পাল).
