= Phoolan =

Phoolan is a given name. Notable people with this name include:

- Phoolan Devi (1963–2001), Indian bandit and politician
- Phoolan Prasad (born 1944), Indian mathematician

== See also ==
- Phoolan Hasina Ramkali, a 1993 Indian Hindi-language film
