= Meghnad Saha =

Indian astrophysicist and politician (1893–1956)

Meghnad Saha FRS
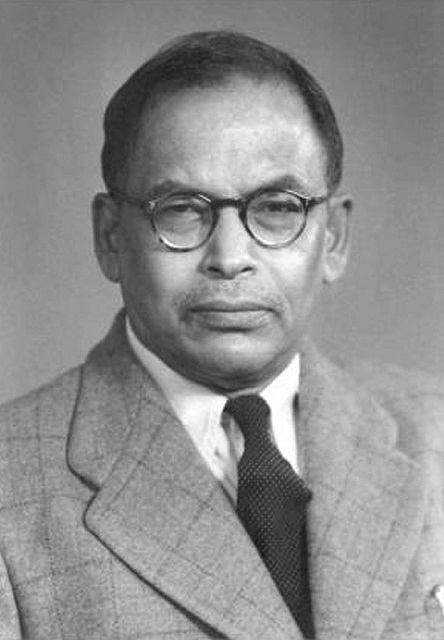
- Born: 6 October 1893; Seoratali, Dacca district, Bengal Presidency, British India (present-day Bangladesh)
- Died: 16 February 1956 (aged 62); New Delhi, India
- Education: Dhaka College; Dhaka Collegiate School: University of Calcutta; Presidency University; Rajabazar Science College
- Known for: Thermal ionisation; Saha ionization equation
- Spouse: Radha Rani Saha
- Scientific career
- Fields: Physics, astrophysics
- Workplaces: Allahabad University; Rajabazar Science College; University of Calcutta; Imperial College London; Indian Association for the Cultivation of Science
- Academic advisors: Jagdish Chandra Bose; Prafulla Chandra Ray
- Doctoral students: Samarendra Kumar Mitra; Daulat Singh Kothari

Member of Parliament, Lok Sabha
- In office 3 April 1952 – 16 February 1956
- Preceded by: Position established
- Succeeded by: Ashoke Kumar Sen
- Constituency: Calcutta North West

Personal details
- Party: Revolutionary Socialist Party (India)

Meghnad Saha (6 October 1893 – 16 February 1956) was an Indian astrophysicist and politician who helped devise the theory of thermal ionisation. His Saha ionisation equation allowed astronomers to accurately relate the spectral classes of stars to their actual temperatures.

== Biography ==
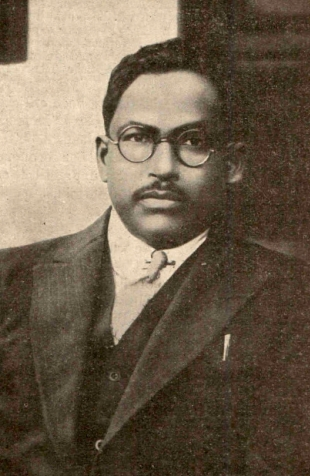
Meghnad Saha c. 1934

Meghnad Saha was born on 6 October 1893 to a lower-caste Bengali Hindu Shunri (Teli) family in the village of Sheoratali in Gazipur, then part of the Dacca district of the Bengal Presidency (now Bangladesh). He was the fifth of eight children born to Jagannath Saha, a poor shopkeeper, and his wife, Bhubaneshwari Devi. Having faced casteism in his childhood and professional life, Saha grew to detest the caste system and Orthodox Hinduism from a young age. During his time, the caste system in Bengal was rigid, unlike today when it is minimal compared to the rest of India.

During his youth, he was forced to leave Dhaka Collegiate School because he participated in the Swadeshi movement. After that, he joined K. L. Jubilee High School & College. He earned his Indian School Certificate from Dhaka College. He was also a student at the Presidency College, Kolkata and Rajabazar Science College CU. Saha faced caste-based discrimination while a student at the Eden Hindu Hostel; among them, communal students objected to him eating in the same dining hall as them.

He was a professor at Allahabad University from 1923 to 1938, and thereafter a professor and Dean of the Faculty of Science at the University of Calcutta until he died in 1956. He became a Fellow of the Royal Society in 1927. He was president of the 21st session of the Indian Science Congress in 1934.

Amongst Saha's classmates were Satyendra Nath Bose, Jnan Ghosh, and Jnanendra Nath Mukherjee. In his later life, he was close to Amiya Charan Banerjee.

== Career ==
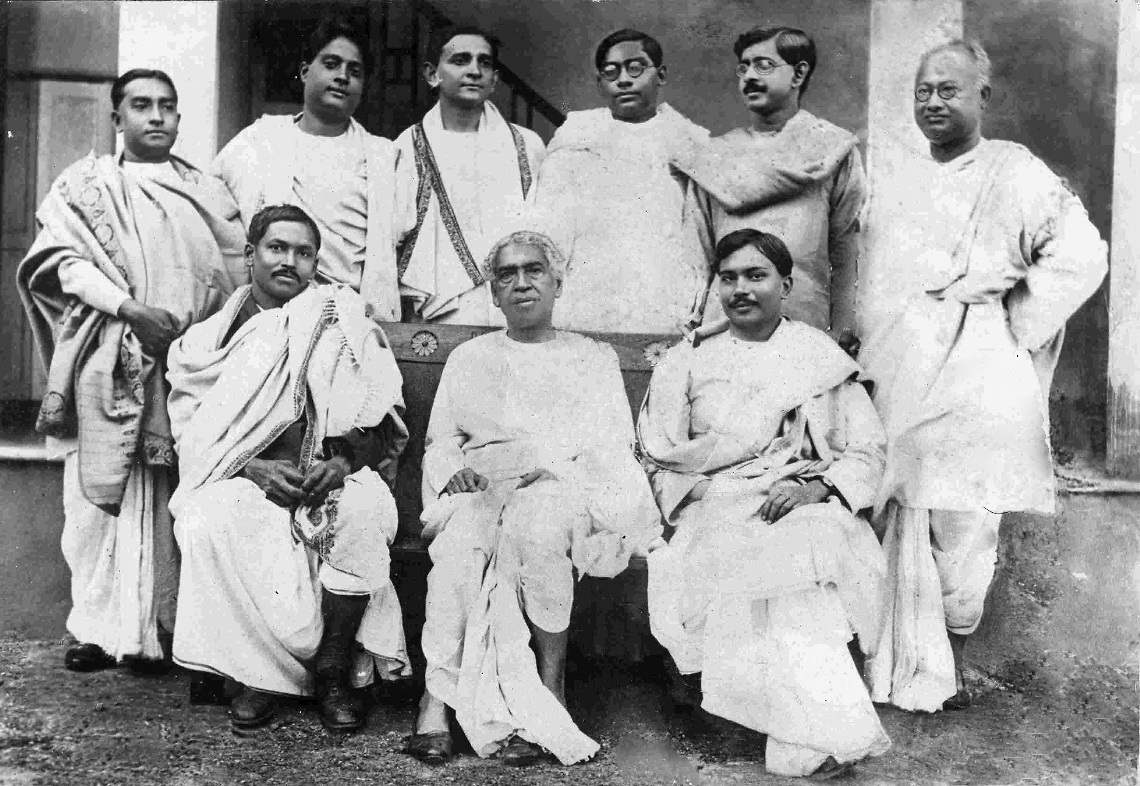
Saha (seated on left) with other scientists at Calcutta University

Saha's study of the thermal ionisation of elements led him to formulate what is known as the Saha ionisation equation. This equation is one of the basic tools for interpreting the spectra of stars. By studying the spectra of stars, one can find their temperature and, using Saha's equation, determine the ionisation state of the elements making up the star. This was extended by Ralph H. Fowler and Edward Arthur Milne. Saha had previously reached the following conclusion on the subject:

It will be admitted from what has gone before that the temperature plays the leading role in determining the nature of the stellar spectrum. Too much importance must not be attached to the figures given, for the theory is only a first attempt for quantitatively estimating the physical processes taking place at high temperature. We have practically no laboratory data to guide us, but the stellar spectra may be regarded as unfolding to us, in an unbroken sequence, the physical processes succeeding each other as the temperature is continually varied from 3000 K to 40,000 K.

Saha also invented an instrument to measure the weight and pressure of solar rays.

Meghnad Saha helped to establish several scientific institutions, including the Physics Department at Allahabad University in United Provinces (now Uttar Pradesh) and the Institute of Nuclear Physics (now Saha Institute of Nuclear Physics) in Calcutta. He founded the journal Science and Culture and was the editor until his death. He was the leading figure in organising several scientific societies, such as the National Academy of Science (1930), the Indian Physical Society (1934), and the Indian Institute of Science (1935). He was the director at the Indian Association for the Cultivation of Science from 1953 to 1956. The Saha Institute of Nuclear Physics, founded in 1943 in Kolkata, is named after him.

Saha stood as a candidate for North-West Calcutta in the 1951 Lok Sabha election. He ran as a member of the Union of Socialists and Progressives, but maintained his independence from the party. His goal was to improve the planning of education, industrialisation, healthcare, and river valley development. He was up against Prabhu Dayal Himatsingka. Due to low funding for his campaign, Saha wrote to the publisher of his textbook Treatise on Heat to ask for an advance of ₹5000. He was elected by a margin of 16%.

Saha participated in the areas of education, refugees, rehabilitation, atomic energy, multipurpose river projects, flood control, and long-term planning. On the dust jacket flap of the book Meghnad Saha in Parliament, Saha is described as:

"Never unduly critical... forthright, so incisive, so thorough in pointing out lapses that the treasury bench was constantly on the defensive. This is brought out by the way he was accused of leaving his laboratory and straying into a territory not his own. But the reason why he was slowly drifting towards this public role (he was never a politician in the correct sense of the term) was the gradually widening gulf between his dream and the reality—between his vision of an industrialised India and the Government implementation of the plan."

Saha was the chief architect of river planning in India and prepared the original plan for the Damodar Valley Project. His own observation with respect to his transition into government projects and political affairs was:

Scientists are often accused of living in the "Ivory Tower" and not troubling their mind with realities and apart from my association with political movements in my juvenile years, I had lived in ivory tower up to 1930. But science and technology are as important for administration now-a-days as law and order. I have gradually glided into politics because I wanted to be of some use to the country in my own humble way.

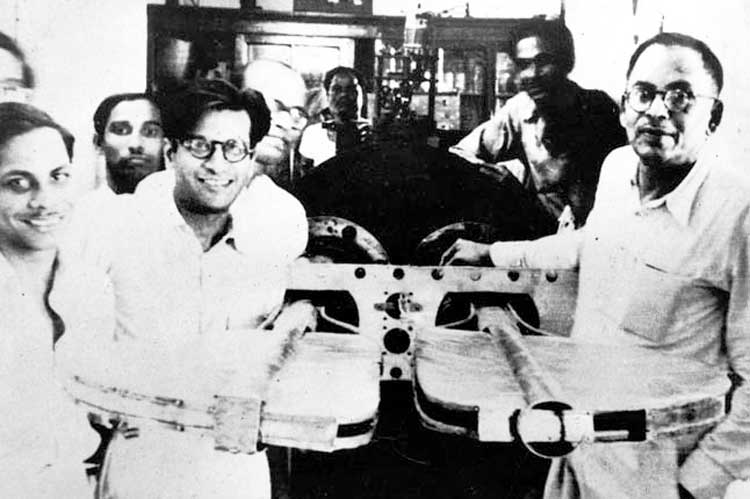
Meghnad Saha

== Personal life ==
In 1905, while the Banga-bhanga movement was underway, Saha had taken part in a movement protesting against the British Governor visiting his school and was thus expelled.

Saha married Radha Rani Saha on 16 June 1918. They had a total of 7 children: 3 sons and 4 daughters.

Saha was an atheist.

== Death ==
Saha died on the way to the hospital on 16 February 1956 after suffering a cardiac arrest. He was going to the office of the Planning Commission in the Rashtrapati Bhavan. It was reported he had been dealing with hypertension for ten months before his death. His remains were cremated at the Keoratola crematorium, Kolkata, the following day.

== Tributes ==
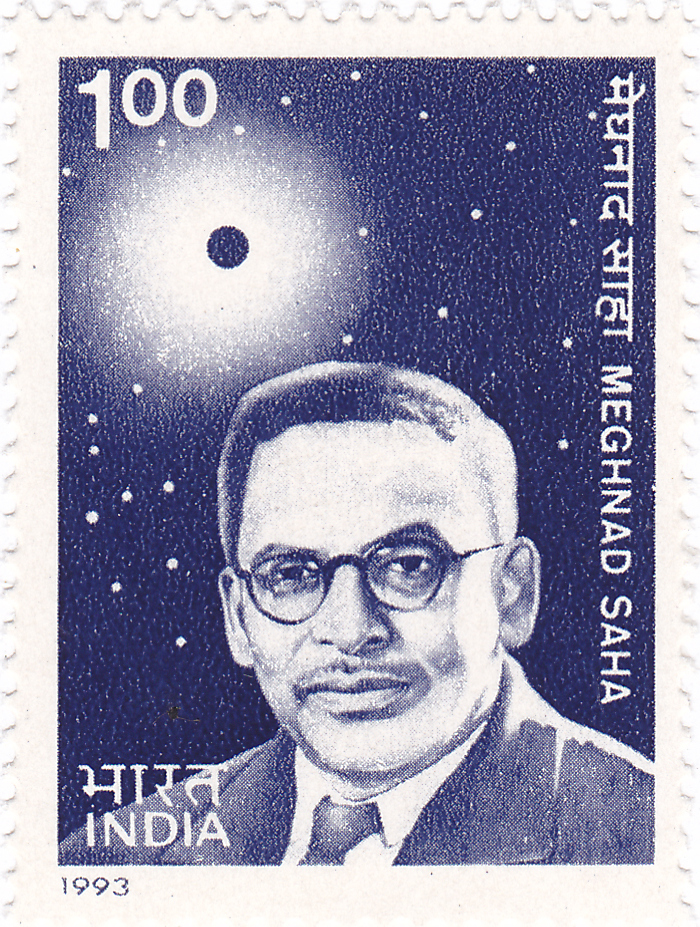
Meghnad Saha 1993 stamp of India

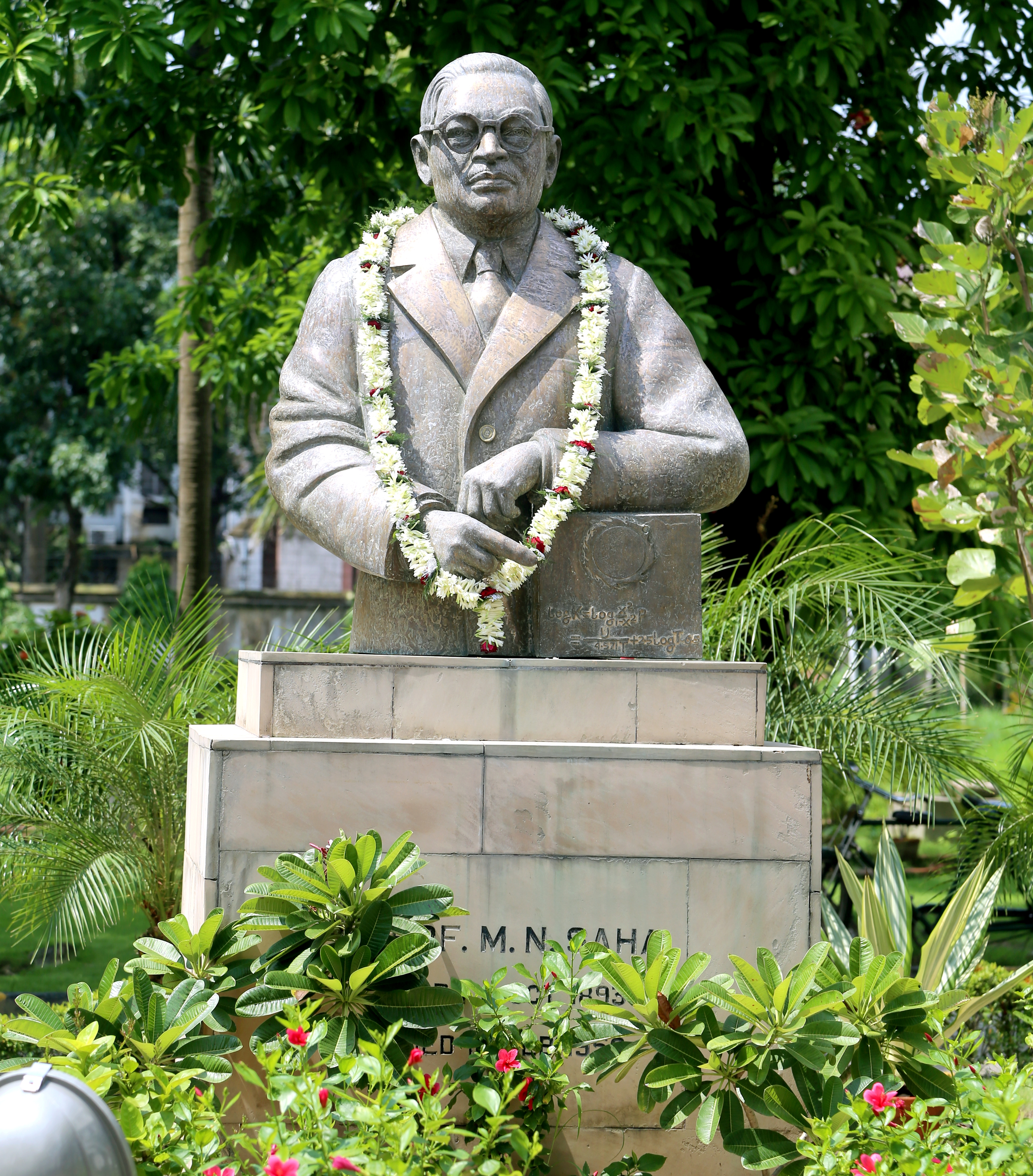
Bust of Saha at Indian Association for the Cultivation of Science

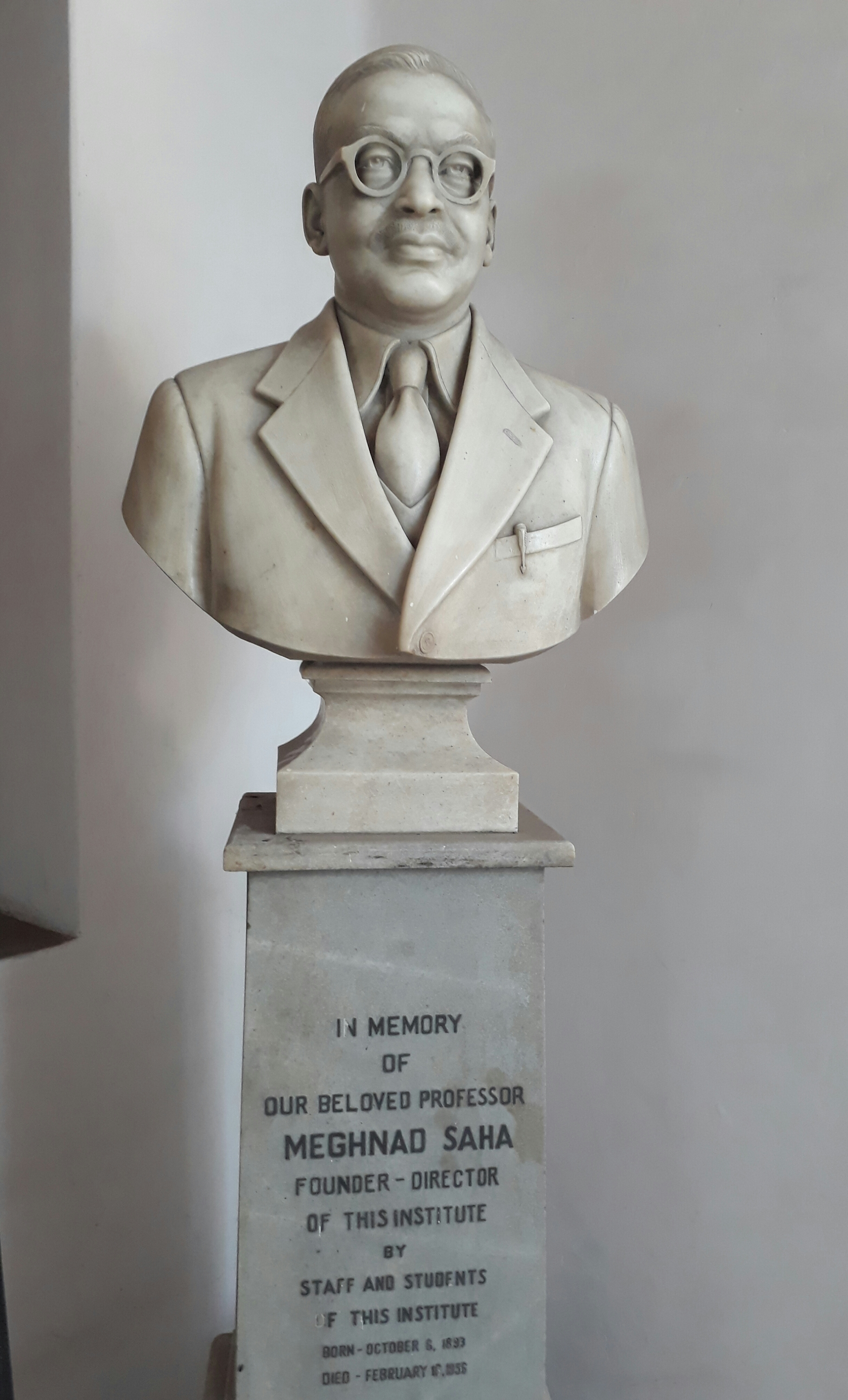
Statue of Saha, University College of Science, Technology & Agriculture

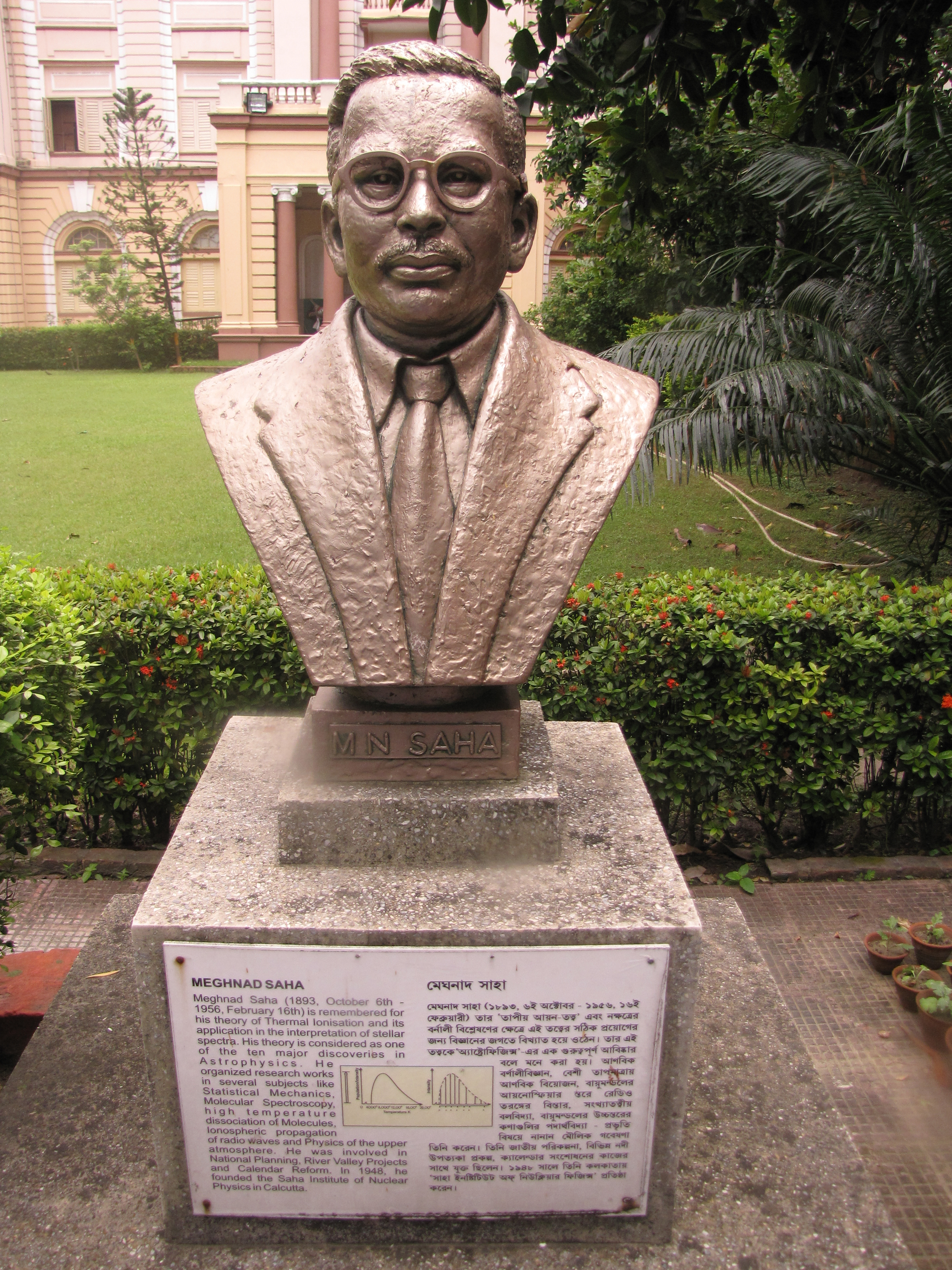
Bust of Saha at Birla Industrial & Technological Museum

- "Meghnad Saha's ionization equation (c. 1920), which opened the door to stellar astrophysics, was one of the top ten achievements of 20th-century Indian science [and] could be considered in the Nobel Prize class." — Jayant Narlikar
- "The impetus given to astrophysics by Saha's work can scarcely be overestimated, as nearly all later progress in this field has been influenced by it and much of the subsequent work has the character of refinements of Saha's ideas." — Svein Rosseland
- "He (Saha) was extremely simple, almost austere, in his habits and personal needs. Outwardly, he sometimes gave an impression of being remote, matter-of-fact, and even harsh, but once the outer shell was broken, one invariably found in him a person of extreme warmth, deep humanity, sympathy and understanding; and though almost altogether unmindful of his own personal comforts, he was extremely solicitous in the case of others. It was not in his nature to placate others. He was a man of undaunted spirit, resolute determination, untiring energy and dedication." — Daulat Singh Kothari
