= Asok Kumar Barua =

Indian condensed matter physicist (1936–2021)

Asok Kumar Barua (A.K.Barua)
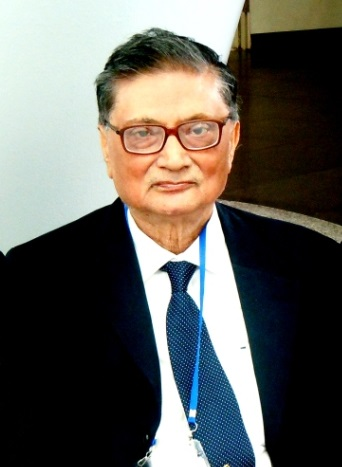
- Born: 1 July 1936; Calcutta, West Bengal, British India
- Died: 30 May 2021 (aged 84); Kolkata, West Bengal, India
- Education: Presidency College (B.Sc.); Rajabazar Science College (M.Sc.); IACS (Ph.D.)
- Occupation: Condensed matter physicist
- Years active: Since 1964
- Known for: Solar Photovoltaics, Optics and Optoelectronics
- Awards: Padma Shri; Distinguished Materials Scientist of the Year Award; Photovoltaic Science and Engineering Conference Award; ICSC-Materials Science prize

Asok Kumar Barua (1 July 1936 – 30 May 2021) was an Indian condensed matter physicist and the honorary Emeritus Professor of Indian Institute of Engineering Science and Technology, Shibpur, who focused on research in optics and optoelectronics. He was honoured by the Government of India in 2003 with Padma Shri, the fourth highest Indian civilian award.

== Biography ==
Asok Kumar Barua was born on 1 July 1936 in Kolkata in the Indian state of West Bengal. He did his schooling at Hare School and graduated in Physics with honours from the Presidency College, Kolkata. His masters studies were at the Rajabazar Science College, Kolkata University (1956) after which he secured his PhD in 1960 from the Indian Association for the Cultivation of Science (IACS) under the guidance of Professor B. N. Srivastava. After completing his post doctoral research in USA, he started his career in 1964 by joining IACS as a Reader where he became a professor in 1971, a director in 1982 and worked there till 1989.

Barua had done research in optics and optoelectronics and had been credited with the indigenous development of amorphous silicon (a-Si) solar cells and solar modules including production technology and equipment. He was also known to have developed a process for Radar opaque coating of aircraft canopies and windshields. His researches have been documented by way of over 300 scientific papers published in peer reviewed journals of international stature. He had also mentored several students in their doctoral research.

An honorary professor of the Indian Institute of Engineering Science and Technology, Shibpur from 2010-2018, Barua was an elected fellow of the Indian Academy of Sciences, Bangalore and the West Bengal Academy of Science and Technology. He had held the chair of the Research and Development committee of the Ministry of New and Renewable Energy under the Jawaharlal Nehru National Solar Mission on solar photovoltaics. He had been a member of the Task Force on Solar Research Initiatives set up by the Department of Science and Technology. He had served the Asia Pacific Academy of Materials as its member, the Sixth International Photovoltaic Science and Engineering Conference as its chairman, the Indian Physical Society as its president and Birla Industrial and Technological Museum as the chairman of its governing council. He was also associated with Hhv Center For Advanced Photovoltaic Technologies as an additional director.

Barua received the Distinguished Materials Scientist of the Year Award in 2002 from the Materials Research Society of India. The Government of India honoured him in 2003 with the civilian award of Padma Shri. He was also a recipient of the Photovoltaic Science and Engineering Conference Award from the Solar Energy Society of India and ICSC-Materials Science prize of the Materials Research Society of India.

Barua died from COVID-19 in Kolkata on 30 May 2021, at the age of 84.

== See also ==
- Optics
- Optoelectronics
