= Samarendra Kumar Mitra =

Indian computer scientist (1916–1998)

- সমরেন্দ্র কুমার মিত্র
- Born: 14 March 1916; Calcutta, British India
- Died: 26 September 1998 (aged 82); Kolkata
- Education: Presidency College (University of Calcutta); Rajabazar Science College (University of Calcutta)
- Known for: Designed, developed and constructed India's first indigenous computer (an electronic analog computer) in ISI in 1953
- Awards: Cunningham Memorial Prize in Chemistry
- Scientific career
- Fields: Chemistry; Computer science
- Workplaces: Indian Statistical Institute; Council of Scientific & Industrial Research (CSIR, India); Harvard University; Institute for Advanced Study, Princeton, United States; Mathematical Laboratory, University of Cambridge, U.K.; Palit Laboratory of Physics, University of Calcutta; UNTAA Adviser on Computing, Moscow
- Doctoral advisor: Meghnad Saha
- Other academic advisors: S. N. Bose

Notes
- Mitra was recognized as the father of computers in India by the Calcutta Mathematical Society

Samarendra Kumar Mitra (14 March 1916 – 26 September 1998) was an Indian scientist and mathematician. He designed, developed and constructed, in 1953-54, India's first computer (an electronic analog computer) at the Indian Statistical Institute (ISI), Calcutta (presently Kolkata). He began his career as a research physicist at the Palit Laboratory of Physics, Rajabazar Science College (University of Calcutta). In 1950, he joined the Indian Statistical Institute (ISI), Calcutta, an Institute of National importance, where he worked in various capacities such as professor, research professor and director.

Mitra was the founder and first head of the Computing Machines and Electronics Division at the Indian Statistical Institute (ISI), Calcutta.

In 1953-54, India's first indigenous electronic analogue computer for solving linear equations with 10 variables and related problems was designed and developed by Samarendra Kumar Mitra and was built under his direct personal supervision and guidance by Ashish Kumar Maity in the Computing Machines and Electronics Laboratory at the (ISI), Calcutta. This computer was used in computation of numerical solutions of simultaneous linear equations using a modified version of Gauss–Seidel iteration.

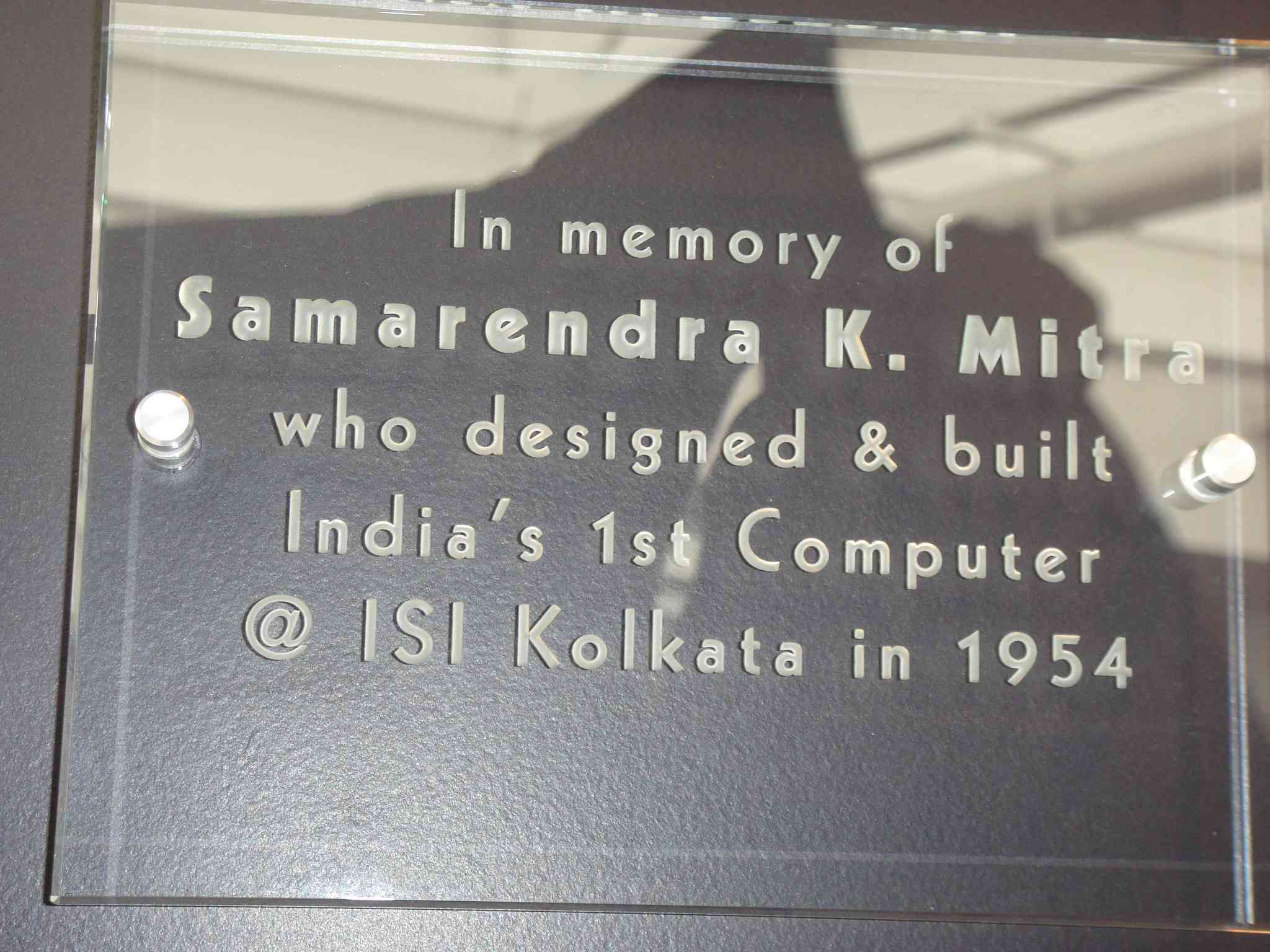
Commemoration plaque at the Computer History Museum, Mountain View, California, USA

Subsequently, in 1963, the ISI, Calcutta began design and development of the first second-generation indigenous digital computer of India in joint collaboration with Jadavpur University (JU), Calcutta.

This collaboration was primarily led by Mitra, as he was the Head of the Computing Machines and Electronics Laboratory, ISI. He designed, developed, and constructed a general purpose High Speed Electronic Digital Computer, namely called the ISIJU computer (Indian Statistical Institute – Jadavpur University Computer). Under the leadership of Mitra, the first second-generation indigenous digital computer of India was produced, namely the transistor-driven machine ISIJU-1, which became operational in 1964.

The Computer and Communication Sciences Division of Indian Statistical Institute (ISI) was started under Samarendra Kumar Mitra and has produced many eminent scientists. The first annual convention of the Computer Society of India (CSI) was hosted by ISI in 1965. Mitra was a self-taught scholar with wide-ranging interests in varied fields such as mathematics, physics, chemistry, biology, poultry science, Sanskrit language, philosophy, religion and literature.

== Biography ==
Samarendra Kumar Mitra known as “the father of Indian computer revolution" was born on 14 March 1916, in Calcutta, the eldest of two children. He was the only son and had a younger sister. His father was Sir Rupendra Coomar Mitter and his mother was Lady Sudhahasinee Mitter. His father, Sir Rupendra Coomar Mitter, was an MSc in mathematics, gold medalist and also a gold medalist in Law from the University of Calcutta and was an advocate by profession who practiced in the Calcutta High Court from 1913 to 1934. In 1934, Sir Rupendra Coomar Mitter was appointed as a Judge, Calcutta High Court and was Chief Justice (Acting) in 1947 during independence of India and continued as a Judge until 1950. Additionally, he was knighted in 1946. Thereafter, he was the Chairman of the Labour Appellate Tribunal from 1950 to 1955.

== Education ==
Samarendra Kumar Mitra studied at the Bowbazar High School, Calcutta, and completed his Matriculation in 1st Division in 1931. In 1933, he did his Intermediate in Science (I.Sc.) in 1st Division from Presidency College (presently Presidency University), Calcutta (now Kolkata). In 1935, he did his Bachelor in Science with Honours (B.Sc. Hons) in Chemistry, with 2nd rank, from Presidency College (presently Presidency University), Calcutta (now Kolkata) and was awarded the Cunningham Memorial Prize in Chemistry. In 1937, he completed his Master in Science (M.Sc.) Chemistry and in 1940 his Master in Science (M.Sc.) in Applied Mathematics from the Rajabazar Science College, University of Calcutta, Calcutta. In later years, he was working towards his PhD in Physics under Professor Meghnad Saha, but did not pursue it after his mentor's death in 1956.

== Career ==
He worked as a research physicist under the Council of Scientific & Industrial Research (CSIR, India) scheme on the design and development of an air-driven ultracentrifuge, at the Palit Laboratory of Physics, University of Calcutta, from 1944 to 1948.

He was awarded an UNESCO Special Fellowship on the study of High Speed Computing Machines in the United States of America and the United Kingdom during 1949–50 and worked at Harvard University, Institute for Advanced Study, Princeton, United States and at the Mathematical Laboratory, University of Cambridge, U.K. During his time at the Institute for Advanced Study, he became close with numerous eminent physicists and mathematicians, such as Albert Einstein, Wolfgang Pauli, John von Neumann. And, attended lectures of Niels Bohr and Robert Oppenheimer. In fact, it is known that he had many discussions with Albert Einstein and spent a lot of his time with him (while he was at Princeton).

He worked in various capacities from 1950 to 1976 at the Indian Statistical Institute (ISI), Calcutta, such as, professor, research professor and director.

The Computing Machines and Electronics Division at the ISI, Calcutta was founded by Mitra.

In 1953-54 he designed and constructed the first computer built in India. This was an electronic analogue computer for solving linear equations with ten variables and related problems.

He was UNTAA Adviser on Computing, Moscow, and was responsible for bringing a massive technical aid to India from the U.S.S.R, amounting to nearly one crore rupees under UNTTA, 1955.

He was an adviser to the Ministry of Defense, Government of India, for computation of ballistic trajectories. Under his advice the firing table for the first gun produced in India in 1962 was made.

He was a member of the Indian National Committee for Space Research from 1962 to 64.

In 1963, he was the leader of the team for the design and construction of a general purpose high speed electronic digital computer, the ISI-JU computer (Indian Statistical Institute-Jadavpur University).

He was a Technical Adviser during 1969–1976 to the Union Public Service Commission, Government of India.

He had several research publications in mathematics, theoretical physics, and computer science.

He travelled on work to United States, United Kingdom, Soviet Union, Switzerland, France, Czechoslovakia and Afghanistan.

He was a member of the Calcutta Mathematical Society, Indian Association for the Cultivation of Science, Association for Computing Machinery, U.S. and the Indian Statistical Institute, India.

He was Professor Emeritus and chairman, Calcutta Mathematical Society and Professor of the N.R. Sen Center for Pedagogical Mathematics.

His other interests included translating from Sanskrit books of Scientific interest, such as Vaisheshik Darshan by Maharishi Kanada, a Hindu sage and philosopher.
