= Jnanendra Nath Mukherjee =

Indian colloid chemist (1893–1983)

Jnanendra Nath Mukherjee CBE, FRSC
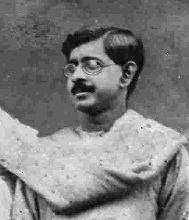
- Born: 23 April 1893; Mahadevpur, Rajshahi District, Bengal Presidency
- Died: 10 May 1983 (aged 90); Calcutta, India
- Education: University of Calcutta
- Known for: Boundary method
- Awards: Padma Bhushan

Jnanendra Nath Mukherjee CBE, FRSC was an Indian colloid chemist.

== Early life ==
Mukherjee was born on 23 April 1893 to a Bengali Brahmin in the village of Mahadevpur in Rajshahi District, Bengal Presidency (now Bangladesh). He was the eldest son of his parents, Shri Durgadas Mukherjee and Shrimati Saratshashi Devi. His father had a brilliant academic career and became the Principal of the Raj Chandra College, Barisal. He gave it up later in favour of a Provincial Judicial Service. Mukherjee lost his father when he was only twelve years old, and was brought up along with his younger brother.

== Education ==
From the Municipal high School, Burdwan, Mukherjee appeared in March 1909 at the last Entrance Examination of the Calcutta University and got a District Scholarship. Jnanendra Nath was a student of Presidency College (1909–1915) and received his BSc (1913) and MSc (1915) degrees from the Rajabazar Science College, Calcutta University. Based on his thesis for MSc Degree a paper on Electric Synthesis of Colloids was published in the Journal of the American Chemical Society (1915,39,292).

== Academic and research achievements ==
=== School of Colloid Science ===
Professor Mukherjee's first work was done independently, while he was a MSc student of the Presidency College, his work on colloids was published in the Journal of the American Chemical Society in 1915. In 1919 he and Jnan Chandra Ghosh joined the University College, London to work in the Physical Chemistry Laboratory under the charge of Professor FG Donnan, FRS. Professor Mukherjee continued his research on colloids and his major line of work was to develop his theory of the electrokinetic double layer and its ionic constitution. JN Mukherjee's work on the electrochemistry of colloids is considered highly significant. He is also well known for the boundary method he developed for determining the cataphoretic speed of colloid particles.

=== School of Soil Science ===
Dr Mukherjee was able to foresee how basic soil colloid studies could be of help in understanding many of the soil properties and problems. He brought to use in the study of the soil all the tools and techniques he had been developing and improving through years of patient research. In 1942, with N.C. Sen Gupta, he developed a simple rotary viscometer for the study of anomalous viscous properties. In 1944, he developed the method of differentiation of crude oils based on chromatography capillary analysis and fluorescence in UV light.

=== Agricultural research development ===
Besides making pioneering contribution in the domain of Soil Science, Dr Mukherjee played a key role in the development of agricultural research and education in the country. Soon after his appointment as Director of the Imperial (now Indian Agricultural Research Institute, New Delhi), in 1945, Dr Mukherjee began to reorganise the research and educational activities of the Institute in the country as a whole. Under his direction the Institute expanded considerably in terms of its academic activities and scientific performance. He initiated research in the area of soil-plant studies. Some of the sections he created in the Division of Soil Science and Agricultural Chemistry are Soil Survey, Soil Physics, Agricultural Chemistry, Soil Fertility, Soil Microbiology, Biochemistry, Organic Chemistry and Spectroscopy. Recent expansion of some of the sections such as Soil Survey, Microbiology, Biochemistry, Agricultural Chemicals, Agricultural Physics were credited to him. The credit for initiating systematic studies on micronutrient elements in soils and plants and also on clay mineralogy of soils with the help of sophisticated instruments and modern techniques goes to him. He initiated work in the institute on the nutritive value of foods, feeds and fodders, on insecticides and fungicides, and on the chemistry of plant products. He was the first in the country to lay great emphasis on the importance of soil surveys for agricultural development and underlined the importance of uniformity in the methods of survey, classification and nomenclature of the soils of India. At his suggestion the Ministry of Agriculture, Government of India established in 1949 the Central Committee on Soil Science with him as chairman. The terms and reference of the committee were practically in conformity with the objectives of the All India Soil and Land Use Survey Organization established in 1956 with 4 regional centres. The soil map of India revised under his guidance (scale 1" --- 70 miles) showing 20 soil classes was published in 1954. He also developed the concept of the basic soil regions in the classifications of the soils of India based on similar characteristics of land viz.., the climate, topography, vegetation and soils.

=== Agricultural education ===
Professor Mukherjee proposed the idea of making the Indian Agricultural Research Institute (IARI), a regular University. In 1958, on the recommendation of the Indo-American Team on Agricultural Research and Education and with the generous aid of the Rockefeller Foundation, the Post-Graduate School was established at this Institute by the Governmental of India. The Institute now enjoys the status of a university under the University Grants Commission Act of 1956.

== Positions served ==
- Professor of Chemistry, University College of Science and Technology,
- Calcutta Director, Indian Agricultural Research Institute
- Director, Central Building Research Institute, Roorkee
- Part-time Scientific Adviser, Departments of Agriculture, Animal Husbandry, Irrigation, Forest, Community Development, Government of West Bengal
- Administrator, Boardof Secondary Education, West Bengal
- Member, Union Public Service Commission
- President, State College of Agriculture of West, Bengal
- President, Indian Science Congress Association
- President, Indian Chemical Society
- President, Indian Society of Soil Science
- President, Indian Association for the Cultivation of Science
- Founder and honorary Secretary of Indian Chemical Society
- President, Indian Science News Association
- President, Indian Society of Soil and Water Conservation
- Vice-president, Indian Statistical Institute
- Member, Foundation Committee
- Fellow, Indian National Science Academy
- Fellow, Asiatic Society
- Member, Chemical Society, London
- Member, General Assembly, Board of Executive Committee of the International Council of Scientific Unions
- Chairman, Export Fertilizer Committee
- Chairman, Homeopathic Enquiry Committee
- Chairman, Research Committee, Department of Agriculture, Govt. of West Bengal
- Chairman Land Utilization Board, Govt. of West Bengal
- Chairman, Research Committee, CSIR
- Member, Technical Committee and Board, CSIR
- Member, Senate and Board of Accounts, University of Calcutta
- Secretary (Science), Re organisation Committee, University of Calcutta
- Chairman, several scientific committees of ICAR
- Leader of the Indian Delegation to the VI Committees of the International Society of Soil Science, Holland (ii)the Third Congress of the International Society of Soil Science, Oxford (iii) the Imperial Agricultural Bureau Review Conference, London
- Member, Indian Scientific Mission of the Govt. of India to UK, USA, and Canada
- Member, Indian Delegation to the Royal Society Empire Scientific and British Commonwealth Official Scientific Conference, London
- Member, Indian Delegation to the United National Scientific Conference on the Conservation and Utilization of Resources, Lake Success, USA
- Member, Indian Delegation to the Second Congress of the Pan Indian Ocean Scientific Association, Perth, Australia
- Delegate to the Conference on Tropical and Subtropical Soils, Rothamsted
- President, Board of Trustees, Surendranath Trust, Calcutta.

== Awards and honours ==
- Padma Bhushan (1964)
- Commander of the Order of the British Empire (CBE) (1943 Birthday Honours)
- Fellow of Indian Academy of Science, Bangalore, Indian Chemical Association and Royal Society of Chemistry (London)
- Founder Secretary, Indian Chemical Society, President (1935–36), Indian Society of Soil Science
- Member, Council (1935–38) and as vice-president (1941–42)
- Foreign Secretary, INSA (1943–44) and (1947–51)
- General President, Indian Science Congress Association (1952).
