= Chitra Dutta =

Indian physicist

- Education: Rajabazar Science College; Visva-Bharati University; Calcutta University
- Scientific career
- Fields: Bioinformatics, Computational Biology
- Workplaces: Indian Institute of Chemical Biology

Chitra Dutta is a former chief scientist and head of Structural Biology and Bioinformatics division in CSIR-Indian Institute of Chemical Biology, Kolkata, India. She is a physicist working in the areas of bioinformatics and computational biology. She is engaged in 'in-silico' analysis of genome/proteome architectures of host/vector/pathogen systems in quest of novel intervention strategies. Comparative genome analysis of various bacterial, viral and parasitic pathogens conducted by her group have not only given an insight into the natural forces driving the molecular evolution of the microbial world, but also provided a better understanding of the intricacies of pathogen–host interactions and co-evolution. She has demonstrated how the relative strengths of various selection pressures vary within and across the organisms depending on their G+C-content, life-style and taxonomic distribution. Her group has also delineated the role played by mutational imbalance, hydrophobicity, gene expressivity and aromaticity in shaping microbial protein architectures. She is also internationally acclaimed for her studies on ‘Chaos game representation’. She has developed novel algorithms for recognition of fractal patterns in nucleotide and amino acid sequences through statistical analyses of genome and proteome composition of different thermophilic, symbiotic/parasitic organisms and she has revealed that thermal adaptation involves overrepresentation of purine bases in mRNAs, higher GC-content of the structural RNAs and enhanced usage of positively charged residues and aromatic residues at the cost of neutral polar residues, while the parasitic adaptation is reflected in the extreme genome reduction, presence of weak translational selection and large heterogeneity in membrane associated proteins. Recent works from her group on 'pan-genomic analysis of human microbiome in health and diseases' have also been highly acknowledged in scientific literature.

Chitra Dutta completed her B.Sc. in physics, chemistry and mathematics in 1976 and M.Sc. in physics in 1977, both from Visva-Bharati university. She completed her Ph.D. in physics from CSIR-Indian Institute of Chemical Biology, University of Calcutta in 1984. Among honours and awards conferred on her are Fellowship of National Academy of Sciences (1992), DBT Overseas Associateship (1994), The Young Physicist Award (1985), The Special Prize for Academic Achievement- Jawaharlal Nehru Memorial Fund (1978), National Merit Scholarship, Govt. of India (1976) etc. She is a member of the Advisory Committee on Bioinformatics, Department of Science & Technology, WB. She has been regularly involved in the review of manuscripts for reputed International journals. She is also involved in teaching at the post-graduate levels in Calcutta University, Visva-Bharati and West Bengal University of Technology.
