= Ashesh Prosad Mitra =

Indian physicist (1927–2007)

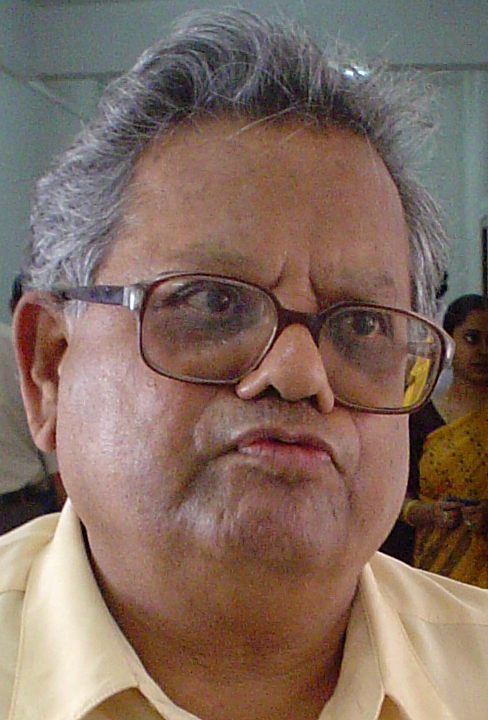
- Born: 21 February 1927; Kolkata, West Bengal
- Died: 3 September 2007 (aged 80); New Delhi
- Citizenship: Indian
- Education: Rajabazar Science College; University of Calcutta
- Known for: Radio & Space Physics
- Awards: Padma Bhushan, 1987

Ashesh Prosad Mitra FNA, FASc, FRS (21 February 1927 – 3 September 2007) was a physicist who headed the National Physics Laboratory in Delhi, India, and was the director general of the Council of Scientific and Industrial Research (CSIR). He is primarily known for his work on environmental physics.

== Life ==
Mitra studied at the Bangabasi College, an affiliated college of the University of Calcutta. He completed his post graduation studies from the renowned Rajabazar Science College campus of same university.

He was the director of the National Physical Laboratory (NPL) from 1982 to 1986 and the director general of the Council of Scientific and Industrial Research (CSIR) from 1986 to 1991.

He died at New Delhi in September 2007.

== Research ==
Radio and space physics was his area of specialization. He performed major work in the field of earth's near-space environment, through group based and space techniques. He worked on cosmic radio noise for studying the upper atmosphere led to a series of discoveries in ionosphere, solar physics and cosmic rays.

== Honours and awards ==
- He was awarded the Shanti Swarup Bhatnagar Prize for Physical Science in 1968. The citation read:
  Dr Mitra is one of the acknowledged authorities on ionosphere and on some aspects of space research. His pioneering work on the use of cosmic radio noise for upper atmosphere studies resulted in a whole series of scientific discoveries in ionosphere, solar physics and cosmic rays. He has carried out comprehensive studies on the ionospheric effects of solar flares and has established one of the most extensive radio flare systems at the National Physical Laboratory. He developed an atmospheric model from observations of satellite drag and initiated new D region rocket experiments. Dr Mitra's work on ion and neutral chemistry in the upper atmosphere, especially on the minor constituent nitric oxide, provided the basis for much of our present knowledge about the lower ionosphere. He has contributed substantially to the establishment and operation of the International Spacewarn System and the International Ursi-gramme and World Day Service.
- Foreign Fellow of Bangladesh Academy of Sciences
- Awarded the Padma Bhushan in 1987
- Fellow of the Royal Society of London in 1988.
- President of the International Union of Radio Sciences - URSI between 1984 and 1987
- Member, General Committee of International Council of Scientific Unions between 1984 and 1988
- Fellow - Indian National Science Academy in 1961
- Fellow of the Indian Academy Sciences in 1974
- Fellow of the Thud World Academy of Sciences in 198
- President, National Academy of Sciences between 1992 and 1993
- Honorary President, URSI in 2002
- Jawahar La1 Nehru Fellowship between 1978 and 1980
- Shanti Swarup Bhatnagar Fellowship between 1991 and 1996
- Senior Homi Bhabha Fellowship between 1996 and 1998
- Shanti Swarup Bhatnagar Memorial Award for Physical Sciences in 1968
- C. V. Raman Award of University Grants Commission in 1982
- Om Prakash Bhasin Award for Physical Physical Sciences in 1987
- FICCI Award for Physical Sciences in 1982
- Meghnad Saha Golden Jubilee Award of Indian Association of Science in 1991
- Modi Science Award in 1992
- Vasuic Award on Environmental Science and Technology in 2002
- Meghnad Saha Medal by Asiatic Society in 1994
- S. K. Mitra Centenary Medal by Indian Science Congress Association in 1995
- DSc (Honors Causa) degrees from the universities of Manipur, Kolkata, Jadavpur, Burdwan North Bangal, Vidhyasagar.

== Personal life ==
Ashesh Prosad Mitra had two daughters with his wife, Sunanda, whom he married on 12 August 1956.
