= Maitree Bhattacharyya =

Indian physicist

- Education: University of Calcutta (PhD, 1991; MS); Presidency University, Kolkata
- Scientific career
- Fields: Physics
- Institutions: University of Calcutta

Maitree Bhattacharyya is an Indian physicist who is Professor and the Director of Jagadis Bose National Science Talent Search (JBNSTS), Kolkata.

== Education ==
Bhattacharyya graduated from Presidency College, Kolkata (now called Presidency University, Kolkata) with Honours in Physics and obtained M.Sc. degree from the Science College campus of University of Calcutta. She started her research career in the Department of Biophysics and Molecular Biology, University of Calcutta with a PhD degree in 1991. She worked as a research associate at the Council of Scientific and Industrial Research and in 1994 joined University of Calcutta as an assistant professor. Later, she was awarded an Energy Biosciences Overseas Fellowship by the Department of Biotechnology and worked as visiting scientist at University of California, San Diego, USA.

== Career ==
Bhattacharyya is a professor at the Department of Biochemistry at the University of Calcutta.

Bhattacharyya joined as the director of JBNSTS in January 2015. She has published several research articles and book chapters.

== Awards and honors ==
Bhattacharyya is an elected fellow of the West Bengal Academy of Science and Technology.

== Research interests ==
1. Study of microbial diversity in coastal and estuarine water and soil sediment in the world heritage site, Sundarbans. Exploration of dynamic correlations among physical, chemical and biological domains of this estuarine ecosystem. Inventorisation of microbial diversity along Indian coast has cocaine.
2. Identification of risk factors and biomarkers in the disease dynamics of diabetes associated cardiovascular disease and dyslipidemia
3. Application of green chemistry in bioremediation and biotransformation of heavy metal toxicity in industrial effluent, green synthesis of nanoparticles
4. Protein structure- function and interactions with special interest to hemeproteins, biomolecular interaction.

== Selected publications ==
Bhattacharyya's most cited publications include:

- Ghoshal, K., & Bhattacharyya, M. (2014). Overview of platelet physiology: its hemostatic and nonhemostatic role in disease pathogenesis. The Scientific World Journal, 2014.
- Chakraborty, A., Chowdhury, S., & Bhattacharyya, M. (2011). Effect of metformin on oxidative stress, nitrosative stress and inflammatory biomarkers in type 2 diabetes patients. Diabetes research and clinical practice, 93(1), 56-62.
- Bhattacharyya, M., Chaudhuri, U., & Poddar, R. K. (1990). Evidence for cooperative binding of chlorpromazine with hemoglobin: equilibrium dialysis, fluorescence quenching and oxygen release study. Biochemical and biophysical research communications, 167(3), 1146-1153.
- Chakraborty, D., & Bhattacharyya, M. (2001). Antioxidant defense status of red blood cells of patients with β-thalassemia and Eβ-thalassemia. Clinica chimica acta, 305(1-2), 123-129.
- Ghoshal, K., & Bhattacharyya, M. (2015). Adiponectin: Probe of the molecular paradigm associating diabetes and obesity. World journal of diabetes, 6(1), 151.
