= Eden Hindu Hostel =

Hostel in Kolkata, India

Eden Hindu Hostel (Bengali: ইডেন হিন্দু হোস্টেল), established in 1886, was primarily built for Hindu students of Presidency University, Kolkata, India. The hostel is now open for students of all religions. It is now meant for students who come from outside Calcutta to study in the Presidency University, Kolkata. The hostel is located next to Darbhanga Building inside Ashutosh Sikhsha Prangan of the University of Calcutta and stands on Peary Charan Sarkar Street, which separates Presidency University from the premises of the main campus of the University of Calcutta. As of 13 November 2014, this hostel has the capacity to accommodate 275 boarders.

Government Eden Hindu Hostel, Kolkata. (October 2014)

== Buildings and rooms ==
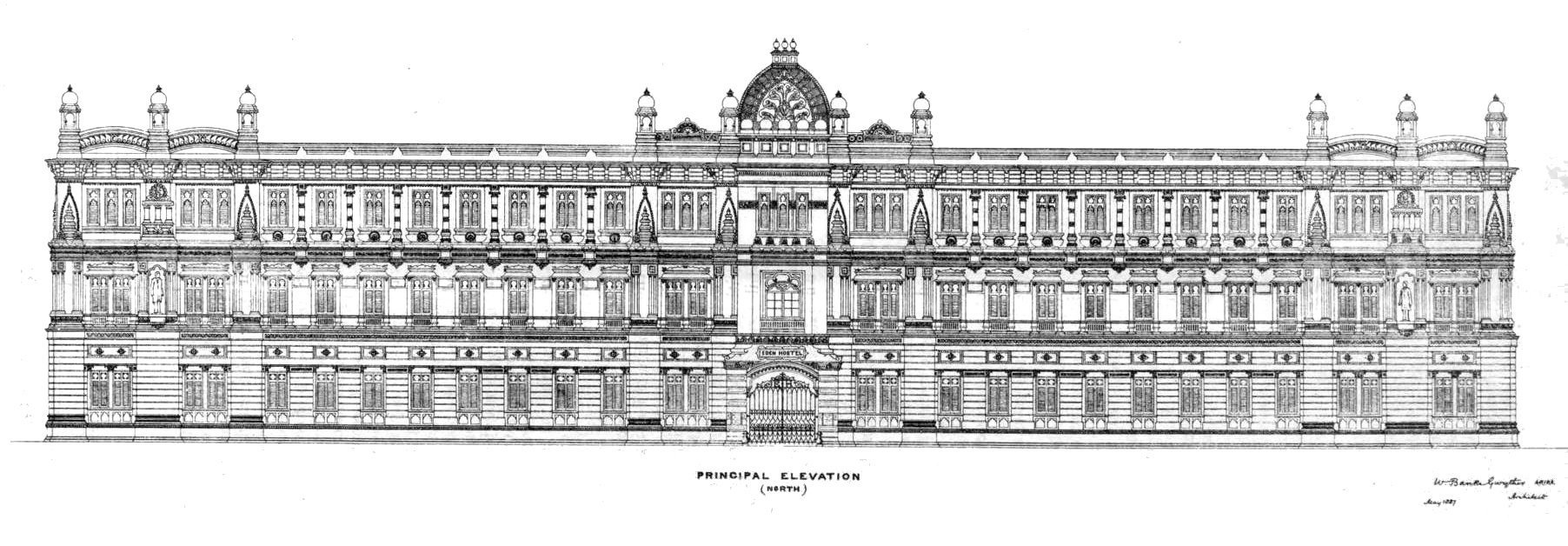
Architectural plan of the front

The building was built out of funds raised by Ashley Eden and the architect was W.B. Gwyther and the contractor was Rai Khetter Chunder Bannerjee.

== Activities ==
All the boarders actively participate in sports tournaments like football, volleyball, cricket, etc. They also take part in various cultural activities like Saraswati Puja, Re-union, Freshers’ Welcome and outgoing boarders’ farewell, Ward tour and other cultural programmes.

== Notable alumni ==
- Meghnad Saha
- Rajendra Prasad
- Satyabrata Mookherjee
