= Rahul Banerjee (chemist) =

Indian chemist

- Born: 22 March 1978 (age 48); West Bengal, India
- Education: Rajabazar Science College; University of Calcutta; University of Hyderabad
- Known for: Covalent Organic framework
- Awards: 2011 NASI-Young Scientist Platinum Jubilee Award; 2011 CSIR Young Scientist Award; 2014 NASI-SCOPUS Young Scientist Award; 2015 Thomson Reuters Research Excellence-India Citation Award; 2018 Shanti Swarup Bhatnagar Prize
- Scientific career
- Fields: Organic chemistry
- Workplaces: National Chemical Laboratory; Indian Institute of Science Education and Research, Kolkata
- Doctoral advisor: Gautam Radhakrishna Desiraju; Omar M. Yaghi

Rahul Banerjee (born 1978) is a Bengali Indian organic chemist and a professor at the department of chemical sciences of the Indian Institute of Science Education and Research, Kolkata. Banerjee, a fellow of the Royal Society of Chemistry, was known for his studies in the field of Metal–organic framework designing. The Council of Scientific and Industrial Research, the apex agency of the Government of India for scientific research, awarded him the Shanti Swarup Bhatnagar Prize for Science and Technology, one of the highest Indian science awards, for his contributions to chemical sciences in 2018. (Note: Long link - please select award year to see details) Currently he is one of the associate editor of international peer-review journal Journal of the American Chemical Society.

== Biography ==
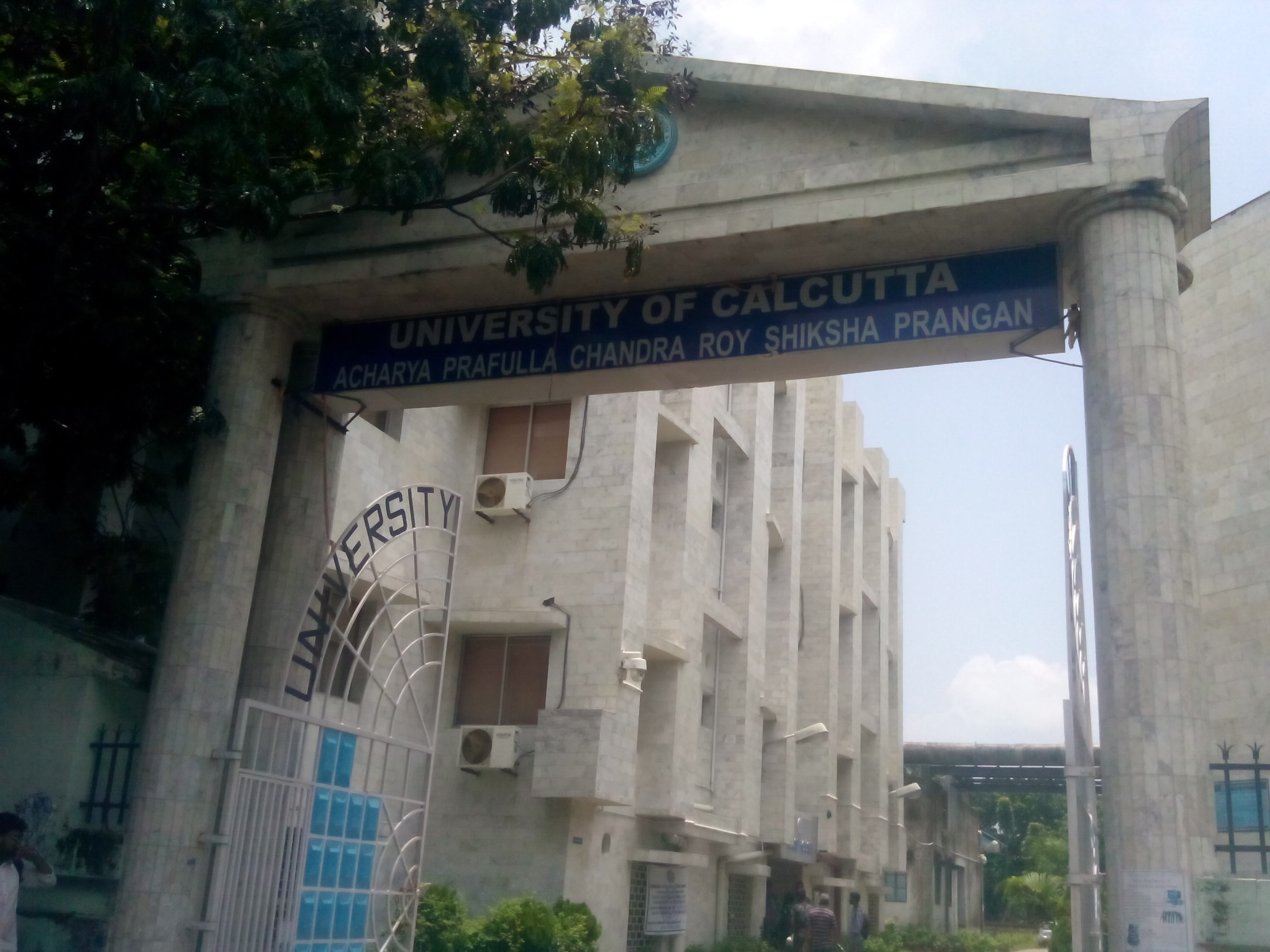
Calcutta university - Salt Lake campus

Rahul Banerjee, born on 22 March 1978 in the Indian state of West Bengal, graduated in chemistry with honors from the University of Calcutta in 1998 and continued at the institution to earn a master's degree from the prestigious Rajabazar Science College campus in 2000. His doctoral studies were at the University of Hyderabad under the guidance of TWAS laureate, Gautam Radhakrishna Desiraju, and he received his PhD in crystal engineering and supramolecular chemistry in the year 2006. Subsequently, he moved to the US to do his post-doctoral work at the laboratory of Omar M. Yaghi at the University of California, Los Angeles and on his return to India in 2008, he joined the National Chemical Laboratory, Pune (NCL) as a scientist at grade C. At the time his next move to the Indian Institute of Science Education and Research, Kolkata (IISER) in 2017, he was an E-1 grade scientist at NCL. At IISER, he holds the position of an associate professor and heads the Porous Materials Laboratory (PMATLAB) where he hosts a number of researchers.

== Research and contributions ==
Banerjee focuses his research on designing Metal–organic frameworks for improved gas uptake property and is known to have contributed to the field of structural chemistry with regard to applications in hydrogen storage and carbon capture. He has also worked extensively on the design and applications of covalent-organic frameworks in recent years. He has published a number of articles. (Note: Please see Selected bibliography section) ResearchGate, an online repository of scientific articles has listed 165 of them. He has participated in several scientific events including the Royal Society of Chemistry Roadshow 2017 held at the National Chemical Laboratory, Pune where he was one of the keynote speakers. He is also an associate editor of CrystEngComm, the biweekly journal of the Royal Society of Chemistry.

== Awards and honors ==
During his days at the University of California, Los Angeles, in 2008, Banerjee received two honors, viz. the Post Doctoral Recognition Award and the Amgen Post Doctoral Award, both awarded by the Department of Chemistry and Biochemistry of the university. The Indian Academy of Sciences selected him as a Young Associate in 2009 and he received two Young Scientist awards in 2011, the NASI-Young Scientist Platinum Jubilee Award and the CSIR Young Scientist Award. Banerjee, who has received the fellowship of the Royal Society of Chemistry, was honored again by the National Academy of Sciences, India and Elsevier in 2014 with the NASI-SCOPUS Young Scientist Award and a year later, he received the Thomson Reuters Research Excellence-India Citation Award. The same year, he received the 2015 B. M. Birla Science Prize in Chemistry and he was selected for the Swarnajayanti Fellowship of the Department of Science and Technology in 2016. The Council of Scientific and Industrial Research awarded him the Shanti Swarup Bhatnagar Prize, one of the highest Indian science awards in 2018.

== Selected bibliography ==
- Halder, Arjun; Ghosh, Meena; Khayum M, Abdul; Bera, Saibal; Addicoat, Matthew; Sasmal, Himadri Sekhar; Karak, Suvendu; Kurungot, Sreekumar; Banerjee, Rahul (5 September 2018). "Interlayer Hydrogen-Bonded Covalent Organic Frameworks as High-Performance Supercapacitors" (PDF). Journal of the American Chemical Society. 140 (35): 10941–10945. Bibcode:2018JAChS.14010941H. doi:10.1021/jacs.8b06460. ISSN 0002-7863. PMID 30132332. S2CID 207193051.
- Dey, Kaushik; Pal, Manas; Rout, Kanhu Charan; Kunjattu H, Shebeeb; Das, Anuja; Mukherjee, Rabibrata; Kharul, Ulhas K.; Banerjee, Rahul (20 September 2017). "Selective Molecular Separation by Interfacially Crystallized Covalent Organic Framework Thin Films". Journal of the American Chemical Society. 139 (37): 13083–13091. Bibcode:2017JAChS.13913083D. doi:10.1021/jacs.7b06640. ISSN 0002-7863. PMID 28876060.
- Khayum, M. Abdul; Kandambeth, Sharath; Mitra, Shouvik; Nair, Sanoop B.; Das, Anuja; Nagane, Samadhan S.; Mukherjee, Rabibrata; Banerjee, Rahul (2016). "Chemically Delaminated Free-Standing Ultrathin Covalent Organic Nanosheets". Angewandte Chemie. 128 (50): 15833–15837. Bibcode:2016AngCh.12815833K. doi:10.1002/ange.201607812. ISSN 1521-3757. PMID 27862737.
- Banerjee, Rahul; Kharul, Ulhas K.; Garai, Bikash; Karak, Suvendu; Bera, Saibal; Shinde, Digambar Balaji; Chandra, Suman; Kandambeth, Sharath; Biswal, Bishnu P. (24 November 2015). "Pore surface engineering in porous, chemically stable covalent organic frameworks for water adsorption". Journal of Materials Chemistry A. 3 (47): 23664–23669. doi:10.1039/C5TA07998E. ISSN 2050-7496.
- Bajpai, Alankriti; Chandrasekhar, Pujari; Govardhan, Savitha; Banerjee, Rahul; Moorthy, Jarugu Narasimha (2015). "Single Crystal-to-Single Crystal Site-Selective Postsynthetic Metal Exchange in a Zn–MOF Based on Semi-Rigid Tricarboxylic Acid and Access to Bimetallic MOFs". Chemistry – A European Journal. 21 (7): 2759–2765. doi:10.1002/chem.201406098. ISSN 1521-3765. PMID 25533890.

== See also ==
- Covalent organic framework
- Determining hydrogen storage capacity
