= Sushmita Mitra =

Indian computer scientist

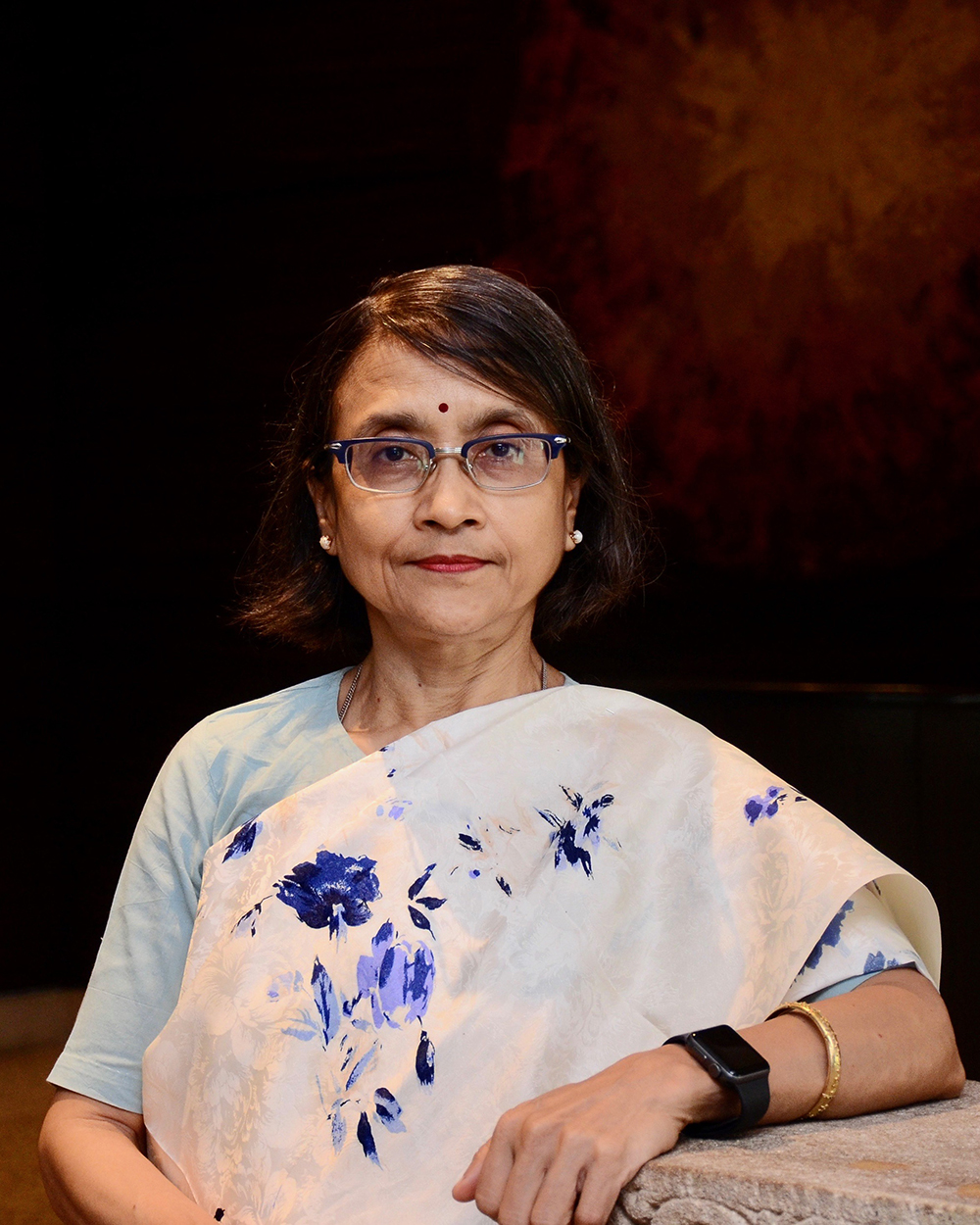
- Mitra, c. 2022
- Born: Kolkata
- Citizenship: India
- Education: University of Calcutta; Indian Statistical Institute
- Family: Late Dr. Maya Mitra {d. 2006} & Late Dr. Girindra Nath Mitra {d. 1983} (parents); Somosmita Mitra (daughter)
- Awards: J. C. Bose National Fellow & Fellow of IEEE, INSA, IAPR, AAAI, IASc, INAE, NASI
- Scientific career
- Fields: Computer Science, Artificial Intelligence, Healthcare applications, Data Science
- Workplaces: Indian Statistical Institute
- Thesis: (1995)

Sushmita Mitra is an Indian female computer scientist. She is currently a Full Professor (HAG) and a former head of the Machine Intelligence Unit at Indian Statistical Institute, Kolkata. Her research interests include data science, machine learning, bioinformatics, soft computing and medical imaging. She got recognised as a fellow of IEEE for her neuro-fuzzy and hybrid approaches in pattern recognition. She is a Fellow of all three science academies and the engineering academy of India, along with several others from abroad.

== Life and career ==
=== The journey ===
Sushmita was born to Dr. Maya Mitra, a professor of Botany at Bethune College in Kolkata, and Dr. Girindra Nath Mitra, a scientist with Indian Council of Agricultural Research (ICAR). Her mother did her PhD in Botany, receiving the Agarkar Gold Medal, from the University of Calcutta (1960). In those days a woman completing Ph.D. was indeed a rarity. Sushmita's parents had the privilege of publishing research articles in ``Nature". They inspired her to achieve; whatever she is today, she owes it to their immense love and sacrifice for her.

Sushmita did her ISC from Calcutta Girls’ High School and her ICSE from Auxilium Convent School. In her high school, she was also awarded National Talent Search Scholarship by National Council for Educational Research and Training (NCERT) which continued till her master's-level education (1978–1983). Then she studied physics honours in Presidency College, under the guidance of Prof. Amal Raychaudhuri and Prof. Shyamal Sengupta. Subsequently, she secured an admission to B.Tech in Computer Science of Rajabazar Science College, University of Calcutta and also cleared the entrance test for Integrated five-year M.E. course of Indian Institute of Science which she did not join. Instead, she met the renowned Prof. Arun Choudhury who taught her the basics of electrical circuits.

After she ranked first in her undergraduate class, she gained admission to M.Tech. at IIT Kharagpur. However, she came back to Kolkata and pursued her M.Tech at the Science college campus of University of Calcutta, where she ranked first and was awarded the University Gold Medal for her performance. After her M.Tech., she took up a project assistantship at Indian Statistical Institute on the topic of pattern recognition under Dr. Sankar K. Pal. She received the CSIR Senior Research Fellowship to work on her Ph.D. in Neuro-Fuzzy Pattern Recognition under the supervision of Prof. Sankar K. Pal in 1989. In 1992, she was selected for the DAAD fellowship to work with Prof. H. -J. Zimmermann in RWTH Aachen University in Germany from 1992-1994. She completed her Ph.D. in computer science from ISI in 1995. She started working there in 1991 and has risen up the academic ladder to the level of a full professor (HAG).

Simultaneously she has been a single parent to Somosmita, who is now doing her PhD in Purdue University. Her current pursuits include Meditation and Kriya Yoga school.

=== Career and research ===
Dr. Mitra received the IEEE Neural Networks Council Outstanding Paper Award in 1994 and the CIMPA-INRIA-UNESCO Fellowship in 1996 for her pioneering work on neuro fuzzy computing and its generic hybridization with other soft computing paradigms. On recommendation of one of her Ph.D. examiners, she authored a book based on her publication - Neuro Fuzzy Pattern Recognition: Methods in Soft Computing. published by John Wiley. Her research also resulted in several fellowships - which includes those of IEEE, Indian National Science Academy (INSA), International Association for Pattern Recognition (IAPR), Indian Academy of Sciences (IASc), Indian National Academy of Engineering (INAE), Asia-Pacific Artificial Intelligence Association (AAIA), and The National Academy of Sciences, India (NASI). She is also a recipient of prestigious J. C. Bose National Fellowship in 2021 and is a member of the Inter-Academy Panel for Women in STEMM. She has authored several other books, including Data Mining: Multimedia, Soft Computing, and Bioinformatics; and Introduction to Machine Learning and Bioinformatics.

Mitra was a visiting professor in the Computer Science Departments of University of Alberta, Edmonton, Canada in 2004 and 2007. She also visited Meiji University, Japan in 1999, 2004, 2005, and 2007; and Aalborg University, Esbjerg, Denmark in 2002 and 2003. She has also been associated with the editorial activity of several international journals, and has chaired many international conferences. Dr. Mitra has guest edited special issues of several journals; is an Associate Editor of “IEEE/ACM Trans. on Computational Biology and Bioinformatics”, “Information Sciences”, Proceedings of the Indian National Science Academy, Computers in Biology and Medicine, and is a Founding Associate Editor of “Wiley Interdisciplinary Reviews: Data Mining and Knowledge Discovery (WIRE DMKD)”.

Two of her research papers have been ranked 3rd and 15th in the list of top-cited papers in Engineering Science from India during 1992-2001, according to the Science Citation Index (SCI). There are more than 150 research publications in her name in refereed international journals. For the period 2014-2016, 2018-2021, Dr. Mitra was an IEEE CIS Distinguished Lecturer. She was a Fulbright-Nehru Academic and Professional Excellence (FNAPE) Fellow in 2018-2020, and INAE Chair Professor during 2018-2020. She was the Chair, IEEE Kolkata Section (2021-22), and also of the IEEE CIS Kolkata Chapter. She has visited more than 30 countries as a Plenary/Invited Speaker or an academic visitor. She served in the capacity of General Chair, Program Chair, Tutorial Chair, of many international conferences.

== Cited in ==
- A Bangla clip from Sananda, August 15, 2000
- "How I Became What I Am" in Lilavati's Daughters: The Women Scientists of India, R. Godbole and R. Ramaswamy (Eds.), Indian Academy of Sciences, Bangalore, pp. 196–197, 2008. (ISBN 978-81-8465-005-1)
- "Reminisces from the Past" in The Mind of an Engineer (2016)
- Television interview from University of San Pablo, Peru (2019)
- UNESCO: A Braided River: The Universe of Indian Women in Science (2022)
- TCS: Real Leaders, Real Stories (2022)
- Women Engineers in India, Vol. I (2022)
- IAPR (International Association for Pattern Recognition) Interview (2023)
- INSA: Women Shaping Scientific Frontiers (2024)
- Bigyan Bishwe Banglar Meyera (2025)
- "Life is a Journey" (2025)
- IEEE Computational Intelligence Society Distinguished Lecturer 2025-2027
