= Jnan Chandra Ghosh =

Indian chemist (1894–1959)

Jnan Chandra Ghosh D.Sc., F.N.I.
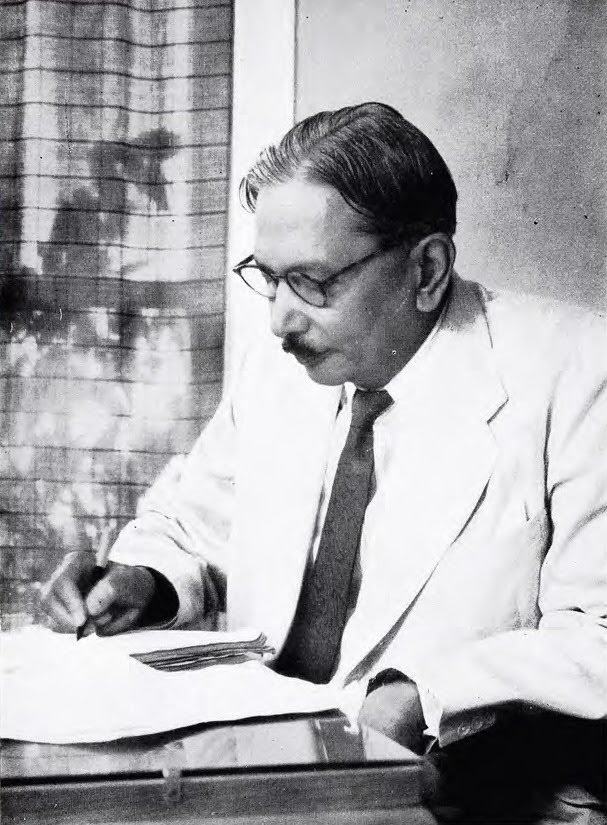
- Jnan Chandra Ghosh
- Born: 4 September 1894; Giridih, Chota Nagpur Division, British India
- Died: 21 January 1959 (aged 64); Calcutta, India
- Other names: Sir J. C. Ghosh; Jnanendra Chandra Ghosh
- Education: Rajabazar Science College (University of Calcutta)
- Known for: Anomaly of strong electrolytes
- Awards: Padma Bhushan
- Scientific career
- Fields: Chemistry
- Workplaces: Dhaka University; Indian Institute of Science; Indian Institute of Technology, Kharagpur; University of Calcutta
- Academic advisors: Prafulla Chandra Ray

Sir Jnan Chandra Ghosh or Jnanendra Chandra Ghosh (4 September 1894 – 21 January 1959) was an Indian chemist best known for his contribution to the development of scientific research, industrial development and technology education in India. He served as the director of the newly formed Eastern Higher Technical Institute in 1950, which was renamed as IIT Kharagpur in 1951. He was also the director of the Indian Institute of Science Bangalore and Vice Chancellor of the University of Calcutta.

He was also known for his resolution of the anomaly of strong electrolytes and the dissociation - ionization theory.

Ghosh's other important contributions include his extensive study of photocatalysts under the influence of polarised light and developments of Fischer–Tropsch reaction for the synthesis of hydrocarbons. Dr. Ghosh made contributions in the field of the application of Differential Thermal Analysis (D.T.A) as a tool for the systematic study of solid catalysts.

He also successfully guided research work on technical problems relating to the production from Indian raw materials of phosphatic fertilisers, ammonium sulphate, formaldehyde, potassium chlorate, etc. During his active career in building scientific research, technical education and industrial development, he was the Head of the Department of Chemistry at Dacca University, the Director of the Indian Institute of Science at Bangalore, the Director of the Indian Institute of Technology, Kharagpur, the Vice Chancellor of Calcutta University, and the Director-general of Industries and Supplies, Government of India.

Jnan Chandra Ghosh polytechnic, a government technical education institute providing diploma in engineering is named after him, located at Mominpur area of Kolkata.

== Biography ==
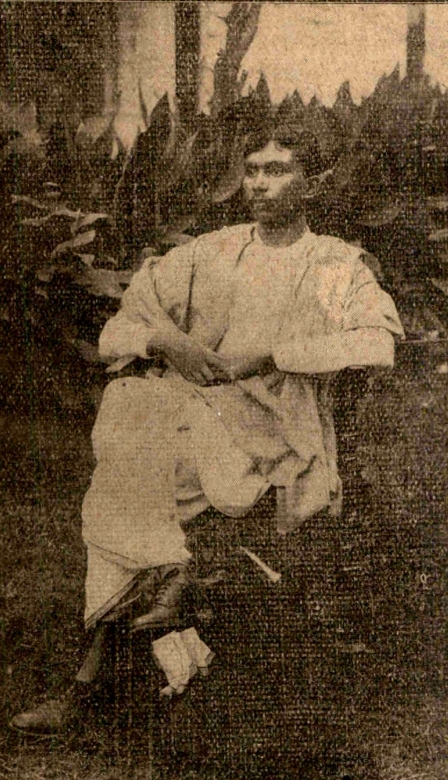
c. 1919

Jnan Chandra Ghosh was born in a Bengali Kayastha family in Giridih, Jharkhand, British India. The son of Ram Chandra Ghosh, J C Ghosh belonged to a family of mica mine owners and mica merchants. He had his initial schooling at Giridih High School, where he stood first in the Chotnagpur Division in 1909 and enrolled in Presidency College, Kolkata. At Presidency College, he was among the finest students who would later become famous scientists.

In 1911, Jnan Chandra got fourth position in I.Sc. examination, while his other famous classmates Satyendranath Bose topped the list and Meghnad Saha got the third position. He passed both B.Sc. and M.Sc. as first in the first class in Chemistry and during this time he came under inspiring influence of Acharya Prafulla Chandra Ray. The Vice-Chancellor of Calcutta University, Sir Ashutosh Mukherjee invited Jnan Ghosh to join as a lecturer even before the results were published. After his M.Sc. he was appointed as a lecturer of the Chemistry Department of newly founded Rajabazar Science College, Calcutta.

The Sir Tarak Nath Palit Scholarship and Premchand Raychand student of the year award enabled J C Ghosh to travel to England for his doctoral degree at University College of Science in London. In London, he took up research on various problems of photochemistry and he led to the exposition of theory of anomaly of strong electrolytes and the ionization theory. His scientific research drew appreciation from many famous scientists such as Max Planck, William Bragg and Walther Nernst.

In 1918, he was awarded D.Sc. for his research on strong electrolytes. During his stay in London, he worked for some time under Frederick G. Donnan.

== Career ==
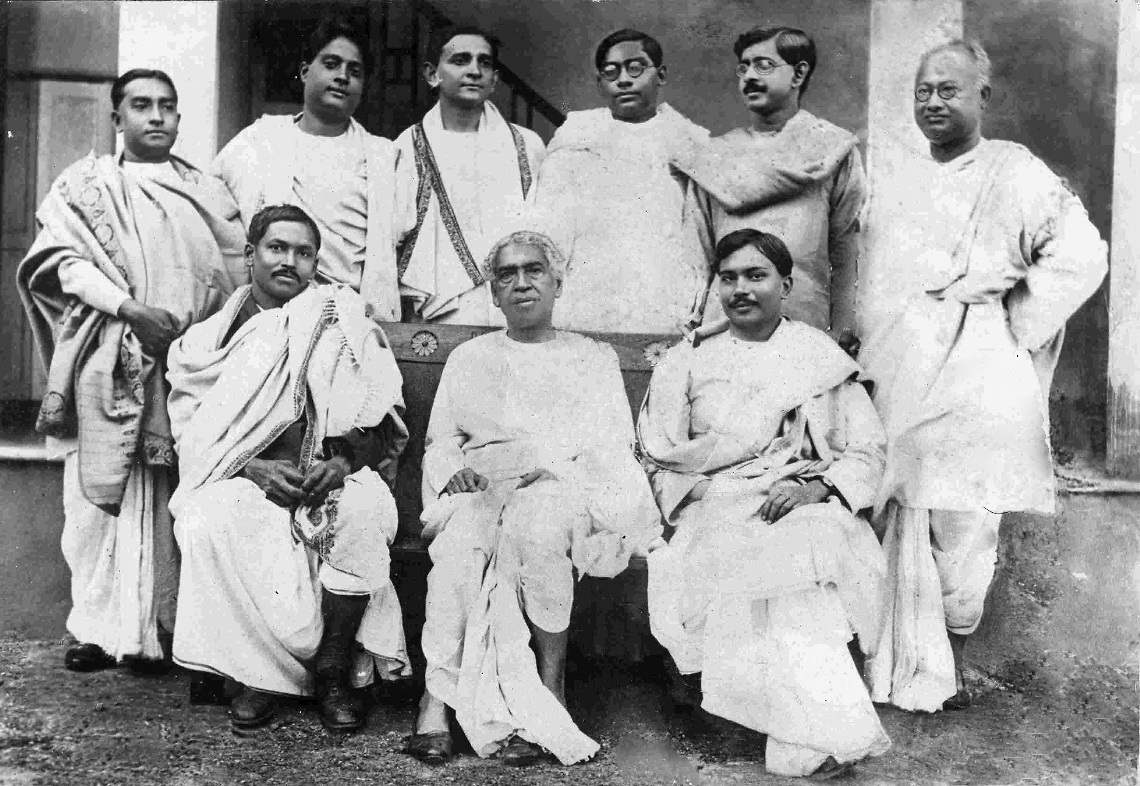
Jnan Chnadra Ghosh with other scientists at Calcutta University

In 1921, J C Ghosh returned to India and joined the newly established Dacca University as professor and Head of the Department of Chemistry. He served Dacca University for about twenty years, with successes in research and in building a school of Physical Chemistry. The most intensive research was carried out in the field of photo-chemistry, bio-chemistry and agricultural chemistry. He also served as dean of the Faculty of Sciences in 1924 and Provost of the Dacca University Hall from 1925 until the end of his stay.

In 1939, he was summoned to succeed C V Raman as the Director of the Indian Institute of Science at Bangalore. At IISc too, J C Ghosh developed the institute rapidly by introducing engineering studies such as Aeronautical Engineering, Internal Combustion Engineering, Metallurgy and Power and High Voltage Engineering. During his service at IISC, he was knighted in 1943, chiefly for his war services.

He pioneered research on the Fischer-Tropsch synthesis for obtaining liquid fuel from carbon monoxide and hydrogen and step-wise mechanism of ammonia synthesis from its elements, nitrogen and hydrogen. The findings were published in a book titled Some Catalytic Gas Reactions of Industrial Importance.

Inspired by his mentor Acharya Prafulla Chandra Ray, J C Ghosh was committed to development of industries in India. Towards that goal, he led research work on technical problems relating to the production from Indian raw materials of phosphatic fertilisers, ammonium sulphate, formaldehyde, and potassium chlorate. He transitioned to the role of Director-General of Industry and Supply (1947-1950) and collaborated with international experts that laid the basis of heavy industries of steel, petroleum, machine tools and radar industries. During this period, he also served as a member of the All India Council of Technical Education and there he felt the inadequacy of quality trained persons for large-scale industrial development. The need for technical education led to the establishment of a technology institute and J C Ghosh became the first Director of the Indian Institute of Technology, Kharagpur. J C Ghosh built a strong foundation with a cosmopolitan environment and brought the right people from across India and all over the world. He believed in close interaction between teachers, students and administration.

At his highest intense involvement at IIT, Kharagpur, he was called upon to lead his alma mater, Calcutta University. At the news of his departure, the students at IIT, Kharagpur went on a mass strike. Sir J C Ghosh addressed the students on the lawns of the students' residence, Patel Hall, and broke down in the middle of his speech and cried. In 1954, he left for Calcutta to become Vice Chancellor, Calcutta University where he started focusing on the improvements of living conditions of the students. In 1954, the Government of India awarded Padma Bhushan on him in recognition of his ability and service to the country. After a year, he was inducted into the Planning Commission and was placed in charge of Education, Scientific Research and Health. Since May 1955, Dr. Ghosh had served with great distinction as a Member of the Planning Commission. He took part in all the stages of the preparation of the Second Five Year Plan and had a large share in working out proposals for the expansion of facilities for technical education at various levels. He died in harness on 21 January 1959.
