= Phoolan Prasad =

Indian mathematician (born 1944)

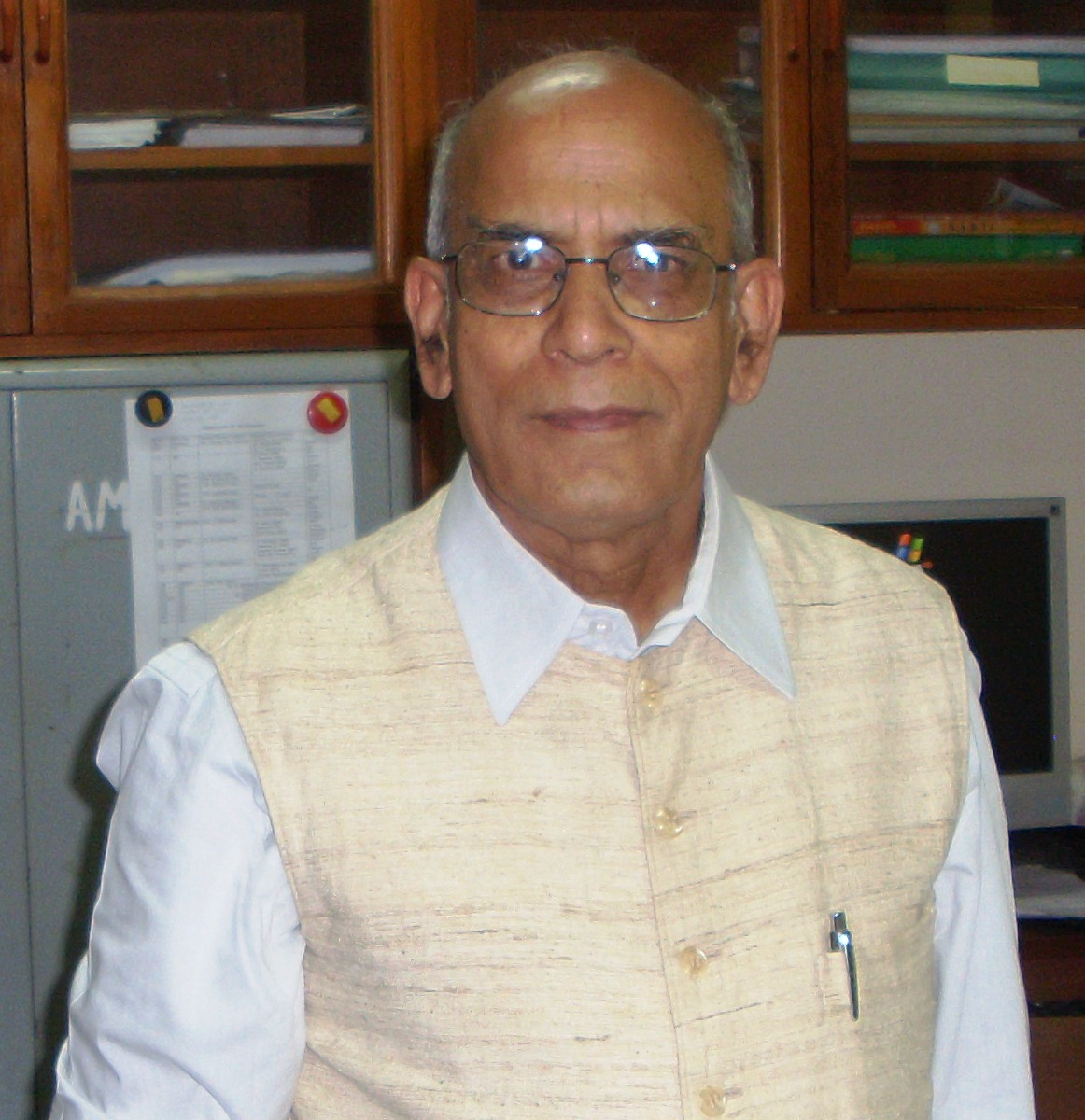
- Born: 1 January 1944 (age 82); Khejuri, Ballia, UP, India
- Awards: Shanti Swarup Bhatnagar Prize for Science and Technology
- Scientific career
- Fields: Partial differential equations, fluid mechanics
- Workplaces: Indian Institute of Science, Bangalore, India

Phoolan Prasad (born 1 January 1944) is an Indian mathematician who specialised in Partial differential equations, fluid mechanics. He was awarded in 1983 the Shanti Swarup Bhatnagar Prize for Science and Technology, the highest science award in India, in the mathematical sciences category. He is Fellow of all Indian Science Academies: The National Academy of Sciences, India (NASI), Indian Academy of Sciences (IAS) and Indian National Science Academy (INSA).

== Early life and education ==
Phoolan Prasad was born in a village Khejuri, District Ballia, UP and educated up to class 8 there.

Then he studied in Nalhati HP High School, Krishnath College Berhampore, received his B.Sc. from the Presidency College, Calcutta University and M.Sc. from Rajabazar Science College campus of Calcutta University followed by a Ph.D. from Indian Institute of Science (IISc), Bangalore in 1968.

== Career ==
Prasad started his career as a lecturer in the Department of Applied Mathematics in 1967 at Indian Institute of Science, thereafter he became a professor in 1977. Meanwhile, he also remained a Postdoctoral Fellow at Leeds University (1970–72) and Alexander von Humboldt Fellow (1980–81). He was at the St John's College, Cambridge with privileges of a Fellow of the College. At IISc, he held Distinguished chair of MSIL Professorship during 1993–96, was Chairman of the Department of Mathematics during 1996–2000, was Professor in super-time-scale before his retirement on 31 July 2006, was Honorary Professor during 2006–2011, was DAE Raja Ramanna Fellow also during 2006–2011, was INSA Senior Scientist in 2011, was NASI-Senior Scientist Platinum Jubilee Fellow during 2012 -2016

Prasad has done some significant work in the area on non-linear hyperbolic equations. He succeeded in assessing the basic properties of the equations of various physical phenomena, generalized these mathematical properties and then used his theory to explain new results in the field of non-linear waves. He gave a proof of the existence of a new type of wave on the interface of a clear liquid and a mixture in a sedimentation process.

== Books ==
- Phoolan Prasad; Renuka Ravindran. Partial Differential Equations. Wiley Eastern Ltd., 1984, International Edition by John Wiley Sons, New York, 1984 available at http://www.math.iisc.ac.in/~prasad/prasad/book/PP-RR_PDE_book_1984.pdf
- Phoolan Prasad (1992). A Mathematical Theory of Shock Propagation. Longman Scientific & Technical.
- Phoolan Prasad (1993). Propagation of a curved shock and nonlinear ray theory. Longman Scientific & Technical. ISBN 978-0-582-07253-4.
- Phoolan Prasad (1994). A Nonlinear Ray Theory. Univ. Kaiserslautern, Fachbereich Math.
- Phoolan Prasad (2010). Nonlinear Hyperbolic Waves in Multidimensions. Taylor & Francis. ISBN 978-1-58488-072-1.
- Phoolan Prasad (2018) Propagation of Multi-Dimensional Nonlinear Waves and Kinematical Conservation Laws, Springer, Springer Nature Singapore, DOI 10.1007/s12044-016-0275-6.

== Biography, education and research ==
- Biographical sketch
- Struggle and Success in Education of a Student
- Joy and Satisfaction in My Research
