= Saha Institute of Nuclear Physics =

Research institute in Bidhannagar, Kolkata, India

- Motto: Advancement of Knowledge
- Founder: Meghnad Saha
- Established: 11 January 1950; 76 years ago
- Focus: Applied Nuclear Physics; Nuclear astrophysics; Biophysics; Structural genomics; Chemical Sciences; Crystallography; Molecular biology; Condensed matter physics; High-energy nuclear physics; Particle physics; Plasma Physics; Surface Physics; Material science; Theoretical physics
- Chair: Secretary of DAE
- Director: Amit Ghosh
- Subsidiaries: Department of Atomic Energy
- Location: Kolkata, West Bengal, India
- Coordinates: 22°36′06″N 88°25′03″E
- Interactive map of Saha Institute of Nuclear Physics
- Website: www.saha.ac.in

The Saha Institute of Nuclear Physics (SINP) is an institution of basic research and training in physical and biophysical sciences located in Bidhannagar, Kolkata, India. The institute is named after and founded by the famous Indian physicist Meghnad Saha.

== Previous Directors ==
- Gautam Bhattacharyya
- Ajit Kumar Mohanty
- Bikas Chakrabarti
- Milan K. Sanyal [2009 to 2014]
- Bikash Sinha
- Manoj K. Pal
- D. N. Kundu
- B. D. Nag Chowdhury
- Meghnad Saha

== See also ==
- Education in India
- List of colleges in West Bengal
- Education in West Bengal
