= Usha Ranjan Ghatak =

Indian synthetic organic chemist and stereochemist

- Born: 26 February 1931; Brahmanbaria, Bengal Presidency, British India
- Died: 18 June 2005 (aged 74); Kolkata, West Bengal, India
- Education: Asutosh College (B.Sc.); Rajabazar Science College (M.Sc.) & (Ph.D.); University of Calcutta; University of Maine; University of California, Berkeley; St. John's University (Post Doc.)
- Known for: Studies on stereochemically controlled organic synthesis
- Awards: 1974 Shanti Swarup Bhatnagar Prize; 2003 CRSI Lifetime Achievement Award
- Scientific career
- Fields: Synthetic organic chemistry; Stereochemistry
- Workplaces: Indian Association for the Cultivation of Science; Indian Institute of Chemical Biology
- Doctoral advisor: P. C. Dutta

Usha Ranjan Ghatak (26 February 1931 – 18 June 2005) was an Indian synthetic organic chemist, stereochemist and the director of the Indian Association for the Cultivation of Science (IACS). He was known for his contributions in developing novel protocols of stereoselective synthesis of diterpenoids. He was an elected fellow of the Indian Academy of Sciences and the Indian National Science Academy. The Council of Scientific and Industrial Research, the apex agency of the Government of India for scientific research, awarded him the Shanti Swarup Bhatnagar Prize for Science and Technology, one of the highest Indian science awards, in 1974, for his contributions to chemical sciences.

== Biography ==
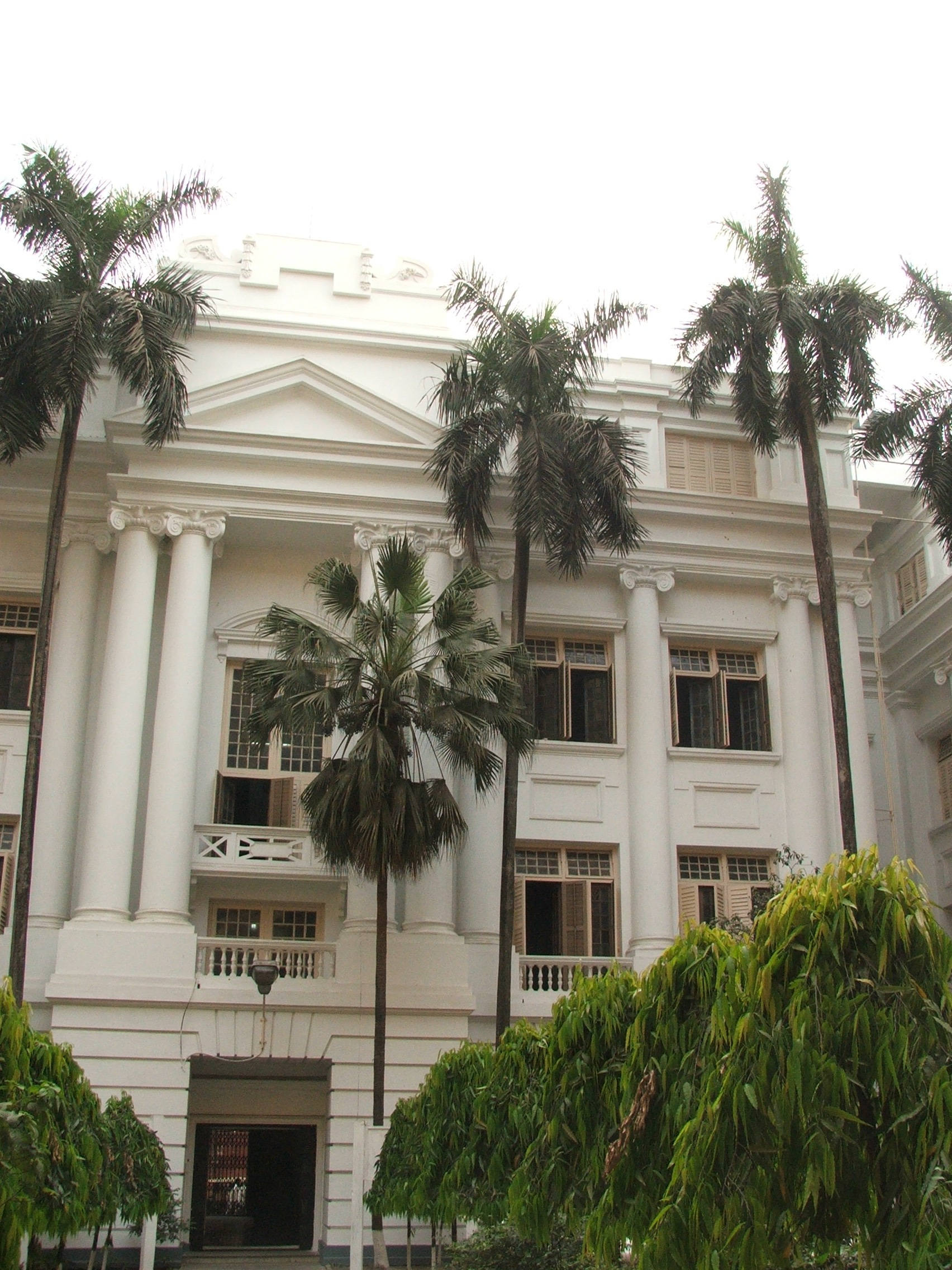
Calcutta University

U. R. Ghatak was born on 26 February 1931 at Brahmanbaria, a town of historic importance in the undivided Bengal of British India (presently in Bangladesh) to Hem Ranjan Ghatak-Soudamini Devi couple as one among their seven children. He did his schooling locally and after passing matriculation examination in 1947, he completed his intermediate studies in Agartala in 1949. His graduate studies (BSc hons) were at Asutosh College in chemistry and secured his master's degree from Rajabazar Science College in 1953, winning Motilal Mullick Medal and University Gold Medal for standing first in the examination. Subsequently, he enrolled for doctoral studies at Indian Association for the Cultivation of Science (IACS) and studied under the guidance of P. C. Dutta, a synthetic organic chemist, and obtained a PhD from Rajabazar Science College, Calcutta University in 1957. He stayed with IACS for two more years before moving to the US for his post-doctoral studies at three centres viz. University of Maine, the University of California, Berkeley and St. John’s University. He returned to India to IACS in 1963 to resume his career there and worked there till his official retirement from service in 1996; in between, he served as the head of the department of organic chemistry (1977–89) and as the director (1989–96). Later, he was associated with the Indian Institute of Chemical Biology as an INSA Senior Scientist.

Ghatak was married to Anindita and the couple lived in Kolkata. It was here he died, succumbing a massive heart attack, on 18 June 2005, at the age of 76, survived by his wife.

== Legacy ==
Ghatak's contributions were primarily on stereochemically controlled organic synthesis and he was known developing methodologies for the synthesis of polycarbocyclic diterpenoids and bridged-ring compounds. His work on the four possible racemates of deoxypodocarpic acid, deisopropyl dehydroabietic acid and the corresponding 5-epimers reportedly clarified some of the stereochemical uncertainties existed till then. He demonstrated total synthesis of compounds related to gibberellins, a group of growth-regulating plant hormones. The regio- and stereo-specific intramolecular alkylation rearrangements through diazoketones as well as new annulation reactions involving cationic and radical processes he developed widened the understanding of free radical cyclization chemistry.

Ghatak documented his researches by way of a book, A Century, 1876-1976 and a number of articles published in peer-reviewed journals; (Note: Please see Selected bibliography section) ResearchGate, an online article repository, has listed 148 of them. He mentored several doctoral scholars in their researches and his works have been cited by several authors. (Note: Please see Selected bibliography section) He was associated with journals such as Indian Journal of Chemistry (Sec B), Proceedings of Indian Academy of Sciences (Chem Sci) and Proceedings of the Indian National Science Academy as a member of their editorial boards and served as a member of the Indian National Science Academy Council from 1994 to 1996.

== Awards and honors ==
The Council of Scientific and Industrial Research awarded Ghatak the Shanti Swarup Bhatnagar Prize, one of the highest Indian science awards, in 1974. The Indian Academy of Sciences elected him as a fellow in 1976 and he became a fellow of the Indian National Science Academy in 1980. The Chemical Research Society of India awarded him the Lifetime Achievement Award in 2003. Among the several award orations he delivered were Professor K. Venkataraman Endowment Lecture (1982), Acharya P. C. Ray Memorial Lecture of Indian Chemical Society (1985), Professor N. V. Subba Rao Memorial Lecture (1986), Prof. R. C. Shah Memorial Lecture of Indian Science Congress Association (1986), T. R. Sheshadri Memorial Lecture of Delhi University (1987), Baba Kartar Singh Memorial Lecture of Panjab University (1990) and S. Swaminathan Sixtieth Birthday Commemoration Lecture of Indian National Science Academy (1994). He was also associated with the Royal Society of Chemistry and Chemical Society of London as an associate member. The Indian Association for the Cultivation of Science have instituted an annual oration, Professor U. R. Ghatak Endowment Lecture, in honor of Ghatak.

== Citations ==
- F.R. Hartley (22 October 2013). Chemistry of the Platinum Group Metals: Recent Developments. Elsevier Science. pp. 232–. ISBN 978-0-08-093395-5.
- Manfred Regitz (2 December 2012). Diazo Compounds: Properties and Synthesis. Elsevier. pp. 165–. ISBN 978-0-323-14472-8.
- Bentham Science Publishers (September 1999). Current Organic Chemistry. Bentham Science Publishers. pp. 495–.
- Vincent Lee (19 November 1990). Peptide and Protein Drug Delivery. CRC Press. pp. 123–. ISBN 978-0-8247-7896-5.
- The Alkaloids: Chemistry and Physiology. Academic Press. 11 November 1981. pp. 216–. ISBN 978-0-08-086542-3.
- G. T. Young (January 1971). Amino-acids, Peptides, and Proteins: A Review of the literature published during 1970. Volume 03. Royal Society of Chemistry. pp. 241–. ISBN 978-0-85186-024-4.

== Selected bibliography ==
=== Books ===
- Ghatak, Usha Ranjan (1976). A Century, 1876-1976. The Association. p. 313. ASIN B001NX22AE.

=== Articles ===
- Usha Ranjan Ghatak, Nithar Ranjan Chatterjee (1971). "A total synthesis of (±)-O-methyl-14-methylpodocarpic acid". J. Chem. Soc. C: 190–196. doi:10.1039/J39710000190.
- Gopa Sinha, Santosh K. Maji, Usha Ranjan Ghatak, Monika Mukherjee (née Mondal), Alok K. Mukherjee, Ajit K. Chakravarty (1983). "Condensed cyclic and bridged-ring system. Part 9. Stereocontrolled synthesis and X-ray structural analyses of cis-3,4,4a,9,10,10a-hexahydro-1,4a-ethanophenanthrene-2(1H),12-dione and trans-3,4,4a,9,10,10a-hexahydro-3,4a-ethanophenanthrene-2(1H), 12-dione". J. Chem. Soc., Perkin Trans. 1. 10: 2519–2528. doi:10.1039/P19830002519.
- B. Saha; Gopa Bhattacharjee; Usha Ranjan Ghatak (1986). "A novel synthetic method for angularly functionalized polycyclic systems by vinylogous wolff rearrangement of β, γ-unsaturated diazoketones". Tetrahedron Letters. 27 (33): 3913–3914. doi:10.1016/S0040-4039(00)83915-5.
- Subrata GhoshUsha Ranjan Ghatak (April 1988). "Carbon-carbon bond formation and annulation reactions using trimethyl and triethyl orthoformates". Proceedings of the Indian Academy of Sciences - Chemical Sciences. 100 (2): 235–252. doi:10.1007/BF02839451. S2CID 93780028.
- Bimal K. Banik, Usha Ranjan Ghatak (December 1989). "Synthetic studies towards complex diterpenoids-171: synthesis and oxidative cleavage of ()-19,20-cycloabieta-19-oxo-8,11,13-triene". Tetrahedron. 45 (11): 3547–3556. doi:10.1016/S0040-4020(01)81033-4.

== See also ==
- Gibberellin
