= Sadhan Basu =

Indian chemist (1922-1992)

- Born: 2 January 1922; Calcutta, Bengal Presidency, British Raj (now Kolkata, West Bengal, India)
- Died: 5 October 1992 (aged 70); Kolkata, West Bengal, India
- Education: Rajabazar Science College; University of Calcutta
- Known for: Studies on geometry of molecular complexes
- Awards: 1965 Shanti Swarup Bhatnagar Prize; 1984 ICS Acharya JC Ghosh Gold Medal; 1988 C. V. Raman Birth Centenary Commemoration Medal
- Scientific career
- Fields: Polymer chemistry; Quantum chemistry
- Workplaces: University of Calcutta
- Doctoral advisor: Prafulla Kumar Bose
- Doctoral students: Mihir Chowdhury; Animesh Chakravorty

Sadhan Basu FNA, FASc, FRSC (2 January 1922 – 5 October 1992) was an Indian physical chemist, academic and the Palit Professor of Chemistry at the University of Calcutta from 1964 to 1985. He was known for his elucidation of the Quantum Mechanical Model of Robert S. Mulliken. His article, Degree of Polymerization and Chain Transfer in Methyl Methacrylate, co-authored with Jyotirindra Nath Sen and Santi R. Palit was the first published Indian article on polymer chemistry. He was an elected fellow of the Royal Society of Chemistry, Chemical Society of France, Indian Chemical Society, Indian National Science Academy and the Indian Academy of Sciences. The Council of Scientific and Industrial Research, the apex agency of the Government of India for scientific research, awarded him the Shanti Swarup Bhatnagar Prize for Science and Technology, one of the highest Indian science awards, in 1962, for his contributions to chemical sciences.

== Biography ==
Basu was born on 2 January 1922 in Kolkata (then Calcutta), to Jyotish Chandra Basu and Sarajubala. Educated in the city, he graduated with a B.Sc. from the University of Calcutta in 1942, obtaining an M.Sc. from the same university at the Rajabazar Science College campus in 1944. He then conducted research into the properties of shellac at the Indian Lac Research Institute (now the Indian Institute of Natural Resins and Gums) under the supervision of noted chemist Prafulla Kumar Bose (1898-1983), for which he earned a D.Sc. from the Rajabazar Science College, Calcutta University in 1948. In 1948, Basu joined the faculty of the Indian Association for the Cultivation of Science, where he conducted pioneering research on chain transfer in radical polymerisation and established a standard procedure for estimating the molecular weight of polymers. From 1951 to 1953, he was a postdoctoral Fulbright fellow in chemistry at the Indiana University Bloomington, where he developed an interest in the emerging field of quantum chemistry. Upon returning to India, he published six papers on free electron molecular orbital calculations.

In 1954, Basu joined the faculty of the University of Calcutta as a reader; he would remain at the university for the next three decades. One of the pioneers of polymer chemistry in India, his studies were primarily in the fields of charge transfer interactions, ligand field spectra, hydrogen bonding, quantum chemistry and photochemistry. Focusing on the detection and analysis of the charge transfer band of molecular complexes and through experimental assignment of its vibrational structure, he supported the quantum mechanical model of the complexes originally propounded by Robert S. Mulliken, the winner of the 1966 Nobel Prize for Chemistry. In order to determine the -NH2 group in nylon, he developed a methodology which has since been accepted as a standard industrial procedure. He calculated the transition energies and oscillator strengths of aromatic polyhydrocarbons using the gas model prescribed by Shin'ichirō Tomonaga in 1950. He thus demonstrated that extended catacondensed planar structures could be derived only by using 3-4-6 membered rings and employing the Hartree-Fock and Bogolyubov methods, illustrated that, unlike triplet transitions, the longest wavelength singlet transitions in linear polyenes converge to a limit. Basu's research was published in a number of articles and the article, Degree of Polymerization and Chain Transfer in Methyl Methacrylate, he and his co-authors, J. N. Sen and S. R. Palit, published in 1950 was the first Indian article on polymer chemistry. He was associated with the International Journal of Quantum Chemistry, the Indian Journal of Chemistry and the Proceedings of the Indian National Science Academy as their associate editor. He mentored a number of students in their doctoral research.

During 1961-62, Basu was a visiting professor at Indiana University Bloomington and was subsequently (1962–63) a visiting professor in the quantum chemistry group at the University of Uppsala. Following his return to India, Basu was appointed to the Palit Professorship of Chemistry at the Rajabazar Science College or University College of Science & Technology in 1964, the chair of which he held until his superannuation and retirement. He also served as the head of the university's chemistry department from 1978 to 1980. In 1981, he was appointed the director of the Indian Association for the Cultivation of Science, but relinquished the post in 1982 due to ill health. He also served the Indian National Science Academy council during 1982-84 as a member. Basu retired from the University of Calcutta in 1985, and died on 5 October 1992, at the age of 70. He was survived by his wife, Rama Basu, who was also a theoretical chemist, and their son and daughter. His scientific contributions have been documented in an article, Sadhan Basu — a physical chemist extraordinaire, published in the Resonance journal in 2013.

== Awards and honors ==
The Indian National Science Academy elected Basu as a fellow in 1962 and the Council of Scientific and Industrial Research awarded him the Shanti Swarup Bhatnagar Prize, one of the highest Indian science awards, in 1965. A UGC National Professor during 1972–73, he became an elected fellow of the Indian Academy of Sciences in 1975. He was a recipient of the Acharya J. C. Ghosh Gold Medal of the Indian Chemical Society (1984) and the C. V. Raman Birth Centenary Commemoration Medal of the Indian Science Congress Association (1988). In 1957, he was appointed a Fellow of the Royal Institute of Chemistry (FRIC), which merged with the Chemical Society in 1980 to become the Royal Society for Chemistry. He was also a fellow of the Indian Chemical Society and the Society of Physical Chemistry of France. The Indian Academy of Sciences issued a festschrift, Dedicated to Prof. Sadhan Basu on the occasion of his sixtyfifth birthday, on him in 1986 on his 65th birth anniversary. The contributors included Jack Simons, Debashis Mukherjee, Werner Kutzelnigg and George G. Hall among others. The Indian National Science Academy has instituted an annual oration, Professor Sadhan Basu Memorial Lecture in his honor and the University of Kolkata recognizes excellence in research in chemistry each year by an annual award, the Professor Sadhan Basu Memorial Award.

== See also ==
- Robert S. Mulliken
- Hartree–Fock method
- Bogoliubov transformation
