= Mariappan Periasamy =

Indian organometallic chemist

- Born: 6 October 1952 (age 73); Srivilliputtur, Tamil Nadu, India
- Education: American College, Madurai; Indian Institute of Science; Purdue University
- Known for: Development of organic synthetic methods using boron and transition metal reagents
- Awards: 1979 IISc Professor B. H. Iyer Medal; 1992 Dr. Husain Zaheer Science Foundation Young Scientist Award; 1996 Shanti Swarup Bhatnagar Prize; 2007 CRSI Silver Medal
- Scientific career
- Fields: Organometallic chemistry; Enantioselective synthesis
- Workplaces: University of Hyderabad; National Center for Scientific Research; University of Amsterdam; University of Marburg
- Doctoral advisor: M. V. Bhatt; Herbert C. Brown

Mariappan Periasamy (born 1952) is an Indian organometallic chemist and a professor at the School of Chemistry of the University of Hyderabad. He is known for his experiments using carbon metal bonds for constructing diverse types of molecular structures, and is an elected fellow of the Indian National Science Academy and the Indian Academy of Sciences The Council of Scientific and Industrial Research, the apex agency of the Government of India for scientific research, awarded him the Shanti Swarup Bhatnagar Prize for Science and Technology, one of the highest Indian science awards, in 1996, for his contributions to chemical sciences.

== Biography ==
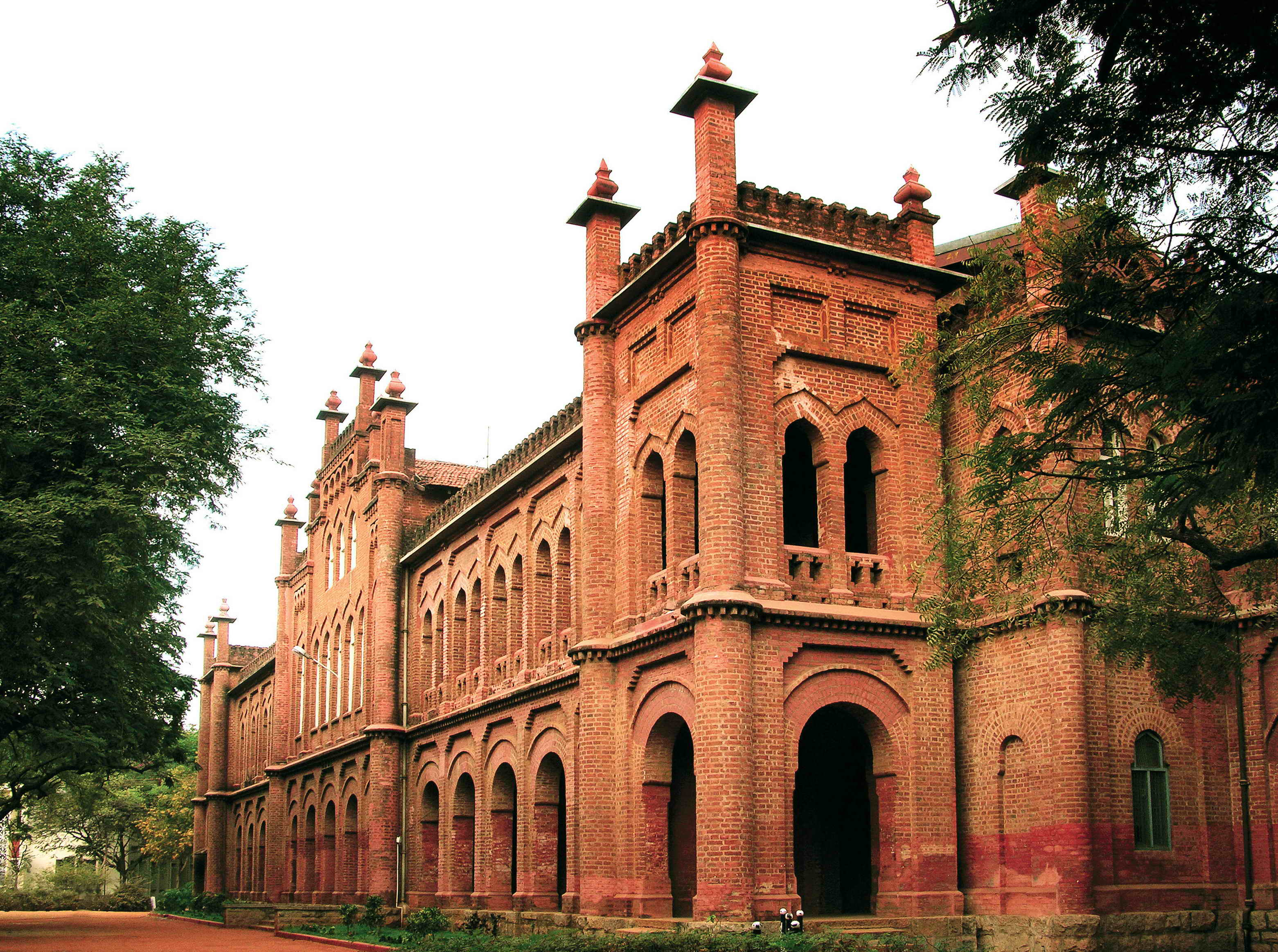
The American College, Madurai

M. Periasamy, born to Duraisamy Mariappanadar and Krishnammal couple on 6 October 1952, at Srivilliputtur, a historical town in Virudhunagar district of the south Indian state of Tamil Nadu, did his early schooling at Kammapatty Primary School and C. M. S. High School, Srivilliputtur and joined St. John's College, Palayamkottai from where he completed his pre-university course in 1970. His graduate (1970–73) and master's courses (1973–75) were done at American College, Madurai and he secured a PhD from the Indian Institute of Science in 1979 studying Mechanism of Oxidation of Aromatic Rings under the guidance of M. V. Bhatt. He moved to the US the same year where he did his post-doctoral studies at the laboratory of Herbert C. Brown, a Nobel laureate at Purdue University, researching on Nonclassical Ion Problem, one of the favorite topics of Brown. On his return to India in 1982, he joined the School of Chemistry of the University of Hyderabad where he serves as a professor since 1993. In between, he served as a visiting scientist at National Center for Scientific Research in 1995 and as a visiting professor at University of Amsterdam, (1996) and University of Marburg (1997).

Periasamy is married to Hemavathy Paramasivam and the couple has two children. The family lives in Hyderabad.

== Legacy ==
Periasamy is noted for his development of new synthetic protocols such as the construction of diverse types of molecular structures using carbon metal bonds. He leads a team which have developed new procedures for preparing organometallics and chiral reagents and many of them are in use with laboratories and industries, NaBH_{4}/I_{2} reagent system designed by his team is one such process which has become industry standard. He has also developed cost effective process for generating electricity from biomass and solar energy. His researches have been documented in a number of articles; ResearchGate, an online article repository, has listed 276 of them. He serves as a member of the International Scientific Committee on Boron Chemistry since 2007 and has been associated with several science journals as a member of their editorial boards.

== Awards and honors ==
Periasamy received the Professor B. H. Iyer Medal of the Indian Institute of Science in 1979 and the Dr. Husain Zaheer Science Foundation Young Scientist Award of the Indian Institute of Chemical Technology in 1992. The Indian Academy of Sciences elected him as their fellow in 1994 and the Council of Scientific and Industrial Research awarded him the Shanti Swarup Bhatnagar Prize, one of the highest Indian science awards, in 1996. A J. C. Bose National Fellow of the Department of Science and Technology during 2006–11, he became a fellow of the Indian National Science Academy in 2005 and received the Silver Medal by the Chemical Research Society of India in 2007. He has delivered several award orations including Professor N. S. Narasimhan Endowment Award of Pune University (1995), Professor A. B. Kulkarni Endowment Lecture of University of Mumbai (1999), and Professor D. P. Chakraborty 60th Birth Anniversary Award of Indian Chemical Society (2004).

== See also ==
- Enantioselective synthesis
- Herbert C. Brown
