= Anuradha Acharya =

Indian entrepreneur

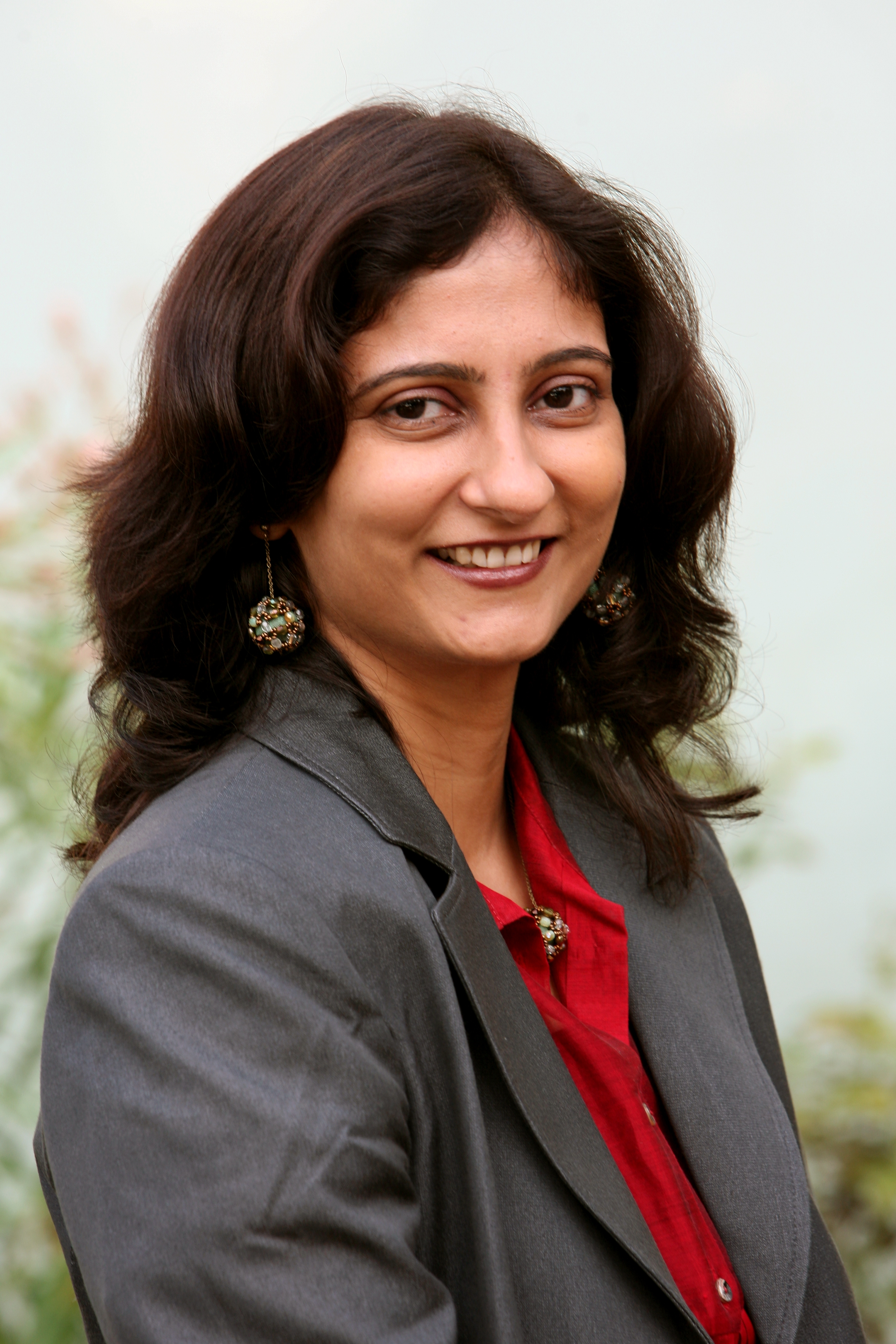
- Born: 1972 (age 53–54); Bikaner, India
- Citizenship: Indian
- Education: IIT Kharagpur; University of Illinois at Chicago
- Known for: Genomics
- Awards: Young Global Leader, World Economic Forum

Anuradha Acharya (born 1972) is an Indian entrepreneur. She is the founder and CEO of Ocimum Bio Solutions and Mapmygenome. She was awarded Young Global Leader by the World Economic Forum in 2011.

== Early life ==
Acharya was born in Bikaner but spent most of her life in Kharagpur. Acharya graduated from IIT Kharagpur in 1995. She then moved to Chicago in 1995 and acquired Master of Science in Physics and MIS (Management Information Systems) from the University of Illinois at Chicago.

== Positions held ==
Acharya is the founder and was the CEO of Ocimum Bio Solutions, a genomics outsourcing company for discovery, development and diagnostics, headquartered in Hyderabad, India from 2000 to 2013. She also serves as a member of the governing body of Council of Scientific & Industrial Research, on the board for the National Institute of Biomedical Genomics based in Kalyani, West Bengal, on the Global Agenda Council on Genetics 2011 in the capacity of Vice Chair.

She is also a board member for the Association of Biotech Enterprises, is on the advisory board for the Action for India and on the board of mentors at IvyCap Ventures.

== Awards and recognition ==
Acharya was named by Red Herring Magazine to the list of 25 Tech Titans under 35 in 2006. Acharya has also received the Entrepreneur of the year award by BioSpectrum magazine. and the Astia Life Science Innovators Award in 2008. Acharya has been honoured as a 2011 Young Global Leader by the World Economic Forum. Acharya was awarded ET Women Ahead honor by the Economic Times in 2015. She was named in the 2018 W-power trailblazers by Forbes.

Acharya has a book on Poetry published called "Atomic Pohe- Random Rhymes at odd times- On Science, Non Science and Nonsense." Acharya has written a chapter on Research as a Service (RaaS) in the book Pharmaceutical Outsourcing: Discovery and Preclinical Services (Pharmaceutical Outsourcing, Volume I). Acharya also published an article in Nature Biotechnology called "What mergers can do for you" and is an active contributor to various other magazines and newspapers like the Hindu Business Line.

== Personal life ==
Acharya was born to a professor and lived early years of her life in a campus town. Acharya is married to Subash Lingareddy, founder and CFO of Ocimum Bio Solutions. They have two daughters, Neha and Akhila.

== See also ==
- Genome Valley
