= Indian Association for the Cultivation of Science =

Research University in Kolkata

- Official Emblem of IACS
- Motto: tanvaṁ apāvṛṇu
- Motto in English: Unveil the self
- Type: Public research university
- Established: c. 1876; 150 years ago
- Founder: Mahendralal Sarkar
- Academic affiliations: UGC; AIU
- Budget: ₹258.73 crore (US$26.9 million) (2025–26)
- President: Renu Swarup
- Director: Kalobaran Maiti
- Location: Kolkata, West Bengal, India; 22°29′55.53″N 88°22′1.52″E
- Campus: Metropolis
- Language: English
- Journal: Indian Journal of Physics
- Website: www.iacs.res.in

University and College rankings

Global – Overall
- CWUR World: 1092 (2021)

National – Overall
- CWUR National: 19 (2021)

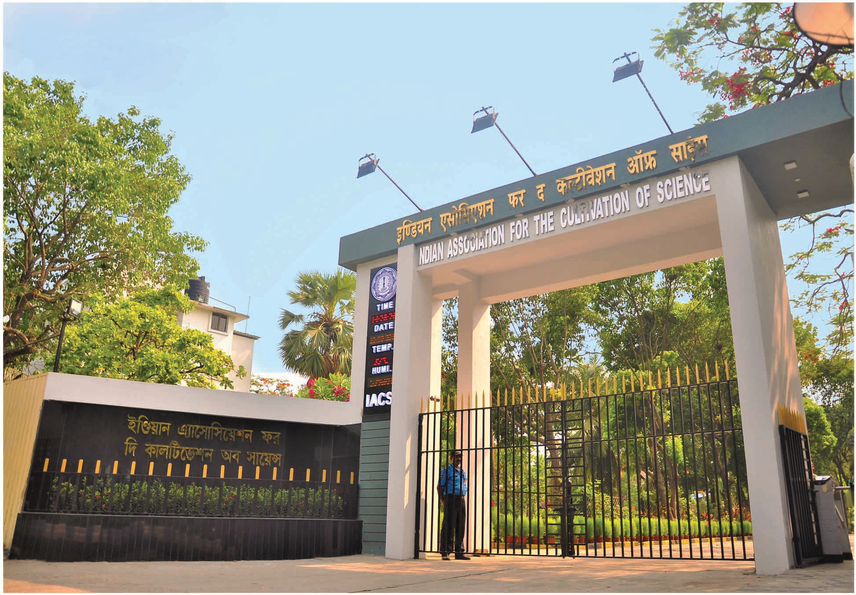
IACS main entrance in Jadavpur, Kolkata.

Indian Association for the Cultivation of Science (IACS) is a public, deemed, research university for higher education and research in basic sciences under the Department of Science & Technology, Government of India. Established on 29 July 1876 by Mahendralal Sarkar, a private medical practitioner, it focuses on fundamental research in basic sciences. It is India's oldest research institute located at Jadavpur, South Kolkata near Jadavpur University, Central Glass and Ceramic Research Institute and Indian Institute of Chemical Biology. It is spread over a limited area of 9.5 acres and currently in the process of building an advanced SMART campus at Baruipur.

The association is engaged in research in various fields of physical sciences, chemical sciences, biological sciences, mathematical and computational sciences, materials sciences and various applied and interdisciplinary sciences areas.

== Indian Journal of Physics (IJP) ==
Indian Journal of Physics was founded in 1926. It is published monthly. Springer distributes print version of the Journal worldwide. The present chief editor of the journal is Prof. Subham Majumdar, who is a senior professor in the School of Physical Sciences, IACS.

== Second Campus (Offshore Campus at Baruipur) ==
On September 13, 2018, Dr. Harsh Vardhan, the Union Minister of Science and Technology, unveiled the foundation stone of the Syamaprasad Mukherjee Advanced Research and Training (SMART) campus of the IACS at Baruipur, Kolkata. The SMART campus is envisioned as a state-of-the-art facility dedicated to fostering cutting-edge research and training across multidisciplinary research, including Fundamental sciences, Engineering sciences, Medical sciences, Named after Syamaprasad Mukherjee, a notable Indian politician and academic, this campus aims to serve as a hub for innovation and scientific advancement in India.

== Academic Divisions ==
Starting from 2018, after being declared as a deemed university by MHRD, for academic purposes, departments and centres in the Institute are broadly assigned to six major schools, each headed by a Chairperson (School Chair):

- School of Applied and Interdisciplinary Sciences (SAIS)
- School of Biological Sciences (SBS)
- School of Chemical Sciences (SCS)
- School of Materials Sciences (SMS)
- School of Mathematical and Computational Sciences (SMCS)
- School of Physical Sciences (SPS)

Apart from these six major schools, there are a few centers, designed to perform specific and cutting-edge research, by the institute administration:

- Centre for Computer Research, Education and Services (CCRES)
- Director's Research Unit (DRU)
- Technical Research Center (TRC)
- Central Scientific Services (CSS)
- Raman Centre of Atomic, Molecular & Optical Sciences
- Polymer Structural Unit
- Energy Research Unit

== Administration ==
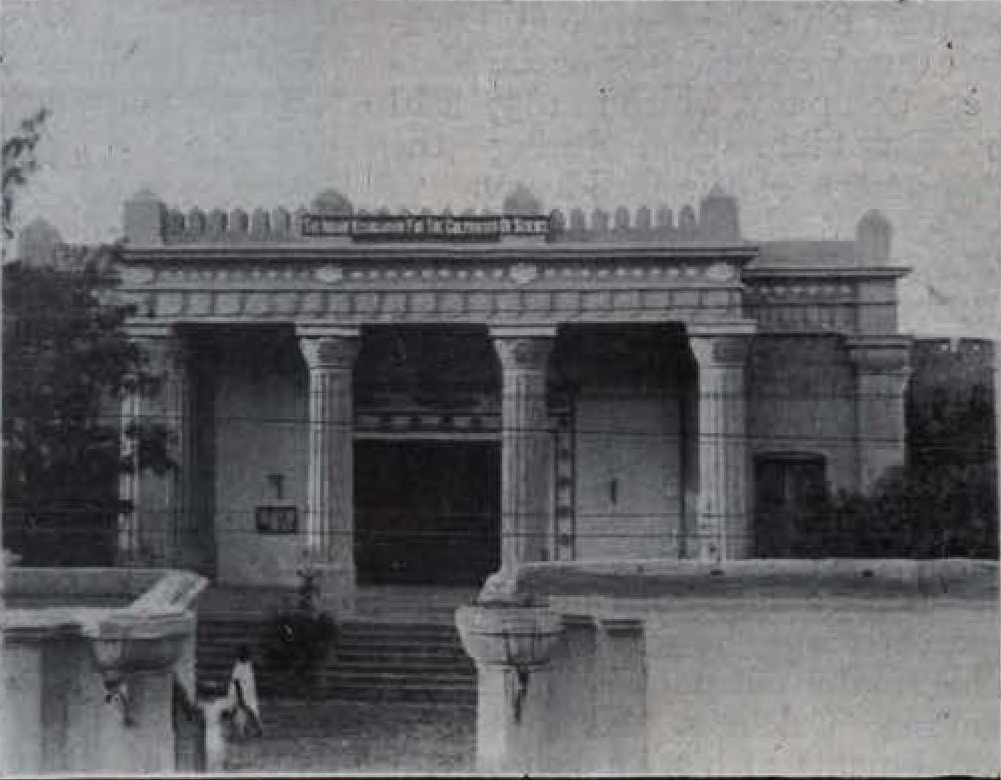
Office c. 1907

At its inception, the IACS was headed by a president, with the Honorary Secretary responsible for the day-to-day running of the Society. Until 1911, the office of President was de facto held by the Lieutenant-Governor of Bengal, when the Lieutenant-Governor (Governor from 1912) became the co-patron of the Society alongside the Viceroy of India, whose office-holders were automatically Patrons of the Society until 1947. (Note: With the exceptions of Sir (later Lord) Antony MacDonnell (Lieutenant-Governor 1893-1895), Sir Charles Cecil Stevens (Lieutenant-Governor 1897-1898), James Bourdillon (Lieutenant-Governor 1902-1903), Sir Lancelot Hare (Lieutenant-Governor 1906) and Francis Slacke (Lieutenant-Governor 1906-1908).) Following India's independence in 1947, the administration of the IACS was reconstituted, with the designation of "Honorary Director" substituted for "Honorary Secretary." The Director's prefix of "Honorary" was dropped in 1953. Post 1947, according to Article 12 of the Constitution of India status of the institute has changed.

=== Presidents of the IACS (1876-present) ===
- Sir Richard Temple, 1st Baronet FRS (1876-1877)
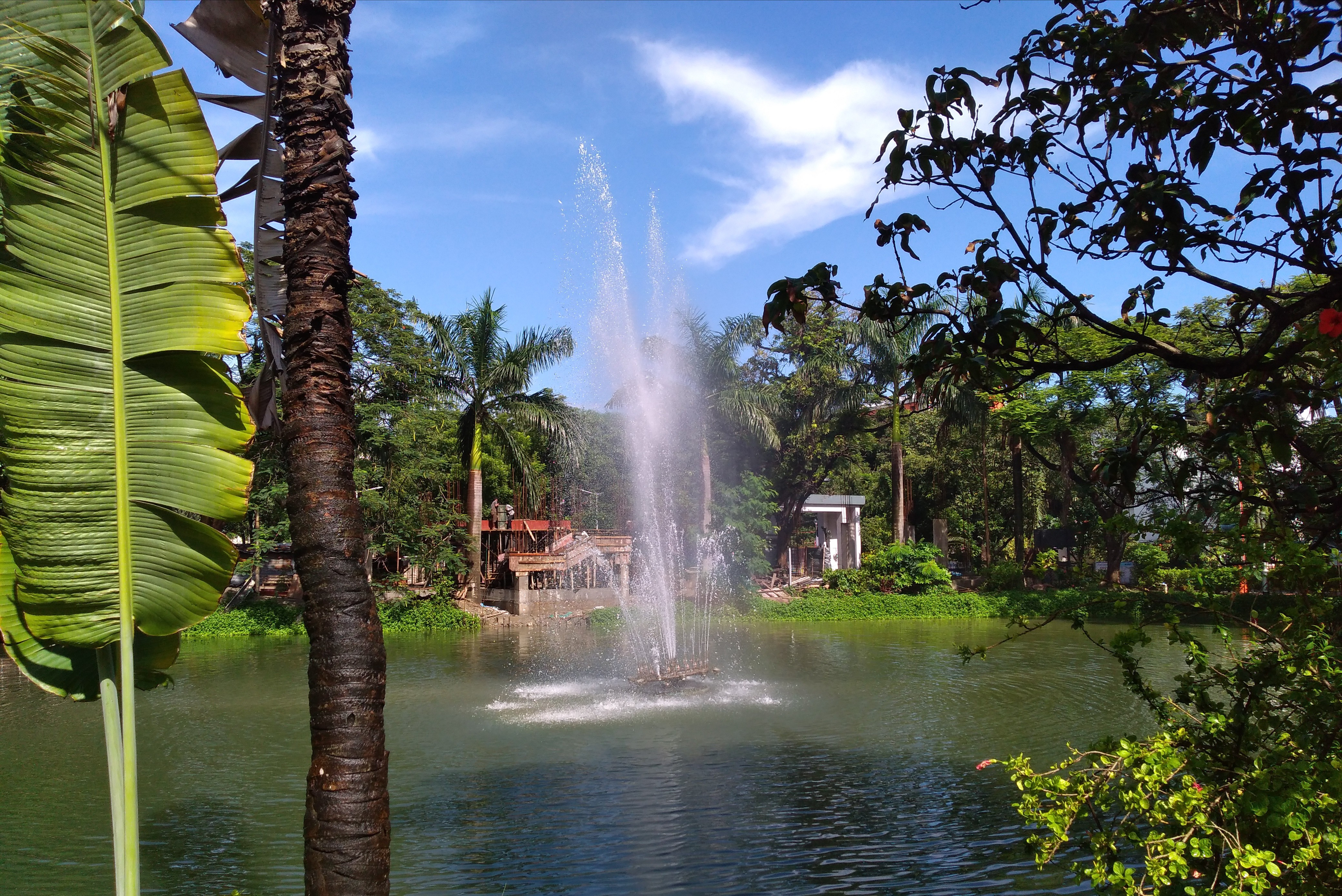
- Mahendra Sarobar, IACS
  The Hon. Sir Ashley Eden FASB (1877-1882)
- Sir Augustus Rivers Thompson (1882-1887)
- Sir Steuart Bayley (1887-1890)
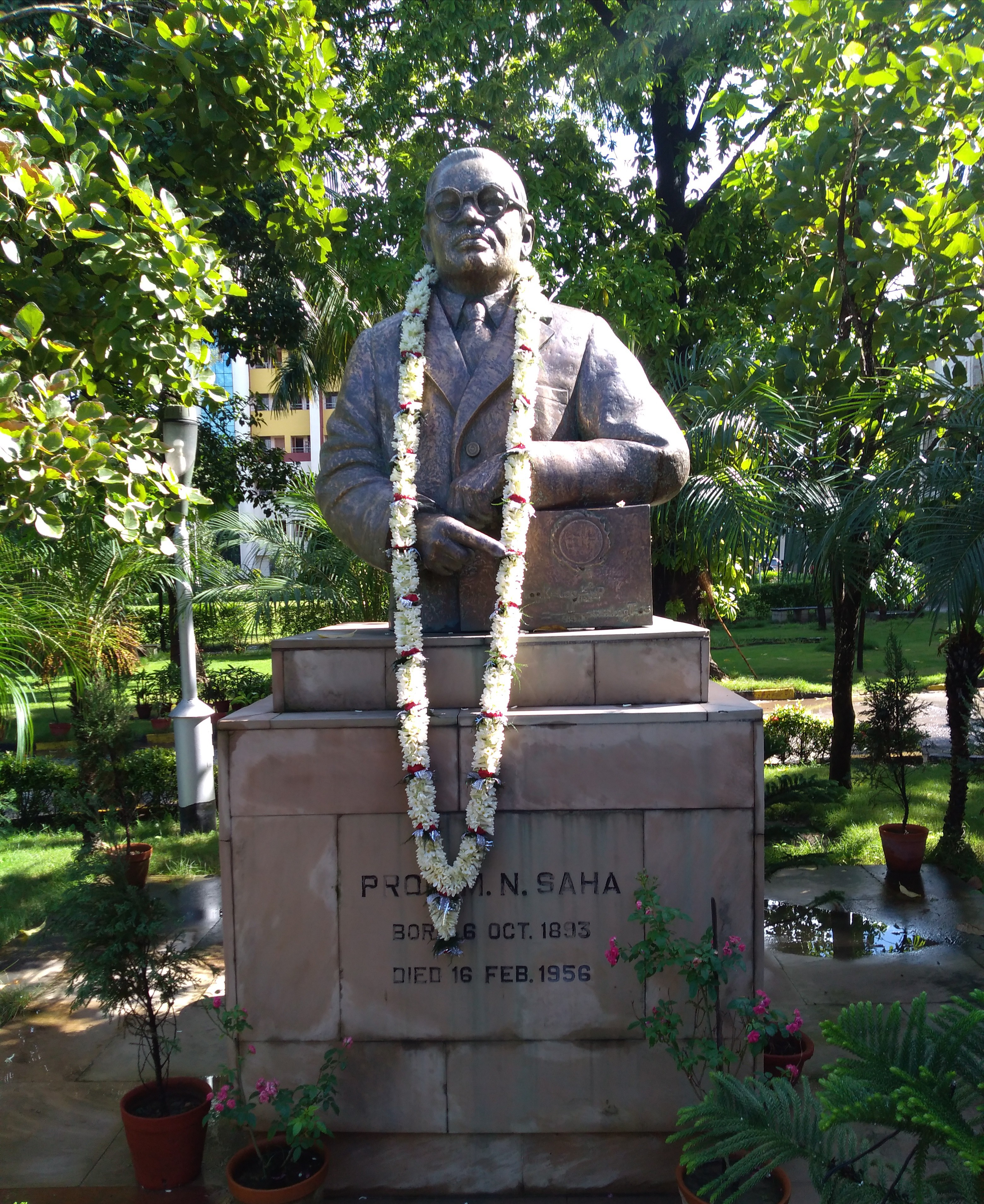
- Prof. Meghnad Saha, first director of IACS
  Sir Charles Alfred Elliott FASB (1890-1895)
- Sir Alexander Mackenzie (1895-1898)
- Sir John Woodburn (1898-1903)
- Sir Andrew Henderson Leith Fraser FASB (1903-1909)
- Sir Edward Norman Baker (1909-1911)
- Raja Pyare Mohan Mukherjee FASB (1911-1922)
- Hon. Justice Sir Ashutosh Mukherjee FASB, FRSE, FRAS, MRIA (1922-1924)
- Sir Rajendra Nath Mookerjee FASB (1924-1934?)
- Sir Nilratan Sircar (1934-1942)
- Prof. Rai Bahadur Sir Upendranath Brahmachari FNI, FASB (1942-1946)
- Prof. Meghnad Saha FNI, FASB, FRS (1946-1951)
- Prof. Sir Jnan Chandra Ghosh FNI (1951-1954)
- Hon. Justice Charu Chandra Biswas (1954-1957)
- Hon. Chief Justice Phani Bhusan Chakravartti (1957-1958)
- Prof. Satyendra Nath Bose FNI, FRS (1958-1962)
- Hon. Justice Rama Prasad Mookerjee (1962-1965)
- Prof. Jnanendra Nath Mukherjee FNI, FCS (1965-1968)
- Prof. Basanti Dulal Nagchaudhuri FNA (first term, 1968–1970) (Note: Prior to 1970, the Indian National Science Academy was named the "National Institute of Sciences of India", and its fellows bore the post-nominal "FNI". The post-nominal became "FNA" in 1970 when the association adopted its present name.)
- Prof. Sushil Kumar Mukherjee FNA (first term, 1970–1973)
- Prof. Sukumar Chandra Sirkar FNA (1973-1974)
- Prof. Basanti Dulal Nagchaudhuri FNA (second term, 1974–1977)
- Prof. Bimal Kumar Bachhawat FNA (1977-1983)
- Prof. Sushil Kumar Mukherjee FNA (second term, 1983–1997)
- Prof. Arun Kumar Sharma FNA, FASc (1997-2000)
- Prof. M. M. Chakraborty (2000-2003)

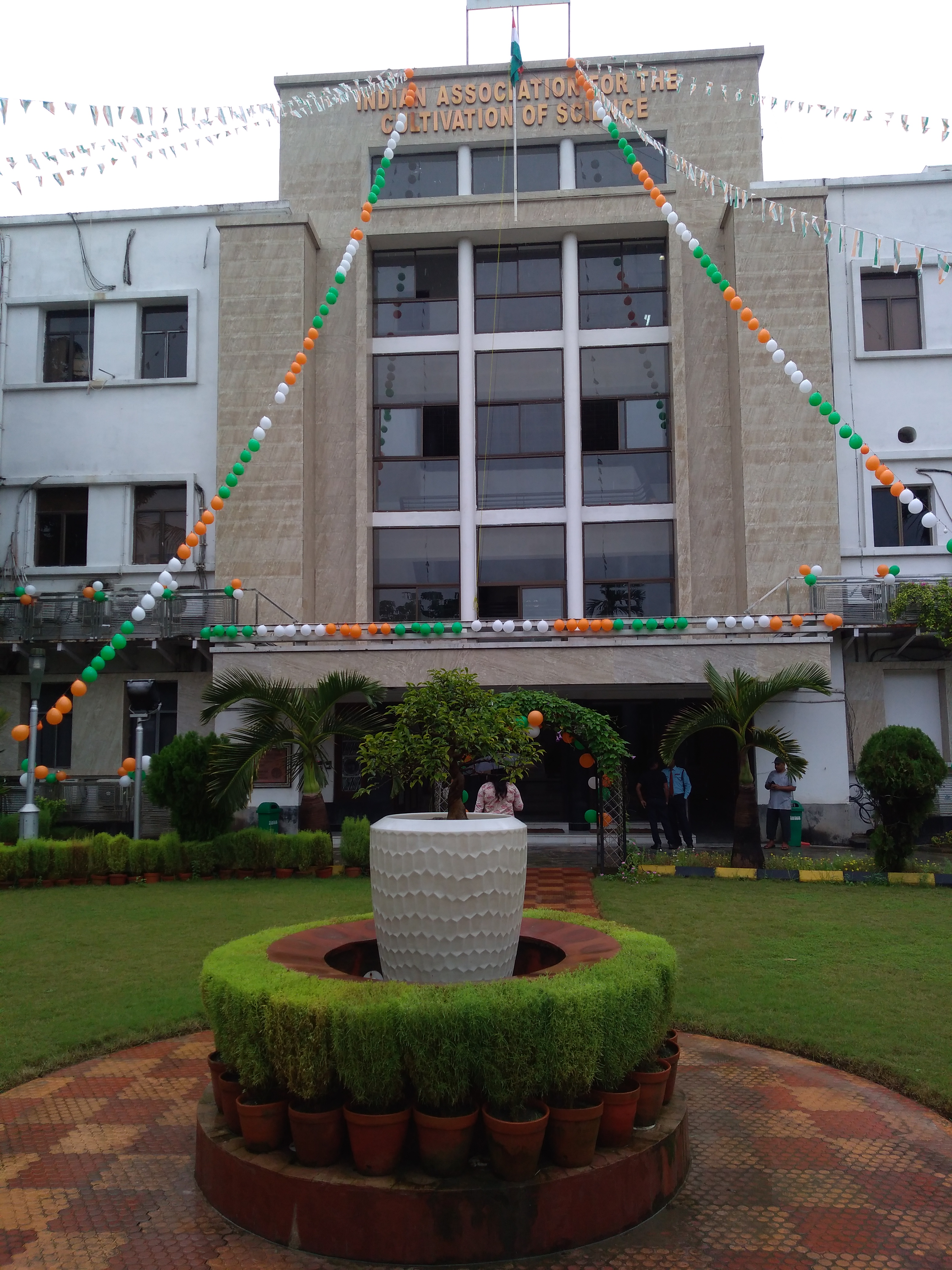
Independence Day celebration at IACS (15 August 2019)

- Prof. Ashesh Prosad Mitra FNA, FASc, FRS (2003-2007)
- Prof. Shri Krishna Joshi FNA, FASc (2007-2014)
- Prof. Man Mohan Sharma FNA, FASc, FRS, FREng (2014–2021)
- Prof. Srivari Chandrasekhar, FNA, FASc (2021 – 2022)
- Prof. Vinod K. Singh, FNA, FASc, FNASc, FTWAS (2022–present)

=== Secretaries and Directors of the IACS ===
==== Honorary Secretaries of the IACS (1876-1947) ====
Name	Period in office	Duration in office
Mahendralal Sarkar (Founder)	15 January 1876 – 23 February 1904	28 years, 1 month and 8 days
Amritalal Sarkar	16 June 1904 – 8 September 1919	15 years, 2 months and 23 days
C. V. Raman	18 September 1919 – 31 March 1933	13 years, 6 months and 13 days
K. S. Krishnan	31 March 1933 – 19 June 1934	1 year, 2 months and 19 days
Sisir Kumar Mitra	19 June 1934–November 1935	1 year, 5 months
Jnanendra Nath Mukherjee	November 1935–31 December 1943	8 years, 1 month
Meghnad Saha	31 December 1943–October 1944	9 months
Priyadaranjan Ray (acting)	October–31 December 1944	2 months
Priyadaranjan Ray	1 January 1945 – 1 October 1947	2 years and 9 months

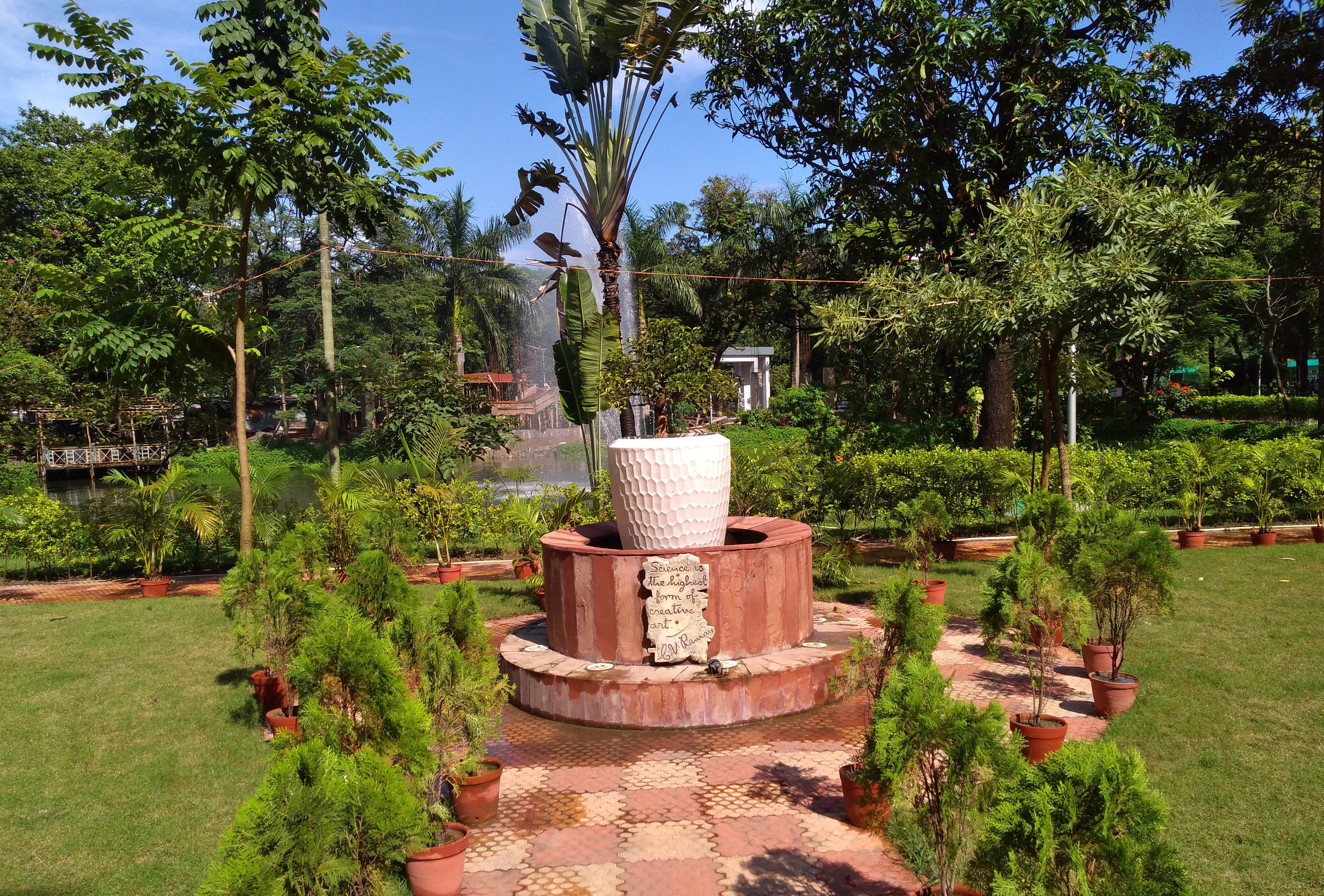

==== Honorary Directors of the IACS (1947-1953) ====
Name	Period in office	Duration in office
Priyadaranjan Ray	1 October 1947 – 1 January 1953	5 years and 3 months

==== Directors of the IACS (1953-present) ====
Name	Period in office	Duration in office
Meghnad Saha	1 January 1953 – 16 February 1956	3 years, 1 month and 15 days
Priyadaranjan Ray (officiating)	4 March 1956 – 2 December 1958	2 years, 8 months and 28 days
Sukumar Chandra Sirkar (acting)	8 December 1958 – 10 December 1959	1 year and 2 days
Kedareswar Banerjee	11 December 1959 – 1 October 1965	5 years, 9 months and 20 days
Bishwambhar Nath Srivastava (acting)	1 October 1965 – 31 December 1968	3 years, 2 months and 30 days
Debidas Basu	1 January 1969 – 31 August 1980	11 years, 7 months and 30 days
G. S. Banerjee IAS (acting)	19 September 1980 – 8 March 1981	5 months and 17 days
Sadhan Basu	9 March 1981 – 14 July 1982 (Note: On medical leave from 14 July 1982, resigned with effect from 24 August.)	1 year, 4 months and 5 days
G. S. Banerjee IAS (acting)	14 July–8 December 1982	4 months and 24 days
Asok Kumar Barua (acting)	9–30 December 1982	21 days
Asok Kumar Barua	31 December 1982 – 1989	6 years
Usha Ranjan Ghatak	1989–1993	4 years
Dipankar Chakravorty	1993–9 September 1999	6 years
Debashis Mukherjee	10 September 1999 – 31 March 2009	9 years, 6 months and 21 days
Kankan Bhattacharyya	1 April 2009 – 10 February 2013	3 years, 10 months and 9 days
Subhas Chandra Roy (acting)	10 February–11 September 2013	7 months and 1 day
Deb Shankar Ray (acting)	11 September 2013 – 21 April 2015	1 year, 7 months and 10 days
Santanu Bhattacharya	22 April 2015 – 23 April 2021	6 years and 1 day
Tapas Chakraborty (acting, additional charge)	24 April 2021–6 April 2023	1 year, 11 months and 14 days
Ranjan Sen	6 April 2023 – 15 April 2024	1 year and 9 days
Arindam Banerjee (acting, additional charge)	15 April 2024 – 19 March 2025	11 months and 4 days
Kalobaran Maiti	19 March 2025 – Present	1 year, 4 months and 15 days

== Notable alumni and associates ==
=== Nobel Laureate ===
- Sir C.V. Raman, FRS, Former Faculty of IACS

=== Bharat Ratna (Highest Civil Honor in India) ===
- Sir C.V. Raman, FRS, Former Faculty of IACS
- Prof. C.N.R. Rao, FRS, Former Chairman of Review Committee of IACS

=== Fellow of the Royal Society (FRS), London ===
- Sashibhushan, FRGS FRSA
- Sir J. C. Bose, former faculty of IACS
- Sir C. V. Raman, former faculty of IACS
- Babu Mahendranath Roy, CIE, one of the earliest faculty members of IACS
- Prof. Meghnad Saha, former faculty and Director of IACS
- K. S. Krishnan, alumnus, former faculty of IACS
- S. N. Bose, former faculty of IACS
- A. P. Mitra, former Chairman of the IACS Council
- C. N. R. Rao, former Chairman of the Review Committee of IACS and IACS Fellow
- M. M. Sharma, former Chairman of the IACS Governing Council and IACS Fellow
- TV Ramakrishnan (IACS Fellow)
- Ajay Sood (IACS Fellow)

=== Padma Vibhushan (Civil Honor in India) ===
- C. N. R. Rao, former Chairman of the Review Committee of IACS and IACS Fellow
- M. M. Sharma, former Chairman of the IACS Governing Council and IACS Fellow

=== Padma Bhusan (Civil Honor in India) ===
- K. S. Krishnan, alumnus, former faculty of IACS

Padma Shri (Civil Honor in India)

- Vinod K. Singh, Chairman of Governing Council, IACS

=== TWAS Prize ===
- C. N. R. Rao, former Chairman of the Review Committee of IACS and IACS Fellow
- Animesh Chakravorty, former faculty of IACS
- Kankan Bhattacharyya, former student, faculty and Director of IACS
- Santanu Bhattacharya, former Director of IACS
- D. D. Sharma, former faculty member, IACS

=== Alexander von Humboldt Research Award ===
- D. Mukherjee, former student, faculty and Director of IACS

=== Fellow of the World Academy of Sciences (FTWAS) ===
- C. N. R. Rao, former Chairman of the Review Committee of IACS and IACS Fellow
- D. Mukherjee, former student, faculty and Director of IACS
- Kankan Bhattacharyya, former student, faculty and Director of IACS
- Santanu Bhattacharya, former Director of IACS
- T. Saha-Dasgupta, former Faculty of IACS

=== Shanti Swarup Bhatnagar (SSB) Prize ===
- K. S. Krishnan, alumnus, former faculty of IACS
- S. Basu, received in 1965, former faculty of IACS
- C. N. R. Rao, former Chairman of the Review Committee of IACS and IACS Fellow
- U. R. Ghatak, former Director and faculty of IACS
- Animesh Chakravorty, former faculty of IACS
- Mihir Chowdhury, former faculty of IACS
- D. Mukherjee, former student, faculty and Director of IACS
- Kankan Bhattacharyya, former student, faculty and Director of IACS
- Akhil R. Chakravarty, former Student of IACS
- D. S. Ray, former student and faculty of IACS
- Sourav Pal, former student of IACS
- Santanu Bhattacharya, former Director of IACS
- Samaresh Bhattacharya, former Student of IACS
- Krishnendu Sengupta, present faculty member, IACS
- Pradyut Ghosh, present faculty member, IACS
- P. S. Mukherjee, former Student of IACS
- Jyotirmayee Dash, present faculty member, IACS

== Notable research works ==
Nobel laureate Sir C. V. Raman conducted his work on the Raman effect in this institute. His work was first published in the Indian Journal of Physics, which is published by IACS.

At the university, Debashis Mukherjee developed the Mk-MRCC method to account for electron correlations in molecular systems. Another important discovery has been in the area of solvation dynamics of molecules and in particular the dynamics of water molecules around the surfaces of membranes. These experiments performed by Professor Kankan Bhattacharyya provided an insight into the behavior of water near biological surfaces and led to his coining of the phrase "biological water".

Scientists at the Indian Association for the Cultivation of Science (IACS) in Kolkata found a new way to target cancer cells, focusing on how they repair DNA during division. This could lead to better treatments, especially for patients resistant to current drugs.
