= Kalobaran Maiti =

Indian physicist

Kalobaran Maiti FNAS FASc FNA

Director of Indian Association for the Cultivation of Science
- Incumbent
- Assumed office 19 March 2025
- Preceded by: Santanu Bhattacharya

Professor at Tata Institute of Fundamental Research
- Incumbent
- Assumed office 2016

Personal details
- Born: 1967 (age 58–59)
- Education: Presidency College (BSc 1989); Rajabazar Science College (MSc 1991); Indian Institute of Science (PhD 1998)
- Profession: Professor
- Known for: very high resolution photoelectron spectroscopy in understanding the physics of metal-insulator transition, charge density wave and Kondo systems.
- Awards: Shanti Swarup Bhatnagar Prize for Science and Technology
- Website: Official website
- Scientific career
- Fields: Physics

Kalobaran Maiti (born 21 October 1967) is an Indian physicist specialising in condensed matter physics and materials science. He obtained his MSc degree from Rajabazar Science College and PhD degree from Indian Institute of Science, Bangalore. He was awarded the Shanti Swarup Bhatnagar Prize for Science and Technology in 2010, the highest science award in India, in the physical sciences category for his contribution in the field of very high resolution photoelectron spectroscopy in understanding the physics of metal-insulator transition, charge density wave and Kondo systems. He is also a Fellow of the National Academy of Sciences, Indian Academy of Sciences and the Indian National Science Academy.

He is a Professor of Condensed Matter Physics and Materials Science at Tata Institute of Fundamental Research, Mumbai (TIFR). At TIFR, Maiti has built an electron spectrometer that can measure the energy of electrons with very high accuracy. He was appointed as the Director of the Indian Association for the Cultivation of Science, Kolkata on 19 March 2025.
