= Francis D'Souza (chemist) =

American chemist

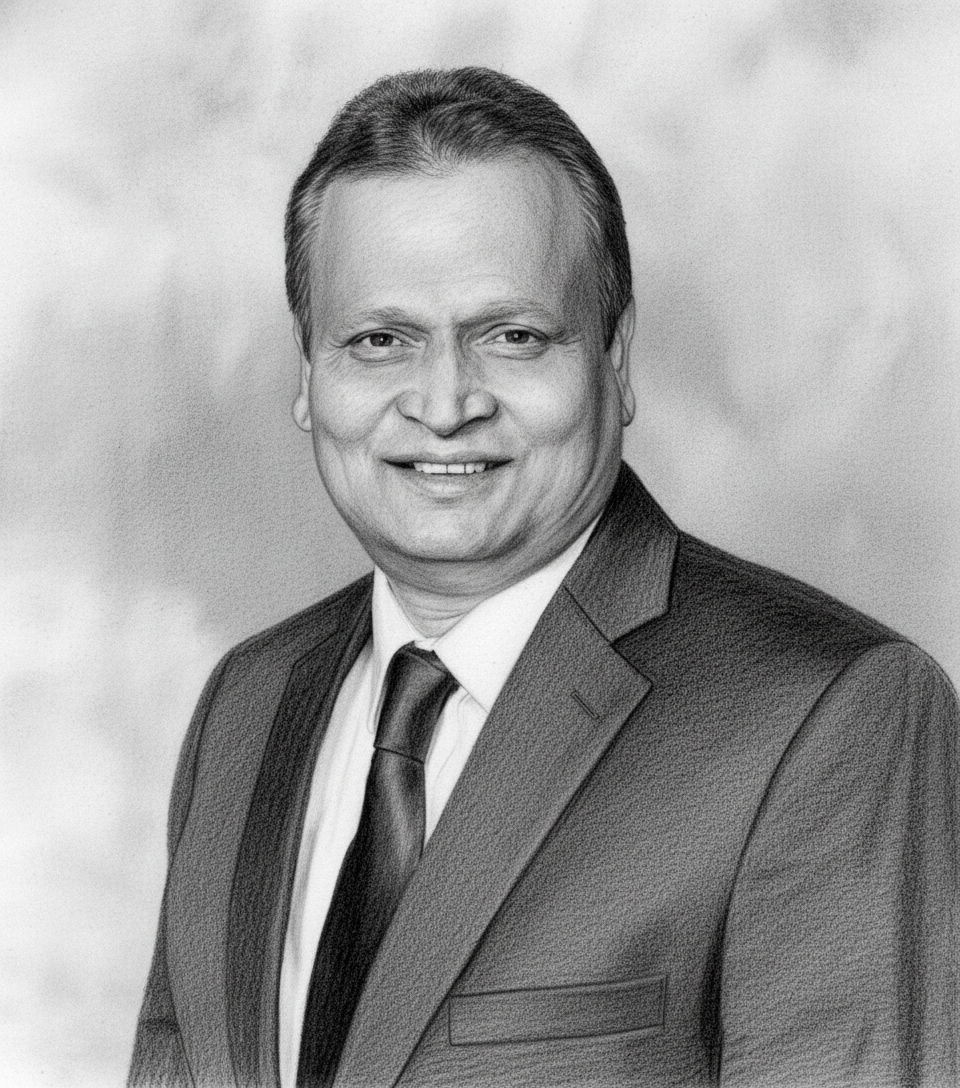
- Education: University of Mysore; Indian Institute of Science
- Scientific career
- Fields: Chemistry, materials science, electrochemistry, photochemistry
- Workplaces: University of North Texas

Francis D'Souza FRSC is a chemist and academic. He is a Regents Professor of chemistry and materials science and engineering and a UNT Foundation Eminent Faculty Scholar at the University of North Texas (UNT). In 2026, he became president of The Electrochemical Society.

== Career ==
In 2011, D'Souza joined the University of North Texas as a professor of chemistry and materials science and engineering. He was named a University Distinguished Research Professor in 2013 and a Regents Professor in 2021. In 2025, he was appointed a UNT Foundation Eminent Faculty Scholar.

In 2026, D'Souza became president of The Electrochemical Society for the 2026–2027 term.

== Awards and recognition ==
- 2008 – Fellow of the Japan Society for the Promotion of Science
- 2010 – Fellow of The Electrochemical Society
- 2013 – University Distinguished Research Professor, University of North Texas
- 2015 – Fellow of the Royal Society of Chemistry
- 2018 – Fulbright Specialist
- 2018 – Doherty Research Award, Dallas–Fort Worth Section of the American Chemical Society
- 2021 – Regents Professor, University of North Texas
- 2021 – Medal of the Chemical Research Society of India
- 2022 – Research Leadership Award, University of North Texas
- 2023 – Nanocarbons Division Robert C. Haddon Research Award, The Electrochemical Society
- 2025 – UNT Foundation Eminent Faculty Award
- 2026 – Hans Fischer Career Award for lifetime achievement in porphyrin chemistry, Society of Porphyrins and Phthalocyanines
