= Krishnendu =

Krishnendu is an Indian masculine given name. Notable people with the name include:

- Krishnendu Adhikari (born 1982), Indian actor and director
- Krishnendu Chakrabarty, Indian-American engineer
- Krishnendu Chatterjee (born 1978), Indian computer scientist
- Krishnendu Narayan Choudhury (born 1957), Indian advocate and politician
- Krishnendu Paul (born 1973), Indian politician
- Krishnendu Roy, Indian footballer
- Krishnendu Sengupta (born 1970), Indian professor
