= Deb Shankar Ray =

Indian physical chemist and professor

- Born: 2 January 1954 (age 72); West Bengal, India
- Education: Rajabazar Science College (University of Calcutta)
- Known for: Studies on non-linear dynamics and spectroscopy
- Awards: 1984 INSA Young Scientist Award; 1999 Shanti Swarup Bhatnagar Prize
- Scientific career
- Fields: Physical chemistry
- Workplaces: Jadavpur University; Indian Association for the Cultivation of Science; Rajabazar Science College; Calcutta University; Vidyasagar University
- Doctoral advisor: Mihir Chowdhury

Deb Shankar Ray (born 2 January 1954) is an Indian physical chemist and professor at the department of physical chemistry of the Indian Association for the Cultivation of Science, Kolkata. He is known for his research on non-linear dynamics and theoretical spectroscopy and is an elected fellow of the Indian National Science Academy, West Bengal Academy of Science and Technology, and the Indian Academy of Sciences. The Council of Scientific and Industrial Research, the apex agency of the Government of India for scientific research, awarded him the Shanti Swarup Bhatnagar Prize for Science and Technology, one of the highest Indian science awards, in 1999, for his contributions to chemical sciences.

== Biography ==
D. S. Ray was born on 2 January 1954 in the Indian state of West Bengal. After securing a PhD from the Rajabazar Science College, Calcutta University for his thesis on Time resolved spectroscopy, he started his career as a lecturer at Jadavpur University in 1984. He worked at the university for two years when he was appointed as a senior lecturer at the Indian Association for the Cultivation of Science in 1986 where he spent the rest of his career. During this period, he held various positions such as that of a reader (1991–97), professor (1997–2002), head of the department (2002–05), senior professor (2005–09) and dean of academics (2009–10). He also serves as an honorary faculty member at the University of Calcutta and Vidyasagar University.

== Legacy ==
Ray is known to have done extensive research on theoretical spectroscopy and nonlinear dynamics. He is also known to be an inspiring teacher. His later research at the Indian Association for the Cultivation of Science was focused on spin bath processes on which he has written numerous articles. His research has been published in one book, Quantum Brownian Motion in C-Numbers: Theory And Applications, also as chapters in books authored by other authors as well as several peer-reviewed scientific articles. Google Scholar, an online repository of science articles, has listed 181 of these. He has mentored several doctoral scholars in their studies and is a member of the national organizing committee of the Conference on Nonlinear Systems and Dynamics (CNSD).

== Awards and honors ==
Ray, a national scholarship holder during 1970–73, received the Young Scientist Award of the Indian National Science Academy in 1984. The Council of Scientific and Industrial Research awarded him the Shanti Swarup Bhatnagar Prize, one of the highest Indian science awards, in 1999. He was elected by the Indian Academy of Sciences as their fellow in 1995. and he became an elected fellow of the Indian National Science Academy in 2014. He is also an elected fellow of the West Bengal Academy of Sciences. He was the Acting Director of IACS, Kolkata from 2013 to 2015.

== See also ==
- Spectroscopy
- Nonlinear system
