= Kessar =

Kessar is a trade name for the drug tamoxifen. It may also refer to:

- Naveeta Kessar, producer of Indian comedy television series Bajega Band Baaja
- Radha Kessar, Indian mathematician
- Satinder Vir Kessar (born 1932), Indian chemist
- Yisrael Kessar (born 1931), Israeli politician
