= Samaresh Bhattacharya =

Indian chemist and professor (born 1960)

- Born: 24 August 1960 (age 66); West Bengal, India
- Education: Jadavpur University; Indian Association for the Cultivation of Science
- Known for: Studies on the Platinum Group Metals
- Awards: 2005 Shanti Swarup Bhatnagar Prize; 2006 CRSI Bronze Medal
- Scientific career
- Fields: Inorganic chemistry; Organometallic chemistry
- Workplaces: Jadavpur University

Samaresh Bhattacharya (born 1960) is an Indian inorganic and organometallic chemist and a professor of the department of chemistry at Jadavpur University. He also serves as a dean of the faculty of science at the university. He is known for his studies on the coordination compounds of the Platinum Group Metals with regard to their use in the activation of organic molecules. He is an elected fellow of the Indian Academy of Sciences and the West Bengal Academy of Science and Technology. The Council of Scientific and Industrial Research, the apex agency of the Government of India for scientific research, awarded him the Shanti Swarup Bhatnagar Prize for Science and Technology, one of the highest Indian science awards, in 2005, for his contributions to chemical sciences.

== Biography ==
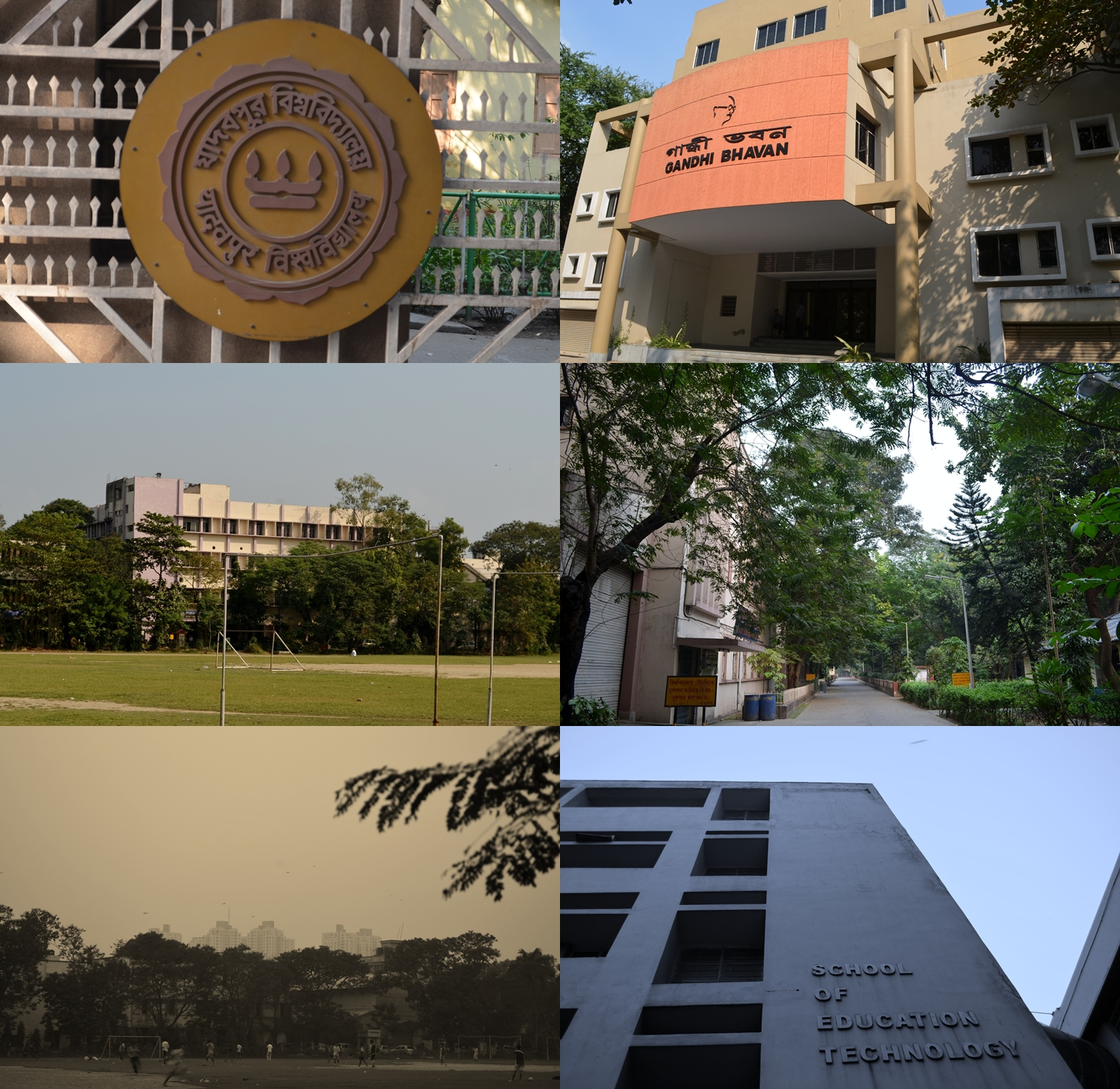
Jadavpur University

Samaresh Bhattacharya, born on 24 August 1960 in the Indian state of West Bengal, did his graduate studies at Jadavpur University. After passing his BSc in chemistry in 1978, he continued at the institution to complete his master's degree in 1980. His doctoral studies were at the Indian Association for the Cultivation of Science (IACS) from where he secured a PhD in 1986 and joined Jadavpur University as a faculty at the department of chemistry. He has been serving the institution ever since and is a professor of inorganic chemistry and the dean of faculty of science.

== Legacy and honors ==
Bhattacharya's research has been focused on the Platinum Group of Metals comprising ruthenium, rhodium, palladium, osmium, iridium, and platinum and he has studied their uses in activating organic molecules. He has documented his research in several peer-reviewed articles; ResearchGate, an online repository of scientific articles has listed 137 of them. He is on the Subject Expert Committee for Chemical Sciences of the Fund for Improvement of S&T Infrastructure in Universities and other Higher Educational Institutions (FIST Program) constituted by the Department of Science and Technology. He was a guest editor of the Special Issue Dedicated to Acharya P. C. Ray published by the Indian Journal of Chemistry - Sec A in 2011. He is a former member of the Sectional Committee for Chemical Sciences of the Executive Council of West Bengal Academy of Science and Technology during 2012–13. He has participated in several symposiums as an invited speaker and is a member of the National Organizing Committee of the Fifth Symposium on Advanced Biological Inorganic Chemistry (SABIC-2017), organized by the Tata Institute of Fundamental Research and scheduled to be held in January 2017.

The Council of Scientific and Industrial Research awarded him the Shanti Swarup Bhatnagar Prize, one of the highest Indian science awards, in 2005. He received the Bronze Medal of the Chemical Research Society of India in 2006 and he was elected as a fellow by the Indian Academy of Sciences the same year. He is also an elected fellow of the West Bengal Academy of Science and Technology.

== See also ==
- Platinum group
