= Satinder Vir Kessar =

Indian chemist (born 1932)

- Born: 9 June 1932 (age 94); Hoshiarpur, Punjab, India
- Education: DAV Senior Secondary School; Indian Military Academy; Panjab University; University of Southern California
- Known for: Studies on steroidal and heterocyclic chemistry
- Awards: 1972 Shanti Swarup Bhatnagar Prize; Hari Om Award; 1991 Jawaharlal Nehru National Science Award; UoK Goyal Prize; 1992 INSA Golden Jubilee Commemoration Medal; 1996 INSA Meghnad Saha Medal; CRSI Gold Medal; ICS Lifetime Achievement Award; 2008 Indian Science Congress Association Award; Prem Singh Medal; CRSI Gold Medal
- Scientific career
- Fields: Synthetic organic chemistry
- Workplaces: PEC University of Technology; Panjab University
- Doctoral advisor: S.M. Mukherji; M. C. Kloetzel; S. W. Benson

Satinder Vir Kessar (born 9 June 1932) is an Indian synthetic organic chemist, academic and an Emeritus professor of Panjab University. He is known for his researches in steroidal and heterocyclic chemistry. He is an elected fellow of The World Academy of Sciences and all the three major Indian science academies, viz. The Indian National Science Academy, the Indian Academy of Sciences and the National Academy of Sciences, India. The Council of Scientific and Industrial Research, the apex agency of the Government of India for scientific research, awarded him the Shanti Swarup Bhatnagar Prize for Science and Technology, one of the highest Indian science awards, in 1972, for his contributions to chemical sciences.

== Biography ==
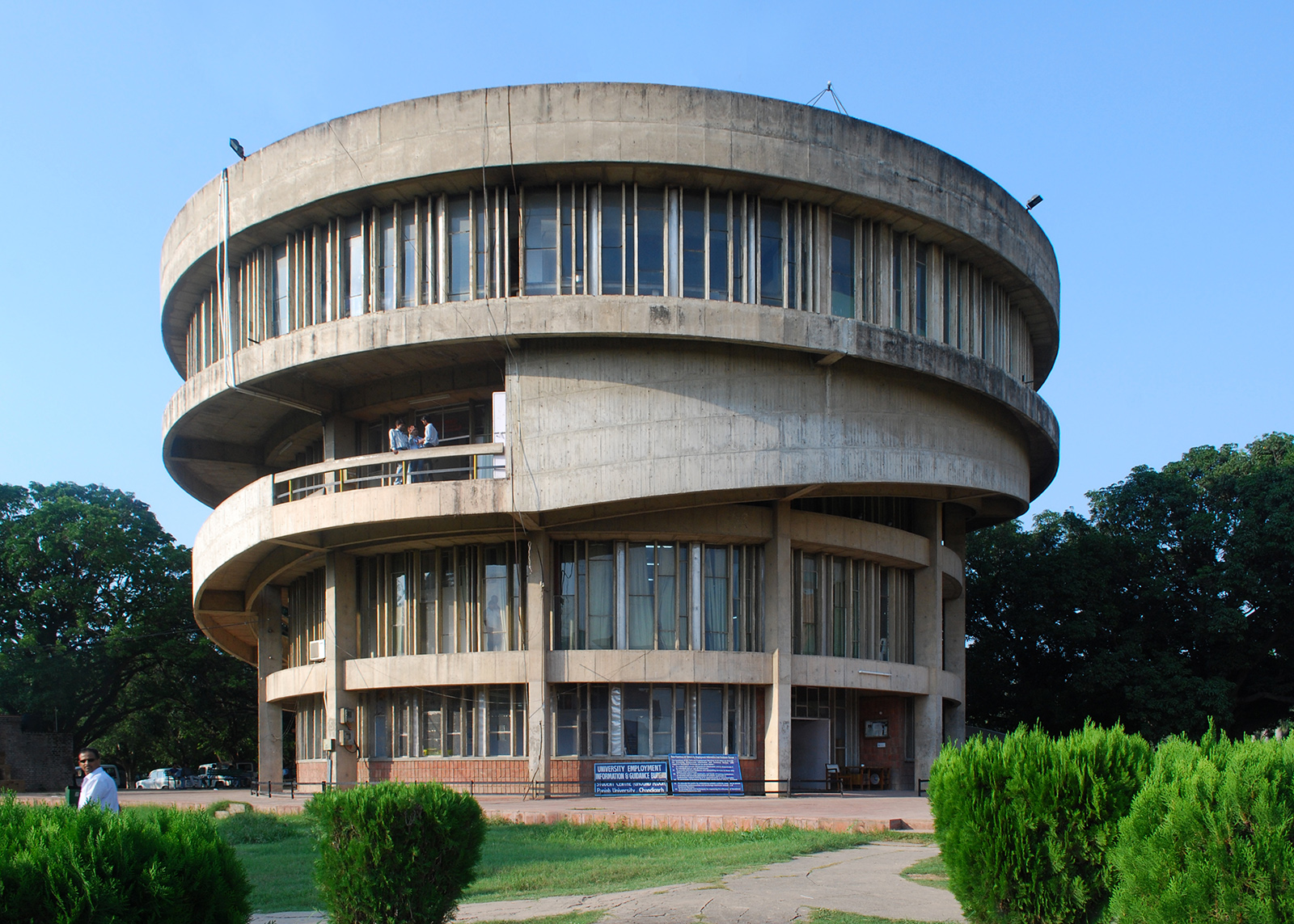
Student Centre, Panjab University.

S. V. Kessar was born in Hoshiarpur, in the undivided Punjab of British India on 9 June 1932 to Durga Dass, a lawyer and his homemaker wife, Susheela Devi. His schooling was at DAV Senior Secondary School, Hoshiarpur and later at Indian Military Academy after which he graduated in chemistry from Panjab University in 1953. While continuing his studies at the same institution for MSc by research, (Note: His adviser for master's degree was S. M. Mukherji) he appeared for the Civil Services Examination in 1953 and stood among the top 100 candidates. Choosing to pursue a career in chemistry, he passed MSc (hons) and moved to the US to join the University of Southern California where he studied under the guidance of M. C. Kloetzel to secure a PhD in 1958. He stayed in the US for a while more to complete his post-doctoral studies at the laboratory of S. W. Benson and returned to India to start his career as an assistant professor at PEC University of Technology (then known as Punjab Engineering College). Returning to his alma mater, Panjab University in 1959 as a lecturer, he spent the rest of his academic career there where he served as a Reader (from 1963) and as a Professor (from 1974). On his superannuation from service, he was made the Emeritus Professor of the university. In between, he also served as a CSIR Distinguished Chair from 1992 to 1997, the first professor to hold the position.

Kessar is married to Urmi, his colleague at Panjab University and an art historian and they have two daughters, Bindu and Radha. The couple lives in Chandigarh.

== Legacy ==
Kessar's days with S. M. Mukherji during his master's degree research produced the first of his several articles, A Novel Synthesis of 4-Methyl-1 : 2-Benzanthracene which was published in Nature in 1954. Later, he worked on the synthesis of pyrrolines which earned him his doctoral degree in 1958. Through his later day researches, he built the infrastructure of solanum alkaloids, accomplished the synthesis of azasteroids using a new pathway, and developed a protocol for linking aromatic rings which he utilized for the synthesis of the phenanthridine ring system and other heterocyclic systems as well as the synthesis of aporphine and related alkaloids. Among the other natural products and drugs he synthesized include steroidal sapogenins, phenanthridine, aporphine, quinculidine, dextrorphan and venlafaxine. He also elucidated the mechanistic pathways of the transformations and developed methodologies for benzyne cyclisation of anils and Lewis acid- promoted lithiation, both have since become standard synthetic procedures.

Kessar has authored several articles detailing his research findings which have been published in peer-reviewed journals. (Note: Please see Selected bibliography section) He holds patent for one of the processes he has developed. He served the executive council of Panjab University Alumni Association during 2014–15 and has written a book on the city of Jaisalmer. He also serves a member of the councils of the National Academy of Sciences, India and the Indian National Science Academy (INSA) and was the vice president of INSA Council during 1993–94.

== Awards and honors ==
Besides being a National Fellow of the University Grants Commission of India (1976–78) and an elected fellow of The World Academy of Sciences (1998), Kessar is an elected fellow of the National Academy of Sciences, India,(1996), Indian National Science Academy (1977) and the Indian Academy of Sciences (1975) and an honorary fellow of the Punjab Academy of Sciences. The Council of Scientific and Industrial Research awarded him the Shanti Swarup Bhatnagar Prize, one of the highest Indian science awards, in 1972. Madhya Pradesh Council of Science and Technology awarded him the Jawaharlal Nehru National Science Award in 1991 and he received the Golden Jubilee Commemoration Medal of the Indian National Science Academy in 1992; INSA would honor him again in 1996 with the Meghnad Saha Medal. The Association Award of the Indian Science Congress reached him in 2008 as well as the Lifetime Achievement Award of the Indian Chemical Society and he has delivered the Basudev Banerjee Memorial Lecture of the society. He is also a recipient of the Prem Singh Medal, Gold Medal of Chemical Research Society of India, Hari Om Award and the Goyal Prize of the Kurukshetra University. Arkivoc journal issued a festschrift on Kessar in 2005 on his 70th anniversary year by way of its December issue.

== Patents ==
- Satinder Vir Kessar; Shrinivas Krishnarao Kulkarni; Rajesh Jain; Sanjay Trehan; Sitaram Kumar Magadi; Jagattaran Das; Gurmeet Kaur; Kamal Nain Singh; Sneh Lata; Ashish Dhir (28 October 2010). "Novel monoamine re-uptake inhibitor". Patent No. WO 2009118765 A3.

== Selected bibliography ==
- Vig, O. P.; Kessar, S. V.; Mukherji, S. M. (October 1954). "A Novel Synthesis of 4-Methyl-1 : 2-Benzanthracene". Nature. 174 (834): 834. Bibcode:1954Natur.174..834V. doi:10.1038/174834a0. S2CID 4181618.
- Kessar, Satinder; Kloetzal, Milton C. (1962). "Heterocyclic Compounds. X. Hydrogenated Derivatives of Isoindole and 2-Azaazulene from Reductive Cyclization of γ-Nitro Ketones". The Journal of Organic Chemistry. 27 (4): 1314–1317. doi:10.1021/jo01051a046.
- Satinder V. Kessar (1978). "A novel route to condensed polynuclear systems; reality and illusion of benzyne intermediacy". Acc. Chem. Res. 11 (7): 283–288. doi:10.1021/ar50127a005.
- Kessar Satinder V.; Gupta Yash P.; Balakrishnan Prasanna; Sawal Kewal K.; Mohammad Taj; Dutt Mahesh (1988). "Benzyne cyclization route to benzo[c]phenanthridine alkaloids. Synthesis of chelerythrine, decarine, and nitidine". Journal of Organic Chemistry. 53 (8): 1708–1713. doi:10.1021/jo00243a020.
- Satinder V. Kessar; Paramjit Singh; Rahul Vohra; Nachhattar Pal Kaur; Kamal Nain Singh (1991). "Lewis acid complexed heteroatom carbanions; a new concept for α-metallation of tertiary amines". J. Chem. Soc., Chem. Commun. (8): 568–570. doi:10.1039/C39910000568.
- Satinder Vir Kessar; Anil K. Singh Mankotia; Gurjeet Gujral (1992). "Photoreactivity of conjugated bichromophoric molecules; photoreaction of o-vinylbenzaldehyde with secondary amines". J. Chem. Soc. Chem. Commun. (11): 840–841. doi:10.1039/C39920000840.
- Kessar Satinder V., Singh Paramjit (1997). "Lewis acid complexation of tertiary amines and related compounds: a strategy for α-deprotonation and stereocontrol". Chemical Reviews. 97 (3): 721–738. doi:10.1021/cr950082n. PMID 11848886.

== See also ==
- Azasteroid
- Aporphine
- Heterocyclic compound
