= Mihir Chowdhury =

Indian scientist

- Born: 15 July 1937; Dacca, Bengal Presidency, British Raj
- Died: 28 March 2017 (aged 79); Kolkata, West Bengal, India
- Education: Rajabazar Science College (University of Calcutta); Pennsylvania State University; University of Chicago
- Known for: Studies on Optical, magneto-optical and quantum-mechanical studies on electronic structure of molecules
- Awards: 1977 Shanti Swarup Bhatnagar Prize; 2000 CRSI Silver Medal; 2000 ISRAPS Lifetime Achievement Award; 2005 Calcutta University Eminent Teacher Award; 2006 ICS Lifetime Achievement Award; 2007 CRSI Gold Medal
- Scientific career
- Fields: Physical chemistry
- Workplaces: Indian Association for the Cultivation of Science; Presidency University, Kolkata
- Doctoral advisor: Sadhan Basu

Mihir Chowdhury FNA, FASc (15 July 1937 – 28 March 2017) was an Indian physical chemist and Professor and Head of Department of Chemistry at Presidency College, Kolkata and at the Department of Physical Chemistry of the Indian Association for the Cultivation of Science (IACS). He is known for his studies on the electronic structure of molecules using optical, magneto-optical and quantum-mechanical methods. He was an elected fellow of the Indian National Science Academy and the Indian Academy of Sciences. The Council of Scientific and Industrial Research, the apex agency of the Government of India for scientific research, awarded him the Shanti Swarup Bhatnagar Prize for Science and Technology, one of the highest Indian science awards, in 1977, for his contributions to chemical sciences. Three of his research students were also Shanti Swarup Bhatnager awardees.

== Biography ==
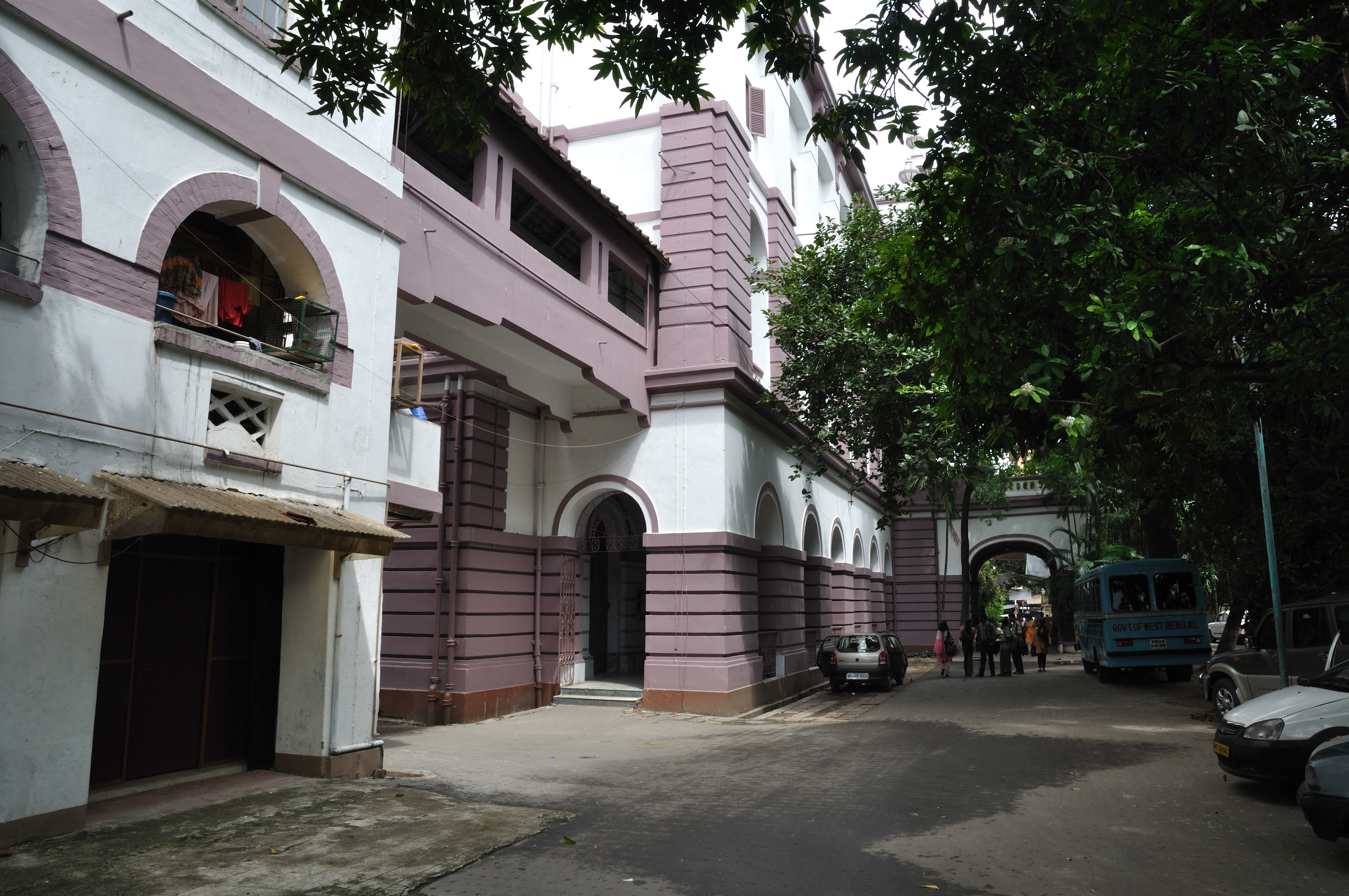
Presidency University, Kolkata

Chowdhury was born in Dhaka of British India (presently in Bangladesh) to Prof. Jogendra Kumar Chowdhury, a chemistry professor at Dacca University and Indira Chowdhury (nee' Guhathakurta), graduated in chemistry from Calcutta University in 1955 and completed his master's degree in 1957 from the Rajabazar Science College, Calcutta University. Enrolling for his doctoral research under the guidance of the renowned chemist and Shanti Swarup Bhatnagar laureate, Sadhan Basu, he secured a PhD and moved to the US for his post-doctoral research which lasted three years, working at the Pennsylvania State University during 1961–62 and at the University of Chicago from 1962 to 1964. On his return to India the same year, he started his career as a pool officer at Indian Association for the Cultivation of Science (IACS) and stayed there till 1966 when he joined Presidency College, Kolkata (the present-day Presidency University) as a faculty of the department of chemistry. He served the college for over a decade as a professor of chemistry.

It was during this time, he was caught between a student unrest in the college and had to suffer manhandling by a section of the agitating students. The incident resulted in his absence from the college for almost a year and subsequent resignation from the college. He was the head of the department of chemistry at Presidency College when he left the institution to return to Indian Association for the Cultivation of Science as a professor in 1966 and when he superannuated in 1998, he had served IACS as the head of the department of physical chemistry since 1976. Post retirement, he served as a senior scientist of the Indian National Science Academy, a position he held till 2006. He also continued his association with the post graduate teaching programs of Calcutta University and Presidency College on honorary basis.

Chowdhury's wife Sunanda Chowdhury taught at Muralidhar Girls' College. Their Son, Arindam is a professor at IIT, Bombay and daughter, Avantika is an economist. His elder sister Prof. Amita Datta is a noted economist who taught at Delhi University, Lady Brabourne and Presidency Colleges, Kolkata. His elder brother Dr. Subir Chowdhury was a director at IIM, Kolkata. The family lives in Kolkata.

== Legacy ==
Using optical, magneto-optical and quantum-mechanical methodologies, Chowdhury studied the electronic structure of molecules and widened the understanding of CT, exciton and parity forbidden transitions of metal complexes, diazines, bimolecules and rare earth complexes. He developed facilities to carry out his spectroscopic and fast kinetic experiments and studied various fields of spectroscopy such as laser, time-resolved and non-linear optics, and elucidated role of spin and magnetic field in the radical pair recombination process, circular dichroism of crystal field split components in cooled single crystals, and laser-induced fluorescence of jet-cooled large organic molecules and their hydrated clusters. His work on the Robert S. Mulliken's conjecture is reported to have assisted him to ratify for the first time that the CT band is polarised along the intermolecular axis.

Chowdhury documented his researches by way of over 155 articles published in peer-reviewed journals. (Note: Please see Selected bibliography section) He was associated with a number of science journals as a member of their editorial boards and guided 30 doctoral scholars in their studies. His involvement in the efforts to popularise science included a series of lectures on topics such as LASER- the wonderful toy, Hundred years of electron discovery, and Symmetry in Chemistry and Physics and his contributions have earned him mention from other authors.

== Awards and honours ==
The Council of Scientific and Industrial Research awarded Chowdhury the Shanti Swarup Bhatnagar Prize, one of the highest Indian science awards, in 1977. He received the Silver Medal of the Chemical Research Society of India as well as the Lifetime Achievement Award and the life membership of the Indian Society for Radiation and Photochemical Sciences in 2000. In 2005, Calcutta University awarded him the Eminent Teacher Award and the next year, he received the Lifetime Achievement Award of the Indian Chemical Society, followed by the Gold Medal of the Chemical Research Society of India, a year later.

Chowdhury was a recipient of honoris causa degrees of Doctor of Science of the Vidyasagar University (2007) and Presidency University (2013). He was a National Lecturer of the University Grants Commission of India in 1980 and the award orations he has delivered include Mitra Memorial Lecture of Delhi University (1988), K. Rangadhama Rao Memorial Lecture of Indian National Science Academy (1989), J. C. Ghosh Memorial Lecture of Indian Chemical Society (1997), Morris Travers Memorial Lecture of the Indian Institute of Science (1998), Baba Kartar Singh Memorial Lecture of Panjab University (1999), Sadhan Basu Memorial Lecture of Indian National Science Academy (2002) and the Mizushima-Raman Lectures in Japan (2003). The Indian Academy of Sciences elected him as a fellow in 1977 before he became a fellow of the Indian National Science Academy in 1980.

== Selected bibliography ==
- Mihir Chowdhury, Sadhan Basu (1961). "Nature of Intermolecular Forces in Quinhydrone". INSA. 27.
- Mihir Chowdhury, Sadhan Basu (1960). "Some Notes on Molecular Complexes between Iodine and Polynuclear Aromatic Hydrocarbons". J. Chem. Phys. 32 (1450): a. Bibcode:1960JChPh..32.1450C. doi:10.1063/1.1730939.
- Samita Basu; Liudmila Kundu; Mihir Chowdhury (1987). "The influence of trivalent lanthanide ions on the magnetic field effect of pyrene-dimethylaniline exciplex luminescence". Chemical Physics Letters. 141 (1–2): 115–118. Bibcode:1987CPL...141..115B. doi:10.1016/0009-2614(87)80102-1.
- Tapanendu Kundu; Asok K. Banerjee; Mihir Chowdhury (1990). "Two-photon spectra of single-crystal gadolinium diglycolate". Phys. Rev. B. 41 (10911): 10911–10922. Bibcode:1990PhRvB..4110911K. doi:10.1103/PhysRevB.41.10911. PMID 9993510.
- Tapanendu Kundu; Asok K. Banerjee; Mihir Chowdhury (1991). "Erratum: Two-photon spectra of single-crystal gadolinium diglycolate". Phys. Rev. B. 44 (7769): 7769. doi:10.1103/PhysRevB.44.7769. PMID 9998706.
- Mihir Chowdhury (1996). "Selection Rules For Processes Involving Photon-Molecule Interaction: A Symmetry-Conservation-Based Approach Bypassing Transition Matrix Elements". J. Chem. Educ. 73 (8): 743. Bibcode:1996JChEd..73..743C. doi:10.1021/ed073p743.

== See also ==
- Sadhan Basu
- Robert S. Mulliken
