= Kankan Bhattacharyya =

Indian scientist

Kankan Bhattacharyya was a modern non-linear laser spectroscopy scientist. His main interest was in femtosecond dynamics in nano-confined systems that include biological assemblies. His primary discovery was the ultraslow nature of biological water.

He was the director and chair professor of Indian Association for the Cultivation of Science (IACS), Kolkata, the oldest centre for scientific research in Asia. He was a fellow of all of the national science academies of India and a senior editor of The Journal of Physical Chemistry. He has received awards from many countries; most notably, the Shanti Swarup Bhatnagar Award in Chemical Science from the (CSIR, India) in 1997 and the TWAS Prize in 2007.

He graduated from Presidency College under Calcutta University, and achieved his master's at Rajabazar Science College, Calcutta University. He did his doctoral research under the supervision of Professor Mihir Chowdhury, an eminent scientist in the field of molecular spectroscopy and photochemistry at IACS (1984).

He was a visiting professor at Department of Chemistry, Indian Institute of Science Education and Research, Bhopal

He was diagnosed with colorectal cancer and died on 10 November 2022 at Tata Medical Centre, Kolkata, at 68 years old, due to the disease.
