= Renu Swarup =

Indian Scientist

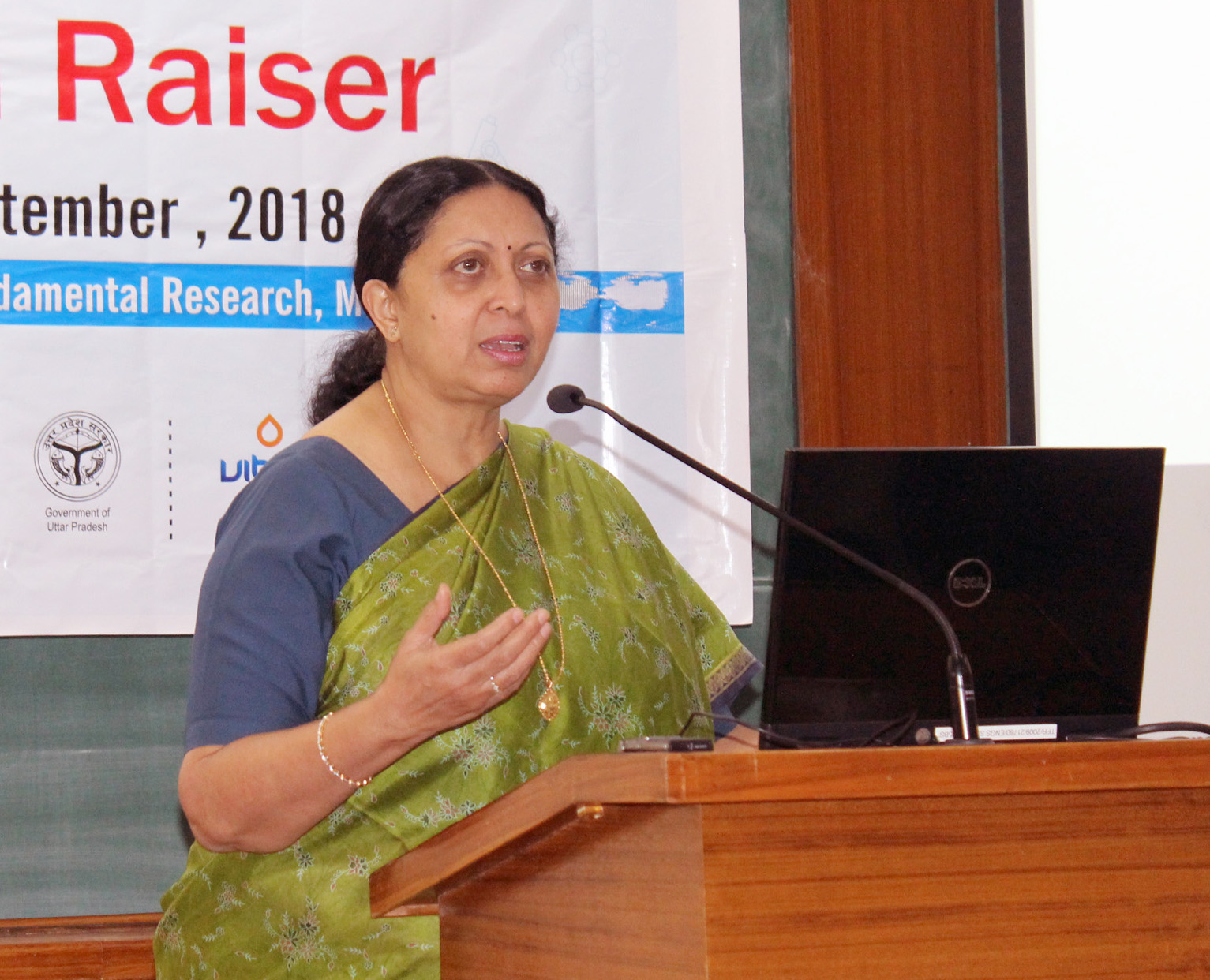

Chairperson, Biotechnology Industry Research Assistance Council (BIRAC)
- Preceded by: K. VijayRaghavan

Secretary, Department of Biotechnology Ministry of Science & Technology, Government of India
- In office April 10, 2018 – October 31, 2021
- Preceded by: Ashutosh Sharma
- Succeeded by: Rajesh Sudhir Gokhale
- Scientific career
- Education: John Innes Centre Norwich, UK
- Awards: BioSpectrum Person of the Year (2012); National Entrepreneurship Award (2017); TWAS Regional Prize in Science Diplomacy (2018); Newly discovered microbial species Natrialba swarupiae, named in her honour (2020)
- Fields: Genetics; Plant Breeding; Biotechnology; Science Policy

Dr. Renu Swarup is an Indian geneticist and former Secretary, Government of India, formerly heading the Department of Biotechnology (DBT), Ministry of Science and Technology. She has actively contributed in the formulation of India's Biotechnology Vision and Strategy. She is credited with the establishment of India's largest microbial resource centre, Microbial Culture Collection.

To acknowledge her support in microbial diversity research in India and simplifying provisions of the Biological diversity Act, 2002, a newly discovered microbial species Natrialba swarupiae has been named in her honour by the National Centre for Cell Science.

In addition to her current role, she holds the position of chairperson, Biotechnology Industry Research Assistance Council (BIRAC), a Public Sector Company incorporated by the Government of India to promote research and innovation in the Biotech Enterprise with special focus on Start-Ups and SMEs.

== Education ==
Swarup earned her PhD in the field of Genetics and Plant Breeding. She did her Post-Doctoral work with the Commonwealth Scholarship in the lab of Professor Roy Davies at the John Innes Centre, Norwich, UK. In 1989 she returned to India and took up the assignment of a Science Manager in the Department of Biotechnology.

== Career ==
Renu Swarup has served in the Department of Biotechnology for nearly 29 years. She was the Senior Advisor and Scientist- H at DBT before taking over as Secretary to Government of India on April 10, 2018.

At the Department of Biotechnology, Swarup has overseen national programmes on Bioresource development and utilization, spatial characterisation of biodiversity, second generation bioethanol and drugs from microbes and the National Biopharma Mission.

She was instrumental in formulation of the Biotechnology Vision in 2001, National Biotechnology Development Strategy in 2007 and Strategy II, 2015–20 as the Member Secretary of the Expert Committee.

Swarup is a fellow of the National Academy of Sciences, India (NASI) and a life member of the Trust for Advancement of Agricultural Sciences(TAAS). She also serves on the Board Of Management of Sri Sathya Sai Institute of Higher Learning (Deemed university) in Andhra Pradesh, India.

She has been a supporter of women scientists and has been involved in several initiatives that encourage participation of women in scientific and technological research. She initiated a DBT scheme called Biotechnology Career Advancement for Women Scientists (BioCARe). She was a member of the task force on Women in Science, constituted by the Scientific Advisory Committee to the Prime Minister. She is also a member of the Organisation for Women in Science for the Developing World.

Under her leadership, the Department Of Biotechnology played a key role in developing technological solutions for COVID-19 in India.

== Awards and honors ==
- BioSpectrum Person of the Year Award (2012)
- National Entrepreneurship Award (2017)
- TiE Delhi-NCR WomENABLER Award (2018)
- Dr. P. Sheel Memorial Lecture Award by NASI (2018)
- TWAS Regional Prize in Science Diplomacy (2018)
- National Academy of Sciences, India Fellowship Science and Society (2018)
- Agriculture Research Leadership Award (2019)
- BW Most Influential Woman Of India (2019)
- A newly discovered microbial species Natrialba swarupiae, has been named in her honour (2020).
