= Ranjan Sen =

Indian biophysicist

- Born: 1967 (age 58–59); West Bengal, India
- Education: University of Calcutta; Saha Institute of Nuclear Physics; National Institute of Genetics; National Institutes of Health
- Known for: Studies on prokaryotic transcription
- Awards: 2007 N-BIOS Prize
- Scientific career
- Fields: Biophysics
- Workplaces: Centre for DNA Fingerprinting and Diagnostics; Indian Association for the Cultivation of Science
- Doctoral advisor: Dipak Dasgupta; Robert Weisberg

Ranjan Sen (born 1967) is an Indian microbiologist, biophysicist and a senior scientist as well as the head of the Laboratory of Transcription at the Centre for DNA Fingerprinting and Diagnostics. Known for his studies in the field of prokaryotic transcription, Sen is an elected fellow of the Indian National Science Academy and the National Academy of Sciences, India. The Department of Biotechnology of the Government of India awarded him the National Bioscience Award for Career Development, one of the highest Indian science awards, for his contributions to biosciences in 2007.

== Biography ==
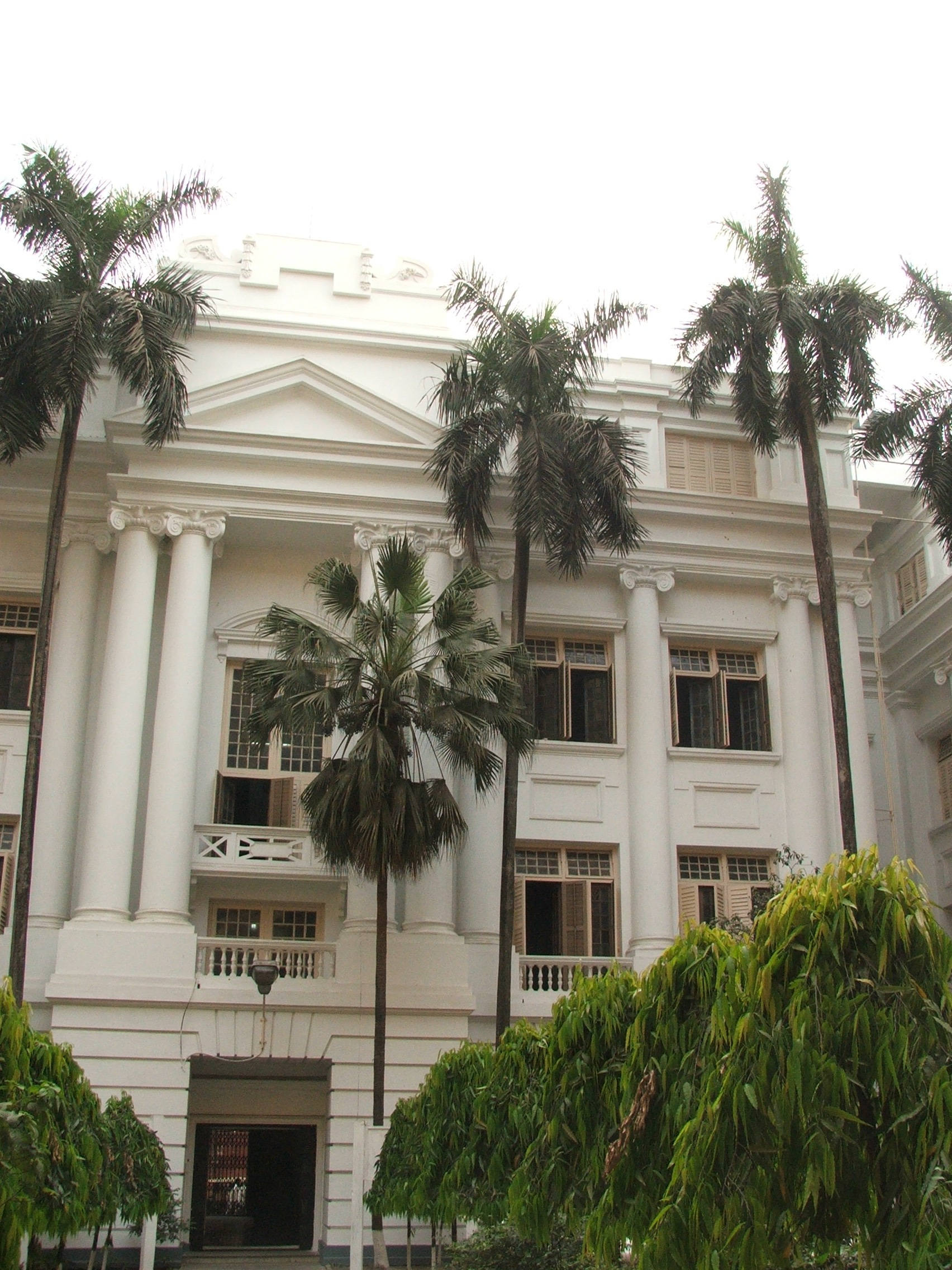
University of Calcutta

Ranjan Sen, born in 1967 in the Indian state of West Bengal, earned the post-graduate degree of MSc in molecular biology and biophysics in 1991 from the University of Calcutta and did his doctoral studies on the conformational changes of E.coli RNA polymerase during transcription initiation under the guidance of Dipak Dasgupta at the Saha Institute of Nuclear Physics to secure a PhD in 1996. His post-doctoral work was, first at the laboratory of Nobuo Shimamoto of the National Institute of Genetics during 1995–98 and later, with Robert Weisberg at the National Institutes of Health during 1998–2001. On his return to India in 2002, he joined the Centre for DNA Fingerprinting and Diagnostics (CDFD) as a scientist. He continues at the institution, holding the position of a scientist grade IV and heads the Lab of Transcription where he hosts several scientists and scholars. He also serves as the director-in-charge of CDFD.

During his post-doctoral days in Japan, Sen worked on the kinetics of abortive transcription in prokaryotes and proposed the concept of branched pathway during transcription initiation process. While in the US, he furthered his work by focusing on transcription antitermination mechanisms by PUT RNA. At CDFD, the team led by him is involved in the studies of antitermination in prokaryotes, combining physical, chemical, biological and genetic techniques. His studies have been documented by way of a number of articles (Note: Please see Selected bibliography section) and ResearchGate, an online repository of scientific articles has listed 60 of them. He is also a member of the Task Force on Biotechnology set up by the Science and Engineering Research Board of the Department of Science and Technology.

== Awards and honors ==
The Department of Biotechnology of the Government of India awarded him the National Bioscience Award for Career Development, one of the highest Indian science awards in 2007 the same year as he was elected as a member of the Guha Research Conference. The National Academy of Sciences, India elected him as a fellow in 2011 and he received the elected fellowship of the Indian National Science Academy in 2017. He is also a recipient of several research fellowships which included GRIP Grant of the National Institutes of Health (2002), Senior Research Fellowship of Wellcome Trust (2003) and the Swarnajayanti Fellowship of the Department of Science and Technology (2006).

== Selected bibliography ==
- Chalissery, Jisha; Banerjee, Sharmistha; Bandey, Irfan; Sen, Ranjan (2007). "Transcription Termination Defective Mutants of Rho: Role of Different Functions of Rho in Releasing RNA from the Elongation Complex". Journal of Molecular Biology. 371 (4): 855–872. doi:10.1016/j.jmb.2007.06.013. PMC 1950744. PMID 17599352.
- Chalissery, Jisha; Muteeb, Ghazala; Kalarickal, Nisha C.; Mohan, Shalini; Jisha, V.; Sen, Ranjan (2011). "Interaction Surface of the Transcription Terminator Rho Required to Form a Complex with the C-Terminal Domain of the Antiterminator NusG". Journal of Molecular Biology. 405 (1): 49–64. doi:10.1016/j.jmb.2010.10.044. PMID 21040729.
- Cheeran, Anoop; Suganthan, Rajan Babu; Swapna, G.; Bandey, Irfan; Achary, M.Sridhar; Nagarajaram, H.A.; Sen, Ranjan (2005). "Escherichia coli RNA Polymerase Mutations Located Near the Upstream Edge of an RNA:DNA Hybrid and the Beginning of the RNA-exit Channel are Defective for Transcription Antitermination by the N Protein from Lambdoid Phage H-19B". Journal of Molecular Biology. 352 (1): 28–43. doi:10.1016/j.jmb.2005.06.052. PMID 16061258.

== See also ==
- Rho factor
- Escherichia coli
