= Indian Journal of Physics =

Peer-reviewed scientific journal

- Discipline: Physics
- Language: English
- Edited by: Subham Majumdar

Publication details
- History: 1926–present
- Publisher: Springer Science+Business Media on behalf of the Indian Association for the Cultivation of Science
- Frequency: Monthly
- Open access: Hybrid
- Impact factor: 1.947 (2020)

Standard abbreviations
- ISO 4: Indian J. Phys.

Indexing
- ISSN: 0973-1458 (print); 0974-9845 (web)
- LCCN: 2004263057
- OCLC no.: 56895225

Links
- Journal homepage; Indian Journal of Physics (Springer); Online archive; Volumes (1926–1936)

The Indian Journal of Physics is a monthly peer-reviewed scientific journal published by Springer Science+Business Media on behalf of the Indian Association for the Cultivation of Science. It was established in 1926 by C. V. Raman and covers applied physics, experimental physics, and theoretical physics. The editor-in-chief is Subham Majumdar.

== Abstracting and indexing ==
The journal is abstracted and indexed in:

- Web of Science
- Astrophysics Data System
- Scopus
- SPIRES
- INSPIRE-HEP
- Chemical Abstract Service
- International Nuclear Information System
- SCImago Journal Rank
- ProQuest
- OCLC
- International Bibliography of Periodical Literature

According to the Journal Citation Reports, the Indian Journal of Physics had a 2020 impact factor of 1.947.

== See also ==
- Pramana
