= Krishnendu Sengupta =

Indian professor (born 1970)

Krishnendu Sengupta (born 17 April 1970), is a professor of theoretical physics in Indian Association for the Cultivation of Science (IACS), Kolkata, India, who was awarded the Shanti Swarup Bhatnagar Prize for science and technology, the highest science award in India, for the year 2012 in physical science category. Before joining IACS he was a research fellow in Harish Chandra Research Institute, Allahabad, and associate professor in Saha Institute of Nuclear Physics, Kolkata. He received his PhD from University of Maryland at College Park and MSc degree from Indian Institute of Technology, Kharagpur.

His research interests include physics of strong correlations in ultracold atoms, quantum phase transitions, physics of graphene, topological insulators and Weyl semimetals, unconventional superconductivity, and quantum hall effect. In recent years, his main research focus has involved developing theoretical understanding of periodically driven closed quantum systems, with emphasis on phenomena such as topological properties of such driven states, dynamical transitions in these driven systems and possible routes to violation of Eigenstate Thermalization Hypothesis (ETH) in them.

He is a Fellow of Indian Academy of Sciences, National Academy of Sciences, and Indian National Science Academy. He has served as a council member of Asia Pacific Centre for Theoretical Physics. He was adjunct Professor of Tata Institute of Fundamental Research (2012-2015). He has been conferred the J.C. Bose fellowship by SERB in 2022.
