= Santanu Bhattacharya =

Indian chemical biologist (born 1958)

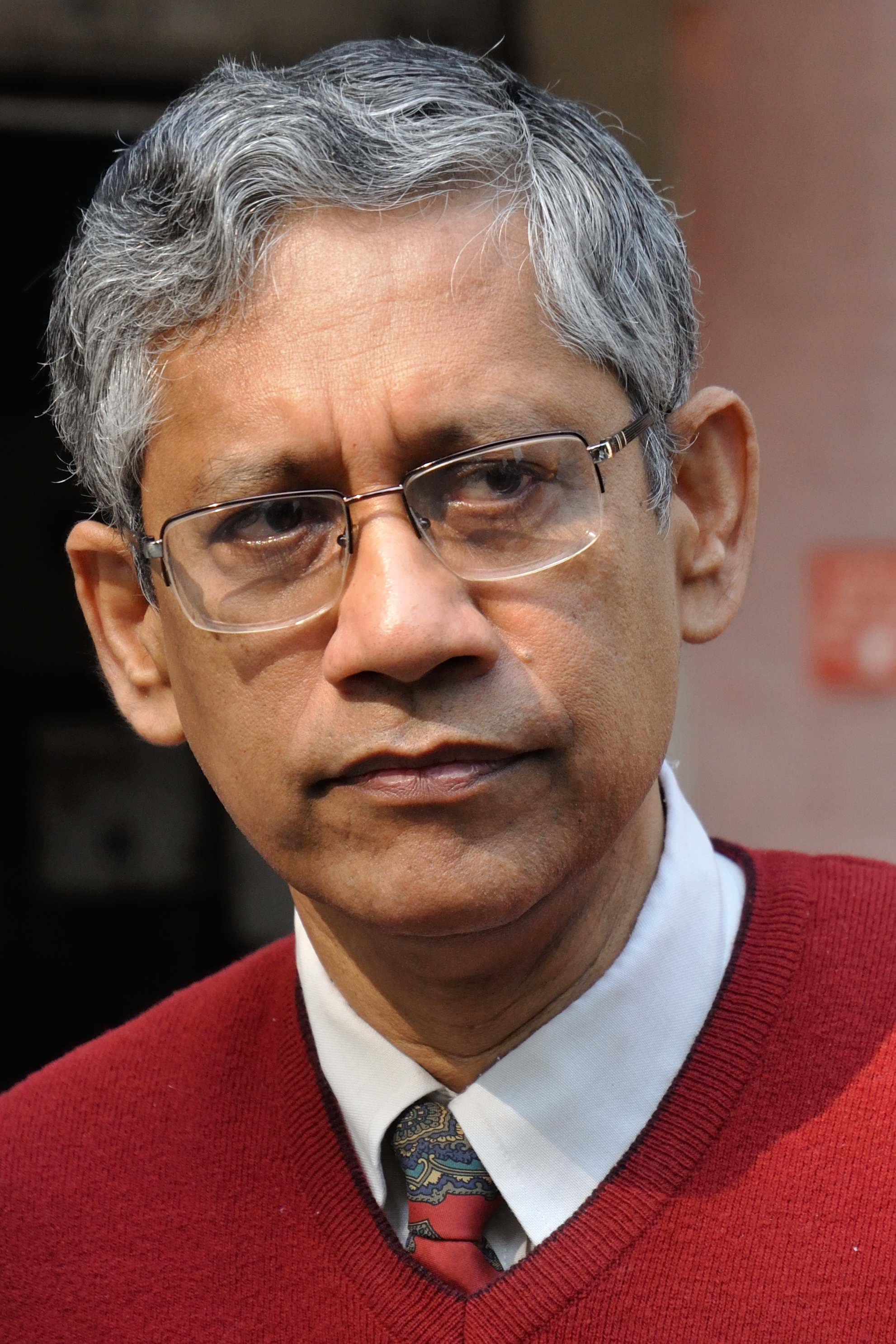
- Bhattacharya in 2015
- Born: 23 April 1958 (age 68); West Bengal, India
- Education: Rajabazar Science College; University of Calcutta; Rutgers University; Massachusetts Institute of Technology
- Known for: Molecular design of natural and synthetic lipids and membranes for gene delivery and synthesis of novel peptides and for sequence-specific DNA recognition. Synthesis of unnatural amino acids, DNA binding small molecules, and biologically active natural products
- Awards: 1997 B. M. Birla Prize; 1999 MRSI Medal; 2002 N-BIOS Prize; 2003 Shanti Swarup Bhatnagar Prize; 2004 PU Bhagyatara National Award; 2004 CDRI Award; 2007 G. D. Birla Award; 2010 TWAS Prize; 2013 Ranbaxy Research Award
- Scientific career
- Fields: Bioorganic chemistry; Supramolecular chemistry
- Workplaces: Indian Institute of Science; Indian Association for the Cultivation of Science Indian Institute of Science Education and Research, Tirupati
- Doctoral advisor: Robert A. Moss; Har Gobind Khorana

Santanu Bhattacharya is an Indian chemist and chemical biologist and an honorary Professor at the Indian Institute of Science (IISc) Bangalore where upon his return from the Massachusetts Institute of Technology (MIT), Cambridge, USA, he joined as an Assistant Professor in 1991 and rose to the rank of a Professor in 2001. He is also an honorary fellow of the Indian Association for the Cultivation of Science (IACS Kolkata) where he served as the Director from 2015-2021. Since 2023, he is the Director of the Indian Institute of Science Education and Research, Tirupati (IISER-Tirupati). He is popular for his interdisciplinary work at the intersection of chemistry, biology, and materials science and introduced this style of investigation in India. His wide-ranging research on synthetic and natural lipids, gene delivery vehicles, natural and unnatural amino acids, oligopeptides, hydro- and organogels, bio-analytical sensors, cellular therapy mediate by gene transfection, molecular therapies design via G-quadruplex DNA binding, and biologically active natural product mimics is well known. He has been elected a fellow of the Indian National Science Academy New Delhi, The World Academy of Sciences Trieste, and the Indian Academy of Sciences Bangalore. In 2003, Council of Scientific and Industrial Research, the Government of India's apex scientific research organization, awarded him the Shanti Swarup Bhatnagar Prize for Science and Technology, the highest Indian award in science, for his contributions to chemical sciences. He has also received the Department of Biotechnology's National Bioscience Award for Career Development of the Department of Biotechnology (2002) and the UNESCO TWAS Prize (2010).

== Biography ==
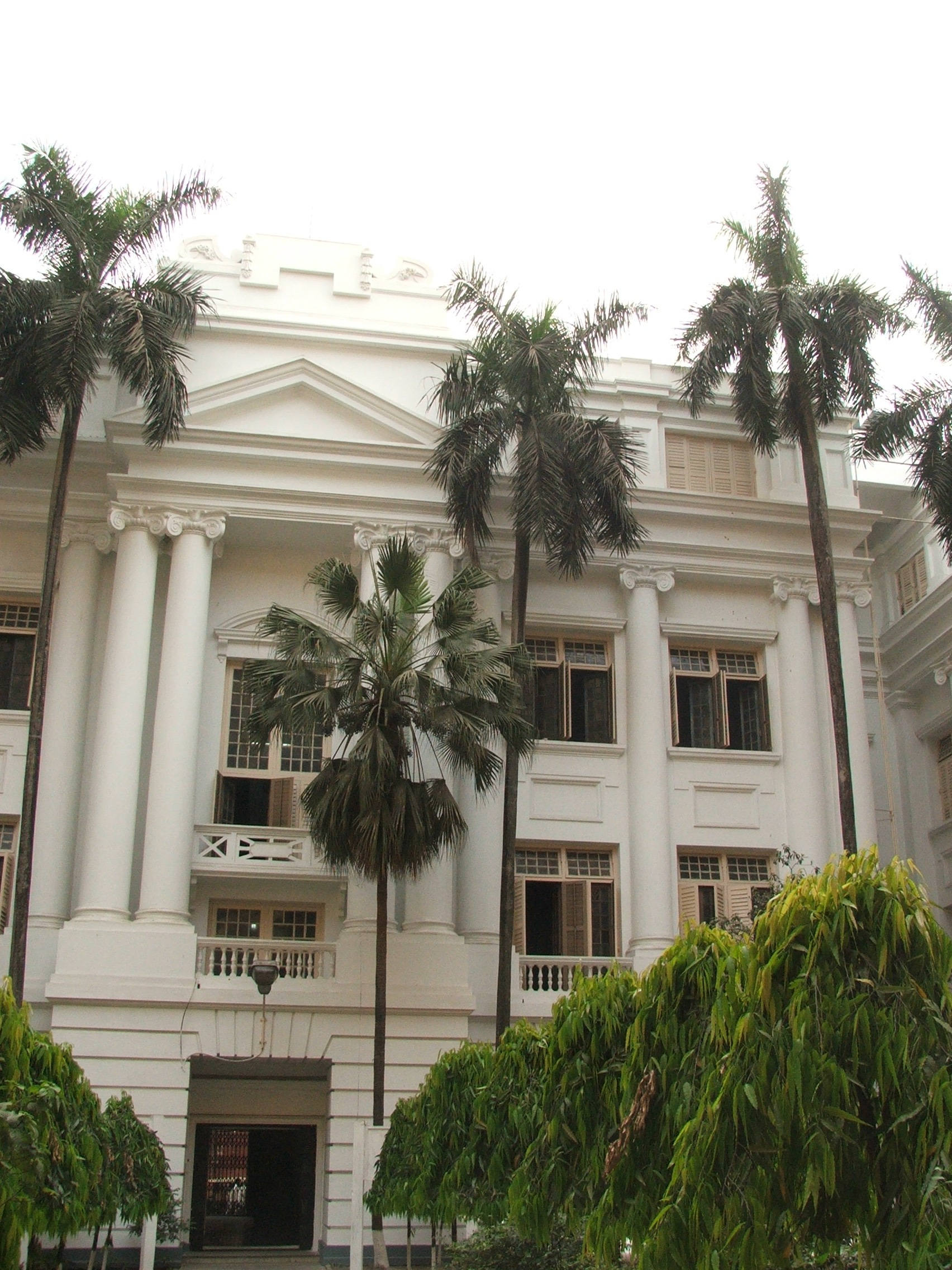
Calcutta University

Santanu Bhattacharya, born on 23 April 1958 in Calcutta (now called Kolkata) in the Indian state of West Bengal, graduated in Chemistry (B.Sc. Honors) from the Calcutta University and continued at the university to complete his master's degree from the Rajabazar Science College campus of University of Calcutta. Moving to the US, he enrolled for his doctoral studies on bio-organic chemistry at the laboratory of Professor Robert A. Moss of the Rutgers University – New Brunswick and after securing a PhD in 1988, he had a post-doctoral stint with Professor Har Gobind Khorana, a Nobel laureate at the Massachusetts Institute of Technology; the theme of his studies being signal transduction of membrane proteins. On his return to India, he joined the Indian Institute of Science where he served as an assistant professor (1991–96), associate professor (1996–2001) and a professor (since 2001); he served the department of organic chemistry at IISc as the chair. He was an honorary professor of JNCASR at its Chemical Biology unit. He served as the Director of the oldest research institute of Asia, the Indian Association for the Cultivation of Science (IACS) from 2015-2021. He also obliged as Director (Additional Charge) for the S.N. Bose National Centre for Basic Sciences (SNBNCBS) Kolkata, (2016). On 19 April 2023, Professor Bhattacharya joined as the Director of the Indian Institute of Science Education and Research, Tirupati (IISER-Tirupati).

== Legacy ==
Focusing his researches at the interfaces of chemistry, biology, materials science and nanotechnology, Bhattacharya made notable contributions in the design and synthesis of lipids, synthetic molecular membranes, gene and drug delivery vehicles, soft matter, molecular gels, small molecular bio-analytical sensors, unnatural amino acids and oligopeptides, G-quadruplex and Duplex-DNA binding small molecules as putative therapeutics, and other biologically active natural product mimics. He has carried out several projects which include lipid molecular design and biophysics, peptide designs, structural studies of micelles, DNA binding anti-cancer agents, and design and synthesis of nanomaterials. He has published his researches by way of several peer-reviewed articles; the online repository of the Indian Academy of Sciences has listed 356 of them. On the academic administration front, he established a laboratory for bio-organic and supramolecular studies at Indian Institute of Science. He has supervised the post-graduate, doctoral and post-doctoral studies of several scholars and has sat in the editorial boards of journals such as Bioconjugate Chemistry and Langmuir of American Chemical Society, and the Journal of Materials Nanoscience.

== Awards and honors ==
Bhattacharya received the B. M. Birla Science Award in 1997 Swarnajayanti Fellowship Award (DST) in 1998, the Materials Research Society of India Medal in 1999 and the Chemical Research Society of India Bronze Medal in 2000. The Department of Biotechnology awarded him with the National Bioscience Award for Career Development in 2002 and the Council of Scientific and Industrial Research awarded him in 2003 with the Shanti Swarup Bhatnagar Prize, one of the highest Indian science awards. He received the international TWAS Prize in 2010 the Ranbaxy Research Award in 2013 and SASTRA-CNR Rao Award in 2017. P. U. Bhagyatara National Award (2004), CDRI Award of the Central Drug Research Institute (2004) and the G. D. Birla Award (2007) are some of the other notable awards he has received. Holder of J. C. Bose National Fellowship in 2008 and Swarnajayanti Fellowship of the Department of Science and Technology during 1998–2003, he was elected as a fellow by the Indian Academy of Sciences in 2000 and he became an elected fellow of the Indian National Science Academy in 2007 and The World Academy of Sciences in 2012. He has also delivered several award orations including the D. Ranganathan Memorial Lecture of the Chemical Research Society of India (2007); Dr. Nitya Anand Endowment Lecture of the Indian National Science Academy (2007); the CDRI Diamond Jubilee Lecture, Central Drug Research Institute, Lucknow (2010); Dr. A.V. Rama Rao Foundation Lecture, JNCASR, Bangalore (2010); Dr. R. A. Mashelkar Endowment Lecture on Advanced Materials, National Chemical Laboratory, Pune (2012); Prof. U. R. Ghatak Endowment Lecture and Gold Medal, Indian Association for the Cultivation of Science, Kolkata (2013); Prof. T. R. Seshadri Memorial Lecture, Delhi University, New Delhi (2014); Prof. K. P. Basu Memorial Lecture, Jadavpur University, Kolkata (2015); the 12th Prof. S. Chandrasekhar Memorial Lecture, CeNS, Bengaluru (2015); the 21st Dr. J.N. Baruah Memorial Lecture, CSIR-NEIST, Jorhat (2015); the 6th Annual Chemistry Lecture, JNCASR, Bangalore (2016); the 38th Foundation Day Lecture, Institute of Advanced Study in Science & Technology, Paschim Boragaon, Guwahati (2016); Prof. C.N.R. Rao Distinguished Lecture, IIT Bombay, Mumbai (2018); the 1st Asian CES Lectureship, CRSI, IIT Kanpur (2019); the Acharya P. C. Ray Memorial Award Lecture, Indian Chemical Society (2020); Prof. G. B. Behera Endowment Lecture, Sambalpur University, Odisha (2021); the Acharya P.C. Ray Commemoration Lecture at CSIR-NIIST, Thiruvananthapuram (2021); Prof. V. L. Chopra Foundation Day Lecture, 5th Foundation Day, ICAR-National Institute for Plant Biotechnology, IARI New Delhi (2024); the 5th INST Langmuir Lecture, Institute of Nano Science and Technology, Mohali (2024); Sir Jnan Chandra Ghosh Memorial Lecture at IIT Kharagpur (2024) etc.

== See also ==
- Indian Association for the Cultivation of Science (IACS)
- Amino acids
- Lipids
- Oligo-peptides
- Nucleic acids
- Har Gobind Khorana
