= BioSpectrum =

Monthly magazine

- Type: Monthly magazine
- Owner: MM Activ
- Founded: 2006
- Language: English
- Headquarters: Bangalor
- Website: www.biospectrumindia.com

BioSpectrum is an English-language Indian biotech magazine that focuses on topics in pharma, agriculture, bioinformatics. It also covers news on corporates involved in R&D, industrial manufacturing or product/service distribution within the biotechnology sector.

The magazine is published in two editions: BioSpectrum India and BioSpectrum Asia. BioSpectrum India was launched in 2006. It was part of Cyber Media Limited until September 2013, when it was acquired by MM Activ. Its sister magazines under the Cyber Media banner included PCQuest, Dataquest, and MIT's Technology Review India. The headquarters of BioSpectrum is in Bangalore.
