= Indian Chemical Society =

- Formation: 1924
- Type: Non Profitable Organization
- Headquarters: Kolkata
- Location: India
- Members: paid enrollment
- Official language: English
- President: Prof. GD Yadav
- Website: http://indianchemicalsociety.com/

The Indian Chemical Society is a scientific society dedicated in the field of chemistry from India. It was established in 1924 with Prafulla Chandra Ray as its founding president. The same year the society started to publish its "Quarterly Journal of Indian Chemical Society" (1924– 1927) which is currently known as Journal of Indian Chemical Society.

== Fellows ==
- Animesh Chakravorty
- Dinesh Kumar (2012)

== Indian Chemical Society – North Branch ==
To serve more efficiently towards the scientific objective of the society, on the 3rd day of March 2020 ICS has launched the Indian Chemical Society – North Branch. Prof. Jatinder K Ratan is the President and Dr. Shivendu Ranjan as Vice President of ICS-North Branch. ICS-North branch has Prof. Vickram Jeet Singh as Secretary and Dr. Nandita Dasgupta as Joint Secretary.
