= Chemical Research Society of India =

Indian scientific society

- Formation: 1999
- Location: India
- Official language: English
- Website: crsi-india.org

Chemical Research Society of India (CRSI) is an India based scientific society dedicated to the field of chemistry. It was established in 1999 as a part of celebrating India's 50th anniversary of independence. C. N. R. Rao became its founder president and the organization currently has 1500 lifetime members.
