= Daniel Mindiola =

Venezuelan American chemist

Dr. Daniel Mindiola (born in 1974), a Venezuelan chemist, is the Brush Family Professor of Chemistry at the University of Pennsylvania. He specializes in inorganic and organometallic synthesis, catalysis, and mechanistic chemistry. He has over 200 peer-reviewed scientific publications.

== Early life and career ==
Daniel José Mindiola was born in 1974 in San Cristóbal, Táchira, Venezuela. He learned English by attending a bilingual school until third grade. In 1989, he immigrated to the United States, where he completed his high school studies graduating 1992. He attended Michigan State University and graduated with a Bachelor of Science in chemistry with honors in 1996. As an undergraduate, he conducted research with Kim Renee Dunbar, studying the binding modes of purine bases to anti-tumor drugs containing Re, Rh, and Pt. In 2000, he completed his PhD with Christopher C. Cummins at the Massachusetts Institute of Technology studying atom and group transfer reactions and low coordinate group 5 and 6 transition metal complexes.

He then worked as a NIH and FORD Postdoctoral Research Fellow for the late Gregory L. Hillhouse at the University of Chicago on metal mediated nitrous oxide reductions and group 10 complexes with multiple metal-ligand bonds. He joined the faculty in the department of chemistry at Indiana University in 2002, where he was promoted to associate professor in 2007 and professor in 2011. In 2013, he moved to the University of Pennsylvania as the Presidential Chair Professor of Chemistry before being named the Brush Family Professor of Chemistry in 2018.

He served as an associate editor for Dalton Transactions (2011–2014) and is currently an associate editor for Organometallics (2014–present). He has been a member of the editorial board for Inorganic Syntheses since 2014.

== Research interests ==
His research interests within organometallic chemistry focus on the synthesis of highly reactive transition metal species including radicals, complexes with metal-ligand multiple bonds, and the reactivity of such species with small molecules.

=== C-H activation reactions ===
Much of Mindiola's work with transition metal complexes has been applied to the intermolecular activation of inert C-H bonds to convert hydrocarbons into industrial products in a safe and cost-effective manner. Notably, in 2016, his team was able to catalytically borylate methane with an iridium catalyst.

=== Complexes with multiple metal-ligand bonds ===
Another thrust of his research program is the synthesis of coordinately unsaturated transition metal complexes with multiple metal-ligand bonds, especially metal alkylidene and alkylidyne complexes. These complexes can act as catalysts in olefin metathesis, polymerization, and group transfer reactions. In an account, he describes the synthesis of highly reactive titanium and vanadium species that were previously considered to be too unstable.

== Awards and honors ==
- F. Albert Cotton Award in Synthetic Inorganic Chemistry (2020)
- Brush Family Professor, University of Pennsylvania (2018–present)
- Fellow, American Association for the Advancement of Science (2018)
- John Simon Guggenheim Foundation Fellowship (2017)
- Presidential Chair Professorship, University of Pennsylvania (2013–2018)
- Fellow, Royal Society of Chemistry (2014)
- Friedrich Wilhelm Bessel Research Award, Alexander von Humboldt Foundation (2009–2010)
- National Fresenius Award, Phi Lambda Upsilon (2009)
- Dalton Lecturer, University of California at Berkeley (2008–2009)
- Camille Dreyfus Teacher-Scholar Award, Camille and Henry Dreyfus Foundation (2005–2012)
- Alfred P. Sloan Research Fellowship (2005–2007)
- Presidential Early Career Award for Scientists and Engineers (PECASE) (2004)
- National Science Foundation CAREER Award (2003–2008)
