= Inorganic Syntheses =

- Discipline: Inorganic chemistry
- Language: English

Publication details
- History: 1939-present
- Publisher: Inorganic Syntheses Organization, John Wiley & Sons

Standard abbreviations
- ISO 4: Inorg. Synth.

Indexing
- ISSN: 1934-4716

Links
- Series homepage; Series page at publisher's website

Inorganic Syntheses is a book series which aims to publish "detailed and foolproof" procedures for the synthesis of inorganic compounds. Although this series of books are edited, they usually are referenced like a journal, without mentioning the names of the checkers (referees) or the editor. A similar format is usually followed for the series Organic Syntheses.

== Volumes ==
Volume (Year)	ISBN	Editor(s), Affiliation(s)
v. 37 (2018)	9781119477822	Philip P. Power, University of California, Davis
v. 36 (2014)	1-118-74487-1	Alfred P. Sattleberger, Argonne National Lab; Gregory S. Girolami, University of Illinois at Urbana-Champaign
v. 35 (2010)	0-471-68255-4	Thomas B. Rauchfuss, University of Illinois at Urbana-Champaign
v. 34 (2004)	0-471-64750-0	John R. Shapley, University of Illinois at Urbana-Champaign
v. 33 (2002)	0-471-20825-6	Dimitri Coucouvanis, University of Michigan
v. 32 (1998)	0-471-24921-1	Marcetta Y. Darensbourg, Texas A&M University
v. 31 (1997)	0-471-15288-9	Alan H. Cowley, University of Texas at Austin
v. 30 (1995)	0-471-30508-1	Donald W. Murphy, AT&T Bell Laboratories; Leonard V. Interrante, Rensselaer Polytechnic Institute
v. 29 (1992)	0-471-54470-1	Russell N. Grimes, University of Virginia
v. 28 (1990)	0-471-52619-3	Robert Angelici, Iowa State University
v. 27 (1990)	0-471-50976-0	Alvin P. Ginsburg, AT&T Bell Laboratories
v. 26 (1989)	0-471-50485-8	Herbert D. Kaesz, University of California, Los Angeles
v. 25 (1989)	0-471-61874-8	Harry R. Allcock, Pennsylvania State University
v. 24 (1986)	0-471-83441-6	Jean’ne M. Shreeve, University of Idaho
v. 23 (1985)	0-471-81873-9	Stanley Kirschner, Wayne State University
v. 22 (1983)	0-471-88887-7	Smith L. Holt, Jr., Oklahoma State University
v. 21 (1982)	0-471-86520-6	John P. Fackler Jr., Case Western Reserve University
v. 20 (1980)	0-471-07715-1	Daryle H. Busch, Ohio State University
v. 19 (1979)	0-471-04542-X	Duward F. Shriver, Northwestern University
v. 18 (1978)	0-471-03393-6	Bodie E. Douglas, University of Pittsburgh
v. 17 (1977)	0-07-044327-0	Alan G. MacDiarmid, University of Pennsylvania
v. 16 (1976)	0-07-004015-x	Fred Basolo, Northwestern University
v. 15 (1974)	0-07-048521-6	George W. Parshall, E. I. du Pont de Nemours & Company
v. 14 (1973)	07-071320-0	Aaron Wold, Brown University; John K. Ruff, University of Georgia
v. 13 (1972)	07-013208-9	F. A. Cotton, Massachusetts Institute of Technology
v. 12 (1970)	07-048517-8	Robert W. Parry, University of Utah
v. 11 (1968)	NA	William L. Jolly, University of California, Berkeley
v. 10 (1967)	NA	Earl L. Muetterties, E. I. du Pont de Nemours & Company
v. 9 (1967)	NA	S. Young Tyree, Jr., College of William & Mary
v. 8 (1966)	NA	Henry F. Holtzclaw, Jr., University of Nebraska
v. 7 (1963)	NA	Jacob Kleinberg, University of Kansas
v. 6 (1960)	NA	Eugene G. Rochow, Harvard University
v. 5 (1957)	NA	Therald Moeller, University of Illinois at Urbana-Champaign
v. 4 (1953)	NA	John C. Bailar, Jr., University of Illinois at Urbana-Champaign
v. 3 (1950)	NA	Ludwig Audrieth, University of Illinois at Urbana-Champaign
v. 2 (1946)	9780470132333	W. Conard Fernelius, Syracuse University
v. 1 (1939)	NA	Harold Simmons Booth, Western Reserve University

== See also ==
- Organic Syntheses
