= Animesh Chakravorty =

Indian inorganic chemist (born 1935)

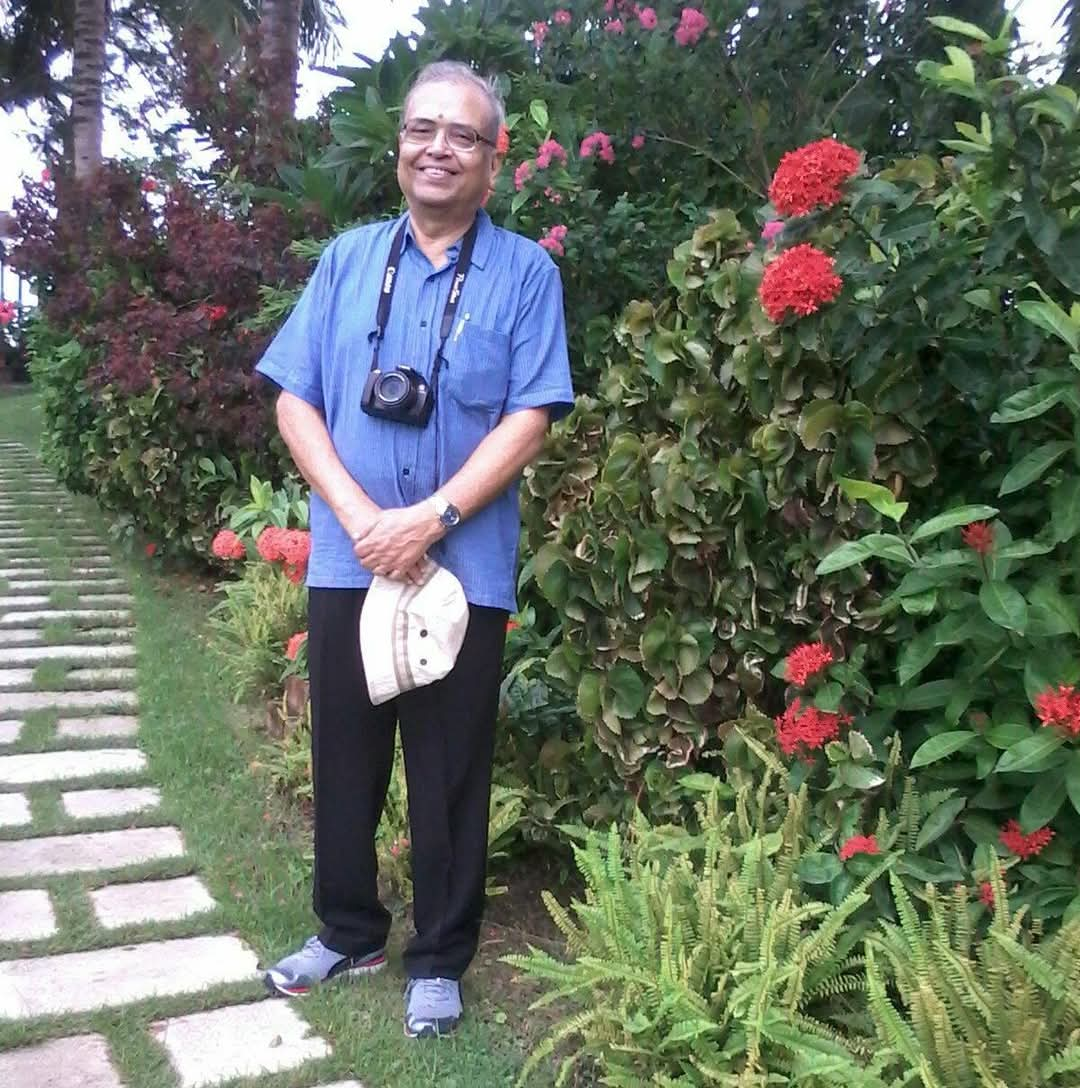
- Animesh Chakravorty at 2017
- Born: 30 June 1935 (age 91)
- Education: Scottish Church College Kolkata, B.Sc. (1955); College of Science (Calcutta University), M.Sc. (1957), Ph.D (1961)
- Spouse: Aparna Chakravorty
- Children: 2
- Awards: Shanti Swarup Bhatnagar Prize(1975); TWAS Prize (1993)
- Scientific career
- Fields: Inorganic Chemistry: Transition Metal Coordination Chemistry
- Workplaces: Indian Institute of Technology, Kanpur; Indian Association for the Cultivation of Science
- Thesis: Absorption Spectra of Metal Chelates
- Doctoral advisor: Sadhan Basu
- Other academic advisors: F. Albert Cotton; Richard H. Holm
- Doctoral students: Akhil Ranjan Chakravarty; Rabindranath Mukherjee; Sreebrata Goswami; Samaresh Bhattacharya; Goutam Kumar Lahiri; Sankarprasad Rath

Animesh Chakravorty (born 30 June 1935) is an Indian inorganic chemist.

== Biography ==
Born in Mymensingh city (now in Bangladesh), Chakravorty had his school education there and later in Kolkata after the family moved there in 1948. He received his BSc degree from Scottish Church College, Kolkata (1955); MSc and PhD degrees (1957 and 1961) from College of Science, University of Calcutta, Kolkata. His doctoral work was directed by Sadhan Basu (1922-1992). He also worked independently. He then went to Cambridge, USA to work (1961-1964) at Massachusetts Institute of Technology with Frank Albert Cotton (1930-2007) and later at Harvard University with Richard Hadley Holm (1933-2023). He returned home in 1964 and joined the Chemistry Faculty of Indian Institute of Technology, Kanpur (IITK) in as a lecturer, later becoming a professor (Head,1974–77). In 1977 he moved to Kolkata to lead the Department of Inorganic Chemistry at Indian Association for the Cultivation of Science (IACS), the oldest science research institute in India. He formally retired from IACS in 2000 but continued to work there till 2018 as an Emeritus Professor concurrently holding other externally supported research positions.

== Research ==
Chakravorty's research concerns synthesis, structure and reactions of new transition metal complexes. He is best known for his work on tuning of variable valence and scrutiny of associated redox phenomena. He is an early pioneer in the systematic use of the now-common voltammetric techniques as a powerful research tool in variable valence transition metal coordination chemistry initially using a home-built equipment. The work of his group has resulted in nearly 300 original papers encompassing the chemistry of manganese, iron and nickel groups of elements and of vanadium, molybdenum and copper. Representative examples are cited in each case. In the general framework of variable valence, the work is dotted with other themes such as ligand redistribution, spectroelectrochemical correlation, aromatic hydroxylation, oxygen atom transfer, cyclometalation, azo anion radical stabilization and more. The works on vanadium, manganese, iron and molybdenum are of peripheral bioinorganic chemistry.^{.} Chakravorty is also the author of several major review articles and book chapters. Chakravorty has a secondary interest in history of chemistry. He published numerous articles on this issue and a book on the contributions of the greatest among early torch bearers of modern chemistry in India, Prafulla Chandra Rây (1861-1944).

== Awards and professional outreach ==
- Shanti Swarup Bhatnagar Prize (1975); The World Academy of Sciences (TWAS) prize (1993); Lifetime Achievement Gold Medals of Chemical Research Society of India (2003) and of Indian Chemical Society (2005); P.C Rây Memorial Award of National Academy of Sciences, India (2018); Golden Jubilee Research Professorship (1996-2001) of Indian National Science Academy; Tata Chemical Platinum Jubilee Distinguished Emeritus Professorship (2014–16). DSc (Honoris Cause) of Burdwan University (2008).
- Fellow of Indian Academy of Sciences (FASc, 1975), of Indian National Science Academy (FNA,1978), of The World Academy of Sciences (FTWAS, 1995). Bureau Member (1991-99) thereafter Fellow of IUPAC, Honorary Fellow of Indian Chemical Society (1999) and President of the Chemical Research Society of India (2006–09).
- Member Editorial Boards of Inorganic Chemica Acta (1975–80), Dalton Transactions (1992–96), Inorganic Chemistry (1997–99), Indian Journal of Chemistry Sect.A(1992–98, 2002–07) and Comprehensive Coordination Chemistry-II (CCCII), 10 Volumes, Elsevier (1987).
- Honored via dedicated Issues: Indian Academy of Sciences, Proceedings Chemical Science (August, 1995) Inorganica Chimica Acta (October,2010) and Journal of Indian Chemical Society (December, 2015).
- Honorary Professor (1990–95) and Hindustan Lever Research Professor (2001–06) of Jawaharlal Nehru Centre for Advanced Scientific Research; Jawaharlal Nehru Professor of Hyderabad University (1994); Ramanna Fellow of the Department of Science and Technology (2010–13); Visiting Professor Texas A&M University (1983).
- In 2006 the Chemical Research Society of India established the biennale Prof. Animesh Chakravorty Endowment Lecture to be delivered as part the Society's Conference by a very distinguished inorganic chemist of the world. The 10th Lecture was held in 2024. The endowment fund for this Lecture was donated by students and admirers of Chakravorty.
- Delivered numerous plenary, endowed, anniversary, commemorative, foundation day and other categories of invited lectures in conferences and in academic and industrial institutions in India and abroad. These include Special Harvard/MIT Inorganic Chemistry Colloquium at MIT (1983), Gordon Research Conference on Inorganic Chemistry at Wolfeboro, NH, USA (1987); 9th National Convention, Royal Australian Chemical Institution, Monash University, Melbourne, Australia (1992) and the Third International Symposium on the Chemistry and Biological Chemistry of Vanadium in Osaka University, Japan (2001).
- Leader of the Indian delegation to the Indo-Russian Symposium on Inorganic and Organometallic Chemistry jointly organized by Indian National Science Academy and Russian Academy of Sciences and held at Nizhnni Navogorad, the leader on the Russian side being M.V.Vol'pin (1993).
- In 1985 convened a conference titled "Recent Trends in Inorganic Chemistry" at IACS as part of the Golden Jubilee Celebrations of Indian National Science Academy (1985). This was the seed of the premier international conference, "Modern Trends in Inorganic Chemistry" (MTIC), now a major yearly event that moves from one institution to another within India with participants from India and abroad.
- Has served as Chairman/Advisor/Member of Governing Councils/ Committees of numerous Academic Institutions and Governmental Departments supporting planning and research in science in India.

== Personal life ==
Chakravorty is married to Aparna and they have two children.
