= Qingsheng Wang =

American chemical engineer

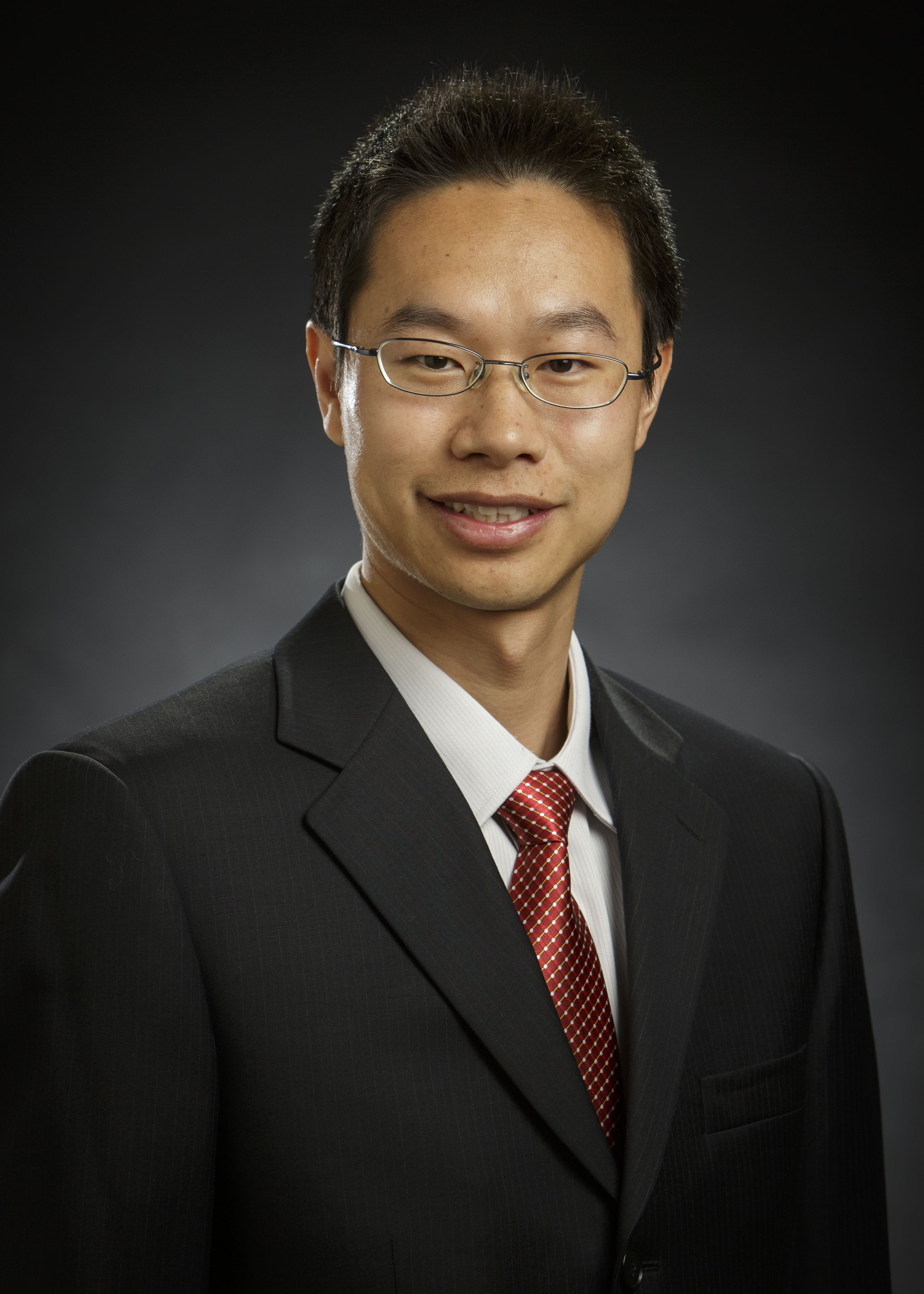
- Wang in April 2013
- Education: Zhejiang University; Texas A&M University
- Known for: Process Safety; Fire Safety; Artificial Intelligence
- Scientific career
- Fields: Chemical Engineering
- Workplaces: Oklahoma State University; Texas A&M University
- Doctoral advisor: M. Sam Mannan
- Other academic advisors: F. Albert Cotton

Qingsheng Wang is a Chinese–American chemical engineer and academic who serves as a Professor of Chemical Engineering at Texas A&M University. He has published over 200 journal papers, 14 book chapters, 2 books, and holds 4 patents/copyrights, and has supervised 20 PhD and 31 MS students, with three pursuing academic careers and the others contributing to the energy and the pharmaceutical industry. Currently, Wang leads the Texas A&M University Multiscale Process Safety Laboratory, where he pioneers research in process safety, energy safety, artificial intelligence (AI) and machine learning (ML) for safety, large-scale field testing, and flame retardants.

== Education ==
Wang earned his bachelor's degree in 2003 and master's degree in 2005, both in Chemistry from Zhejiang University. He went on to Texas A&M University to study chemistry under F. Albert Cotton, and obtained his doctoral degree in Chemical Engineering in 2010 under the supervision of M. Sam Mannan. Wang was significantly influenced by Trevor Kletz during the period when Kletz served as an adjunct professor in the Artie McFerrin Department of Chemical Engineering at Texas A&M University.

== Career ==
In 2010, Wang joined the faculty at Oklahoma State University and received early tenure in 2015. In 2019, Wang moved back to Texas A&M University and was promoted to Professor in 2024. His research interests include the following: process safety, energy safety, AI and machine learning, computational fluid dynamics (CFD) for energy and process systems, and flame-retardant polymers. He published a book "Machine Learning in Chemical Safety and Health: Fundamentals with Applications."

Wang is an Editor for Journal of Loss Prevention in the Process Industries, Subject Editor for Process Safety and Environmental Protection, and Associate Editor for Journal of Occupational and Environmental Hygiene. He also serves as the editorial board member of Journal of Hazardous Materials, ACS Chemical Health and Safety, Journal of Thermal Analysis and Calorimetry, and Process Safety Progress. He is a registered professional engineer in the state of California and is a Certified Safety Professional.
