= M. Sam Mannan =

American chemical engineer (1954–2018)

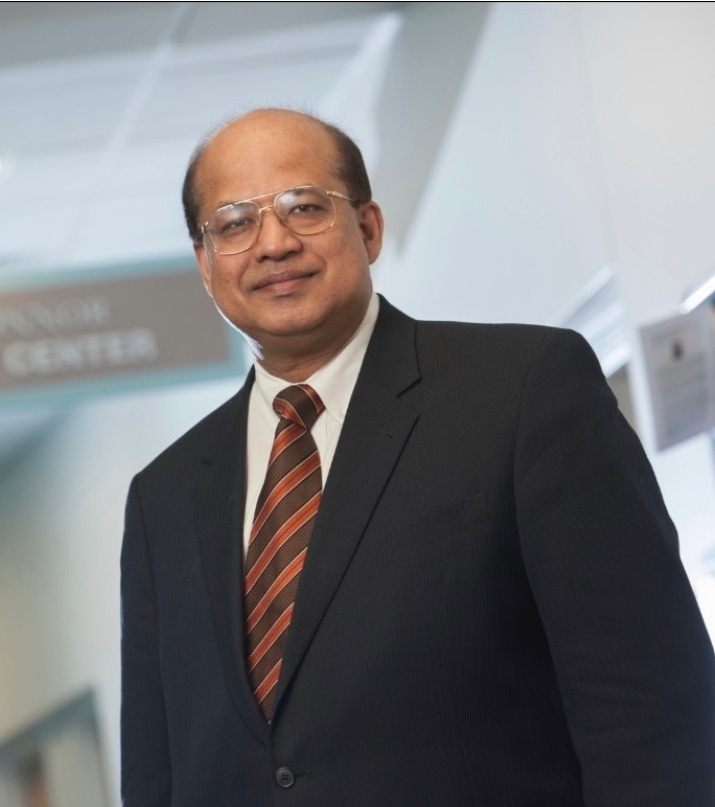
- Born: November 10, 1954; Bangladesh
- Died: September 11, 2018 (aged 63); Texas
- Education: Bangladesh University of Engineering and Technology; The University of Oklahoma
- Known for: Process Safety
- Scientific career
- Fields: Chemical Engineering
- Workplaces: Texas A&M University; The University of Oklahoma
- Doctoral advisor: Kenneth E. Starling
- Other academic advisors: Trevor Kletz
- Doctoral students: Qingsheng Wang

M. Sam Mannan (November 10, 1954 – September 11, 2018) was a Bangladeshi chemical engineer who was professor of chemical engineering at Texas A&M University. He was also the director of the Mary Kay O'Connor Process Safety Center of the Texas A&M Engineering Experiment Station.

== Early life and education ==
Mannan was born in Comilla, Bangladesh, in 1954. He earned his bachelor's degree in 1978 from the Bangladesh University of Engineering and Technology in Dhaka. Then he went on to the University of Oklahoma, where he earned a master's degree (1983) and Ph.D. (1986) in chemical engineering.

== Professional life ==
After graduating in 1986, Mannan was hired as an assistant professor with the School of Chemical Engineering and Materials Science at the University of Oklahoma. He remained at the University of Oklahoma until 1990, when he became the Division Director for RMT, Inc., a nationwide engineering services company. In 1994, he was appointed Vice President of RMT, Inc.

With encouragement from his mentor Trevor Kletz, Mannan left industry in 1997 to accept the position of director of the Mary Kay O'Connor Process Safety Center and associate professor at Texas A&M University. He was a registered professional engineer in the states of Texas and Louisiana and was a Certified Safety Professional.
