= Fluorescence intermittency =

Blinking in quantum mechanics

Fluorescence intermittency, or blinking, is the phenomenon of random switching between ON (bright) and OFF (dark) states of the emitter under its continuous excitation. It is a common property of the nanoscale emitters (molecular fluorophores, colloidal quantum dots) related to the competition between the radiative and non-radiative relaxation pathways. The peculiar feature of such blinking in most cases is the power-law (in contrast to exponential) statistics of the ON and OFF time distributions, meaning that the measurements of the time-averaged intensity of a single emitter is not reproducible in different experiments and implying a complex dynamics of the involved process. In other words, in one experiment the emitter can blink frequently, while in another it may stay ON (or OFF) for almost entire length of the experiment (even for extremely long measurement times).

For CdSe-ZnS core-shell nanocrystals, "charge trapping" is the dominant theory explaining observed power-law blinking kinetics. Charge carrier trapping describes the transfer of a charge carrier from a delocalized electronic state of the nanocrystal to a localized state.

== See also ==
- Fluorescence intermittency in colloidal nanocrystals
