= Milliron =

Milliron is a surname. Notable people with the surname include:

- Delia Milliron (fl. 2004), American chemical engineer
- John Milliron (born 1947), American politician
