= Andrew H. Marcus =

American physical chemist

- Born: Andrew Harrison Marcus; 1967 (age 57–58)
- Occupation: Physical chemist
- Awards: American Physical Society Fellow, 2014

Academic background
- Education: B.A., 1987, University of California, San Diego; Ph.D., 1994, Stanford University
- Thesis: Probing the structure of bulk polymers and alloys using electronic excitation transport
- Doctoral advisor: Michael D. Fayer

Andrew H. Marcus (born 1967) is a physical chemist whose multidisciplinary research on the faculty at the University of Oregon explores macromolecular dynamics in biological environments.

== Early life and education ==
In 1987, Marcus received a B.A. from the University of California, San Diego. He earned a Ph.D. in physical chemistry at Stanford University in 1994 with advisor Michael D. Fayer. His dissertation was titled, Probing the structure of bulk polymers and alloys using electronic excitation transport. His postdoctoral work at the University of Chicago, James Franck Institute, was advised by Stuart A. Rice.

== Career ==
Marcus held a postdoctoral research position at the University of Chicago before joining the department of chemistry and biochemistry faculty at the University of Oregon in 1996.

His research interests are interdisciplinary among the Departments of Chemistry and Biochemistry, Physics, and the Oregon Center for Optical Molecular & Quantum Science. His group examines "the structure and dynamics of macromolecules in biological environments", and he collaborates with faculty in Chemistry and Physics departments, "studying the ultrafast dynamics of excited electronic-vibrational states in coupled molecular networks, which are structurally ordered in DNA".

== Selected publications ==
- Tekavec, Patrick F.; Lott, Geoffrey A.; Marcus, Andrew H. (December 7, 2007). "Fluorescence-detected two-dimensional electronic coherence spectroscopy by acousto-optic phase modulation". The Journal of Chemical Physics. 127 (21): 214307. Bibcode:2007JChPh.127u4307T. doi:10.1063/1.2800560. ISSN 0021-9606. PMID 18067357.
- Karki, Khadga J.; Widom, Julia R.; Seibt, Joachim; Moody, Ian; Lonergan, Mark C.; Pullerits, Tõnu; Marcus, Andrew H. (December 18, 2014). "Coherent two-dimensional photocurrent spectroscopy in a PbS quantum dot photocell". Nature Communications. 5 (1): 5869. Bibcode:2014NatCo...5.5869K. doi:10.1038/ncomms6869. ISSN 2041-1723. PMID 25519819.
- Tekavec, Patrick F.; Dyke, Thomas R.; Marcus, Andrew H. (November 21, 2006). "Wave packet interferometry and quantum state reconstruction by acousto-optic phase modulation". The Journal of Chemical Physics. 125 (19): 194303. Bibcode:2006JChPh.125s4303T. doi:10.1063/1.2386159. ISSN 0021-9606. PMID 17129099.
- Lott, Geoffrey A.; Perdomo-Ortiz, Alejandro; Utterback, James K.; Widom, Julia R.; Aspuru-Guzik, Alán; Marcus, Andrew H. (October 4, 2011). "Conformation of self-assembled porphyrin dimers in liposome vesicles by phase-modulation 2D fluorescence spectroscopy". Proceedings of the National Academy of Sciences. 108 (40): 16521–16526. arXiv:1108.1143. Bibcode:2011PNAS..10816521L. doi:10.1073/pnas.1017308108. ISSN 0027-8424. PMC 3189026. PMID 21940499.
- Raymer, M. G.; Marcus, Andrew H.; Widom, Julia R.; Vitullo, Dashiell L. P. (December 12, 2013). "Entangled Photon-Pair Two-Dimensional Fluorescence Spectroscopy (EPP-2DFS)". The Journal of Physical Chemistry B. 117 (49): 15559–15575. doi:10.1021/jp405829n. ISSN 1520-6106. PMID 24047447.
- von Hippel, Peter H.; Johnson, Neil P.; Marcus, Andrew H. (July 2013). "50 years of DNA 'Breathing': Reflections on old and new approaches [For special issue of biopolymers on 50 years of nucleic acids research]". Biopolymers. 99 (12): 923–954. doi:10.1002/bip.22347. PMC 4313903. PMID 23840028.

== Awards, honors ==
- 1997 Research Corporation Innovation Award
- 1999 NSF CAREER Award
- 2001 Innovative Polymer Research Lecturer, National Institutes of Standards and Technology
- 2014 University of Wisconsin John L. Schrag Memorial Lectureship
- 2014 Fund for Faculty Excellence Award
- 2014 Interdisciplinary Research Award, UO Office of Research, Innovation and Graduate Education
- 2014 Elected Fellow of American Physical Society. Citation: For his contribution to the development of linear and nonlinear fluorescence correlation spectroscopies, and their application to the study of the structure and dynamics of biochemical systems.
