= Charles B. Harris =

American physical chemist (1940–2020)

- Born: April 24, 1940; New York City, New York, U.S.
- Died: March 10, 2020 (aged 79); Berkeley, California, U.S.
- Education: University of Michigan (BS); Massachusetts Institute of Technology (PhD)
- Scientific career
- Fields: Physical chemistry
- Workplaces: University of California, Berkeley
- Doctoral advisor: F. Albert Cotton
- Doctoral students: Paul Alivisatos; Michael D. Fayer
- Other notable students: Postdoc: Ahmed Zewail; Alan Campion

Charles Bonner Harris (April 24, 1940 – March 10, 2020) was an American physical chemist.

== Education and career ==
Charles B. Harris was born in New York City and spent most of his youth in Grosse Pointe. He attended the University of Michigan and received a bachelor's degree in chemistry in 1963. In 1966, he received his Ph.D. in chemistry at the Massachusetts Institute of Technology under F. Albert Cotton. His doctoral research included the determination of the crystal structure of potassium octachlorodirhenate, which led to its identification as the first substance shown to have a quadruple bond.

In 1967, Harris went to the University of California, Berkeley, where he became a professor in the chemistry department. He headed this department from 2003 and was dean of the faculty from 2004 to 2007. In 2015, he retired. His research focus was in the field of ultrafast dynamics and electron dynamics as well as the dynamics of chemical reactions in liquids.

He educated multiple generations of scientists in chemical dynamics and ultrafast science who have since become leaders in the field including, as Ph.D. students, Paul Alivisatos, Michael D. Fayer, Roseanne Sension, Nien-Hui Ge, Kelly Gaffney and as postdocs, Ahmed Zewail and Alan Campion.

== Honors and awards ==
Harris was elected a member of the National Academy of Sciences in 2002. Besides, he is also a member the American Association for the Advancement of Science, the American Academy of Arts and Sciences, the American Physical Society, and the Optical Society of America.
