= John J. Wise =

American chemical engineer and research executive

John J. Wise (February 28, 1932 – June 13, 2021) was an American chemical engineer and research executive who served as vice president of research at Mobil Research and Development Corporation. His leadership helped shape one of the most impactful industrial R&D organizations of the late 20th century. Wise was elected to the National Academy of Engineering in 1986 for inspiring technical contributions and leadership in the development and commercialization of important petroleum, petrochemical, and synthetic fuels processes.

Born in Cambridge, Massachusetts, Wise was inspired early by textbooks from his father's publishing work and decided at 14 to pursue chemical engineering. He graduated from Tufts University in 1953 and joined Mobil, where he contributed to the development of zeolite catalysts and technologies for producing high-value petrochemicals like PET.

In the 1960s, he earned a Ph.D. in inorganic chemistry from MIT under F. Albert Cotton, then returned to Mobil, rising through senior research and leadership roles. In 1987, he became vice president of research, overseeing global innovation in refining, lubricants, and synthetic fuels. Under his direction, Mobil successfully commercialized its methanol-to-gasoline (MTG) process in New Zealand. Wise was active in national science policy through the National Research Council and the Intergovernmental Panel on Climate Change, and received the Industrial Research Institute's Gold Medal in 1995.

He was married to early childhood educator Rosemary Bishop, who predeceased him in 2013. Wise passed away in Princeton, New Jersey, in 2021 at the age of 89. He is survived by two daughters, a grandson, and his companion Mary Masland Adams.
