= Vicki Colvin =

American scientist

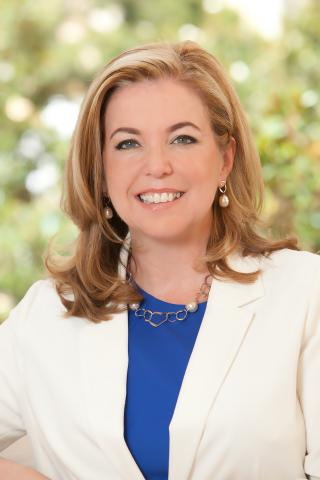
- Born: October 12, 1965 (age 61)
- Education: Stanford University (BS); University of California, Berkeley (PhD)
- Known for: Nanotechnology
- Scientific career
- Fields: Molecular pharmacology
- Workplaces: Louisiana State University; AT&T Bell Laboratories; Rice University; Brown University
- Doctoral advisor: Paul Alivisatos

Vicki Leigh Colvin (born October 12, 1965) is a professor of engineering and molecular pharmacology at Brown University, and has been selected as the next dean of the Louisiana State University College of Engineering. At Brown, she is the director of the Centre for Biomedical Engineering. Her work focuses on the synthesis and characterization of nanomaterials. She is a Fellow of the American Association for the Advancement of Science and the American Institute for Medical and Biological Engineering.

== Early life and education ==
Colvin was inspired to study science after watching her mother drink coffee. She is the daughter of Harry Colvin and Carolyn Collins. She earned her bachelor's degree in chemistry and physics at Stanford University in 1988. She completed her doctoral studies in 1994 under the supervision of Paul Alivisatos at the UC Berkeley College of Chemistry. After completing her PhD, Colvin joined AT&T Bell Laboratories. Here she worked on materials for holographic data storage.

== Career ==
Colvin was appointed to Rice University in 1996 as part of their expansion in nanotechnology. She was awarded a Phi Beta Kappa teaching prize and named as Discover magazine's Top Scientists to Watch. Her research was supported by a fellowship from the Alfred P. Sloan Foundation. She pioneered the use of water-soluble quantum dots in biomedicine. The quantum dots can be encapsulated into amphiphilic polymers, which allows control of the quantum dot toxicity. As a model for tissue localization following intradermal infiltration, Colvin studied how quantum dots migrate in mice. She found that 1D quantum dots remain as a deposit on the skin and penetrate the nearby subcutis and were distributed to draining lymph nodes. She bound quantum dots to gold nanoparticles with a peptide sequence, which suppresses luminescence; allowing the combination to be used as probes for targeted degradation. She investigated how the shape of quantum dots impacted their function and toxicity. She demonstrated that weathering quantum dots in acidic and alkaline conditions can increase the bactericidal activity due to the rapid release of cadmium and selenite ions. Her group worked on other nanomaterials, including fullerene C60.

At Rice University, Colvin was appointed the Kenneth S. Pitzer-Schlumberger Professor of Chemistry. Her work continued to consider the interactions of nanoparticles, with applications in water purification. She is particularly interested in how nanoparticles interact with living systems. She investigated cerium oxide nanocrystals, and whether when they could be used for medical applications when coated in oleic acid. Colvin led a UK-US scientific effort to create a framework to regulate the use of nanomaterials. She delivered the 2012 Arthur M. Sackler Colloquium, talking about the properties of nanoparticles. In 2013 Colvin was named by Chemistry of Materials as one of their most highly cited investigators. Her recent research looks at sorbents that can help to remove arsenic.

=== Academic service ===
Colvin was director of the National Science Foundation Center for Biological and Environmental Nanotechnology from 2001 to 2011. She was elected a Fellow of the American Association for the Advancement of Science in 2007 and the American Institute for Medical and Biological Engineering in 2011. She became the vice provost for research at Rice University in 2011. Colvin joined Brown University as provost in 2014, after a nationwide search, and resigned after less than a year in the position. She joined the board of the Schlumberger Foundation that year, with the hope to secure funding for women scientists. During her time as provost, she created an entrepreneurial education program, reined in the budget deficit and established a vice provost of the arts position. She stepped down from her role as provost in June 2015 to focus on her research. She has taught multiple courses for Coursera and is an advocate for flipped classroom learning. She is an editor of the journal Small.

Colvin was named the chair of the committee to conduct the quadrennial review of the National Nanotechnology Initiative (NNI) of The National Academies of Sciences, Engineering, and Medicine.
