= Craig L. Hill =

- Born: February 24, 1949 (age 77); Pomona, California,
- Education: Massachusetts Institute of Technology Ph.D. (1975)
- Known for: Polyoxometalate photochemistry, polyoxometalate-based catalysts for the functionalization of C-H bonds
- Scientific career
- Fields: Inorganic chemistry
- Workplaces: Emory University
- Doctoral advisor: George M. Whitesides
- Other academic advisors: Richard H. Holm

Craig L. Hill (born in Pomona, California) is an American scientist. He is working now with his research group at the Emory University.

== Academic career ==
Professor Hill received his Ph.D. from the Massachusetts Institute of Technology in 1975 under the direction of George M. Whitesides and did postdoctoral work at Stanford University under the direction of Richard H. Holm (1975–1977). After teaching at the University of California, Berkeley (1977–1983), he moved to Emory University where he is currently Goodrich C. White Professor of Science.

== Research ==
Hill’s achievements include the development of polyoxometalate photochemistry and polyoxometalate-based catalysts for the functionalization of C–H bonds (carbon–hydrogen bond activation) and very fast air-based oxidations (for decontamination, remediation, chemical transformations). He developed catalytic systems that self repair, self buffer and conduct more than one task. His group recently pioneered the first soluble and stable catalysts for oxidizing water, a key component in production of solar fuels (splitting water with sunlight to produce green hydrogen fuel and oxygen: H_{2}O + light/energy ® H_{2} + ½ O_{2}) (artificial photosynthesis).

Hill’s research encompasses fundamental structural and reactivity studies, catalysis, functional nanomaterials (Nanotechnology), antiviral chemotherapy and solar energy conversion (artificial photosynthesis). The principal systems he studies are inorganic cluster molecules, particularly transition metal oxygen anion clusters or polyoxometalates. The general theme of his research is the design and realization of highly complex structures to facilitate one or more intellectually challenging and/or societally important tasks.

Hill’s research has been recognized by a Senior Award from the von Humboldt Society (1995), the Albert E. Levy Science Research Award (1996), the U.S. Department of Agriculture National Group Honor Award for Excellence in Research (1996) and three awards of the American Chemical Society: the Charles H. Stone Award (1992), the Southern Chemist Award (2002) and the Herty Medal (2009). He is Fellow of the American Association for the Advancement of Science (2006) and the Victorian Institute of Chemical Sciences (2006). He has edited journals, served on several journal editorial review boards, and hosted 5 national and international conferences in the chemical sciences.
