= F. Albert Cotton =

American chemist (1930–2007)

Frank Albert Cotton
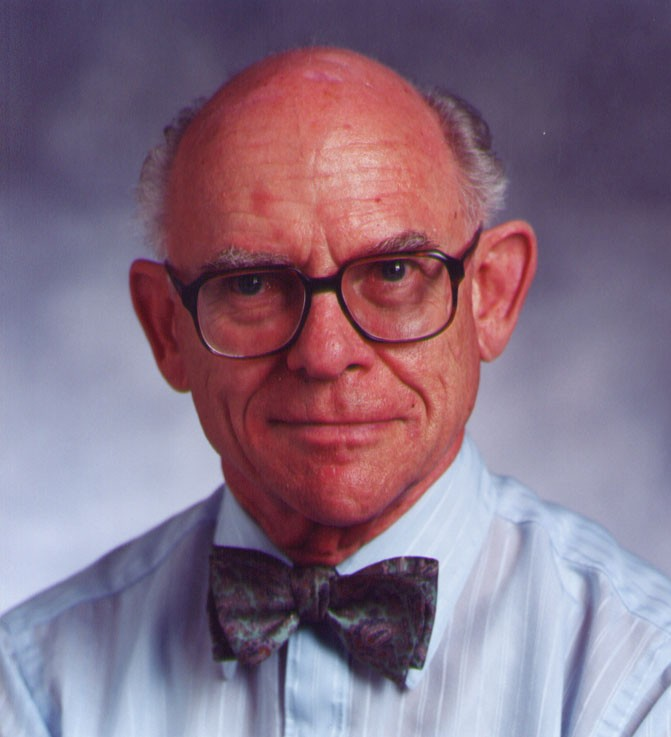
- Cotton in August 2005
- Born: April 9, 1930; Philadelphia, Pennsylvania, U.S.
- Died: February 20, 2007 (aged 76); College Station, Texas, U.S.
- Education: Harvard University
- Known for: Metal-Metal Bonding; Hapticity and Fluxionality
- Awards: William H. Nichols Medal (1975); Linus Pauling Award (1976); National Medal of Science (1982); NAS Award in Chemical Sciences (1990); Welch Award in Chemistry (1994); Priestley Medal (1998); Wolf Prize (2000)
- Scientific career
- Fields: Inorganic Chemistry
- Workplaces: Massachusetts Institute of Technology; Texas A&M University
- Doctoral advisor: Geoffrey Wilkinson
- Doctoral students: Richard H. Holm; Stephen J. Lippard; Charles B. Harris; Tobin J. Marks; Hong-Cai (Joe) Zhou; John J. Wise; Walter G. Klemperer; John P. Fackler Jr.; Richard D. Adams
- Other notable students: Ada Yonath; Kim Renee Dunbar; Qingsheng Wang; Kenneth G. Caulton; Bruce E. Bursten; Akhil Ranjan Chakravarty; Brian F. G. Johnson; Susumu Kitagawa; Fausto Calderazzo; Animesh Chakravorty; Wolfgang Kaim

Frank Albert Cotton FRS (April 9, 1930 – February 20, 2007) was an American chemist. He was the W.T. Doherty-Welch Foundation Chair and Distinguished Professor of Chemistry at Texas A&M University. He authored over 1600 scientific articles. Cotton was recognized for his research on the chemistry of the transition metals.

== Early life and education ==
Cotton, known as "Al" Cotton, or "F Albert" on publications, was born on April 9, 1930, in Philadelphia, Pennsylvania. He attended local public schools before attending Drexel University and then Temple University, both in Philadelphia. After earning his Bachelor of Arts degree from Temple in 1951, Cotton pursued a Ph.D. thesis under the guidance of Sir Geoffrey Wilkinson at Harvard University where he worked on metallocenes. He received his Ph.D. in 1955.

== Career ==
Following his graduation from Harvard University, Cotton began teaching at Massachusetts Institute of Technology (MIT). In 1961, at 31-years-old, he became the youngest person to have received a full professorship at MIT. His work emphasized both electronic structure and chemical synthesis. He pioneered the study of multiple bonding between transition metal atoms, starting with research on rhenium halides, and in 1964 identified the quadruple bond in the Re_{2}Cl^{2−}_{8} ion. His work soon focused on other metal-metal bonded species, elucidating the structure of chromium(II) acetate.

He was an early proponent of single crystal X-ray diffraction as a tool for elucidating the extensive chemistry of metal complexes. Through his studies on clusters, he demonstrated that many exhibited "fluxionality", whereby ligands interchange coordination sites on spectroscopically observable time-scales. He coined the term "hapticity" and the nomenclature that derives from it.

In 1962 he undertook the crystal structure of the Staphylococcal nuclease enzyme, solved to 2Å resolution in 1969, published in 1971, and deposited in the Protein Data Bank (PDB code 1SNS) as one of the first dozen protein crystal structures.

In 1972 Cotton moved to Texas A&M University as the Robert A. Welch Professor of Chemistry. The following year he was named the Doherty-Welch Distinguished Professor of Chemistry. He also served as the director of the university's Laboratory for Molecular Structure and Bonding.

== Pedagogical influence ==
In addition to his research, Cotton taught inorganic chemistry. He authored Chemical Applications of Group Theory. This text focuses on group theoretical analysis of bonding and spectroscopy.

Among college students, Cotton is perhaps best known as the coauthor of the textbook Advanced Inorganic Chemistry, now in its sixth English edition. Coauthored with his thesis advisor, Sir Geoffrey Wilkinson, and now with coauthors Carlos Murillo and Manfred Bochmann, the textbook is colloquially known as "Cotton and Wilkinson." The text surveys coordination chemistry, cluster chemistry, homogeneous catalysis, and organometallic chemistry.

Cotton served on various editorial boards of scientific journals, including those of the Journal of the American Chemical Society, Inorganic Chemistry, and Organometallics. He chaired the Division of Inorganic Chemistry of the ACS and was an ACS Councillor for five years. He served on the U.S. National Science Board (1986–1998), which oversees the National Science Foundation, and the Scientific and Technical Advisory Committee of Argonne National Laboratory, and the National Research Laboratory Commission of Texas.

Cotton supervised the thesis research of 116 doctoral students as well as more than 150 postdoctoral associates, including Richard H. Holm, Stephen J. Lippard, Charles B. Harris, Tobin J. Marks, John J. Wise, Susumu Kitagawa and Ada Yonath. This academic lineage has become one of the most influential in the field of chemistry, extending to third-generation scholars such as Omar M. Yaghi, Jeffrey R. Long, Jeremy M. Berg, Jacqueline Barton, Chuan He, Amy Rosenzweig, Wesley I. Sundquist, John F. Hartwig, JoAnne Stubbe, Paul Alivisatos, Michael D. Fayer, Lawrence Que Jr., Christopher J. Chang, Ahmed Zewail, and Mercouri Kanatzidis.

== Recognition ==
Among the awards Cotton received included the U.S. National Medal of Science in 1982, the Wolf Prize in 2000; and the Priestley Medal, the American Chemical Society's highest recognition, in 1998.

In 1995, the Department of Chemistry at Texas A&M along with the local section of the American Chemical Society, inaugurated the annual F.A. Cotton Medal for excellence in chemical research.

A second award named in his honor, the F. Albert Cotton Award for Synthetic Inorganic Chemistry, is presented at the National Meeting of the American Chemical Society each year.

Cotton was a member of the National Academy of Sciences in the United States, and the corresponding academies in Russia, China, the United Kingdom, France, and Denmark, as well as the American Philosophical Society. He received twenty-nine honorary doctorates.

== Run for ACS presidency ==
Cotton caused a controversy in his run for President of the American Chemical Society for 1984, wherein he mailed a letter to selected members describing his opponent as "a mediocre industrial chemist". Cotton ultimately lost the bid to his opponent Dr. Warren D. Niederhauser of Rohm & Haas.

== F.A. Cotton Medal for Excellence in Chemical Research ==
The F.A. Cotton Medal, established in 1994, is awarded annually by the Texas A&M Section of the American Chemical Society to recognize accomplishments in research rather than distinction of any other sort, no matter how meritorious. The award is sponsored by the F. Albert Cotton Endowment Fund, which was initially raised by Carlos A. Murillo in honor of Frank Albert Cotton, to whom the first medal was awarded in 1995. The recipient receives, in addition to the medal, a bronze replica thereof and a certificate describing the award.

== Prize Winners of F. A. Cotton Medal ==
Source: Texas A&M Section of the American Chemical Society

- 1995 F. Albert Cotton, Texas A&M University
- 1996 George A. Olah, University of Southern California
- 1997 Pierre-Gilles de Gennes, École Supérieure de Physique et de Chimie Industrielles de la Ville de Paris, Collège de France
- 1998 JoAnne Stubbe, Massachusetts Institute of Technology
- 1999 Alexander Pines, University of California, Berkeley
- 2000 Tobin J. Marks, Northwestern University
- 2001 Samuel J. Danishefsky, Columbia University
- 2002 Ada Yonath, Weizmann Institute of Science
- 2003 Gabor A. Somorjai, University of California, Berkeley
- 2004 Albert Eschenmoser, Swiss Federal Institute of Technology, Zurich, and Scripps Research Institute
- 2005 Richard H. Holm, Harvard University
- 2006 Robin M. Hochstrasser, University of Pennsylvania
- 2007 Jacqueline K. Barton, California Institute of Technology
- 2008 Chi-Huey Wong, Scripps Research Institute, and National Taiwan University
- 2009 Richard N. Zare, Stanford University
- 2010 Peter J. Stang, University of Utah
- 2011 George M. Whitesides, Harvard University
- 2012 R. Graham Cooks, Purdue University
- 2013 Brian M. Hoffman, Northwestern University
- 2014 K. Barry Sharpless, Scripps Research Institute
- 2015 Douglas C. Rees, California Institute of Technology
- 2016 Stephen J. Lippard, Massachusetts Institute of Technology
- 2017 Jennifer A. Doudna, University of California, Berkeley
- 2018 Harry B. Gray, California Institute of Technology
- 2019 A. Paul Alivisatos, University of California, Berkeley
- 2020 Carolyn R. Bertozzi, Stanford University
- 2021 (no prize awarded)
- 2022 Cynthia M. Friend, Kavli Foundation and Harvard University
- 2023 Daniel G. Nocera, Harvard University
- 2024 David W.C. MacMillan, Princeton University
- 2025 Clifford P. Kubiak, University of California, San Diego
- 2026 Eric N. Jacobsen, Harvard University

== Death ==
Cotton died on February 20, 2007, in College Station, Texas from complications of a head injury he suffered in a fall in October 2006. He was survived by his wife, the former Diane Dornacher, whom he married in 1959, and their two daughters, Jennifer and Jane. The Brazos County Sheriff's Department opened an investigation into his death, describing his death as "suspicious".

== See also ==
- List of chemistry awards
