= Hong-Cai (Joe) Zhou =

Chinese–American chemist and academic (born 1964)

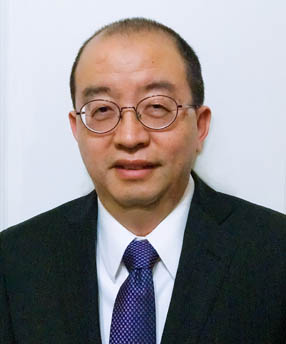
- Born: 1964 (age 61–62)
- Education: Beijing Normal University; Texas A&M University; Harvard University
- Scientific career
- Fields: Chemistry
- Workplaces: Texas A&M University
- Doctoral advisor: F. Albert Cotton
- Website: chem.tamu.edu/rgroup/zhou/

Hong-Cai (Joe) Zhou (周宏才; born 1964) is a Chinese-American chemist and academic. He is the Davidson Professor of Science and holder of the Robert A. Welch Chair in Chemistry at Texas A&M University. He serves as deputy editor of ACS Materials Letters and associate editor of the journal Inorganic Chemistry.

== Early life and education ==
Zhou was admitted to Beijing Normal University at the age of 16. After receiving his bachelor’s degree, he took up a position as a lecturer at the same university, teaching introductory chemical engineering classes. In 1996, at the age of 32, he resigned from his position to pursue further studies abroad. Zhou earned a Ph.D. in chemistry from Texas A&M University in 2000, studying under F. Albert Cotton. He was a postdoctoral fellow at Harvard University with Richard H. Holm.

== Career ==
In 2002, Zhou joined the faculty at Miami University, later receiving tenure in 2007. He received a National Science Foundation CAREER Award in 2005. In 2008, he joined Texas A&M University, and was subsequently named Davidson Professor of Science and co-holder of the Davidson Chair in Science. He also holds a Welch Chair in Chemistry at Texas A&M University (together with Karen L. Wooley).

== Research ==
Zhou's research focuses on metal-organic frameworks (MOFs) and porous materials. His work involves the design, synthesis, and application of framework materials, including hollow coordination cages, MOFs, and porous polymer networks. Research in his group explores methods for controlling structure, porosity, and functionality in these materials, with applications in gas storage, separation, catalysis, and biomedicine.

His contributions include studies on bridging-ligand substitution, ligand-fragment co-assembly, kinetic analysis and tuning, and other techniques for engineering porous structures.

Zhou has contributed to editorial work in the field, serving as a guest editor for thematic issues on metal-organic frameworks in Chemical Reviews (2012, with Jeffrey Long and Omar Yaghi) and Chemical Society Reviews (2014, with Susumu Kitagawa). He has organized symposia on MOFs at ACS meetings in 2008, 2013, and 2018.

== Honors and awards ==
Zhou's awards include a Research Innovation Award from the Research Corporation in 2003, a NSF CAREER Award in 2005, and a Cottrell Scholar Award from the Research Corporation in 2005. He received the 2006 Miami University Distinguished Scholar-Young Investigator Award, the 2007 Faculty Excellence Award from Air Products, and the 2010 DOE Hydrogen Program Special Recognition Award as a main contributor to the Hydrogen Sorption Center of Excellence. In 2014, he was awarded a JSPS Invitation Fellowship. In 2017, he received the Association of Former Students of Texas A&M University Distinguished Achievement Award in Research. Zhou has been elected a fellow of the American Association for the Advancement of Science, the American Chemical Society, and the Royal Society of Chemistry.

From 2014 to 2018, he was listed annually as a "Highly Cited Researcher" by Clarivate Analytics. In 2023, he received the Carl Friedrich von Siemens Research Award from the Humboldt Foundation.
