= Kenneth G. Caulton =

American inorganic chemist (died 2025)

Kenneth G. Caulton was an American inorganic chemist who made significant contributions to the understanding of transition metal hydrides. He was a distinguished professor at Indiana University before retiring in 2020. Specifically, Caulton worked on the chemistry of paramagnetic organometallic complexes, metal polyhydride complexes and the dihydrogen ligand, catalytic activation of carbon monoxide and carbon dioxide, and alkoxide chemistry. Caulton's work with transition metal complexes was ultimately aimed to create complexes that exhibit unexpected and novel reactivities.

Caulton received his B.S. degree from Carleton College in Minnesota. Following his undergraduate degree, he worked under Richard Fenske at the University of Wisconsin–Madison where he studied transition metal bonding with various computational methods dealing with molecular orbital theory. Caulton then worked with F. Albert Cotton at MIT, where he continued to study transition metal bonding.

== Research ==
=== Ruthenium Complexes ===
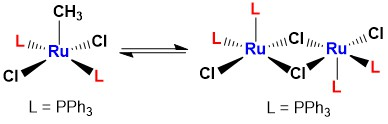
Upon dissociation of phosphine, RuCl_{2}L_{3} equilibrates with the dimer species [RuCl_{2}L_{2}]_{2}.

Caulton's early work on RuCl_{2}L_{3} complexes provided an important contribution to the class of compounds which would later become the primary precursor for Grubbs olefin metathesis catalysts.^{,} ^{,} Caulton performed early studies on the structure and dynamics of RuCl_{2}L_{3} and RuCl_{2}L_{4} (L = PPh_{3}) in solution. Caulton concluded the dissociation of a phosphine from RuCl_{2}L_{4} in solution can be significant. Previously, the structure of RuCl_{2}L_{3} had been shown to be square pyramidal. Caulton further demonstrated that RuCl_{2}L_{3} species dissociate phosphine in some organic solvents, and ultimately equilibrate with the dimer species [RuCl_{2}L_{2}]_{2}. The dimer consists of a halogen bridge between the two square pyramidal structures.

=== Transition Metal Hydride Complex ===
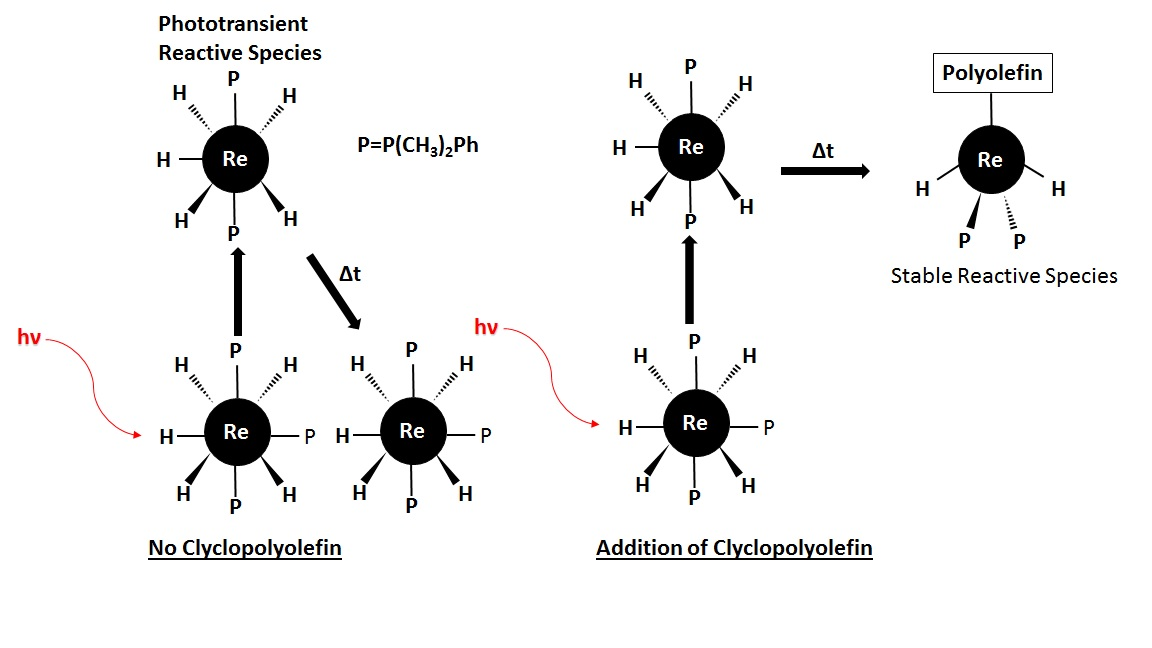
Diagram of phototransient rhenium complex after light excitation with(right) and without(left) polyolefins present

Caulton has dedicated much of his career into studying transition metal hydride complexes. Specifically, Caulton has looked at the dynamics of hydrogen, hydrides and the dihydrogen ligand and their relations to transition metal catalysis. In catalysis design, the most reactive species are often short lived and unstable. Much work has been done to better understand how to stabilize these compounds. Caulton has specifically worked on stabilizing a rhenium polyhydride. Caulton and his colleagues showed polyolefin-cyclooctatetracene can trap a phototransient intermediate of rhenium polyhydrides. This phototransient species, which is formed from excitation from light, is highly reactive, where the initial rhenium complex is not. If you could trap the highly reactive, short-lived state, then you can make a much more efficient catalyst. The end result of this was they were able to determine that the reason for this trapping of the phototransient intermediate was a result of the intramolecular hydrogen transfers and the unusual rigidity of the rhenium complex.

=== Recent work ===
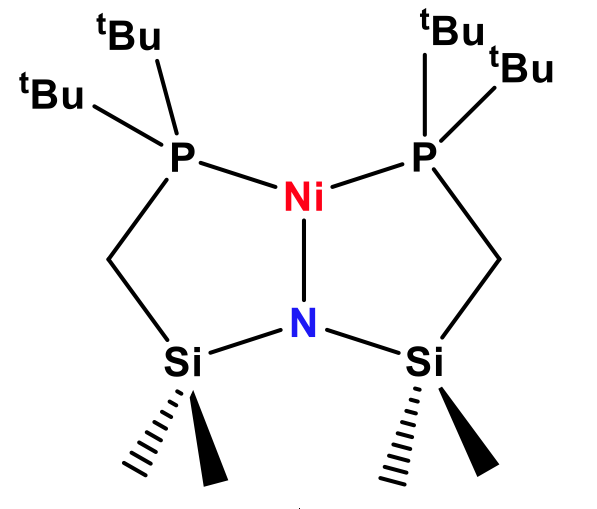
(PNP)Ni molecule

In recent years, Caulton worked on studying the reactions of small typically inert molecules with metal complexes. Notably, he synthesized a nickel complex, (PNP)Ni, and using it to cleave the C=O bond in CO_{2}. The nickel in this complex draws significance from its d9 configuration, which is similar to Cu(II), but is a stronger reducing agent. The T-shaped geometry and low coordination number of this complex suggested it would be a good reducing agent. However, Caulton's research has shown that, in spite of the one-electron reducing power of nickel, it reacts more as an amide nucleophile than as a reducing agent. Furthermore, he investigated the reaction of the same (PNP)Ni complex with a hydride group attached. This study was aimed at analyzing which ligand, the amide nitrogen or the hydride, would undergo reaction with CO_{2}. After using NMR spectroscopy to analyze the data, it was determined that the hydride ligand is inactive with CO_{2}. However, this ligand weakens the Ni-N bond, thus increasing the nucleophilicity of the amide group.

Caulton passed away on October 17th, 2025.
