= George Christou =

British-American chemist

George Christou is a British-American chemist, currently the Drago and Distinguished Professor at the University of Florida, previously the Earl Blough Professor at the Indiana University. He is also an Honorary Professor at London Centre for Nanotechnology. His current interests are in bioinorganic chemistry, materials and nanoscale magnets, and supramolecular and cluster chemistry. He was a pioneer of the field of single-molecule magnets and has been a significant figure in inorganic chemistry, with multiple papers each cited over 100 times. He has published over 600 peer-reviewed publications, with an H index of 96, and has been selected to both the Highly Cited Researchers 2014 and 2015 lists. He has received a variety of awards and honours over the years, including the recent American Chemical Society 2019 ACS Award in Inorganic Chemistry, the 2017 SEC Faculty Achievement Award, the 2016 Southern Chemist Award, and the 2016 Nyholm Prize of the UK Royal Society of Chemistry. He was named one of 15 Florida Most Influential Scientists.

== Education ==
He earned his PhD degree in organic chemistry from Exeter University. He was the NATO Postdoctoral Fellow at Stanford University and Harvard University working with Prof. Richard H. Holm.

== Selected publications ==
- Atomically-precise colloidal nanoparticles of cerium dioxide. Mitchell, K. J.; Abboud, K. A.; Christou, G. Nature Commun. 2017, 8, 1445.
- Covalently Linked Dimer of Mn3 Single-Molecule Magnets and Retention of Its Structure and Quantum Properties in Solution. Nguyen, T. N.; Shiddiq, M.; Ghosh, T.; Abboud, K. A.; Hill, S.; Christou, G. J. Am. Chem. Soc. 2015, 137, 7160-7168
- Synthetic model of the asymmetric [Mn3CaO4] cubane core of the oxygen-evolving complex of photosystem II. Mukherjee, S.; Stull, J. A.; Yano, J.; Stamatatos, T. C.; Pringouri, K.; Stich, T. A.; Abboud, K. A.; Britt, R. D.; Yachandra, V. K.; Christou, G. Proc. Natl. Acad. Sci. USA, 2012, 109, 2257-2262
- A Supramolecular Aggregate of Four Exchange-Biased Single-Molecule Magnets. Nguyen, T. N.; Wernsdorfer, W.; Abboud, K. A.; Christou, G. J. Am. Chem. Soc. 2011, 133, 20688-20691
- The Drosophila of Single-Molecule Magnetism: [Mn12O12(O2CR)16(H2O)4]. R. Bagai and G. Christou, Chem. Soc. Rev. 2009, 38, 1011-1026.
- Giant Single-Molecule Magnets: A Mn84 Torus and its Supramolecular Nanotubes. A. J. Tasiopoulos, A. Vinslava, W. Wernsdorfer, K. A. Abboud and G. Christou. Angew. Chem. Int. Ed. 2004, 43, 2117-2121
- Quantum Coherence in an Exchange-Coupled Dimer of Single-Molecule Magnets. S. Hill, R. S. Edwards, N. Aliaga-Alcalde and G. Christou, Science, 2003, 302, 1015–1018.
- Exchange-biased quantum tunnelling in a supramolecular dimer of single-molecule magnets. Wolfgang Wernsdorfer, Núria Aliaga-Alcalde, David N. Hendrickson & George Christou, Nature 416, 406–409 (28 March 2002)
- Single-Molecule Magnets. G. Christou, D. Gatteschi, D. N. Hendrickson and R. Sessoli, MRS Bulletin 2000, 25, 66-71
- High-spin molecules: [Mn12O12(O2CR)16(H2O)4]. Roberta Sessoli, Hui Lien Tsai, Ann R. Schake, Sheyi Wang, John B. Vincent, Kirsten Folting, Dante Gatteschi, George Christou, David N. Hendrickson, J. Am. Chem. Soc., 1993, 115 (5), pp 1804–1816
