= Keith A. Nelson =

American chemist

- Education: Stanford University (BS, PhD)
- Known for: Impulsive stimulated Raman scattering Terahertz spectroscopy
- Awards: Coblentz Award (1988); Ahmed Zewail Award (2012); Ellis R. Lippincott Award (2012); Bomem-Michelson Award (2017); Frank Isakson Prize (2018); William F. Meggers Award (2021)
- Scientific career
- Fields: Physical chemistry
- Workplaces: Massachusetts Institute of Technology
- Thesis: Laser induced phonon spectroscopy : optical generation of ultrasonic waves and investigation of electronic excited state interactions in condensed phases
- Doctoral advisor: Michael D. Fayer
- Other academic advisors: John P. McTague
- Doctoral students: John A. Rogers
- Website: nelson.mit.edu

Keith Adam Nelson is an American physical chemist, currently the Haslam and Dewey Professor of Chemistry at Massachusetts Institute of Technology.

== Education and career ==
Nelson studied chemistry at Stanford University and received his B.S. in 1976, followed by a Ph.D. in physical chemistry at the same university in 1981. His thesis was supervised by Michael D. Fayer. Nelson then spent a year at University of California, Los Angeles, as a postdoc with John P. McTague before joining Massachusetts Institute of Technology as a faculty member in the department of chemistry in 1982.

== Honors and awards ==
Nelson won the 2021 William F. Meggers Award from the Optical Society of America "for expanding the horizons of impulsive stimulated Raman scattering (ISRS) to the generation of intense tunable terahertz pulses, thus establishing new transient-grating techniques for a more effective application of time-domain coherent nonlinear spectroscopy in the study of condensed phase molecular dynamics".
