= Raffaella Buonsanti =

Italian chemist and material scientist

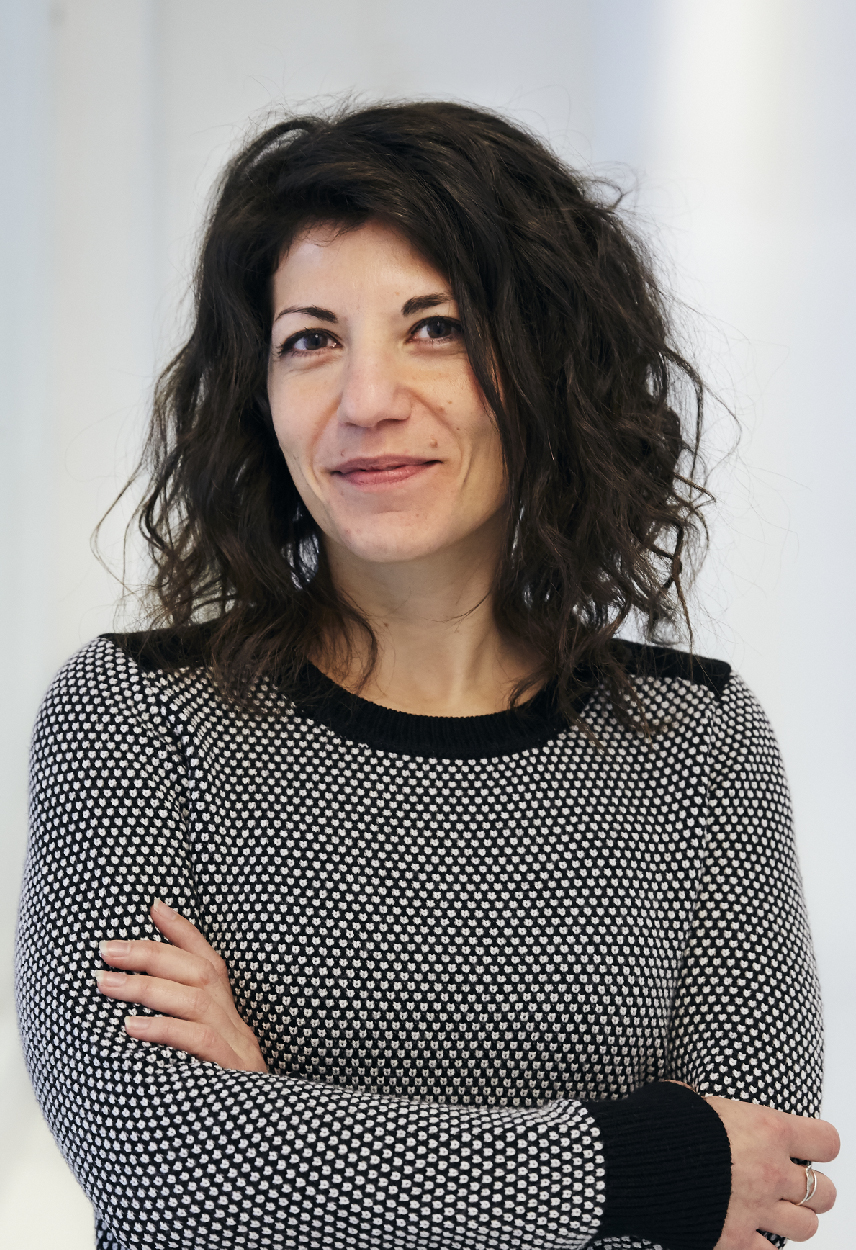
- Portrait of Raffaella Buonsanti
- Born: 1981 (age 44–45); Matera, Italy
- Known for: Colloidal inorganic nanocrystals Electrochemical CO_{2} reduction

Academic background
- Education: University of Bari; University of Salento

Academic work
- Discipline: Chemistry; Materials Science
- Sub-discipline: Nanochemistry
- Institutions: École Polytechnique Fédérale de Lausanne (EPFL)
- Main interests: Synthetic development of inorganic nanocrystals via colloidal chemistry Electrocatalysis; Nanoscience; Sustainability
- Website: https://lnce.epfl.ch

Raffaella Buonsanti (born 1981 in Matera, Italy) is an Italian chemist and material scientist. Her research is at the interface between materials chemistry and catalysis as she focuses on the synthesis of nanocrystals to drive various energy-related reactions, such as CO_{2} reduction. She is currently an associate professor at École Polytechnique Fédérale de Lausanne (EPFL) and director of the Laboratory of Nanochemistry for Energy located at EPFL's Valais campus.

== Career ==
Buonsanti received in 2006 her master's degree in chemistry from the University of Bari, Italy, with a thesis supervised by Pantaleo Davide Cozzoli and Angela Agostiano. She then joined the research group of Pantaleo Davide Cozzoli at University of Salento, Italy, and graduated in 2010 with a PhD in nanoscience. In 2010, she moved as a postdoctoral researcher to the Molecular Foundry of the Materials Science Department at Lawrence Berkeley National Laboratory, where she became project scientist in 2012. In 2013, she gained a position as tenure-track staff scientist at the Joint Center for Artificial Photosynthesis at Lawrence Berkeley National Laboratory. She was appointed as a tenure-track assistant professor at École Polytechnique Fédérale de Lausanne in 2015 and has since led the Laboratory of Nanochemistry for Energy located at EPFL's Valais campus in Sion, Switzerland. She was promoted to associate professor in 2022 and is an editor of ACS Catalysis since 2021.

== Research ==
Buonsanti’s research focuses on the interface of materials sciences and catalysis. Her interdisciplinary approach encompasses chemistry, material chemistry and chemical engineering, and aims at rendering energy technologies more sustainable. She is interested in the synthesis of novel colloidal nanocrystals that can be used as controlled and adaptable electrocatalysts for the value-added conversion of small molecule. In particular, Buonsanti's research group is keen to gain an understanding of the mechanisms of the electrochemical CO_{2} reduction reaction.

== Awards ==
- 2024 ACS Inorganic Nanoscience Award
- 2024 Russel Lecture (Queen’s University, Canada)
- 2023 Eastman Lectures in Catalysis (UC Berkeley, along with Marc Koper, William Mustain, Henry Sheldon White)
- 2021 Swiss Chemical Society Werner Price
- 2019 Thieme Chemistry Journal Award 2019 European Chemical Society Lecture Award
- 2019 Royal Chemical Society ChemComm Emerging Investigator Lectureship
- 2018 Endowed Chair from the Sandoz Family Foundation
