= Akhil Ranjan Chakravarty =

Indian organic chemist and professor (born 1953)

- Born: 20 May 1953 (age 73); Burdwan, West Bengal, India
- Education: University of Burdwan; Indian Association for the Cultivation of Science; Rajabazar Science College; Calcutta University; Texas A&M University
- Known for: Studies on reactivity and bonding in multicentered systems
- Awards: 1998 Shanti Swarup Bhatnagar Prize; 2007 CRSI Silver Medal
- Scientific career
- Fields: Bioorganic chemistry; Coordination chemistry
- Workplaces: Indian Institute of Science; Nagoya University
- Doctoral advisor: Animesh Chakravorty; F. Albert Cotton

Akhil Ranjan Chakravarty (born 20 May 1953) is an Indian organic chemist and a professor at the department of inorganic and physical chemistry at the Indian Institute of Science. He is known for his researches on reactivity and bonding in multicentered systems and is an elected fellow of the Indian National Science Academy and the Indian Academy of Sciences The Council of Scientific and Industrial Research, the apex agency of the Government of India for scientific research, awarded him the Shanti Swarup Bhatnagar Prize for Science and Technology, one of the highest Indian science awards, in 1998, for his contributions to chemical sciences.

== Biography ==
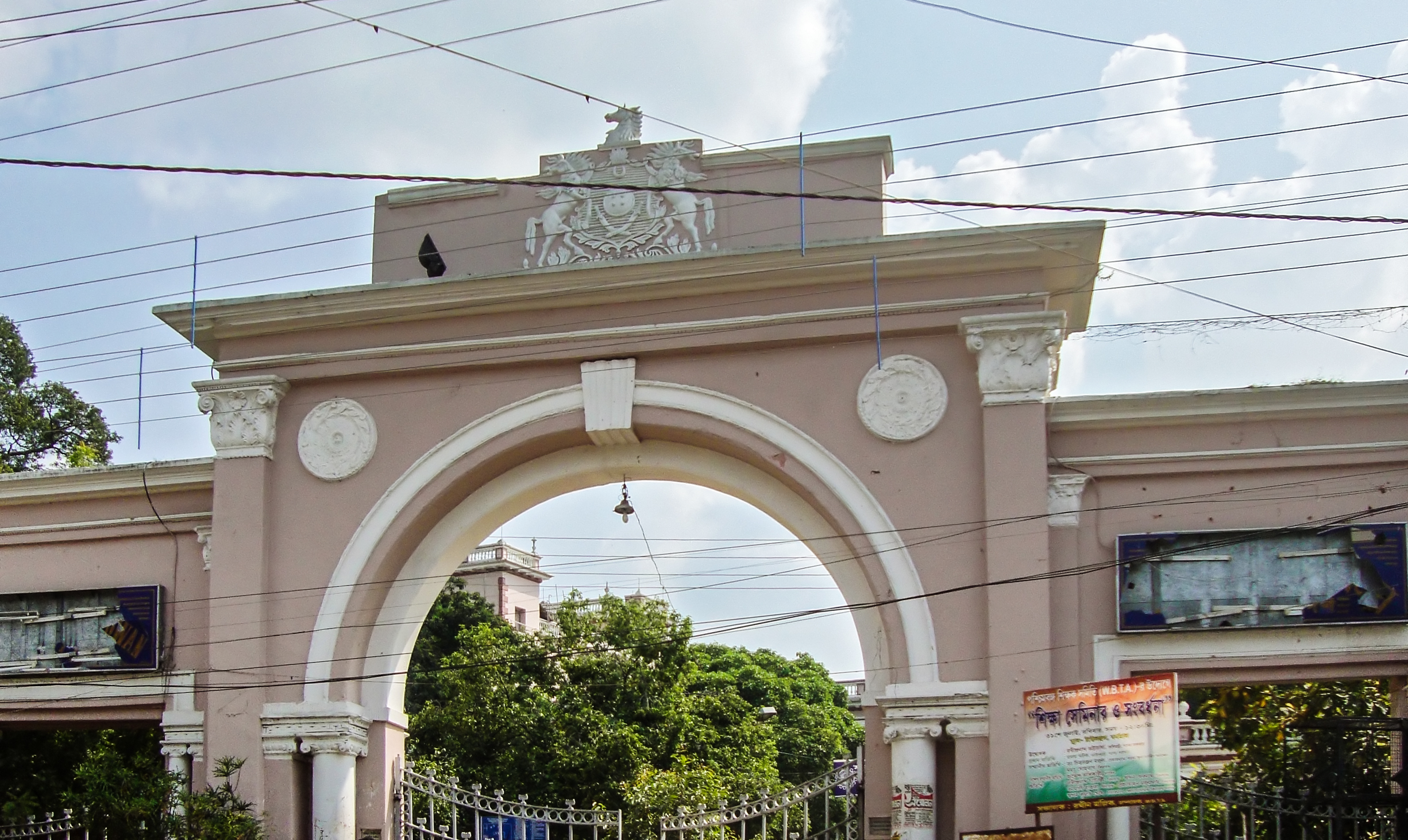
Burdwan University

A. R. Chakravarty, born on 20 May 1953 in Burdwan, a historic city in the Indian state of West Bengal, graduated in chemistry from the University of Burdwan in 1973 and completed a master's degree from the same university in 1975, passing both the examinations with first rank. Enrolling for doctoral studies at Indian Association for the Cultivation of Science under the guidance of Animesh Chakravorty, a Shanti Swarup Bhatnagar laureate, he secured a PhD from the Science College, Calcutta University in 1982. His post-doctoral studies were in the US at the laboratory of F. Albert Cotton at Texas A&M University during 1982–85 and he returned to India the same year to join the Indian Institute of Science as an assistant professor. He became an associate professor in 1997, a professor in 1997 and continues to hold the post till date. In between, he served as the chair of the department of inorganic and physical chemistry during 2002–05 and has been a visiting professor at Nagoya University.

== Legacy ==
Chakravarty's researches have been focused on coordination chemistry and organometallic chemistry of chiral complexes and his researches are reported to have widened the understanding of reactivity and bonding in multicentered systems. His work on diruthenium complexes demonstrated the link between the chemistry of complexes of basic acetate structure and multiple bonded diruthenium complexes. He established a purpose-built laboratory at IISc for his researches and furthered his researches to cover the high-nuclearity transition metal clusters showing novel structural and magnetic properties. His studies of 3d-metal-based compounds are known to be useful in developing photodynamic therapeutic protocols for treating cancer. He has documented his researches by way of articles; AceMap, an online article repository, has listed a number of them. He has mentored more than 20 doctoral scholars in their studies and has sat in the editorial board of the Indian Journal of Chemistry (Section A) and the Journal of Chemical Science.

== Awards and honors ==
Chakravarty, an Alexander von Humboldt during 1994–95, was elected by the Indian Academy of Sciences as their fellow in 1995. The Council of Scientific and Industrial Research awarded him the Shanti Swarup Bhatnagar Prize, one of the highest Indian science awards, in 1998. He became an elected fellow of the Indian National Science Academy in 2006 and received the Silver Medal of the Chemical Research Society of India in 2007. He was also a J. C. Bose National Fellow in 2008.

== See also ==
- Animesh Chakravorty
- F. Albert Cotton
