= Julie Kovacs =

American bioinorganic chemist

Julia A. Kovacs
- Born: Julia Ann Kovacs; March 15, 1959 (age 67)
- Education: Michigan State University BS (1981); Harvard University Ph.D. (1986)
- Scientific career
- Fields: Bioinorganic chemistry
- Workplaces: University of Washington
- Thesis: Vanadium-Iron-Sulfur and Molybdenum-Iron-Sulfur Cluster Chemistry (Nitrogenase) (1986)
- Doctoral advisor: Richard H. Holm
- Other academic advisors: Bruce Averill, Robert G. Bergman
- Notable students: Jason M. Shearer
- Website: depts.washington.edu/kovaclab/kovacslab/index.html

Julia A. Kovacs is an American chemist specializing in bioinorganic chemistry. She is professor of chemistry at the University of Washington. Her research involves synthesizing small-molecule mimics of the active sites of metalloproteins, in order to investigate how cysteinates influence the function of non-heme iron enzymes, and the mechanism of the oxygen-evolving complex (OEC).

== Early life and education ==
Kovacs completed her undergraduate degree at Michigan State University, graduating with a B.S. in chemistry in 1981. There, she worked with Prof. Bruce Averill on the synthesis of iron-sulfur cluster compounds, which mimic the FeMo-cofactor of nitrogenase. She then moved to Harvard University for graduate studies, and there she continued her work on iron-sulfur clusters with Prof. Richard H. Holm. Kovacs graduated with her PhD in 1986. She then moved to California to conduct postdoctoral research at the University of California, Berkeley, where she worked with Prof. Robert G. Bergman on heterobimetallic sulfur-bridged complexes.

== Research and career ==
Kovacs began her independent research career in 1988 when she joined the University of Washington as an assistant professor. She was promoted to associate professor in 1994, then further promoted to full professor in 2001. She was chair of the American Chemical Society Division of Inorganic Chemistry in 2020.

Kovacs' research involves investigations into the role of thiolates in dioxygen chemistry. Non-heme iron enzymes are known to promote biological reactions, but the mechanisms by which cysteinates impact their function are not well understood.

Kovacs is interested in the formation of the oxygen–oxygen bond. In nature, it is this oxygen-evolving complex (OEC) that stores solar energy in chemical bonds. By creating a series of small molecule analogues, Kovacs studies the radical coupling mechanism by which Mn^{IV}-oxyl radicals attach bridging oxo groups. She also investigates nucleophilic attack of Mn^{V}-oxo due to hydroxyl groups on the OEC. The small molecules include nitrogen and sulphur and a particular stereochemistry. Through synthesis of organic molecules with a variety of different molecular frameworks, Kovacs investigates their structure-property relationships and the reactivity of the resulting transition-metal complexes. Kovacs has also studied the activity of meta-stable thiolate-ligated manganese peroxo intermediates.

=== Selected publications ===
Her publications include:

- Synthetic analogues of cysteinate-ligated non-heme iron and non-corrinoid cobalt enzymes (DOI: 10.1021/cr020619e)
- Synthetic Models for the Cysteinate-Ligated Non-Heme Iron Enzyme Superoxide Reductase: Observation and Structural Characterization by XAS of an Fe^{III}−OOH Intermediate (DOI: 10.1021/ja012722b)
- Understanding how the thiolate sulfur contributes to the function of the non-heme iron enzyme superoxide reductase (DOI: 10.1021/ar600059h)
