= Delia Milliron =

Chemical engineer

- Education: Princeton University, University of California, Berkeley
- Known for: Nanoscience, Materials science
- Scientific career
- Fields: Chemistry and Chemical Engineering
- Workplaces: University of Texas at Austin
- Doctoral advisor: Paul Alivisatos

Delia J. Milliron is the T. Brockett Hudson Professor in Chemical Engineering at the University of Texas at Austin. Milliron leads a research team that focuses on developing and studying the properties of new electronic nanomaterials. Her team pursues studies on nanocrystals, nanoscale interfaces, and controlled assemblies of nanocrystals. Her team takes a systematic approach towards elucidating effects that arise at the nanoscale with a special focus on structure-property relationships.

Among many other topics, she is well known for her discoveries leading to development and innovation of technologies in the energy sciences. For her development of energy-efficient "smart window" coating technologies, Milliron is the co-founder and chief scientific officer of Heliotrope Technologies.

== Research and career ==
Delia Milliron (Markiewicz) received her A.B. in Chemistry and Materials Science and Engineering from Princeton University where she performed undergraduate research with Jeffrey Schwartz and Antoine Kahn. During her undergraduate research experiences (and internships), Milliron established an early publication record on techniques and topics spanning from magnetic force microscopy to polymer cross-linking. Milliron would go on to receive her Ph.D. in Physical Chemistry from UC Berkeley in the laboratory of Paul Alivisatos where her thesis was on "New materials for nanocrystal solar cells" (2004). Milliron's research during her early career was distinguished by studies on shape control of nanomaterials, charge transfer, and preparation of hybrid nanocrystal-polymer photovoltaic cells. After graduate school, Milliron held a post-doctoral research position at the IBM T.J. Watson Research Center and was then a research staff member at the IBM Almaden Research Center. At IBM, Milliron's publication record included studies on phase change nanomaterials and topics relevant to self-assembly of nanostructures. She also notably contributed to innovations in the field surrounding preparation of metal-chalcogen clusters and applications thereof. In 2008, Milliron transitioned to Lawrence Berkeley National Lab where she led a research team as a staff scientist in the Inorganic Nanostructures Facility of the Molecular Foundry. Milliron served as the deputy directory of the Molecular Foundry at large from 2008 to 2012. During her time at the Foundry, Milliron would continue to contribute to fundamental questions in nanoscience with technological impact. She contributed to advances in robotic nanocrystal synthesis through the development of WANDA with her then post-doc Emory Chan. And importantly for applications energy sciences, she began to explore topics relevant to innovations in window coating technology. Milliron's research continued to be distinguished by advancing fundamental knowledge in the field of nanoscience through studies on mixed ionic and electronic conductors, plasmonic nanocrystals, nanocrystal assemblies, and nanocrystal phase transitions. Milliron and her research group moved to UT Austin in 2014. In addition to her current faculty appointment at UT Austin, Milliron is a co-principal investigator for the Center for Dynamics and Control of Materials a National Science Foundation Materials Research Science and Engineering Center (MRSEC). As part of the MRSEC, Milliron is also the faculty co-leader for the internal research group on "Reconfigurable and Porous Nanoparticle Networks". In July 2025, Milliron was appointed the department chair of Chemical Engineering at University of Michigan.

== Notable publications and patents ==
Milliron has been prolific in her publication record and also in technology impact of her research which has led to over 17 patents. Listed below are some of her notable publications:

- Milliron, D. J.; Hill, I. G.; Shen, C.; Kahn, A.; Schwartz, J. (1999-12-15). "Surface oxidation activates indium tin oxide for hole injection". Journal of Applied Physics. 87 (1): 572–576. doi:10.1063/1.371901. ISSN 0021-8979.
- Alivisatos, A. Paul; Scher, Erik C.; Meisel, Andreas; Milliron, Delia J.; Manna, Liberato (2003). "Controlled growth of tetrapod-branched inorganic nanocrystals". Nature Materials. 2 (6): 382–385. Bibcode:2003NatMa...2..382M. doi:10.1038/nmat902. ISSN 1476-4660. PMID 12764357. S2CID 15921532.
- Alivisatos, A. Paul; Wang, Lin-Wang; Li, Jingbo; Manna, Liberato; Cui, Yi; Hughes, Steven M.; Milliron, Delia J. (2004). "Colloidal nanocrystal heterostructures with linear and branched topology". Nature. 430 (6996): 190–195. Bibcode:2004Natur.430..190M. doi:10.1038/nature02695. ISSN 1476-4687. PMID 15241410. S2CID 4373327.
- Jordan-Sweet, Jean; Robert M. Shelby; Raoux, Simone; Milliron, Delia J. (2007). "Solution-phase deposition and nanopatterning of GeSbSe phase-change materials". Nature Materials. 6 (5): 352–356. Bibcode:2007NatMa...6..352M. doi:10.1038/nmat1887. ISSN 1476-4660. PMID 17417642.
- Milliron, Delia J.; Jaume Gazquez; Garcia, Guillermo; Llordés, Anna (2013). "Tunable near-infrared and visible-light transmittance in nanocrystal-in-glass composites". Nature. 500 (7462): 323–326. Bibcode:2013Natur.500..323L. doi:10.1038/nature12398. ISSN 1476-4687. PMID 23955232. S2CID 4402004.
- Buonsanti, Raffaella; Llordes, Anna; Aloni, Shaul; Helms, Brett A.; Milliron, Delia J. (2011-11-09). "Tunable Infrared Absorption and Visible Transparency of Colloidal Aluminum-Doped Zinc Oxide Nanocrystals". Nano Letters. 11 (11): 4706–4710. Bibcode:2011NanoL..11.4706B. doi:10.1021/nl203030f. ISSN 1530-6984. PMID 21970407.
- L. Runnerstrom, Evan; Llordés, Anna; D. Lounis, Sebastien; Milliron, Delia J. (2014). "Nanostructured electrochromic smart windows: traditional materials and NIR-selective plasmonic nanocrystals". Chemical Communications. 50 (73): 10555–10572. doi:10.1039/C4CC03109A. PMID 24935022.
- Chan, Emory M.; Xu, Chenxu; Mao, Alvin W.; Han, Gang; Owen, Jonathan S.; Cohen, Bruce E.; Milliron, Delia J. (2010-05-12). "Reproducible, High-Throughput Synthesis of Colloidal Nanocrystals for Optimization in Multidimensional Parameter Space". Nano Letters. 10 (5): 1874–1885. Bibcode:2010NanoL..10.1874C. doi:10.1021/nl100669s. ISSN 1530-6984. PMID 20387807.
- Milliron, Delia J.; Staller, Corey M.; Dahlman, Clayton J.; Reimnitz, Lauren C.; Shearer, Alex B.; Agrawal, Ankit; Zandi, Omid (2018). "Impacts of surface depletion on the plasmonic properties of doped semiconductor nanocrystals". Nature Materials. 17 (8): 710–717. arXiv:1709.07136. Bibcode:2018NatMa..17..710Z. doi:10.1038/s41563-018-0130-5. ISSN 1476-4660. PMID 29988146. S2CID 51605386.
- Milliron, Delia J.; Truskett, Thomas M.; Agrawal, Ankit; Lindquist, Beth A.; Jadrich, Ryan B.; Ong, Gary K.; Saez Cabezas, Camila A. (2018-09-04). "Gelation of plasmonic metal oxide nanocrystals by polymer-induced depletion attractions". Proceedings of the National Academy of Sciences. 115 (36): 8925–8930. arXiv:1804.09106. Bibcode:2018PNAS..115.8925S. doi:10.1073/pnas.1806927115. ISSN 0027-8424. PMC 6130341. PMID 30127030.

== Awards ==
- Edith and Peter O'Donnell Award in Engineering, The Academy of Medicine, Engineering and Science of Texas (2018)
- Norman Hackerman Award in Chemical Research, The Welch Foundation (2017)
- Sloan Research Fellow, Sloan Foundation (2016)
- Resonante Award Winner, Resnick Sustainability Institute Caltech (2015)
- DOE Early Career Research Program Awardee for "Inorganic nanocomposite electrodes for electrochemical energy storage and energy conversion" (2010–2015)
- R&D 100 Award for Universal Smart Windows (2013)
- ~$3M ARPA-E Award for "Low-Cost Solution Processed Universal Smart Window Coatings" (2013)
- Mohr Davidow Ventures Innovators Award, CITRIS and the Banatao Institute (2010)
- R&D 100 Award for Nanocrystal Solar Cells (2009)
- Nanoscale Science and Engineering Forum Award (2023)
