= Inorganica Chimica Acta =

- Discipline: Inorganic chemistry
- Language: English

Publication details
- History: 1967–present
- Publisher: Elsevier
- Frequency: 15/year
- Impact factor: 2.545 (2020)

Standard abbreviations
- ISO 4: Inorg. Chim. Acta

Indexing
- CODEN: ICHAA3
- ISSN: 0020-1693
- OCLC no.: 2242336

Links
- Journal homepage; Online access

Inorganica Chimica Acta is a peer-reviewed scientific journal published since 1967 that covers original research and reviews of fundamental and applied aspects of inorganic chemistry.

== See also ==
- List of scientific journals in chemistry
