= John P. Fackler Jr. =

American chemist (1934–2023)

John P. Fackler Jr. (July 31, 1934 – February 25, 2023) was an American inorganic chemist.

John P. Fackler Jr. was born in Toledo, Ohio, on July 31, 1934, to parents John Fackler Sr. and Ruth Eleanor Moehring Fackler. He had two younger brothers. After graduating from DeVilbiss High School in 1952, Fackler enrolled at the Massachusetts Institute of Technology for one year, then transferred to Valparaiso University, where he completed a Bachelor of Arts degree in chemistry, physics, and mathematics. Fackler subsequently obtained a doctorate in inorganic chemistry at MIT under F. Albert Cotton in 1960.

Fackler began his academic career at the University of California, Berkeley as an assistant professor. He moved to Case Western Reserve University in 1962, where he was named to a Teagle Professorship in 1978. He left Case Western in 1983 to serve as dean of the College of Science at Texas A&M University until 1992. Between 1987 and 2006, Fackler was a distinguished professor of chemistry at Texas A&M. He was granted emeritus status in 2008. For eleven years, Fackler served as editor-in-chief of the academic journal Comments on Inorganic Chemistry.

== Scholarship ==
Fackler contributed to several distinctive themes in coordination chemistry. Early studies included Jahn-Teller Effect in Mn and Cr d^{4}-complexes. He contributed on dithiocarbamate and dithiocarboxylate complexes relevant to catalysis and redox properties. Many gold complexes were also prepared in the Fackler lab.

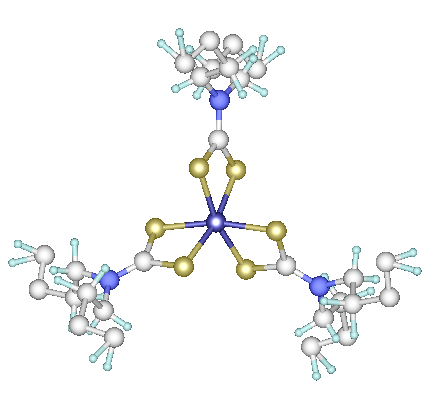
Structure of the then remarkable Ni(IV) complex of dibutyldithiocarbamate, which was characterized by Fackler et al.

== Recognition ==
Fackler was awarded a Guggenheim Fellowship in 1976. He received the American Chemical Society Award for Distinguished Service in the Advancement of Inorganic Chemistry in 2001, and was named an inaugural fellow of the ACS in 2009. Fackler was also a fellow of the American Association for the Advancement of Science (1990) and the American Institute of Chemists, as well as a member of the Royal Society of Chemistry and Sigma Xi, among other organizations.

Fackler moved to The Woodlands, Texas in 2014, and died there on February 25, 2023, aged 88.
