= Kim Renee Dunbar =

American inorganic chemist

Kim R. Dunbar
- Education: Westminster College B.S. (1980); Purdue University Ph.D. (1984)
- Scientific career
- Workplaces: Texas A&M University (1999–present) Michigan State University (1986–1999) Texas A&M University (1985–1986)
- Thesis: Redox and Carbonyl Chemistry of Dirhenium Complexes Containing Quadruple and Electron-Rich Triple Bonds (Transition Metal) (1985)
- Doctoral advisor: Richard A. Walton
- Other academic advisors: F. Albert Cotton
- Website: dunbar.tamu.edu

Kim R. Dunbar is an American inorganic chemist and Distinguished Professor of Chemistry at Texas A&M University. Her research concerns inorganic and coordination chemistry, including molecular magnetism, metals in medicine, supramolecular chemistry involving anions and anion-pi interactions, and multifunctional materials with organic radicals.

== Education and career ==
Dunbar received her B.S. in chemistry at Westminster College in 1980, followed by her Ph.D. in inorganic chemistry in 1984 at Purdue University studying with professor Richard A. Walton. Dunbar then became a postdoctoral research associate in inorganic chemistry with F. Albert Cotton in 1985–1986 at Texas A&M University, before going on to spend the next twelve years conducting research and teaching at Michigan State University, where she moved through the ranks, ultimately becoming a distinguished professor in 1998. She was recruited back to Texas A&M University in 1999, where she currently holds a Davidson Chair of Science and the Distinguished Professorship of Chemistry. Notably, Dunbar is the first female chair holder of the College of Science at TAMU.

In 2015, Dunbar received the American Chemical Society’s (ACS) Award for Distinguished Service in the Advancement of Inorganic Chemistry, the second female recipient of the ACS's top award for inorganic chemistry in its 52-year history. A leader in both chemical research and education, Dunbar is the first female Texas A&M Former Students’ Network (WFSN) Eminent Scholar Award winner. Dunbar was awarded an honorary doctorate degree from her undergraduate alma mater at Westminster College in New Wilmington in 2012. For years Dunbar has served as an Associate editor of the ACS inorganic Chemistry journal. Over the course of her career, she has contributed broadly to the development of inorganic coordination chemistry and materials science which has resulted in over 280 publications to date.

== Research ==
Dunbar's research focuses on many areas including organocyanide based functional materials, which was featured in an editorial celebrating Women in Chemistry in 2011 published in celebration of the International Year of Chemistry which was the 100th anniversary of Marie Skłodowska's Nobel Prize. Her research, which is based on her major interest in magnets and conductors, interactions with DNA in metal bonded system and conciliation by interactions in anions and aromatic ligands in supramolecular structures and properties allowed her to focus on interfaced problems of metal-based drugs in medicine, alongside synthetic challenges in biological chemistry such as supramolecular anion-𝝅 interactions.

Dunbar has extensively studied anion-𝝅 interactions, which describe the special relationship between aromatic molecules and anions. Aromatic systems normally have a high level of electron density and would repel negatively charged particles, however electron deficient ring systems specifically are able to accept the electron density of anions to form a non-covalent interaction. Some important applications of the anion-𝝅 interactions are to purify drinking water by removing nitrate and phosphate ions, catalysis, and biological purposes such as pores, membranes, and fabricated ion routes.

Trigonal-bipyramidal cyanide cluster with single-molecule magnets can provide magnetic bistability. They have unique physical properties and can be also applicable in quantum computing. Dunbar's research group focused on introducing magnetically anisotropic metal ions into clusters such as Mn^{III} ions which plays an important role in trigonal-bipyramidal (tbp) molecular geometry for determining magnetic phenomenon.

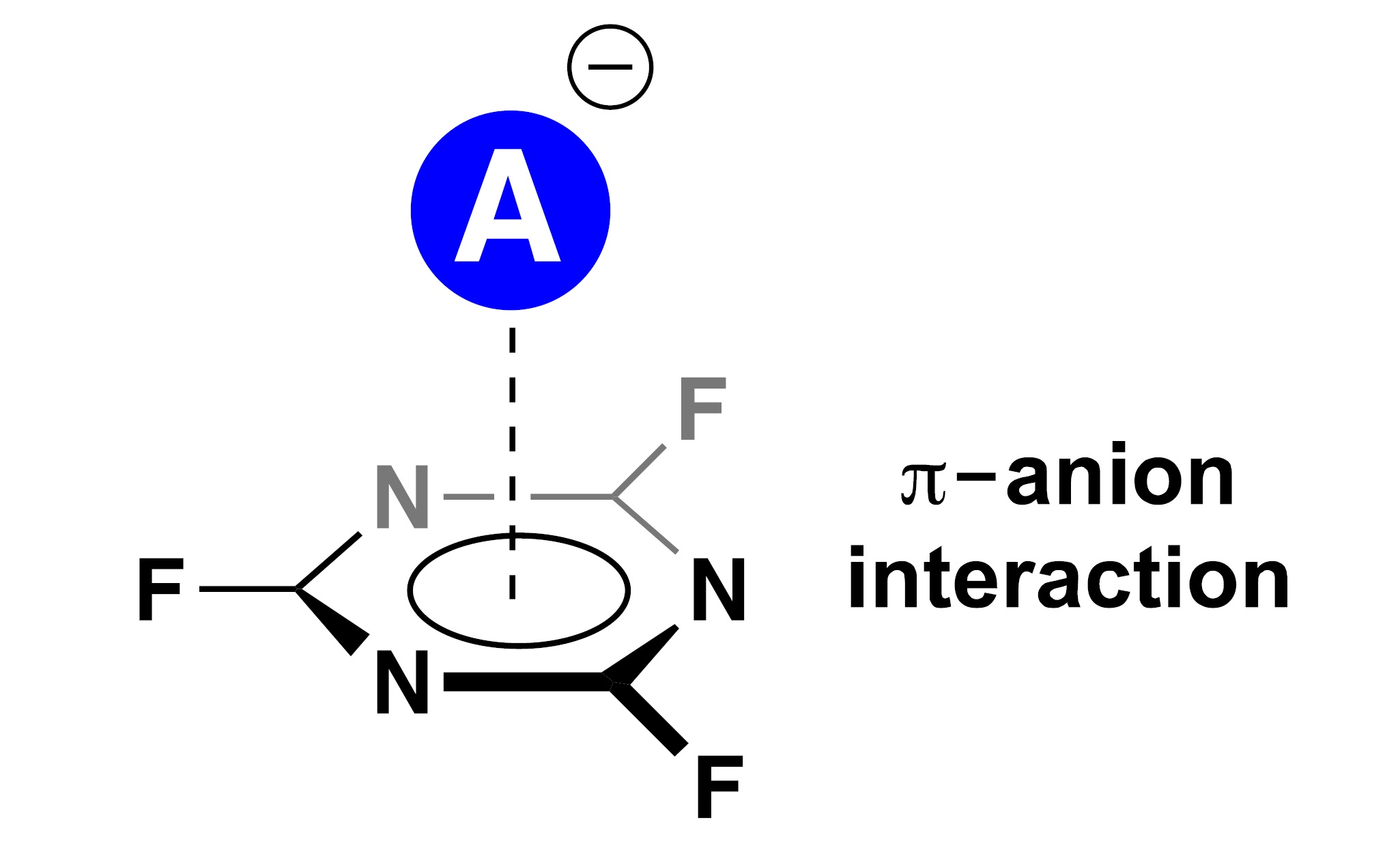
Fig 1: Dunbar is well known for her work with organo cyanide materials. Depicted in Figure 1 are the 𝝿-Anion interactions of an organonitrogen molecule

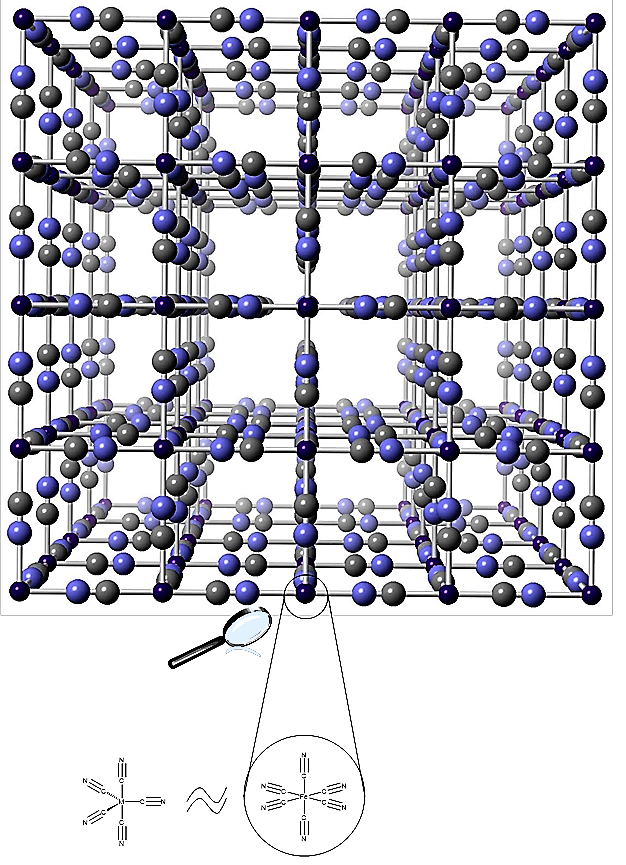
Fig 2: An area of Dunbar's research focuses on molecular magnets. Depicted in Figure 2 is a Prussian Blue analog; a trigonal bipyrimidal cyanide cluster, which shows properties of a molecular magnet, believed to have applications in quantum computing.

== Selected publications ==
1. “A Trigonal-Bipyramidal Cyanide Cluster with Single Molecule-Magnet Behavior: Synthesis, Structure, and Magnetic Properties of {[MnII(tmphen)2]3- [MnIII(CN)6]2}”: C. P. Berlinguette, D. Vaughn, C. Caada-Vilalta, J. R. Galn-Mascars, K. R. Dunbar, Angew. Chem. 2003, 115, 1561 – 1564; Angew. Chem. Int. Ed. 2003, 42, 1523 – 1526.

2. “Novel Binding Interactions of the DNA Fragment d(pGpG) Cross-Linked by the Antitumor Active Compound Tetrakis (m-carboxylato)dirhodium(II,II)”: H. T. Chifotides, K. M. Koshlap, L. M. Prez, K. R. Dunbar, J. Am. Chem. Soc. 2003, 125, 10714 – 10724.

3. “Anion-p Interactions”: B. L. Schottel, H. T. Chifotides, K. R. Dunbar, Chem. Soc. Rev. 2008, 37, 68 – 83.

4. “Unprecedented Binary Semiconductors Based on TCNQ: Single-Crystal X-ray Studies and Physical Properties of Cu(TCNQX2) X = Cl, Br”: N. Lopez, H. Zhao, A. Ota, A. V. Prosvirin, E. Reinheimer, K. R. Dunbar, Adv. Mater. 2010, 22, 986 – 989.

5. “A Remarkable Family of Rhodium Acetonitrile Compounds Spanning Three Oxidation States and with Nuclearities Ranging from Mononuclear and Dinuclear to One-Dimensional Chains”: M. E. Prater, L. E. Pence, R. Clrac, G. M. Finniss, C. Campana, P. Auban-Senzier, D. Jrome, E. Canadell, K. R. Dunbar, J. Am. Chem. Soc. 1999, 121, 8005 – 8016.

6. Heptacyanotungstate(IV) Anion: A New 5d Transition-Metal Member of the Rare Heptacyanometallate Family of Anions. Francisco J. Birk, Dawid Pinkowicz, and Kim R. Dunbar, Angew. Chem. Int. Ed., 2016, 55, 11368–11371. Frontispiece for Communications

7. A Cobalt-TCNQ Spin-Crossover Bifunctional Material with an Anomalous Conducting Behavior. Xuan Zhang, Zhao-Xi Wang, Haomiao Xie, Ming-Xing Li, Toby J. Woods and Kim R. Dunbar, Chemical Science, (Edge Article) 2016, 7, 1569–1574.

8. Cyanide Single Molecule Magnets Exhibiting Reversible, Solvent Dependent "On" and "Off" Exchange Bias Behavior. Dawid Pinkowicz, Heather I. Southerland, Carolina Avendaño, Andrey Prosvirin, Wolfgang Wernsdorfer, Kasper S. Pedersen, Jan Dreiser, Rodolphe Clérac and Kim R. Dunbar, J. Am. Chem. Soc., 2015, 137, 14406–14422.

9. Metal-organic frameworks as platforms for isolating individual single-molecule magnets in pores. Joshua B. Pyser, Darpandeep Aulakh, Xuan Zhang, Andrey A. Yakovenko, Kim R. Dunbar and Mario Wriedt, J. Am. Chem. Soc., 2015, 37, 9254–9257.

10. Optimizing the Electronic Properties of Photoactive Anticancer Oxypyridine Bridged Dirhodium(II,II) Complexes, Zhanyong Li, Amanda David, Bryan A. Albani, Jean-Philippe Pellois, Claudia Turro, and Kim R. Dunbar, J. Am. Chem. Soc., 2014, 36, 17058–17070.

== Honors and awards ==
She is the second female recipient of the ACS's top award for inorganic chemistry in its 52-year history and got the first Texas A&M Women Former Students' Network (WFSN) and an honorary doctorate degree from her undergraduate alma mater at Westminster College in New Wilmington in 2012. Her other awards include:

- ACS Award for Distinguished Service in the Advancement of Inorganic Chemistry, 2015
- 249th ACS National Meeting & Exposition for coordination compounds as magnetic and conducting materials in inorganic chemistry, Denver, 2015
- Inaugural Eminent Scholar Award, Texas A&M University Women Former Students’ Network, 2012
- Honorary Degree, Westminster College, PA, 2012
- Distinguished Achievement Award in Research, Association of Former Students, Texas A&M, 2012
- Inaugural Eminent Scholar Award, Texas A&M University Women Former Students’ Network, 2012
- TAMU Association of Former Students Award in Research, 2012
- Inaugural Distinguished Achievement Award in Graduate Mentoring, Association of Former Students, 2006
- Purdue University Department of Chemistry Distinguished Alumnus Award, 2004
- Fellow of American Association for the Advancement of Science and the American Institute of Chemist, 2004
- NSF Creativity Grant Extension Award, 1995–1996; 2002–2004
- Distinguished Alumni Award, Westminster College, 2000
- Distinguished Faculty Award, Michigan State University, 1998
- Sigma Xi Research Award, Michigan State University, 1998
- Fellow of the Alfred P. Sloan Foundation, 1992–1995
- Camille and Henry Dreyfus Teacher-Scholar Award, 1991–1995
- University Teaching Award, Michigan State University, 1990
- Sigma Xi Thesis Award, Purdue University, 1984
