= Richard H. Holm =

American inorganic chemist (1933–2021)

- Born: September 24, 1933; Boston, Massachusetts, U.S.
- Died: February 15, 2021 (aged 87); Lincoln, Massachusetts, U.S.
- Education: University of Massachusetts Amherst B.S. (1955); Massachusetts Institute of Technology Ph.D.(1959)
- Spouse: Florence Holm
- Children: Sharon Holm, Eric Richard Holm, Christian Holm, Marg Short
- Awards: Welch Award in Chemistry 2016
- Scientific career
- Fields: Inorganic Chemistry, Bioinorganic Chemistry
- Workplaces: Harvard University, University of Wisconsin—Madison, Massachusetts Institute of Technology, Stanford University
- Thesis: Spectral and Magnetic Studies of Metal Complexes (1959)
- Doctoral advisor: F. Albert Cotton
- Doctoral students: Jeremy M. Berg; Julie Kovacs; Jeffrey R. Long
- Other notable students: George Christou; Craig L. Hill; Philip Power; Lawrence Que Jr.; Omar M. Yaghi; Hong-Cai (Joe) Zhou

Richard Hadley Holm (September 24, 1933 – February 15, 2021) was an American inorganic chemist.

== Biography ==
A native of Boston, Massachusetts, Holm received his B.S. from the University of Massachusetts Amherst in 1955 and his Ph.D. from the Massachusetts Institute of Technology in 1959 under the direction of F. Albert Cotton. As an independent researcher, he joined the chemistry faculty at Harvard University in 1962. He was later on the faculties of the University of Wisconsin–Madison, Massachusetts Institute of Technology, and Stanford University prior to returning to Harvard in 1980. He was the Higgins Professor of Chemistry at Harvard.

== Research ==
Holm's research encompassed synthetic, structural, and reactivity aspects of transition element chemistry. He was best known for the preparations of the first synthetic analogs of the active sites of iron-sulfur proteins. These discoveries were significant in the development of bioinorganic chemistry. He continued his work in the field of iron-sulfur clusters until the end, examining the active sites of the enzymes nitrogenase and carbon monoxide dehydrogenase. Additionally, his interests included the biomimetic chemistry of molybdenum- and tungsten-containing oxo-transferases.

== Awards ==
His accomplishments were honored with numerous awards including the National Academy of Sciences Award in Chemical Sciences. and the F.A. Cotton Medal for Excellence in Chemical Research of the American Chemical Society in 2005. He was a member of National Academy of Sciences and the American Academy of Arts and Sciences. He is the co-recipient of the 2016 Welch Award in Chemistry along with Stephen J. Lippard.

== Personal life ==
Holm met his future wife Florence while he was in college at the University of Massachusetts Amherst, where they were pen-pals. They married upon her graduation. Holm is survived by his wife, their four children, Sharon, Eric Richard, Christian, and Marg, and five grandchildren.
