= Paul Alivisatos =

American chemist and university administrator

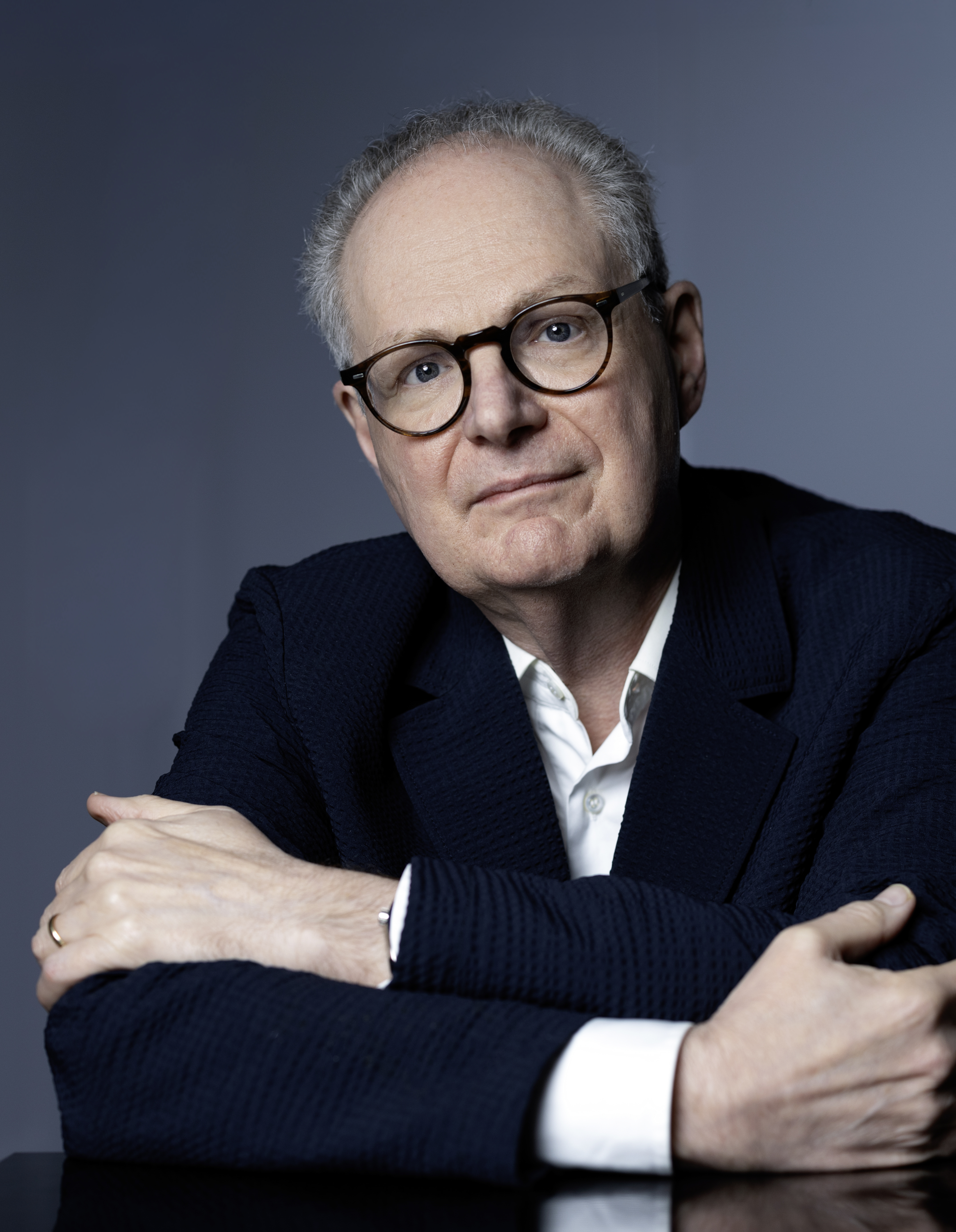
- Alivisatos in 2026

14th President of the University of Chicago
- Incumbent
- Assumed office September 1, 2021
- Preceded by: Robert Zimmer

7th Director of the Lawrence Berkeley National Laboratory
- In office January 2009 – February 29, 2016
- President: Barack Obama
- Preceded by: Steven Chu
- Succeeded by: Michael Stewart Witherell

Personal details
- Born: Armand Paul Alivisatos; November 12, 1959 (age 66) Chicago, Illinois, U.S.
- Spouse: Nicole Alivisatos
- Education: University of Chicago (BA); University of California, Berkeley (MA, PhD)
- Awards: Linus Pauling Medal (2011); Wolf Prize in Chemistry (2014); Welch Award in Chemistry (2019); Priestley Medal (2021); Kavli Prize (2024)
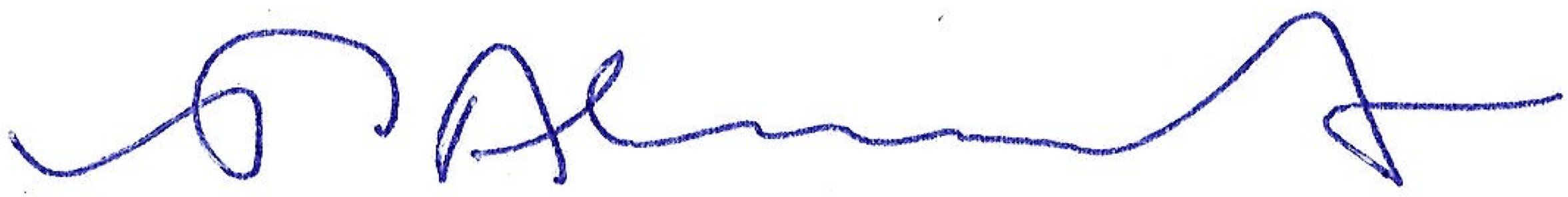
- Signature
- Scientific career
- Fields: Nanochemistry
- Workplaces: University of California, Berkeley; University of Chicago
- Thesis: The Photophysical Properties of Molecules near Metal and Semiconductor Surfaces (1986)
- Doctoral advisor: Charles B. Harris
- Doctoral students: Vicki Colvin; Delia Milliron; Sarah Tolbert
- Other notable students: Post-docs: Yi Cui; Jeffrey R. Long; Hongkun Park; Sandra J. Rosenthal

Armand Paul Alivisatos (born November 12, 1959) is an American chemist who has been the 14th president of the University of Chicago since September 2021.

Previously at the University of California, Berkeley, he served as the 7th director of Lawrence Berkeley National Laboratory from 2009 to 2016, as interim vice chancellor for research from 2016 to 2017, and as executive vice chancellor and provost from 2017 to 2021.

His academic research focuses on nanomaterials, particularly nanocrystal fabrication for biomedical and renewable energy applications.

== Early life and education ==
Paul Alivisatos was born in Chicago, Illinois, where he lived until the age of 10, when his family moved to Athens, Greece. He returned to the United States to attend the University of Chicago in the late 1970s.

Alivisatos received a Bachelor of Arts degree (with honors) with a major in chemistry from the University of Chicago in 1981 and a Ph.D. in physical chemistry from the University of California, Berkeley, in 1986. His doctoral advisor at Berkeley was Charles B. Harris. His doctoral thesis was titled The photophysical properties of molecules near metal and semiconductor surfaces.

== Career ==
After receiving his doctorate, Alivisatos joined AT&T Bell Labs working with Louis E. Brus, and began research in the field of nanotechnology.

=== University of California, Berkeley ===
Alivisatos returned to the University of California, Berkeley in 1988 as an assistant professor of chemistry. He was promoted to associate professor in 1993 and to full professor in 1995.

In administrative roles, Alivisatos served as the 7th director of Lawrence Berkeley National Laboratory from 2009 to 2016, as the university's interim vice chancellor for research from 2016 to 2017, and as executive vice chancellor and provost from 2017 to 2021.

In August 2013, he was appointed as Samsung Distinguished Professor in Nanoscience and Nanotechnology Research. He was also the founding director of the Kavli Energy Nanosciences Institute (ENSI).

==== Lawrence Berkeley National Lab ====
Alivisatos joined the Materials Sciences Division at Lawrence Berkeley National Laboratory in 1991. He served as associate laboratory director for physical sciences from 2005 to 2007. In 2008, he became deputy director, and he stepped in as interim director after Steven Chu left to become United States Secretary of Energy under the first Obama administration.

On November 19, 2009, Alivisatos was appointed 7th director of Lawrence Berkeley National Laboratory. He refocused the lab on renewable energy and climate research, oversaw new facilities, deepened ties to the national innovation ecosystem, and advanced collaborations that sped technology transfer across industries from autos to medicine. On March 23, 2015, he announced that he would step down from the directorship once a successor was named.

=== University of Chicago ===
On February 26, 2021, the Board of Trustees of the University of Chicago named Alivisatos as the incoming 14th president of the University of Chicago, with his term beginning on September 1, 2021. He succeeded Robert Zimmer, who served as the university president from July 2006 to August 2021. In addition to the office of the president, he was named the John D. MacArthur Distinguished Service Professor, chair of the Board of Governors of Argonne National Laboratory, and chair of the Board of Directors of Fermi Forward Discovery Group LLC, which operates the Fermi National Accelerator Laboratory.

On September 24, 2025, the Board of Trustees of the University of Chicago extended Alivisatos's presidency through June 2030.

== Academic research ==
Alivisatos is an internationally recognized authority on nano chemistry in the synthesis of semiconductor quantum dots and multi-shaped artificial nanostructures. Further, he is a world expert on the chemistry of nanoscale crystals; one of his papers (Science, 271: 933–937, 1996) has been cited over 13,800 times. He is also an expert on how these can be applied, for example as biological markers (e.g., Science, 281: 2013–16, 1998; a paper cited over 10,900 times). In addition, his use of DNA in this area (DNA nanotechnology) has shown the surprising versatility of this molecule. He has used it to direct crystal growth and create new materials, as in Nature, 382: 609–11, 1996, and even to measure nanoscale distances (see Nature Nanotechnology, 1: 47–52, 2006).

In February 2011, Alivisatos was ranked fifth among the world's top 100 chemists for the period 2000–2010 in the list released by Thomson Reuters.

He is widely recognized as being the first to demonstrate that semiconductor nanocrystals can be grown into complex two-dimensional shapes, as opposed to simple one-dimensional spheres. Alivisatos proved that controlling the growth of nanocrystals is the key to controlling both their size and shape. This achievement altered the nanoscience landscape and paved the way for a slew of new potential applications, including biomedical diagnostics, revolutionary photovoltaic cells, and LED materials.

=== Nanocrystals ===
Nanocrystals are aggregates of anywhere from a few hundred to tens of thousands of atoms that combine into a crystalline form of matter known as a "cluster." Typically a few nanometers in diameter, nanocrystals are larger than molecules but smaller than bulk solids and therefore often exhibit physical and chemical properties somewhere in between. Given that a nanocrystal is virtually all surface and no interior, its properties can vary considerably as the crystal grows in size.

Prior to Alivisatos's research, all non-metal nanocrystals were dot-shaped, meaning they were essentially one-dimensional. No techniques had been reported for making two-dimensional or rod-shaped semiconductor nanocrystals that would also be of uniform size. However, in a landmark paper that appeared in the March 2, 2000, issue of the journal Nature, Alivisatos reported on techniques used to select the size but vary the shapes of the nanocrystals produced. This was hailed as a major breakthrough in nanocrystal fabrication because rod-shaped semiconductor nanocrystals can be stacked to create nano-sized electronic devices.

The rod-shaped nanocrystal research, coupled with earlier work led by Alivisatos in which it was shown that quantum dots or "qdots"—nanometer-sized crystal dots (spheres a few billionths of a meter in size)—made from semiconductors such as cadmium selenide can emit multiple colors of light depending upon the size of the crystal, opened the door to using nanocrystals as fluorescent probes for the study of biological materials, biomedical research tools and aids to diagnosis, and as light-emitting diodes (LEDs). Alivisatos went on to use his techniques to create an entirely new generation of hybrid solar cells that combined nanotechnology with plastic electronics.

=== Applications ===
Alivisatos is the founding scientist of Quantum Dot Corporation, a company that makes crystalline nanoscale tags that are used in the study of cell behavior. (Quantum Dot is now part of Life Technologies.) He also founded the nanotechnology company Nanosys, and Solexant, a photovoltaic start-up that has since restarted as Siva Power. His research has led to the development of applications in range of industries, including bioimaging (for example, the use of quantum dots for luminescent labeling of biological tissue); display technologies (his quantum dot emissive film is found in the Kindle Fire HDX tablet); and renewable energy (solar applications of quantum dots).

=== Editorships ===
Alivisatos is the founding editor of Nano Letters, a publication of the American Chemical Society. He formerly served on the Senior Editorial Board of Science. He has also served on the editorial advisory boards of ACS Nano, the Journal of Physical Chemistry, Chemical Physics, the Journal of Chemical Physics, and Advanced Materials.

== Awards and honors ==
- 1991 – Alfred P. Sloan Foundation fellowship;
- 1991 – ACS Exxon Solid State Chemistry Fellowship;
- 1994 – Coblentz Award for Advances in Molecular Spectroscopy;
- 1995 – Materials Research Society Outstanding Young Investigator Award;
- 2005 – Colloid and Surface Chemistry American Chemical Society Award;
- 2006 – E. O. Lawrence Award;
- 2006 – Eni Italgas prize for Energy and Environment;
- 2006 – The Rank Prize (Optoelectronics);
- 2006 – University of Chicago's Distinguished Alumni Award (Professional Achievement);
- 2008 – Kavli Distinguished Lectureship in Nanoscience, Materials Research Society;
- 2009 – Nanoscience Prize, International Society for Nanoscale Science, Computation & Engineering;
- 2010 – Medaglia teresiana, University of Pavia;
- 2011 – Linus Pauling Award;
- 2011 – Von Hippel Award, Materials Research Society;
- 2012 – Wolf Prize in Chemistry;
- 2014 – National Medal of Science;
- 2014 – ACS Award in the Chemistry of Materials;
- 2015 – Axion Award, Hellenic American Professional Society;
- 2015 – Spiers Memorial Award, Royal Society of Chemistry;
- 2016 – Dan David Prize for nanoscience research;
- 2017 – NAS Award in Chemical Sciences;
- 2019 – Welch Award in Chemistry;
- 2020 – BBVA Foundation Frontiers of Knowledge Award;
- 2021 – Priestley Medal;
- 2024 – 2024 Kavli Prize in Nanoscience;
- 2024 – Enrico Fermi Award

In addition to those listed above, Alivisatos has held fellowships with the American Association for the Advancement of Science, the American Physical Society (1996), and the American Chemical Society. He is a member of the National Academy of Sciences, the American Academy of Arts and Sciences and the Norwegian Academy of Science and Letters.

== Personal life ==
Alivisatos is married to Nicole Alivisatos, a retired chemist, former editor of the journal Nano Letters, and daughter of the noted chemist, Gábor A. Somorjai. They have two daughters.

== Selected publications ==
- Alivisatos, A. P. (February 16, 1996). "Semiconductor Clusters, Nanocrystals, and Quantum Dots". Science. 271 (5251). American Association for the Advancement of Science (AAAS): 933–937. Bibcode:1996Sci...271..933A. doi:10.1126/science.271.5251.933. ISSN 0036-8075. S2CID 98248597.
- Hu, J. (May 3, 2001). "Linearly Polarized Emission from Colloidal Semiconductor Quantum Rods". Science. 292 (5524). American Association for the Advancement of Science (AAAS): 2060–2063. doi:10.1126/science.1060810. ISSN 0036-8075. PMID 11337589. S2CID 45130871.
- Alivisatos, A. Paul (2001). "Less is more in Medicine". Scientific American. 285 (3). Springer Science and Business Media LLC: 66–73. Bibcode:2001SciAm.285c..66A. doi:10.1038/scientificamerican0901-66. ISSN 0036-8733. PMID 11524971.
- Huynh, W. U.; Dittmer, Janke J.; Alivisatos, A. Paul (March 29, 2002). "Hybrid Nanorod-Polymer Solar Cells". Science. 295 (5564). American Association for the Advancement of Science (AAAS): 2425–2427. Bibcode:2002Sci...295.2425H. doi:10.1126/science.1069156. ISSN 0036-8075. PMID 11923531. S2CID 28606022.
- Gur, I.; Fromer, N. A.; Geier, M. L.; Alivisatos, A.P. (October 21, 2005). "Air-Stable All-Inorganic Nanocrystal Solar Cells Processed from Solution" (PDF). Science. 310 (5747). American Association for the Advancement of Science (AAAS): 462–465. Bibcode:2005Sci...310..462G. doi:10.1126/science.1117908. ISSN 0036-8075. OSTI 882752. PMID 16239470. S2CID 7380537.

For a full list of publications, see
