= Ludwig Audrieth =

Austrian chemist & soldier (1901–1967)

Ludwig Frederick Audrieth
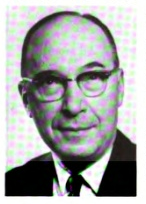
- Born: February 23, 1901; Vienna, Austria
- Died: January 28, 1967 (aged 65)
- Burial place: Mt. Hope Cemetery in Champaign, Illinois
- Spouse: Maryon Laurice Trevett Married 1937
- Military career
- Allegiance: United States
- Branch: United States Army
- Other work: chemist with 15 patents for rocket fuels

Ludwig Frederick Audrieth (February 23, 1901 – January 28, 1967) was a chemist, educator, and United States Army officer. He is known for his work on non-aqueous solvents. He co-discovered sucaryl, an artificial sweetner.

== Early life ==
Audrieth was born on February 23, 1901, in Vienna, Austria. He was brought to the United States in 1902 and naturalized as a citizen in 1912.

He received a Bachelor of Science degree from Colgate University in 1922. He received his doctoral degree from Cornell University in 1926.

== Personal life ==
Audrieth married Maryon Laurice Trevett on March 27, 1937. Together, they had three children: Karren-Laurice, Elsa Craven, and Anthony Ludwig. he died at age 65

== Career ==
Audrieth was a research assistant at Cornell from 1926 to 1928.

From 1928 to 1967, he was a faculty member of the chemistry department at the University of Illinois.

From 1930 to 1942, he served as a United States Army Reserves officer with the Chemical Corps.

From 1942 to 1946, he was a major with the Ordnance Department at Picatinny Arsenal as chief of the research division.

From 1959 to 1963, Audrieth was the science attaché at the American embassy in Bonn, West Germany.

He frequently contributed to academic journals on chemistry and received 15 patents for his work, mostly on rocket fuels.

== Selected publications ==
- Walden, Paul, and L. F. Audrieth. Salts, Acids, and Bases: Electrolytes: Stereochemistry. New York: McGraw-Hill Book Company, Inc, 1929. OCLC 1306108
- Audrieth, L. F. Decomposition of Highly Concentrated Hydrazine. Urbana: University of Illinois, 1950. OCLC 11480658
- Audrieth, L. F., and Jacob Kleinberg. Non-Aqueous Solvents; Applications As Media for Chemical Reactions. New York: Wiley, 1953. OCLC 565868
- Marvel, Carl Shipp, L. F. Audrieth, and John C. Bailar. High Polymeric Materials. Wright-Patterson Air Force Base, Ohio: Wright Air Development Center, Air Research and Development Command, U.S. Air Force, 1958. OCLC 769025533

== Death and legacy ==
Audrieth died on January 28, 1967, and was buried in Mt. Hope Cemetery in Champaign, Illinois.

His papers are held by the University of Illinois at Urbana-Champaign. He was posthumously awarded the Otto von Guericke Medal from the Association of Industrial Research Organizations of the Federal Republic of Germany in 1967.
