= Alan Campion =

American chemist

Alan Campion is an American chemist, currently the Dow Chemical Company Endowed Professor and University Distinguished Teaching Professor at the University of Texas at Austin.

== Education ==
- BA, New College of Florida, 1972
- PhD, UCLA, 1976
