= Fluorescence intermittency in colloidal nanocrystals =

Phenomenon observed in physics

Blinking colloidal nanocrystals, also known as 'Quantum Dot Blinking', is a phenomenon observed during studies of single colloidal nanocrystals that show that they randomly turn their photoluminescence on and off even under continuous light illumination. This has also been described as luminescence intermittency. Similar behavior has been observed in crystals made of other materials. For example, porous silicon also exhibits this effect.

== Colloidal nanocrystals ==
Colloidal nanocrystals are a new class of optical materials that essentially constitute a new form of matter that can be considered as "artificial atoms." Like atoms, they have discrete optical energy spectra that are tunable over a wide range of wavelengths. The desired behavior and transmission directly correlates to their size. To change the emitted wavelength, the crystal is grown larger or smaller. Their electronic and optical properties can be controlled by this method. For example, to change the emission from one visible wavelength to another simply use a larger or smaller grown crystal. However, this process would not be effective in conventional semiconductors such as gallium arsenide.

The nanocrystal size controls a widely tunable absorption band resulting in widely tunable emission spectra. This tunability combined with the optical stability of nanocrystals and the great chemical flexibility in the nanocrystal growth have resulted in the widespread nanocrystal applications in use today. Practical device applications range from low-threshold lasers to solar cells and biological imaging and tracking.

== Random behavior ==
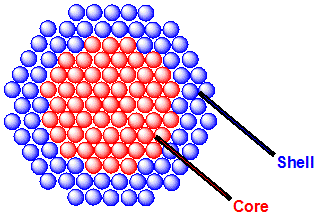
A representation of core-shell nanocrystals

Studies of single colloidal nanocrystals show that they randomly turn their photoluminescence on and off even under continuous light illumination. This tends to hinder progress for engineers and scientists who study single colloidal nanocrystals and try to use their fluorescent properties for biological imaging or lasing.

The blinking in nanocrystals was first reported in 1996. The discovery was unexpected. The consensus is that blinking happens because illuminated nanocrystals can be charged (or ionized), and then neutralized. Under normal conditions when nanocrystal is neutral, a photon excites an electron-hole pair, which then recombines, emitting another photon and leading to photoluminescence. This process is called radiative recombination. If however, the nanocrystal is charged, the extra carrier triggers a process called non-radiative Auger recombination, where exciton energy is transferred to an extra electron or hole. Auger recombination occurs orders of magnitude faster than the radiative recombination. So photoluminescence is almost entirely suppressed in charged nanocrystals. Scientists still do not fully understand the origin of the charging and neutralization process. One of the photoexcited carriers (the electron or the hole) must be ejected from the nanocrystal. At some later time, the ejected charge returns to the nanocrystal (restoring charge neutrality and therefore radiative recombination). The details of how these processes occur still are not understood.

== Solutions ==
Researchers are attempting to eliminate the problem of blinking nanocrystals. One common solution is to suppress nanocrystal ionization. This could be done, for example, by growing a very thick semiconductor shell around the nanocrystal core. However, blinking was reduced, not eliminated, because the fundamental processes responsible for blinking - the non-radiative Auger recombination- were still present.

== Characteriziation ==
One method of study attempts to characterize the blinking behavior by studying single crystals or single quantum dots. A high-NA high-magnification wide-field or confocal microscope is employed along with CCDs or avalanche photodiodes to record video. Samples must be highly diluted to single-dot concentrations. The microscope setup is normally equipped with a laser light source (of appropriate frequency to excite the dots) and a set of filters (to make sure the measured light is fluorescent emission not reflection). Another method uses ensembles or large quantities of quantum dots and develops statistical information.
