= Trevor Kletz =

British writer and chemical engineer (1922-2013)

Trevor A. Kletz
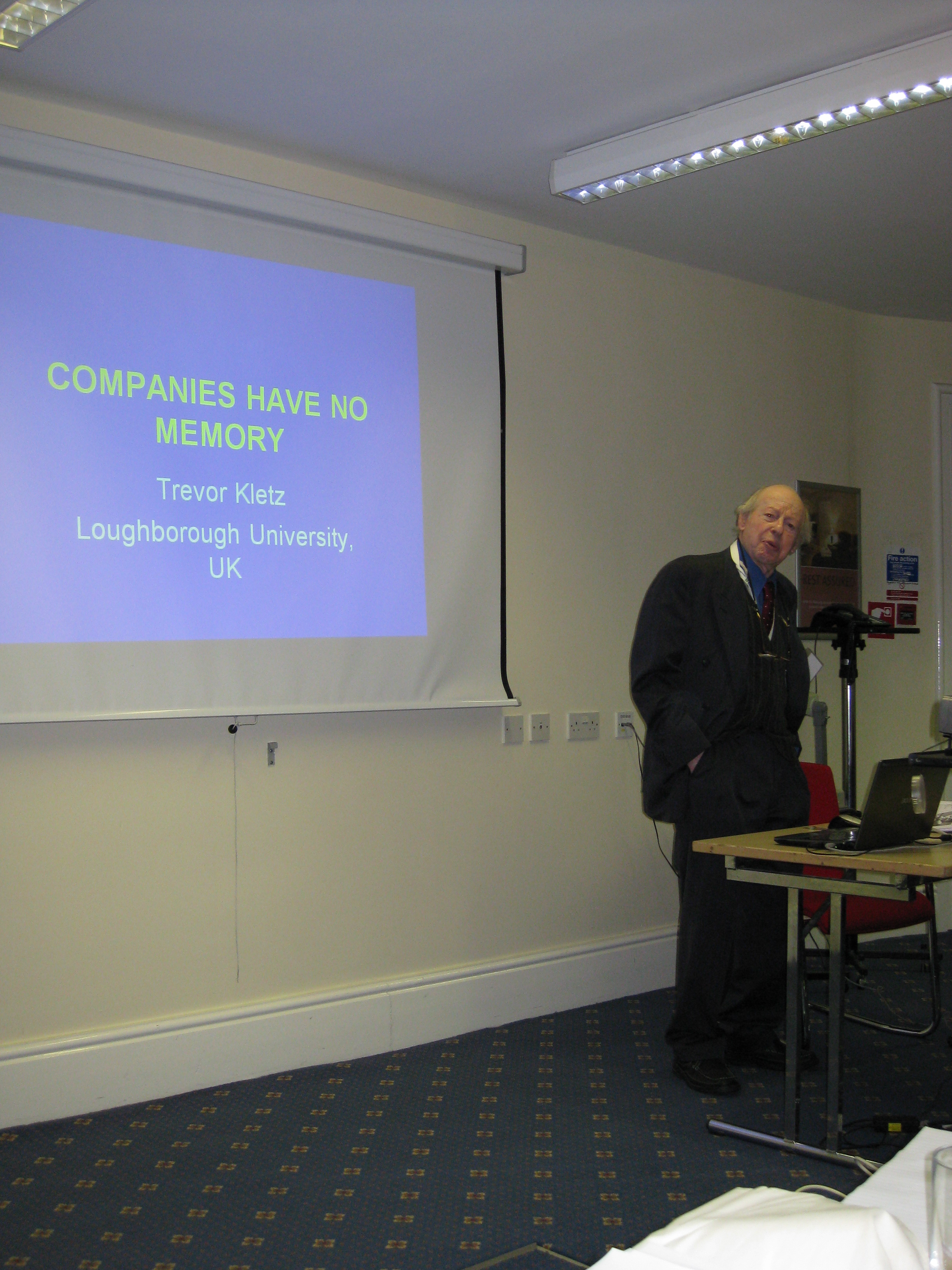
- Kletz at a chemical engineering safety workshop, Manchester 2010
- Born: 23 October 1922
- Died: 31 October 2013 (aged 91)
- Education: University of Liverpool
- Known for: Process Safety
- Awards: OBE Thr; Mond Award
- Scientific career
- Fields: Chemical Engineering
- Workplaces: Texas A&M University; Loughborough University

Trevor Asher Kletz (23 October 1922 – 31 October 2013) was a British author on the topic of chemical engineering safety. He was a central figure in establishing the discipline of process safety. He is credited with introducing the concept of inherent safety and was a major promoter of Hazop. He is listed in The Palgrave Dictionary of Anglo-Jewish History.

== Early life and education ==
Kletz was born 23 October 1922 in Darlington of Jewish parents, from a Russian immigrant background. He attended The King's School, Chester, then the University of Liverpool, where he graduated in chemistry in 1944 and joined ICI the same year. During the Second World War, he was a member of the Home Guard. On 28 October 1958 he married Denise V. Winroope (died 1980) and they had two sons, Anthony and Nigel.

== Professional life ==
In ICI he worked initially as a research chemist, then became plant manager (in turn) of iso-octane, acetone and tar acids plants. After further experience in process investigation and commissioning in the Technical Department, in 1961 he became assistant works manager on the ICI Olefines Works near Wilton, Redcar and Cleveland. In 1968, he was appointed the first Technical Safety Advisor.

During this time, ICI developed hazard and operability studies, now known as Hazop, for which he was an enthusiastic advocate, and the author of the first book on the subject.

When he retired in 1982, he had established a safety culture within the company based on communication, and had begun a second career and an international reputation as an author and speaker. He quickly started to be regarded as a central figure in the establishment and development of process safety, although he also referred to this discipline as "loss prevention" or "safety and loss prevention" until relatively late in his career. Most of his books are concerned with case studies from the industry and the human and technical causes. Shortly after his retirement he expanded a paper entitled "What you don't have, can't leak" into the book which began the concept of inherent safety.

== Honours ==
He was a Fellow of the Royal Academy of Engineering, the Royal Society of Chemistry, the Institution of Chemical Engineers, and the American Institute of Chemical Engineers. He was awarded medals by the latter two institutions.

He was a visiting Professor of Chemical Engineering at Loughborough University and an adjunct professor of the Texas A&M University Artie McFerrin Department of Chemical Engineering.

In 1997 he was awarded the OBE for 'services to industrial safety'.

In 2009 he received the Mond Award for Health and Safety of the Society of Chemical Industry, where he was said to be a 'founding father' of safety in the chemical industry.

== Books (sole author) ==
- Cheaper, safer plants, or wealth and safety at work: notes on inherently safer and simpler plants (1984) IChemE ISBN 0-85295-167-1
- Improving Chemical Engineering Practices: A New Look at Old Myths of the Chemical Industry (1989) Taylor & Francis, ISBN 0-89116-929-6;
- Critical Aspects of Safety and Loss Prevention (1990) Butterworths ISBN 978-0-408-04429-5;
- Plant Design for Safety – a user-friendly approach (1991) Taylor & Francis ISBN 978-1-56032-068-5;
- Lessons from Disaster – How Organisations Have No Memory and Accidents Recur (1993) IChemE ISBN 0-85295-307-0;
- Learning from Accidents (1994/2001) Butterworth-Heinemann ISBN 0-7506-4883-X;
- Dispelling Chemical Engineering Myths (1996) Taylor & Francis, ISBN 1-56032-438-4;
- Process Plants – a handbook for inherently safer design (1998) Taylor & Francis ISBN 978-1-56032-619-9;
- What Went Wrong? Case Histories of Process Plant Disasters (1998) Gulf, ISBN 0-88415-920-5;
- Hazop and Hazan 4th ed (1999) Taylor & Francis, ISBN 0-85295-421-2;
- By Accident… a Life Preventing them in industry (2000) PFV, ISBN 0-9538440-0-5;
- An Engineer's View of Human Error 3rd ed (2001) IChemE, ISBN 0-85295-430-1;
- Still Going Wrong: Case Histories of Process Plant Disasters and How They Could Have Been Avoided (2003) Gulf, ISBN 0-7506-7709-0
- What Went Wrong?: Case Histories of Process Plant Disasters and How They Could Have Been Avoided 5th ed (2009) Butterworth-Heinemann/IChemE ISBN 1-85617-531-6;

== Books (joint author) ==
- Trevor Kletz, Paul Chung, Eamon Broomfield and Chaim Shen-Orr (1995) Computer Control and Human Error IChemE, ISBN 0-85295-362-3;
- Trevor Kletz, Paul Amyotte (2010) Process Plants: A Handbook for Inherently Safer Design 2nd ed, CRC Press ISBN 1-4398-0455-9;
