= Michael D. Fayer =

American chemist

- Born: September 12, 1947 (age 79)
- Education: University of California, Berkeley (BS, PhD)
- Awards: Member of the American Academy of Arts and Sciences since 1999 and of the National Academy of Sciences since 2007, Arthur L. Schawlow Prize in Laser Science from the American Physical Society in 2012
- Scientific career
- Fields: Chemical physics
- Workplaces: Stanford University
- Thesis: Coherence in excited triplet states of molecular crystals (1974)
- Doctoral advisor: Charles B. Harris
- Doctoral students: Keith A. Nelson; R. J. Dwayne Miller

Michael David Fayer (born September 12, 1947) is an American chemical physicist. He is the David Mulvane Ehrsam and Edward Curtis Franklin Professor of Chemistry at Stanford University

== Education and academic career ==
He attended the University of California, Berkeley, for both undergraduate and graduate school. He received his Ph.D. in chemistry in 1974 under the supervision of Professor Charles B. Harris. Fayer began his academic career at Stanford University as an assistant professor in 1974.

== Research ==
Fayer pioneered and launched a fundamental transformation of how the dynamics and dynamical interactions of complex molecular systems are investigated. The multiple experimental approaches he initiated have changed the manner in which chemists, biologist, molecular physicists, and materials scientist interrogate key aspects of nature.

By the early 1970s, just as Fayer was beginning his career, advances in laser technology were occurring to make pulses of light that were short enough to get to the time scales of molecular motions. While Fayer contributed to laser development, his real ground breaking contributions are in the methods that we use to look at molecular motions. Even with ultrashort pulses of light, it is still not possible to look, in the normal sense of the word, at molecules moving. Fayer developed and continues to develop and apply what are called ultrafast nonlinear optical experiments to the study of molecular dynamics in complex molecular systems such as liquids, glasses, crystals, and biological systems. Ultrafast nonlinear methods involve sequences of light pulses. In a typical experiment, three pulses of light impinge on a sample, and remarkably, the nonlinear interactions in the sample give rise to a fourth pulse of light that leaves the sample in a unique direction. If the experiments are conducted with visible light, you can actually see this nonlinear production of an additional light pulse. Three beams of ultrashort light pulses go into the sample, but four beams of light come out of the sample. It is this fourth beam of light that contains the information about the sample. There are many versions of this type of experiment that Fayer developed and applied to understanding molecular materials. Depending on the timing of the pulses, the colors of the pulses, and the directions of the pulses coming into the sample, different properties can be investigated. Fayer drove the field of ultrafast optical spectroscopy through his developments and use of these new methods to explicate the properties of complex molecular systems.

Fayer's contributions can be divided into two periods. In the first, approximately 1974 through 1993, Fayer's ultrafast nonlinear experiments were conducted using visible or ultraviolet light. These were the colors that were available with the laser technology of the time. In the early 1990s, Fayer realized that a great leap could be taken if the experiments could be extended to the infrared regions of the optical spectrum. Infrared light acts on molecular vibrations, which are the motions of the atoms that make up molecules. By using infrared light, it is possible to more directly interrogate the structural dynamics of molecular systems than with the use of visible or ultraviolet light. However, a source of ultrashort infrared light pulses was necessary, so Fayer got together with Stanford physicists to turn the free electron laser to the study of molecular process using ultrafast infrared nonlinear experiments. These first experiments using the free electron laser, which was two football fields long and took a crew to run, set off an explosion of interest in infrared nonlinear methods. In less than ten years, it became possible to perform the experiments using lasers that could be housed in a normal laboratory and did not require a free electron laser. Fayer contributed substantially to the equipment side, but his main creative impact was exploiting the new ultrafast infrared methods and technology for a wide variety of fundamentally important molecular problems. These methods have evolved into what are now called ultrafast multi-dimensional infrared spectroscopy. The methods that Fayer popularized are now spread throughout the world.

== Honors and awards ==
Fayer was elected to the American Academy of Arts and Sciences in 1999 and the National Academy of Sciences in 2007.

A 1982 recipient of the Guggenheim Fellowship, Fayer has been honored with several awards from American Physical Society including the 2000 Earle K. Plyler Prize for Molecular Spectroscopy “For the development of optical and infrared ultrafast spectroscopic methods, and especially for experiments using these methods to measure dynamical processes in condensed phase systems.” and the 2012 Arthur L. Schawlow Prize in Laser Science “For seminal contributions to laser science in the development of ultrafast nonlinear and multidimensional vibrational spectroscopy.” Fayer is the recipient of the 2007 E. Bright Wilson Award in Spectroscopy by American Chemical Society "For his seminal contributions to the understanding of dynamics and excitation transport in complex condensed matter systems, through his development of ultrafast nonlinear laser spectroscopy, transient grating, and infrared photon echo techniques." He received the 2009 Ellis R. Lippincott Award by Optical Society of America “For seminal contributions to the understanding of the dynamics and interactions in liquids through development and applications of ultrafast nonlinear vibrational experimental methods and spectroscopy.” Fayer was also announced to be the recipient of the 2014 Ahmed Zewail Award in Ultrafast Science and Technology “For the development of coherent infrared spectroscopy and its applications to measurements of ultrafast dynamics in complex molecular systems.” He is also the 2022 recipient of the William F. Meggers Award from Optica and an Optica Fellow.

== Scientific education ==
In addition to his scientific research, Fayer has devoted a great deal of energy to advancing scientific education. He has written two books on quantum theory, one for teaching at the graduate level and one for laymen. His graduate quantum mechanics book, Elements of Quantum Mechanics, Oxford University Press, 2000, is an advanced introduction to quantum theory.

Fayer's book, Absolutely Small – How Quantum Theory Explains Our Everyday World, AMACOM, 2010, is a rigorous introduction to the concepts of quantum mechanics and its application to the molecular and atomic systems that are all around us, but with no math. The book is popular among non-scientists who are interested in science as well as scientists who are not in the field of molecular physics and want a conceptual understanding of quantum theory without getting bogged down with countless equations.

== Personal life ==
Fayer has been married to Terry Fayer for well over forty years, and he has two children, Victoria and William.
