= Ratan Lal Brahmachary =

Indian biochemist

Rabindra Puraskar Awardee Ratan Lal Brahmachary
- রতন লাল ব্রহ্মচারী
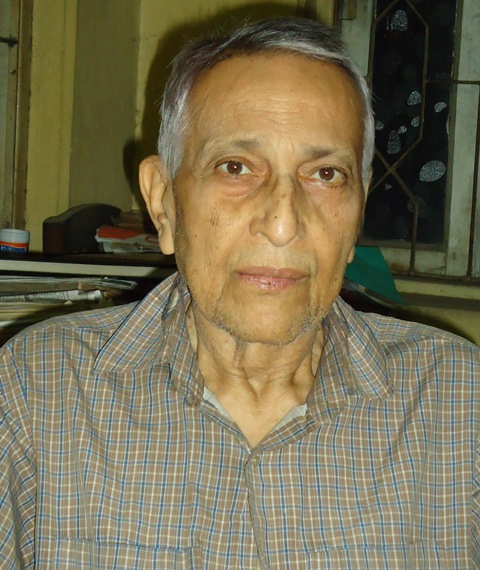
- In 2014, Kolkata
- Born: 1932; Dhaka, Bengal Presidency, British India
- Died: 13 February 2018 (86); Kolkata, West Bengal, India
- Burial place: Body donated to R. G. Kar Medical College and Hospital, Kolkata for medical research
- Education: Theoretical physics (Astrophysics), Student of Satyendra Nath Bose (University of Calcutta)
- Alma mater: Rajabazar Science College; University of Calcutta
- Occupation: Professor
- Years active: 1957-2018
- Employer: Indian Statistical Institute
- Organization: Born Free Foundation (Founder patron)
- Notable work: Study on tiger phenomenon Others work: Human pheromone; Scented and non-scented Mung bean; Solution of the Combined Gravitational and Mesic Field Equations in General Relativity
- Awards: Rabindra Puraskar
- Honours: D.Sc. from University of Calcutta in 2008

Ratan Lal Brahmachary (Note: Romanised from Bengali script: Roton Lal Bromhochari.) ( Bengali: [Ratana lāla brahmacārī])(1932 - 13 February 2018) was a distinguished scientist and a pioneer of tiger pheromone studies in India. He was widely known for his research in pheromones, although his academic background was based on physics, specifically on astrophysics under the guidance of S.N. Bose. Brahmachary made significant contributions to tiger behavioral studies, researching the animal for over 50 years. He studied many species of wildlife, notably big cats, and undertook research trips to his favourite continent, Africa, fourteen times. Brahmachary studied ethology in the Amazon basin in South America and Borneo, Indonesia with an ardent admirer of entomologist Gopal Chandra Bhattacharya. He once said in an interview

Biology is as fascinating as probing the mysteries of the physical universe. The inner universe of an organism or of an ecosystem is as challenging as the outer Universe of the expanding cosmos

He died of pneumonia on 13 February 2018 in a city nursing home in Kolkata, India. Brahmachary had pledged his body to medical research. After paying respect his body was handed over to Radha Govinda Kar Hospital authorities.

== Early life and education ==
Ratan Lal Brahmachary belongs to a Bengali Hindu family. He was born in Dhaka, Bengal, British India (now in Bangladesh), in 1932.

Brahmachary's early education was in Calcutta, Dacca, and Hamburg. He was an astrophysicist. He was a student of the eminent Indian theoretical physicist Satyendra Nath Bose. However, since 1960 he moved into biology, making significant original contributions to molecular embryology, and later, since the late 1970s, became an ecologist, studying mammalian pheromones at the Indian Statistical Institute under its founder Prasanta Chandra Mahalanobis.

== As a scientist ==
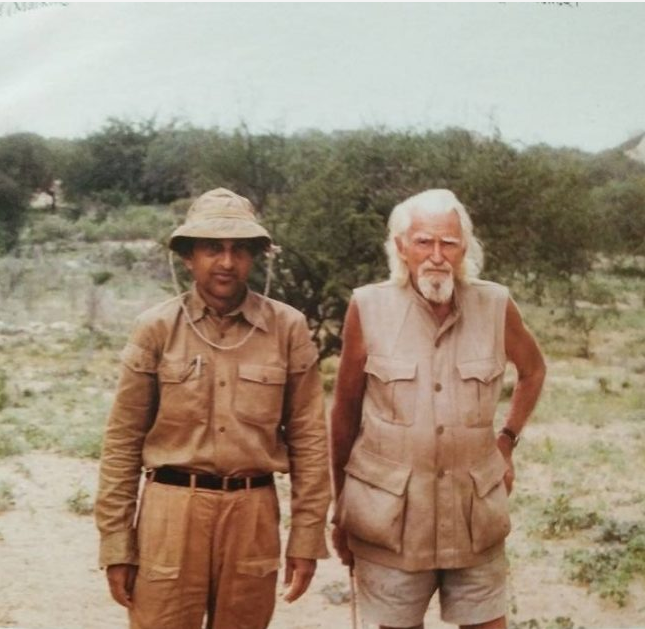
Ratan Lal Brahmachary with George Adamson in Kora National Park, Kenya.

Following a decade of work on relativistic field theory, astrophysist Ratan Lal Brahmachary joined the Indian Statistical Institute in 1957, and there he was professor in the Biology Department and a veteran tiger researcher. He did his extensive research in Marine Biological Labs in Italy, France, and other institutes in Europe.

Brahmachary's early work was on the molecular embryology of invertebrates, and in the 1970s, during a series of visits to Africa, he studied the food habits of the mountain gorilla. For more than 30 years since 1979, his major research emphasis was on pheromones of tigers and other big cats. He was interested in animal behaviour long before the subject was introduced in this part of the world. To observe wildlife, he visited Africa 14 times. He also worked in the Amazon area and Borneo and in the Mediterranean and Andaman Islands.

== Notable works ==
=== On biochemistry ===
==== Tiger pheromones ====
He was among the first scientists to observe the scent-marking behaviour of tigers, where the animals spray urine on tree branches to mark their territories and communicate via biochemical messengers. Brahmachary, along with Jyotirmoy Dutta of Bose Institute, Kolkata, made the first comprehensive approach towards understanding the nature of big cat pheromones. After years of research with Mousumi Poddar Sarkar on synthesising the chemical nature of tiger urine (marking fluid), he found out that the molecule 2 acetyl-1-pyrroline (2AP) was present in tiger urine (marking fluid) and was the very same molecule that imparts the beautiful aroma to fragrant varieties of rice like basmati.

==== Human pheromone ====
Brahmachary gave his opinion on human pheromones. In an interview he expressed

Human pheromones constitute a terribly controversial subject. Tristram D. Wyatt of Oxford has discussed this subject in detail in 'The Neurobiology of Chemical Communication.' I feel that in the distant ancestry of the human species, pheromones played a role but by now only a vestige remains.

==== Scented and non-scented mung bean ====
Mung bean is a widely consumed legume in India as well as of Asia. In India, two varieties of this bean, scented and non-scented, are available. The scented variety produces a beautiful aroma when fried, boiled, or cooked. Brahmachari researched this phenomenon with Moumita Pal and Mahua Ghosh. This study was carried out for comparison of the physicochemical and biochemical characteristics of these two varieties.

=== On physics ===
Brahmachari did a research on "Solution of the Combined Gravitational and Mesic Field Equations in General Relativity". Which was published in 1960 in Progress of Theoretical Physics.

=== Born Free Foundation ===
He was one of the founding patrons of Zoo Check. Now it is the Born Free Foundation since 1984. Brahmachary always believed that "wildlife belongs in the wild and strongly stood for compassionate treatment of animals in research". About the Born Free Foundation, he told in an interview

I am primarily a researcher, secondarily or thirdly a conservation activist. The two are inseparably interrelated. How can I study tigers if the tiger becomes extinct before completing my studies? How can the conservationists take proper steps to conserve the tiger unless we find out some principles and data through research? All said and done, the appeal for conservation nonetheless is wider because even non-scientists love the world of animals and plants. Many people do not want to kill animals or cut down trees on religious grounds. Others are learning the basic principles of ecology and doing the same.

== Books ==
He wrote several books in Bangla to promote the cause of wildlife protection and scientific observation of animal behaviour. His most notable books are listed below.

- আফ্রিকার জঙ্গলে বারো বার (Africar Jongoley Barobar) (translation in English Twelve Visits to the African Jungle)
- বাঘ সিংহ হাতি (Bagh, Shingha, Haathi) (translation in English Tiger, Lion and Elephant)

His academic book My Tryst With Big Cats is quite popular among tiger studies scholars.

A summary of his last work on tiger phenomenon was published in a book named The Neurobiology of Chemical Communication. This book edited by Carl Mucignat Caretta in 2014.

== Award ==
For his contributions to science popularisation, he received the coveted state prize of West Bengal Rabindra Puraskar. He also got D.Sc. degree from the University of Calcutta in 2008.
