= Sasanka Chandra Bhattacharyya =

Indian chemist (1918–2013)

- Born: 31 August 1918; Sylhet, Assam Province, British India
- Died: 19 May 2013 (aged 94); Kolkata, West Bengal, India
- Education: Rajabazar Science College; Calcutta University; Dhaka University; Cambridge University
- Known for: Studies on the structures and configurations of terpenoids
- Awards: 1960 K. G. Naik Gold Medal; 1962 Shanti Swarup Bhatnagar Prize; 1976 INSA Professor T. R. Seshadri 70th Birthday Commemoration Medal; 1985 IISc Platinum Jubilee Medal; 1989 IFEAT Medal
- Scientific career
- Fields: Natural product chemistry; Analytical chemistry
- Workplaces: Indian Institute of Science; National Chemical Laboratory; Indian Institute of Technology, Mumbai; Bose Institute
- Doctoral advisor: Praphulla Chandra Guha; B. Lythgoe

Sasanka Chandra Bhattacharyya (31 August 1918 – 19 May 2013) was an Indian natural product chemist and the director of Bose Institute, Kolkata. He was known for his studies on structures and configurations of terpenoids and synthesis of Vetiver Oil and natural musk. He was the vice-president of the Indian National Science Academy and was an elected fellow of the academy as well as the Indian Academy of Sciences. The Council of Scientific and Industrial Research, the apex agency of the Government of India for scientific research, awarded him the Shanti Swarup Bhatnagar Prize for Science and Technology, one of the highest Indian science awards, in 1962, for his contributions to chemical sciences.

== Biography ==
His parents, Sirish Chandra, a Sanskrit scholar and Kadambinidevi, a homemaker, came from Sylhet, a town on the banks of River Surma in the undivided Bengal of the British India (now in Bangladesh), and it was here Sasanka Chandra Bhattacharyya was born on 31 August 1918. His college education was at Calcutta University College of Science also called Rajabazar Science College from where he passed BSc in 1938 and MSc in 1940 during which time he had the opportunity to study under S. S. Guha Sarkar, a noted chemist of the time. Moving to Bengaluru in 1941, he joined the Indian Institute of Science (IISc) and did doctoral research under P. C. Guha, an organic chemist but submitted his doctoral thesis on sandalwood oil chemistry at Dhaka University in 1943 which awarded him the degree a year later. He would later enroll himself at Cambridge University in 1945 under the guidance of B. Lythgoe, a Royal Society fellow, to secure a second PhD in 1949, working on Centella asiatica, a plant used for treating leprosy. He started his career as a research chemist with Herts Pharmaceuticals but it lasted only one year (1949–50).

Returning in 1950 to India which had attained freedom by that time, Bhattacharyya joined IISc as a faculty member at their department of chemistry and when an opportunity came at the National Chemical Laboratory (NCL), he took it up to start a service which lasted a decade and a half as a senior scientific officer in 1951. At NCL, he established a new division for essential oils, with assistance from the Council of Scientific and Industrial Research where he became the founder deputy director. His next move was to the Indian Institute of Technology, Mumbai in 1966 as a senior professor where he established the Department of Chemistry and held the position of a deputy director at the time of his departure 1976. A year later, he joined Bose Institute, Kolkata as its director and served the institution till his superannuation in 1984 but continued his association with IIT, Mumbai as an honorary visiting professor.

Sasanka Bhattacharrya was married to Geeta Bhattacharyya. The couple had a son and two daughters and after the demise of his wife in 1999, he mainly lived with one of his daughters in Dehradun where he died on 19 May 2013, at the age of 94.

== Legacy ==
Bhattacharyya's research history starts from his days at Calcutta University where he studied under S. S. Guha Sarkar and the duo's work on Reagents in inorganic chemistry has returned two articles published in 1941. Later, his work with B. Lythgoe at Cambridge University focused on the anti-leprosy properties of Centella asiatica where they attempted to elucidate the chemical constituents of the medicinal herb and their researches appeared as two articles in Nature. He carried forward his researches on terpernoids in India too and worked on the synthesis of natural musk odorous compounds which resulted in the development of compounds such as muscone, dihydrocivetone, exaltone, exaltolide and ambrettolide which are reported to have commercial value. Besides, he also synthesised compounds such as jasmines, rose oxide, santalols and santalenes. One of the major contributions of the research group led by Bhattacharyya was the demonstration of the antipodal nature of constituents of Vetiver Oil. Overall, he was known to have isolated over 100 compounds falling under terpenoids and coumarins categories.

Bhattacharyya published his researches in over 250 articles (Note: Please see Selected bibliography section) and he and his team held patents for some of the processes they developed. On the academic front, he gathered a team of researchers under a new division for research on essential oils and established the department of chemistry of Indian Institute of Technology, Mumbai where he served as a senior professor for over a decade. During his career, he mentored 90 doctoral students and served as an adviser to House of Tatas. He was associated with the Journal of Indian Chemical Society as its editor (1967–70) and with Indian Journal of Chemistry as a member of its editorial board. He served in the council of the Indian National Science Academy from 1978 to 1980 and was a life member of the Life Member of Perfumes and Flavours Association of India (now known as Fragrances and Flavours Association of India).

== Awards and honours ==
Maharaja Sayajirao University of Baroda awarded Bhattacharyya K. G. Naik Gold Medal in 1960 and the Council of Scientific and Industrial Research chose him as the third recipient of the Shanti Swarup Bhatnagar Prize, one of the highest Indian science awards, in 1962. He received the degree of Doctor of Science (DSc) of Cambridge University in 1964 and two years later, the Indian National Science Academy elected him as its fellow in 1966. He received the Platinum Jubilee Medal of the Indian Institute of Science in 1985 and the IFEAT Medal in 1989. He became an elected fellow of the Indian Academy of Sciences in 1975 and was a fellow of the Indian Chemical Society. He delivered several award orations; Acharya P. C. Roy Memorial Lecture and Medal (1969) and Acharya J. C. Ghosh Memorial Lecture and Medal (1971) of the Indian Chemical Society, Professor K. Venkatraman Lecture Award of University of Mumbai (1970) and G. P. Chatterjee Lecture Award of Indian National Science Academy (1981) are some of the notable ones among them. The Indian Institute of Technology, Mumbai has instituted an award, Prof. S.C. Bhattacharya Award for Excellence in Pure Science in his honour to recognise excellence in research in pure science disciplines.

== Patents ==
- Chandra Bhattacharyya Sasanka, Ramchandra Kelkar Govind (26 July 1960). "Preparation of costus root oil and the products thereof". Patent No. US 2946783 A. United States Patent.
- Ullal Govindraj Nayak; Kamala Kinkar Chakravarti; Sasanka Chandra Bhattacharyya (15 July 1965). "Process for the preparation of Azelainsaeuremonoaethylesters". Patent No. DE 1196633 B. German Patent.

== Selected bibliography ==
- S. C. Bhattacharyya, B. Lythgoe (12 February 1949). "Triterpene Acids". Nature. 163 (4137): 259. Bibcode:1949Natur.163..259B. doi:10.1038/163259a0. PMID 18109175. S2CID 2291972.
- S. C. Bhattacharyya, B. Lythgoe (12 February 1949). "Centelloside". Nature. 163 (4137): 259–60. Bibcode:1949Natur.163..259B. doi:10.1038/163259a0. PMID 18109175. S2CID 2291972.
- S. C. Bhattacharyya, D. E. Seymour (1950). "4-Aminosalicylic acid and its derivatives. Part II. The synthesis of 4-amino-2 : 5- and 4-amino-2 : 3-dihydroxybenzoic acid". J. Chem. Soc.: 1139–1140. doi:10.1039/JR9500001139.
- J. C. Bardhan; R. N. Adhya; K. C. Bhattacharyya (1956). "Synthesis of polycyclic compounds. Part IV. Substituted 3-alkylphenanthrenes". J. Chem. Soc.: 1346–1349. doi:10.1039/JR9560001346.
- V. V. Dhekne; B. B. Ghatge; U. G. Nayak; K. K. Chakravarti; S. C. Bhattacharyya (1962). "Macrocyclic musk compounds. Part I. New syntheses of exaltolide, exaltone, and dihydrocivetone". J. Chem. Soc.: 2348–2352. doi:10.1039/JR9620002348.
- V.K. Hinge; S.K. Paknikar; K.G. Das; A.K. Bose; S.C. Bhattacharyya (January 1966). "Terpenoids—LXXXVI : Structure of epi-ψ-taraxastanonol and epi-ψ-taraxastanediol". Tetrahedron. 22 (8): 2861–2868. doi:10.1016/S0040-4020(01)99077-5.
- Sasanka Chandra Bhattacharyya (1996). "Shree Shree Ma Anandamayee as I have seen her known her" (PDF). Ananda Varta. 43.

== Trivia ==
- Bhattacharyya and his wife donated all their gold belongings to the Government of India in the wake of the Sino-Indian war of 1962 following an appeal by Jawaharlal Nehru, the then prime minister of India.
- He wrote an article, Shree Shree Ma Anandamayee as I have seen her known her, which was published in Ananda Varta, the official publication of Shree Shree Anandamayee Charitable Society of Anandamayi Ma.

== See also ==
- Terpenoids
- Vetiver Oil
- Musk
- Centella asiatica
