= Birendra Bijoy Biswas =

Indian scientist (1928–2018)

- Born: 1 March 1928; Baniyachang Village, Sylhet, Bengal Presidency, British India
- Died: 9 June 2018 (aged 90); Kolkata, West Bengal, India
- Education: University of Calcutta; University of Texas at Austin; University of Pittsburgh
- Known for: Founder Chairman of the Department of Biochemistry and former Director of Bose Institute; Molecular biology; Genetic engineering
- Awards: 1972 Shanti Swarup Bhatnagar Prize; 1974 SBCI Srinivasaya Award; UoC Distinguished Teacher Award; 2008 INSA P. C Mahalanobis Medal
- Scientific career
- Fields: Biochemistry
- Workplaces: Banaras Hindu University; Bose Institute
- Doctoral advisor: S. K. Roy

Birendra Bijoy Biswas (1 March 1928 – 9 June 2018) was an Indian molecular biologist and a geneticist. He was the Founder Chairman of Biochemistry Department and a former director of Bose Institute, Calcutta. He is known for his contributions to the metabolism of nucleic acid and the regulation of protein synthesis in plant cells. He is an elected fellow of the Indian Academy of Sciences and the Indian National Science Academy. The Council of Scientific and Industrial Research, the apex agency of the Government of India for scientific research, awarded him the Shanti Swarup Bhatnagar Prize for Science and Technology, one of the highest Indian science awards, in 1972, for his contributions to biological sciences.

== Biography ==
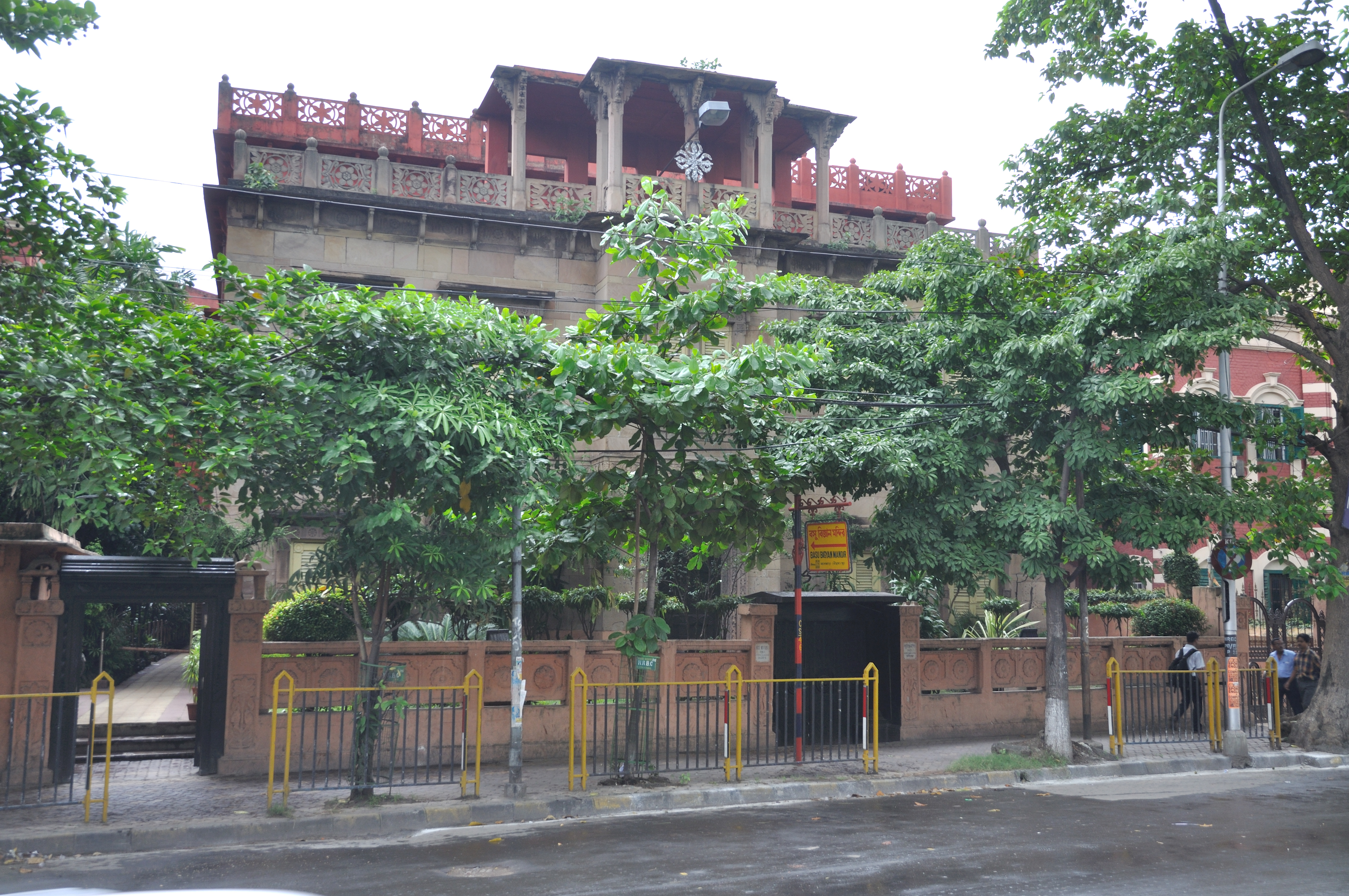
Bose Institute

An alumnus of the University of Calcutta, Biswas secured his graduate (BSc) and postgraduate (MSc) degrees in botany from the university and started his career as a research assistant at Banaras Hindu University (BHU) in 1952. He was working as a lecturer at BHU when he moved to Bose Institute in 1954. During his early years at Bose Institute, he continued his doctoral studies under S. K. Roy and secured his PhD from Calcutta University in 1957 after which moved to the US for post doctoral research. There, he worked at University of Texas at Austin under the guidance of Jack Myers and later at University of Pittsburgh under Richard Abrams. Returning to India in 1961, he resumed his service at Bose Institute as a lecturer and served the institution later as a director from 1985 to 1990.

Biswas died on 9 June 2018, at the age of 90.

== Legacy ==
At Bose Institute, Biswas pioneered the study of molecular biology and introduced the use of radioactive compounds in the investigation of metabolic pathways in 1954. While in the US, he was successful in identifying the RNA polymerase associated with the transcription and methylation processes of Ribonucleic acid in 1961. He is reported to have proposed a metabolic cycle which assisted in identifying four new enzymes and using one of those enzymes, he established that "a specific phosphoryl group could be transferred from IP6 to ADP synthezing ATP", a new pathway for ATP generation. He also proposed a protocol for the management of amoebiasis, through calcium homeostasis of Entamoeba histolytica mediated by myoinositol phosphate.

Biswas' work is known to have explained the formation and germination of seeds by elucidating the metabolic cycle involving glucose-6-P and myoinositol phosphates. His researches assisted in advancing the studies of transcription process in higher organisms. In order to further his studies, he founded a department for biochemistry and, later, established a Bioinformatics Centre at Bose Institute. There, he mentored 30 scholars in their doctoral studies and organized several science seminars. He also served as a member of the editorial board of the Indian Journal of Biochemistry & Biophysics, a National Institute of Science Communication and Information Resources (Council of Scientific and Industrial Research) publication. He has published several articles and books, detailing his research findings; Plant-Microbe Interactions, Myo-Inositol phosphates, Phosphoinositides, and Signal Transduction, Proteins: Structure, Function, and Engineering, Plant Genetic Engineering, Control of Transcription, and Biology of Inositols and Phosphoinositides are some of the notable ones.

== Awards and honors ==
The Council of Scientific and Industrial Research awarded Biswas the Shanti Swarup Bhatnagar Prize, one of the highest Indian science awards, in 1972. The Society of Biological Chemists, a science society affiliated to the Indian Institute of Science, awarded him their Srinivasaya Award in 1974 and the Indian National Science Academy (INSA) elected him as their fellow in 1977; the academy would honor him again in 2008 with the P. C. Mahalanobis Medal in 2008. The Indian Academy of Sciences followed INSA in electing him as a fellow in 1978 and he was selected by the University Grants Commission as a National Lecturer in 1986. The University of Calcutta awarded him the Distinguished Teacher Award and followed it up with the degree of Doctor of Science (honoris causa) in 2001.

== Selected bibliography ==
- H. Mondal; R. K. Mandal; B. B. Biswas (22 November 1972). "RNA Stimulated by Indole Acetic Acid". Nature New Biology. 240 (99): 111–113. doi:10.1038/newbio240111a0. PMID 4509022.
- Goutam Ghosh Choudhury; Bhabatarak Bhattacharyya; Birendra Bijoy Biswas (1987). "Kinetic and thermodynamic analysis of taxol-induced polymerization of purified tubulin". Biochemistry and Cell Biology. 65 (6): 558–564. doi:10.1139/o87-072. PMID 2892503.
- B. B. Biswas; Susweta Biswas (31 May 1996). myo-Inositol phosphates, phosphoinositides, and signal transduction. Plenum Press. ISBN 978-0-306-45221-5.
- B. B. Biswas; H. K. Das (1998). Plant-Microbe Interactions. Springer. p. 440.
- A. Lahiri Majumder; B. B. Biswas (3 October 2006). Biology of Inositols and Phosphoinositides. Springer Science & Business Media. ISBN 978-0-387-27600-7.
- B. Biswas (6 December 2012). Control of Transcription. Springer Science & Business Media. ISBN 978-1-4613-4529-9.
- B. B. Biswas; Siddhartha Roy (29 June 2013). Proteins: Structure, Function, and Engineering. Springer Science & Business Media. ISBN 978-1-4899-1727-0.
- B. B. Biswas; J. Robin Harris (11 November 2013). Plant Genetic Engineering. Springer Science & Business Media. ISBN 978-1-4613-9365-8.

== See also ==
- Bose Institute
- Protein synthesis
