= Dipankar Home =

Indian physicist (born 1955)

- Born: 11 November 1955 (age 70)
- Citizenship: India
- Awards: Homi Bhabha Fellowship; Jawaharlal Nehru Fellowship; B. M. Birla Science Prize; Darshan Vigyan Samman; INSA Medal for Young Scientists
- Scientific career
- Fields: Quantum Physics
- Workplaces: Bose Institute
- Website: www.dipankarhome.com

Dipankar Home (born 11 November 1955) is an Indian theoretical physicist at Bose Institute, Kolkata. He works on the fundamental aspects of quantum mechanics, including quantum entanglement and Quantum communication. He is co-author with Partha Ghose of the popular book Riddles in your Teacup - Fun with Everyday Scientific Puzzles.

== Research ==
Dipankar's research interests are in the following areas:

- Foundational issues of Quantum Mechanics like the Quantum Measurement Problem, Quantum Nonlocality, the Macroscopic limits of Validity of Quantum Mechanics, Time in Quantum Mechanics, and the Quantum Zeno effect.
- Nonstandard interpretations (such the Bohmian model) and the possibility of empirically discriminating them from the standard interpretation.
- Connecting various foundations aspects of Quantum mechanics with realizable experiments using Neutron/Electron/Atomic interferometry and the Quantum Optical methods.
- Fundamental features of Quantum Entanglement, including aspects of Quantum Information Transfer/Processing such as Quantum Cryptography and Quantum Teleportation.
- Applications of Quantum Entanglement and Quantum Informations in the cosmological scenario. Interplay between Black Hole Thermodynamics and Quantum Information.

== Research highlights ==
Dipankar Home is among the earliest Indian researchers initiating studies on Foundations of Quantum Mechanics that have gradually become linked with experiments, giving rise to the currently vibrant area of Quantum Information (QI). His manifold contributions include two distinctive Research-level Books: "Conceptual Foundations of Quantum Physics – An Overview from Modern Perspectives" (Plenum) and "Einstein's Struggles with Quantum Theory: A Reappraisal" (Springer) with Forewords by Anthony Leggett and Roger Penrose respectively (Appendix A), while some of the significant works with his collaborators are:

(a) An ingenious idea was formulated by invoking quantum indistinguishability leading to an arbitrarily efficient resource for producing entanglement, applicable for spin-like variables of any two identical bosons/fermions. Entanglement being at the core of QI, this work has stimulated applications of Quantum Statistics in QI processing, apart from being used in studies on free electron Quantum Computation.

(b) A hitherto unexplored use of intraparticle path-spin entanglement was conceived for empirically verifying Quantum Contextuality, subsequently tested by the Vienna group, followed recently by suggesting its information-theoretic applications.

(c) A widely cited analysis of the Quantum Zeno effect (Annals of Physics 258, 237 (1997)), preceded by the formulation of a unified framework for such effects (Physics Letters A 173, 327 (1993)).

(d) Proposed a novel experiment to show simultaneous wave and particle – like behaviour in the same setup using optical tunneling of single photon states (Physics Letters A 153, 403 (1991)), subsequently tested (Physics Letters A 168, 1 (1992)) at Hamamatsu Photonics laboratory, Japan.

(e) Conceived an innovative biomolecular example to probe the Quantum Measurement Problem (Physical Review Letters 76, 2836 (1996)), preceded by a demonstration of the quantum mechanical violation of classical realism for multiparticle systems even under strong macroscopic limiting conditions (Physical Review A 52, 4959 (1995)).

Home's research works have been cited in 19 relevant technical/popular books (Appendix B), with the total citation number of his works about 850 (ISI Web index).

== Publications ==
Books

- Dipankar Home, Andrew Whitaker: Einstein's struggles with quantum theory: a reappraisal, Springer, 2007, ISBN 978-0-387-71519-3
- Dipankar Home: Conceptual foundations of quantum physics: an overview from modern perspectives, Plenum Press, 1997, ISBN 0-306-45660-5
- Partha Ghose, Dipankar Home: Riddles in your teacup: 100 science puzzles from everyday life, illustrated by Suparno Chaudhuri, Rupa 1990

Articles

Home has 98 peer-reviewed published articles listed in Scopus. The most cited of them is Home, D., Whitaker, M.A.B., "A conceptual analysis of quantum zeno; paradox, measurement, and experiment" (1997) Annals of Physics, 258 (2), pp. 237–285.

== Awards and recognition ==
- 2011 Fellow of The National Academy of Sciences, India
- 2002 Jawaharlal Nehru Fellowship
- 2001 Darshan Vigyan Samman (Award for contributions in Philosophy of Science)
- 1995 B. M. Birla Science Prize
- 1995 Associate Membership of the International Centre for Theoretical Physics, Trieste, Italy
- 1993 Homi Bhabha Fellowship
- 1990 Commission of the European Community Fellowship
- 1987 Associateship of the Indian Academy of Sciences
- 1986 Indian National Science Academy (INSA) Medal for Young Scientists
