= Partha Ghose =

Indian physicist, author, philosopher and musician (born 1939)

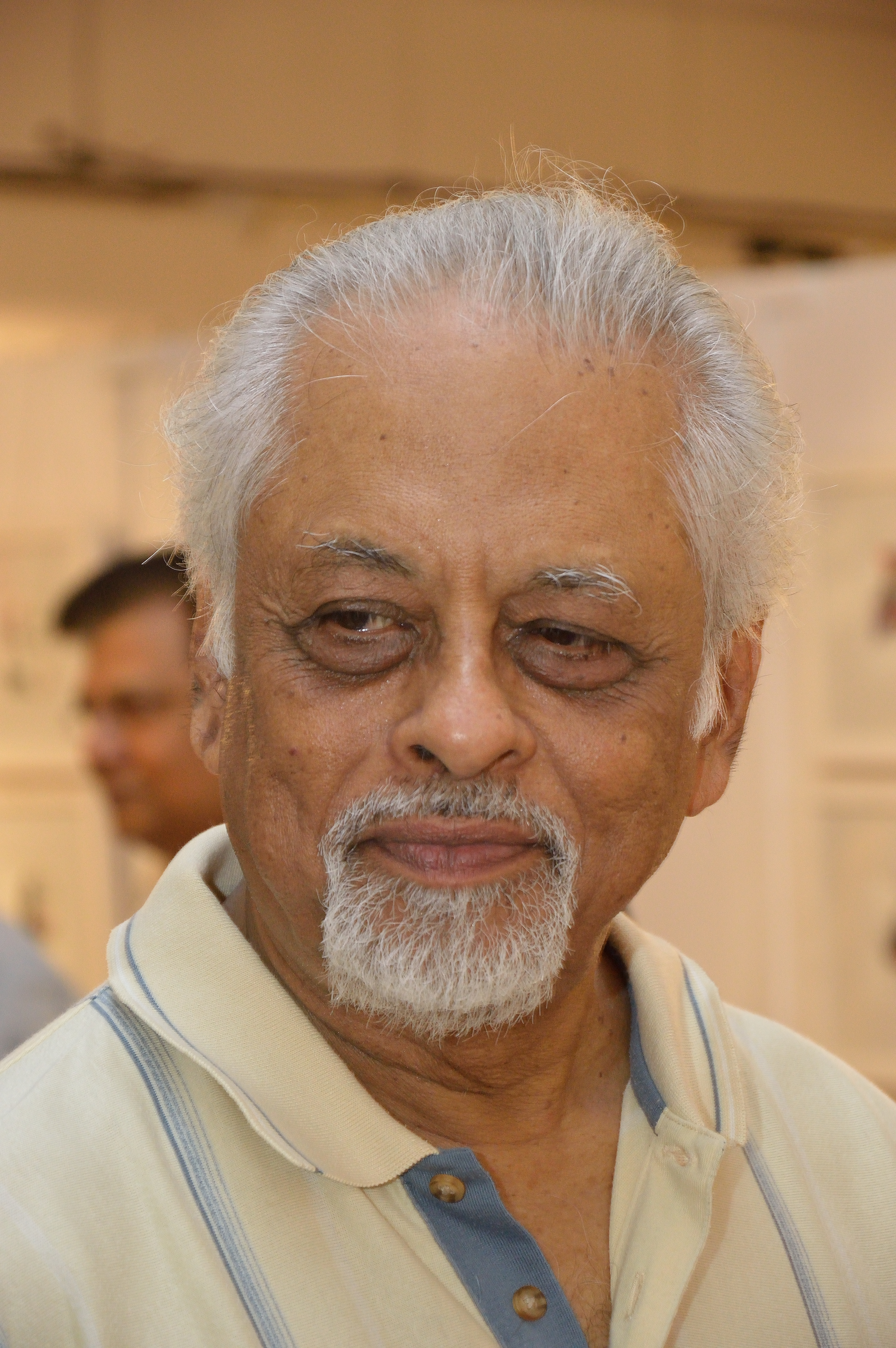
- Ghose in 2015
- Education: Rajabazar Science College
- Occupations: Physicist, author, anchorperson
- Scientific career
- Workplaces: S.N. Bose National Centre for Basic Sciences

Partha Ghose FNASc (born 1939) is an Indian physicist, author, philosopher, musician and former professor at the S.N. Bose National Centre for Basic Sciences in Kolkata. He is the former chairman of Satyajit Ray Film and Television Institute, Kolkata and a member of the board of trustees of the Academy of Fine Arts, Kolkata.

== Life and works ==
Partha Ghose is one of India's best known popularizers of modern science. He has written influential papers and books on physics as well as popular books on science. He was an anchorperson in the popular Indian TV shows Quest and Eureka. He has directed plays and appeared in media programmes and films including the National Award-winning film 'The Quantum Indians', which is about great Indian scientists Satyendranath Bose, C. V. Raman and Meghnad Saha.

Ghose received the National Award for the Best Science and Technology coverage in the Mass Media of the National Council for Science and Technology Communication (NCSTC) for the period 1986–1990. He was also awarded the Indira Gandhi Prize for the popularization of science by the Indian National Science Academy.

He is best known in the physics world for his significant contributions to theoretical physics, particularly the foundations of quantum mechanics.

(i) His paper in collaboration with D. Home and G. S. Agarwal (the GHA experiment) in unraveling the nature of wave–particle duality in single-photon experiments led to its experimental verification by Y. Mizobuchi and Y. Ohtake in Japan and later by M. Genovese and collaborators in Italy. This work has been widely referred to and has found place even in popular texts.,

(ii) His work on Bohmian trajectories of photons formed the basis for a comparison of these trajectories from those that were later observed experimentally with weak measurements.

(iii) He has also made a pioneering contribution by showing that 'entanglement' can occur in classical polarization optics resulting in violations of Bell-like inequalities hitherto believed to be exclusive to quantum systems. This has led to many investigations and experiments confirming such violations and consequently to a shifting of the boundary between quantum and classical physics.

Ghose's exposition of Rabindranath Tagore’s philosophy and music has found expression in several scholarly papers. He served as the Hon. Secretary of the Visva-Bharati Music Board for a few years.

He also served as a member of the Working Group on National Language Policy, Knowledge Commission, Govt of India.

== Awards ==
- ABP Ananda Sera Bangali Award: 2022
