= Siva Brata Bhattacherjee =

Physicist (1921–2003)

- Bhattacherjee in Calcutta.
- Known for: X-ray crystallography
- Spouse: Lilabati Bhattacharjee
- Children: 2
- Scientific career
- Fields: Physics
- Institutions: Rajabazar Science College, University of Calcutta, University of Manchester Institute of Science and Technology
- Doctoral advisor: Satyendra Nath Bose

Siva Brata Bhattacherjee (1921–2003)—sometimes spelt Sibabrata Bhattacherjee—was a professor of physics at the University of Calcutta. He studied with the physicist, Satyendra Nath Bose, under whose supervision he completed his doctoral thesis in solid-state physics at the University College of Science (commonly known as Rajabazar Science College).

In 1945, he came from the University of Dhaka to join the Khaira Laboratory of Physics at the Science College, and specialised in the field of X-ray crystallography. Dr Bhattacherjee also served as a faculty member of the Department of Technology at the erstwhile University of Manchester Institute of Science and Technology.

He was married to Lilabati Bhattacharjee, Director (Mineral Physics) of the Geological Survey of India. Siva Brata is survived by their son Dr Subrata Bhattacherjee, and daughter Mrs Sonali Karmakar née Bhattacherjee.
