= Lilabati Bhattacharjee =

Indian physicist

- Education: University of Calcutta
- Known for: Structural crystallography, topography.
- Spouse: Siva Brata Bhattacherjee
- Children: 2
- Scientific career
- Fields: Physics
- Workplaces: Geological Survey of India University of Manchester Institute of Science and Technology
- Academic advisors: Satyendra Nath Bose

Lilabati Bhattacharjee (née Ray) was a mineralogist, crystallographer and a physicist. She studied with the scientist Satyendra Nath Bose, and completed her MSc in physics from the University College of Science and Technology (commonly known as Rajabazar Science College), University of Calcutta in 1951.

Mrs Bhattacharjee worked in the fields of structural crystallography, optical transform methods, computer programming, phase transformations, crystal growth, topography, and instrumentation. She served as a Senior Mineralogist at the Geological Survey of India, and later went on to become its Director (Mineral Physics). She was married to Siva Brata Bhattacherjee, and is survived by two children and two grandsons.
