= Probir Roy =

Indian particle physicist (1942-2026)

- Born: 4 October 1942; Calcutta, Bengal, British India
- Died: 30 May 2026 (aged 83); Kolkata, West Bengal
- Education: University of Calcutta; King's College, Cambridge; Stanford University; Cornell University; CERN
- Known for: Studies on lepton-hadron-photon processes and two-photon processes
- Awards: 1987 Shanti Swarup Bhatnagar Prize
- Scientific career
- Fields: Particle physics; Field theory; Phenomenology
- Workplaces: Tata Institute of Fundamental Research; Saha Institute of Nuclear Physics; Bose Institute; Oxford University; University of Texas at Austin; University of California, Riverside; University of Hawaii at Manoa; University of Helsinki; Kavli Institute for Theoretical Physics
- Doctoral advisor: S. M. Berman; Toichiro Kinoshita; Kenneth G. Wilson

Probir Roy (4 October 1942 - 30 May 2026) was an Indian particle physicist and a former professor at Tata Institute of Fundamental Research. He was also a senior scientist of the Indian National Science Academy at Bose Institute and a former Raja Ramanna fellow of Department of Atomic Energy at Saha Institute of Nuclear Physics.

Known for the development of a sum rule on two-photon processes, Roy was an elected fellow of all the three major Indian science academies – Indian Academy of Sciences, Indian National Science Academy and National Academy of Sciences, India – as well as of the American Physical Society. The Council of Scientific and Industrial Research, the apex agency of the Government of India for scientific research, awarded Roy the Shanti Swarup Bhatnagar Prize for Science and Technology, one of the highest Indian science awards, for his contributions to physical sciences in 1987. (Note: Long link – please select award year to see details)

== Biography ==
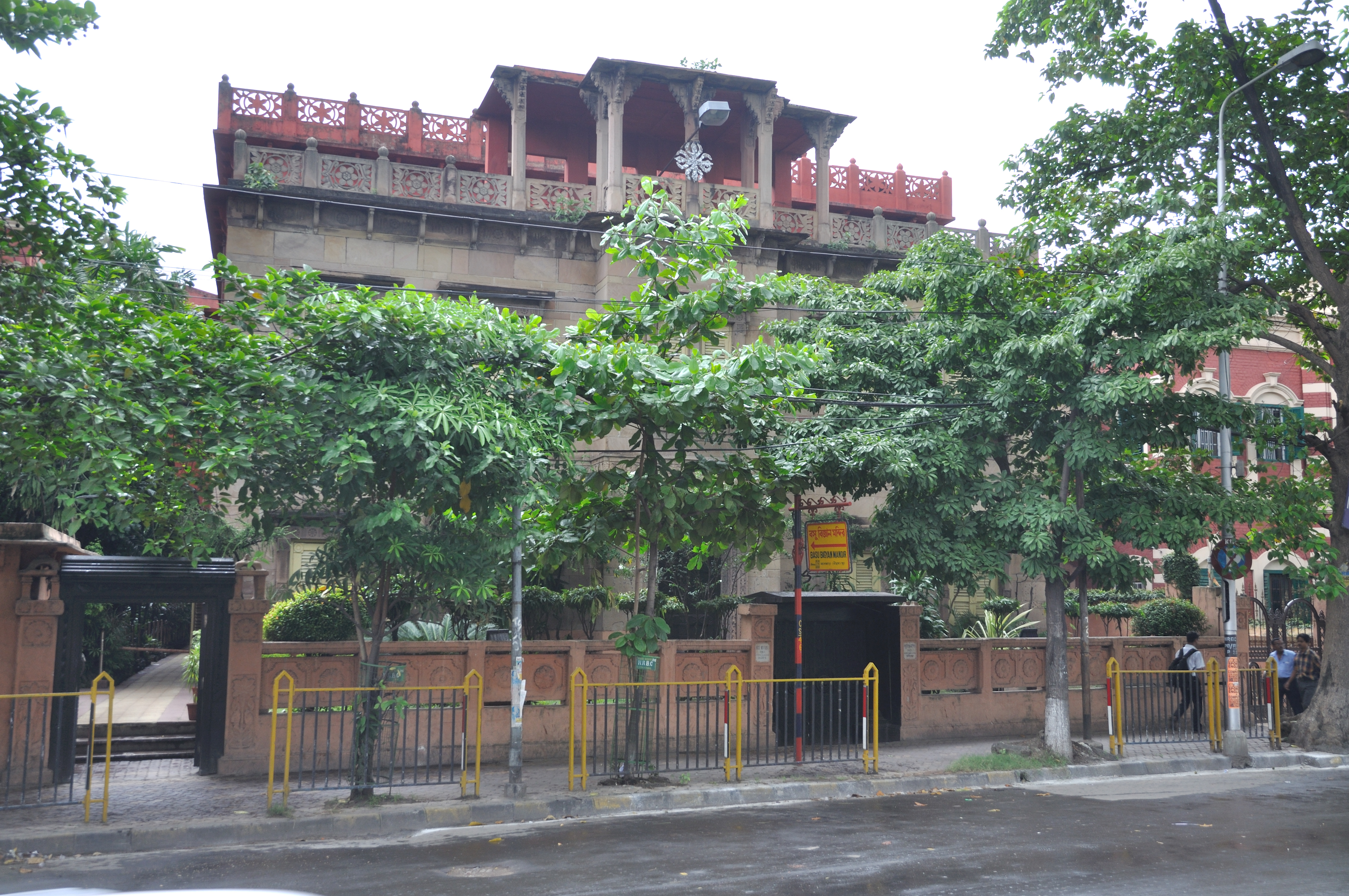
Bose Institute, Kolkata

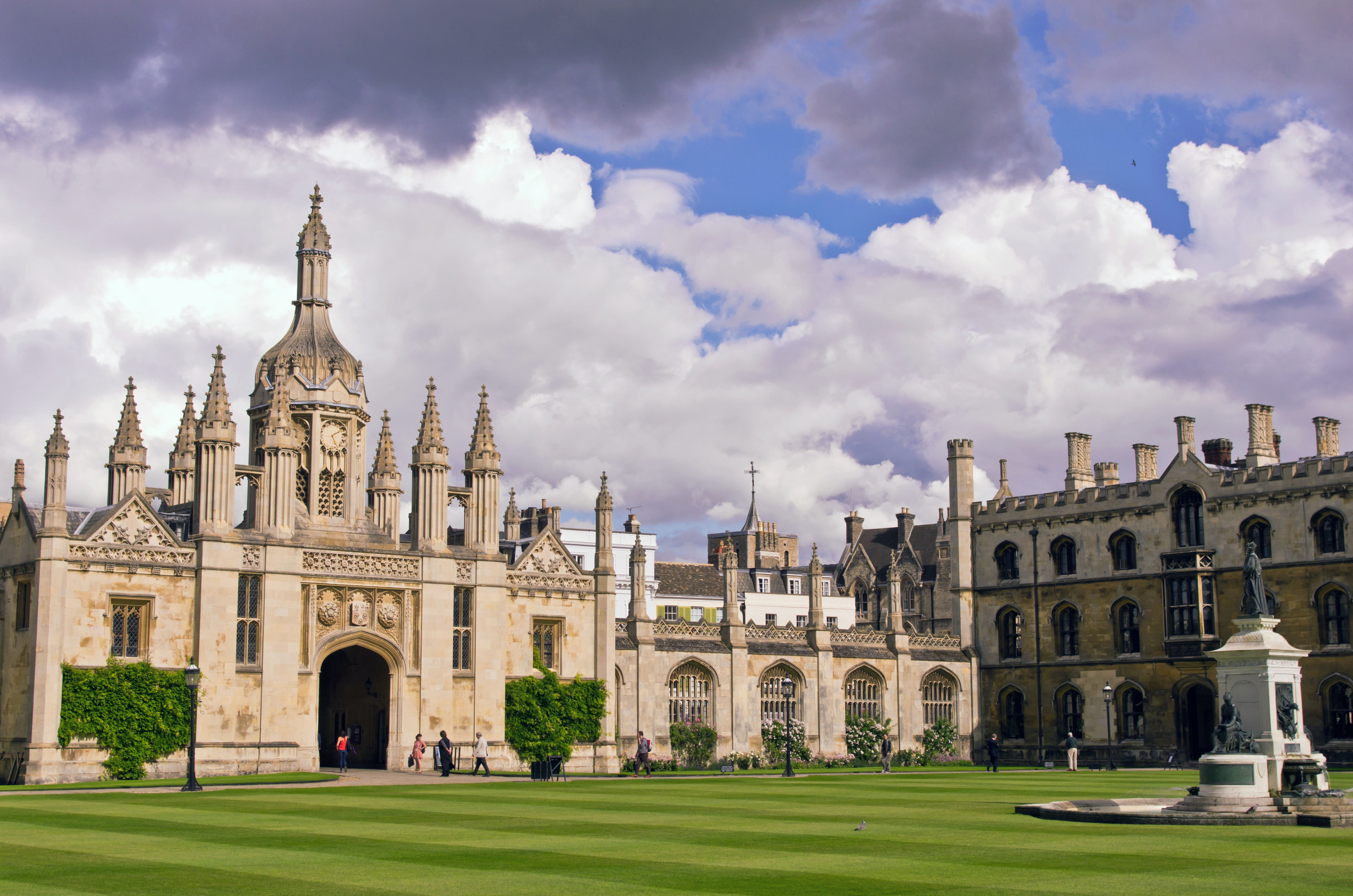
King's College, Cambridge

Born on 4 October 1942 into a Bengali Kayastha family at Calcutta in the Bengal state of British India to Kiran Lal Roy-Sujata Sikdar couple, Probir Roy graduated in physics with honours from Presidency College under Calcutta University in 1962 before moving to Cambridge University to obtain an MA (Cantab) from King's College, Cambridge in 1965. Subsequently, he joined Stanford University for his doctoral studies and secured a PhD, mentored by S. M. Berman, for his thesis in Kaon physics, in 1968. During this period, Roy worked at Stanford Linear Accelerator Center as a research assistant (1966–1968) and as a temporary research associate (1968). He remained in the US for three more years for his post-doctoral work at Cornell University where he worked at the laboratories of Kenneth G. Wilson, who would go on to receive the Nobel Prize in Physics in 1982, and Toichiro Kinoshita, an APS fellow, simultaneously serving the university as an instructor. Before returning to India in 1972, he had a one-year spell at CERN during 1971–72 as a visiting scientist.

Roy's career at Tata Institute of Fundamental Research started in 1972 as a visiting fellow and he became a regular research fellow a year later. He served the institution for three decades and half and before his superannuation from TIFR service as a senior professor in 2017, he held various positions as reader (1976–83), associate professor (1983–90) and professor (1990–93). After retiring from regular service, Roy continued his research at Saha Institute of Nuclear Physics as a DAE Raja Ramanna fellow of the Board of Research in Nuclear Sciences (BRNS) until 2012 and carries on his research at the Center for Astroparticle Physics and Space Science (CAPSS) of Bose Institute as a senior scientist of the Indian National Science Academy ever since. In between, he had several spells abroad as a visiting faculty and the institutions he has served include Oxford University, University of Texas at Austin, University of California, Riverside, University of Hawaii at Manoa, University of Helsinki and Kavli Institute for Theoretical Physics.

Roy was married to Manashi Bhattacharya and the couple has two children, Jagori and Analabha. The family lives in Salt Lake, a satellite city of Kolkata, West Bengal..

On May 30, 2026, Roy was pronounced deceased at Manipal Hospital in Kolkata. He was 83 years old.

== Legacy ==
Photon-photon scattering (a Feynman diagram)

Roy's work in Kaon physics during his doctoral studies at Stanford University was based on the applications of algebra in the discipline and his thesis was subsequently published by the university under the title, Current-algebra Applications in Kaon Physics. Later, he worked on scale invariance and deep inelastic scattering while at CERN, Geneva and his research thereafter has covered several aspects of high energy physics. Roy has developed a new sum rule in two-photon processes which is related to the collision of two real polarised photons and the equation is now known as Roy's Sum Rule. Further, he proposed a solution for U(n)-symmetric Thirring model which has been detailed in two of his articles (Note: co-written with Gautam Bhattacharyya) published in 1975. Later, shifting his focus to supersymmetry and supergravity, he suggested new τ -number violating signals for R-parity breaking and estimated an upper bound on the gaugino-gravitino mass ratio. Deep inelastic lepton-hadron-photon processes with regard to their phenomenological aspects have been another area of his studies. Roy has also done extensive studies on neutrinos and Higgs mesons which covered the detection of heavy neutrinos, ultralight neutrinos in super-symmetry, oscillations and flavours, and his studies on neutrino detection helped India-based Neutrino Observatory in blueprinting the proposed detector at the observatory.

Roy's studies have been documented by way of a number of articles (Note: Please see Selected bibliography section) and the online article repository of the Indian Academy of Sciences has listed 106 of them. Besides, he has published four more books other than his PhD thesis viz. Theory of Lepton-Hadron Processes at High Energies: Partons, Scale Invariance and Light-Cone Physics, Supersymmetry and Supergravity Nonperturbative QCD Phenomenology of the standard model and beyond, and Theory and Phenomenology of Sparticles: An Account of Four-Dimensional N=1 Supersymmetry in High Energy Physics. Roy has also contributed chapters to books published by others and has mentored doctoral and post-doctoral scholars. The lecture series or invited talks delivered by him included Linear collider signals of anomaly-mediated supersymmetry breaking, at the physics working group meeting of American Linear Collider Physics in 2004, The wonderful world of neutrinos at S.N. Bose National Centre for Basic Sciences in 2004, Measuring the deviation from maximal mixing of atmospheric neutrinos at INO, at PANIC 05 in Santa Fe, New Mexico, Event-shape of dileptons plus missing energy at a linear collider as a SUSY/ADD discriminant at Indian Institute of Science in 2006, Symmetries of nonhierarchical neutrinos from high to low scales at IWTHEP-2007, and Dark Energy of the Universe at Indian Institute of Science Education and Research, Pune in 2015.

Roy is one among the Indian participants in the Oxford-India Network in Theoretical Physical Sciences, an initiative promoted by the John Fell Fund. He was a member of the research committee of the Council of Scientific and Industrial Research during 1991–94. Roy served as the chairman of the Physics Graduate School from 1992 to 1997 and the Department of Theoretical Physics from 1997 to 2002, both based at Tata Institute of Fundamental Research. He sat in the governing council of S.N. Bose National Centre for Basic Sciences from 1997 to 2002 and in the editorial boards of Indian Journal of Pure and Applied Physics, Pramana and Indian Journal of Physics during various terms. He also served as the vice-president of the Indian Physical Society in 1996 and presided the society in 2002.

== Awards and honours ==
During his college days at King's College, Cambridge, Roy received three honours from the institution; Powel Prize for the best student in natural sciences (1964), senior scholarship (1964) and honorary scholarship (1965). The Council of Scientific and Industrial Research awarded him the Shanti Swarup Bhatnagar Prize, one of the highest Indian science awards in 1987. The Indian Academy of Sciences elected him as a fellow in 1989 and he became a fellow of the Indian National Science Academy in 1992. Two years later, INSA selected him for the exchange fellowship between the academy of the Royal Society and the American Physical Society elected him as a fellow in 1995. He delivered the Meghnad Saha award oration of the Indian Association for the Cultivation of Science in 1997 and received the elected fellowship of the National Academy of Sciences, India in 2001.

== Selected bibliography ==
=== Books ===
- Probir Roy (1968). Current-algebra Applications in Kaon Physics. Department of Physics, Stanford University.
- Probir Roy (1975). Theory of Lepton-Hadron Processes at High Energies: Partons, Scale Invariance and Light-Cone Physics. Clarendon Press. ISBN 978-0-19-851452-7.
- Probir. Roy; Virendra. Singh (1984). Supersymmetry and Supergravity Nonperturbative QCD. Springer. ISBN 978-3-540-38942-2.
- Probir Roy; Tata Institute of Fundamental Research (1 January 1989). Phenomenology of the standard model and beyond: proceedings of the Workshop on High Energy Physics Phenomenology, 2–15 January 1989, TIFR, Bombay, India. World Scientific. ISBN 978-9971-5-0909-5.
- Manuel Drees; Rohini Godbole; Probir Roy (18 January 2005). Theory and Phenomenology of Sparticles: An Account of Four-Dimensional N=1 Supersymmetry in High Energy Physics. World Scientific. ISBN 978-981-4495-34-9.

=== Chapters ===
- Hans Volker Klapdor-Kleingrothaus; I. V. Krivosheina; R. Viollier (2011). Physics Beyond the Standard Models of Particles, Cosmology and Astrophysics: Proceedings of the Fifth International Conference, Beyond 2010 : Cape Town, South Africa, 1–6 February 2010. World Scientific. pp. 293–. ISBN 978-981-4340-85-4.
- Christopher G. Tully (10 October 2011). Elementary Particle Physics in a Nutshell. Princeton University Press. pp. 123–. ISBN 978-1-4008-3935-3.

=== Articles ===
- Gautam Bhattacharya, Probir Roy (1975). "Spinor-inverted solution to Thirring Model and its generaltion to U(n) symmetry". Annals of Physics. 91 (2): 325–355. Bibcode:1975AnPhy..91..325B. doi:10.1016/0003-4916(75)90224-9.
- Gautam Bhattacharya and Probir Roy (1975). "Exactly solvable two-dimensional U ( n ) gauge-field theory and its consequences". Phys. Rev. D. 12 (1721): 1721–1728. Bibcode:1975PhRvD..12.1721B. doi:10.1103/PhysRevD.12.1721.
- Ernest Ma, Probir Roy (1990). "Identifying τ as a nonleptonic superparticle". Physical Review D. 41 (3–1): 988–991. Bibcode:1990PhRvD..41..988M. doi:10.1103/PhysRevD.41.988. PMID 10012426.
- Probir Roy (1993). "Radiative electroweak parameters". Pramana - Journal of Physics. 41 (Suppl): 75–82. arXiv:hep-ph/9303325. Bibcode:1993Prama..41S..75R. doi:10.1007/BF02908077. S2CID 18365464.
- Partha Konar, Probir Roy (2006). "Event shape discrimination of supersymmetry from large extra dimensions at a linear collider". Physics Letters B. 634 (2–3): 295–301. arXiv:hep-ph/0509161. Bibcode:2006PhLB..634..295K. doi:10.1016/j.physletb.2006.01.056. S2CID 13912698.
