= Sampa Das =

Indian biotechnologist

Sampa Das is an Indian biotechnologist, scientist, and an expert on public sector agricultural biotechnology. She is a fellow of the Indian National Science Academy (FNA) and the National Academy of Sciences, India (FNASc). Currently, she is Senior Professor and Head of the Division of Plant Biology at Bose Institute in Kolkata, which is a multi-disciplinary research institution focused on science and technology.

== Education ==
Working under the supervision of Prof S K Sen of Bose Institute, Sampa Das received her doctorate degree in 1981. Das has worked with national and international individuals studying the mechanisms of plant defence responses against pests and pathogens, with an aim to combat their stress. She did her post-doctoral training at the Friedrich Miescher Institute in Switzerland, where she became interested in plant transformation, including rice, mustard, and tomatoes.

== Career ==
Dr. Das became a faculty member of Bose Institute.

She expanded her research of plant transformation to include chickpeas and mung bean, two important sources of protein for India's predominantly vegetarian population. Dr. Das began seeking ways to tweak the genetic constitution of these plants to improve their quality and quantity of the produce. After successfully completing her research on primary levels, she expanded her research to T3 and T4 level plants.

Her research at Bose has included isolation, characterization and monitoring the functionality of insecticidal proteins from plant sources. She has studied expression of agronomically important genes in crop plants.

She has worked on development of insect resistant transgenic rice, chickpea and mustard plants free of antibiotic resistant selection marker through the expression of mannose binding monocot plant lectins and different Bt toxin genes. She has studied the molecular interaction between receptor proteins identified from target insects and insecticidal lectins as well as different Bt proteins.

Dr. Das has worked on developing understanding of the mechanism of defense response in plants when challenged by various fungal and bacterial pathogens. Isolation and characterization of differentially expressed defense response related genes, proteins from rice and chickpea plants detected at early stage of infection by Fusarium oxysporum f.sp.ciceris and Xanthomonas oryzae pv oryzae, respectively.

She has worked on identification, characterisation and purification of few insecticidal lectins and other proteins from plant sources and isolation and cloning of effective insecticidal lectin and other protein coding gene(s) from respective plant genome(s).

Dr. Das has worked on establishment of efficient plant regeneration and transformation protocol for mustard, chickpea and pigeonpea. Other areas of interest are construction of a number of vectors with different T-DNA border elements for a better understanding of mechanism of T-DNA integration into host plant and construction of chimeric Bt, protease inhibitor gene (s) and other agronomically important gene(s) constructs for their expression in important crops namely, rice and mustard for increased productivity.

== Awards and honors ==
In 2007, she became a fellow of the Indian National Science Academy and two years later she became a fellow of the National Academy of Sciences India.
