= Roberta F. Colman =

American biochemist (1938–2019)

- Roberta F. Colman, from a 1964 newspaper.
- Born: Roberta Fishman; 1938; New York, USA
- Died: August 15, 2019 (aged 80–81); Media, Pennsylvania, USA
- Occupations: Biochemist, college professor
- Employer(s): Washington University in St. Louis; University of Delaware

Roberta F. Colman (1938 – August 15, 2019), born Roberta Fishman, was an American biochemist.

== Early life ==
Roberta Fishman was from New York City, the daughter of William and Esther Fishman of Brooklyn. As a student at Forest Hills High School in 1955, she received a Westinghouse Science Talent Search Award, and met president Dwight D. Eisenhower. Colman earned her bachelor's degree at Radcliffe College in 1959, and completed doctoral studies at Harvard University in 1962, with Frank Westheimer as her advisor. She held post-doctoral fellowships at the National Institutes of Health and the Washington University School of Medicine.

== Career ==
In 1966, she joined the faculty at the Washington University School of Medicine, where she had carried out postdoctoral research. From 1967 to 1973, Colman was a professor at Harvard Medical School, beginning as an assistant professor and later being promoted to associate professor. She joined the faculty at the University of Delaware in 1973, the first female biochemist to hold a faculty position there. She was the Willis F. Harrington Professor of Chemistry and Biochemistry, and director of the Chemistry-Biology Interface Graduate Program. She was elected a fellow of the American Association for the Advancement of Science (AAAS) in 1988. In 1988, Colman represented the Federation of American Societies for Experimental Biology (FASEB), when testified at a Senate budget hearing in support of increased funding for the National Science Foundation.

Colman's research involved "the effects of chemical modifications on enzymes". She held research grants from the National Science Foundation, the American Cancer Society and the National Institutes of Health, and wrote or co-wrote over 260 published scholarly articles. She served on the editorial boards of the Journal of Biological Chemistry, Protein Expression and Purification, and Protein Science, and was editor-in-chief of Archives of Biochemistry and Biophysics from 1984 to 2001. She retired from the University of Delaware in 2009.

Among her biochemistry graduate students at Delaware was Siddhartha Roy.

== Personal life ==
During college, Roberta Fishman married Robert W. Colman, a medical student, who had also won a Westinghouse Science Talent Search Award in the 1950s. They had two children. Robert Colman became a professor of medicine at Temple University. Roberta F. Colman died in 2019, in Media, Pennsylvania, aged 81 years.
