= Bhabatarak Bhattacharyya =

Indian biologist (born 1944)

- Born: 2 December 1944 (age 81); Kolkata, West Bengal, India
- Education: Rajabazar Science College; Calcutta University; Indian Institute of Science; National Institutes of Health
- Known for: Fluorescence of colchicine
- Awards: 1988 Shanti Swarup Bhatnagar Prize; P. S. Sharma Memorial Award; Bose Institute Foundation Day Award
- Scientific career
- Fields: Structural biology; Biochemistry
- Workplaces: Indian Association for the Cultivation of Science; Bose Institute
- Doctoral advisor: Uma Shankar Nandi

Bhabatarak Bhattacharyya (born 2 December 1944), popularly known as Bablu Bhattacharyya, is an Indian structural biologist, biochemist and academic, known for his studies on the colchicine-tubulin interaction. He is a former professor and the head of the department of biochemistry at the Bose Institute, Kolkata and an elected fellow of the Indian Academy of Sciences, Indian National Science Academy, National Academy of Sciences, India and The World Academy of Sciences. The Council of Scientific and Industrial Research, the apex agency of the Government of India for scientific research, awarded him the Shanti Swarup Bhatnagar Prize for Science and Technology, one of the highest Indian science awards, in 1988, for his contributions to biological sciences.

== Biography ==
Born on 2 December 1944 in Kolkata, in the Indian state of West Bengal to Bhabaranjan-Malancha couple, Bhattacharyya graduated in chemistry from the University of Calcutta and secured his master's degree in physical chemistry from Rajabazar Science College campus of the same university. Subsequently, he joined the Indian Association for the Cultivation of Science, Kolkata and pursued his doctoral studies to secure the degree under the guidance of Uma Shankar Nandi of the Indian Institute of Science. Moving to the US, he completed his post-doctoral studies at the laboratory of Jan Wolff of the National Institutes of Health. He returned to India in 1976 to join Bose Institute as a CSIR pool officer where he shifted to academics as a lecturer in 1978 and continued his service until his superannuation as a professor and head of the department of biochemistry. He has also been associated with Presidency College, Calcutta as a professor at their Department of Chemistry and Biochemistry.

Bhattacharyya's early work during his post-doctoral studies at Jan Wolff's laboratory were on tubulin and its binding mechanism with antimitotic drugs. Later, he focused his researches on colchicine-tubulin interaction and elucidated the effect of the carbonyl group on the side chain of B-ring in the irreversible binding of colchicine. He demonstrated the fluorescence of colchicine-tubilin bind which is reported to have offered an alternative to radio-labeled colchicine in pharmacological assays and made the study of the kinetics of colchicine binding easier. He studied the mechanism of chaperone-like activity of tubulin and microtubule associated proteins and his studies have known to be of significance in the design of lead compounds as well as new drugs for the treatment of cancer. He has published several articles detailing his research findings, has registered patents for his work and has mentored many scholars in their doctoral studies. His scientific career has been documented in an article, Dr. Bablu Bhattacharyya: A Journey of Four Decades with Tubulin, published in 2015. He has also been associated with the Council of Scientific and Industrial Research, Department of Science and Technology, Indian National Science Academy and the Indian Academy of Sciences as a member of their various technical committees.

== Awards and honors ==
The Council of Scientific and Industrial Research awarded him the Shanti Swarup Bhatnagar Prize, one of the highest Indian science awards in 1988. He is an elected fellow of several science academies including the Indian Academy of Sciences, Indian National Science Academy, the National Academy of Sciences, India and The World Academy of Sciences. He is also a recipient of the P. S. Sharma Memorial Award of the Society for Biological Chemists, India and the Foundation Day Award of Bose Institute.

== See also ==
- Colchicine
- Tubulin
