= Gopal Chandra Bhattacharya =

Indian entomologist (1895–1981)

Rabindra Puraskar Awardee Gopal Chandra Bhattacharya
- Born: 1 August 1895; Lonesing, Naria, Faridpur District, Bengal, British India
- Died: 8 April 1981 (aged 85); Kolkata, West Bengal, India
- Awards: Rabindra Puraskar, 1975; Ananda Puraskar, 1968
- Scientific career
- Fields: Entomologist, Botanist
- Workplaces: Bose Institute, Kolkata

Gopal Chandra Bhattacharya (1 August 1895 – 8 April 1981) was an Indian entomologist and naturalist who spent most of his career at Bose Institute, Kolkata. He had no formal college degree. In 1981, the University of Calcutta awarded him an honorary Doctor of Science degree months before he died. He was awarded the Ananda Puraskar for Bengali literature in 1968, and the highest award for Bengali literature, the Rabindra Puraskar, in 1975.

He published his first research papers in 1932, on life events in the body of plants. Subsequently, he also published work on bioluminescence and other botany topics, but gradually his interests shifted to entomology. He became an expert photographer, and photographed many varieties of ants, spiders, small bats and tadpoles. In total, he published 22 papers in English, including in journals such as the Natural History of the American Museum of Natural History.

== Science popularization ==
In 1948 he worked with Satyendra Nath Bose (of Bose–Einstein statistics fame) to establish the Bangiya Bijnan Parishad (Bengal Science Council), a society for science research.

== Scientific findings ==
In 1943, possibly before the fact had been established among naturalists, Gopal Chandra published an article in the Transactions of the Bose Institute of Calcutta, outlining how the queen in social insects such as ants or bees, produces other queens, workers or soldiers, by appropriately altering the nature of the royal jelly fed to the larvae. His observations were based on a species of ants, Oecophylla smaragdina.

== The Gopal Chandra Bhattacharya Award ==
In 2005, the government of West Bengal instituted an award for science popularization in his name, the Gopal Chandra Bhattacharyya Smriti Puraskar. In 2005, the entomologist Debashis Biswas was awarded this prize for writing several books that describe the biology of mosquitoes and malaria prevention through stories.
