= Siddhartha Roy =

Indian scientist (born 1954)

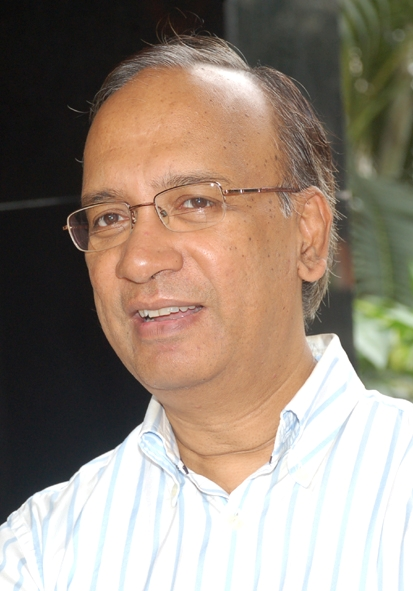
- Born: 1 April 1954 (age 72); West Bengal, India
- Education: Presidency College (University of Calcutta); University of Delaware; Brandeis University
- Known for: Studies on gene expression using the operator-repressor system of bacteriophage lambda macromolecular interactions leading to high fidelity of protein synthesis
- Awards: 1999 Shanti Swarup Bhatnagar Prize; USDHHS Meritorious Service Award
- Scientific career
- Fields: Structural biology
- Workplaces: National Institutes of Health; Bose Institute; Indian Institute of Chemical Biology
- Doctoral advisor: Roberta Colman

Siddhartha Roy (born 1 April 1954) is an Indian Chemical and Structural biologist, biophysicist, former director of the Indian Institute of Chemical Biology and the former director (officiating) of Bose Institute. Widely known for his studies on Gene Regulation, Peptidomimetics, bacteriophage lambda and protein synthesis, he is an elected fellow of the Indian Academy of Sciences and the Indian National Science Academy. In 1999, the Council of Scientific and Industrial Research, the apex agency of the Government of India for scientific research, awarded him the Shanti Swarup Bhatnagar Prize for Science and Technology, for his contributions to Biological sciences.

== Early life, education and career ==
Roy was born in the Indian state of West Bengal.

He completed his schooling at Ballygunge Government High School, then obtained a first class honours degree in chemistry (BSc Hons) from Presidency College, Calcutta in 1974 and did his doctoral studies at the University of Delaware under the guidance of Prof. Roberta F. Colman to secure a PhD in 1981. His post-doctoral studies were at Brandeis University at the laboratory of Prof. Alfred Redfield (1981–82) and at the National Institutes of Health (1982–86).

Returning to India in 1986, he joined Bose Institute, Kolkata as a senior lecturer in the department of biophysics. He served the Institute till 2004 holding positions of Reader and then Professor of Biophysics when he moved to the Indian Institute of Chemical Biology (IICB) as its director. After completing 10 years as the director of IICB, he returned to Bose Institute in 2014 as a senior professor and dean of studies. While at IICB, he has served the nation in several different high-level capacities such as the founder-director-in-charge of the National Institute of Pharmaceutical Education and Research, Kolkata (NIPER) (2007–14), the cluster director of 11 Biological institutes of the Council of Scientific and Industrial Research (CSIR) (2009–14), member of the governing body of the CSIR and as a visiting professor at Osaka University (2012). He has served as the president of the West Bengal Academy of Science and Technology. He is the founder-president of the Chemical Biology Society of India. He currently serves as a member of the board of directors of the International Chemical Biology Society. He also served as the director (officiating) of Bose Institute during the critical Centenary year. In addition, Roy played the very crucial role as an advisory committee member to successfully conduct the 'International Conference on Genome Biology 2019' hosted by the School of Biological Sciences (SBS), Madurai Kamaraj University.

== Research ==
Roy's researches during his stint in the US was on protein folding and nuclear magnetic resonance studies of DNA and those researches identified the first hydropathy model which helped in predicting the exteriors and interiors of proteins by analyzing sequence information. He is also reported to have performed the complete assignment of a nucleic acid imino proton spectra using Nuclear Overhauser effect, regio-specific isotope labeling of sugars in nucleic acids and working along with Ad Bax and R. H. Griffey, developed an indirect 2D-NMR detection method, all reported to be for the first time. Later focusing his attention on bacteriophage lambda, he studied the gene expression of the bacterial virus using its operator-repressor system. Through his collaborative work with Sankar Adhya in 1998, he elucidated the role of differential contact in the transcription regulation mechanism and demonstrated the theory in many genetic regulatory circuits. His current work is focused on peptide therapeutics and he holds patents for some of his work.

He is the Co-author of "Chemical Biology of the Genome" published by Elsevier/AP. He is a joint editor of Subcellular Biochemistry, volume on Proteins: Structure, Function, and Engineering published by Plenum Press, New York, USA and Protein-Protein interaction Regulators published by Royal Society of Chemistry, UK. He has guided around 30 scholars in their doctoral studies. When the Chemical Biology Society of India was formed in 2013, he became its founder president and holds the position. He is a former president of the West Bengal Academy of Science and Technology and is its incumbent vice president.

== Awards and honours ==
The Indian Academy of Sciences elected Roy as their fellow in 1996 and the Council of Scientific and Industrial Research awarded him the Shanti Swarup Bhatnagar Prize, one of the highest Indian science awards, in 1999. A recipient of the Meritorious Service Award of the United States Department of Health and Human Services, he was elected by the Indian National Science Academy as a fellow in 2005. In 2007, he was elected as a fellow of the West Bengal Academy of Science and Technology and he received the J. C. Bose National Fellowship of the Science and Engineering Research Board as well as the Tata Innovation Fellowship of the Department of Biotechnology the same year. He was also a member of Guha Research Conference during the years 1992 and 2012. He is a Fellow of the Royal Society of Chemistry, UK and has been elected a member of The World Academy of Sciences (FTWAS).

== Books ==
1. Gene Expression and its Regulation—An Evolutionary Perspective by Siddhartha Roy. 2025. Published by Springer-Nature.
2. Chemical Biology of the Genome by Siddhartha Roy & Tapas Kundu. 2021. Published by Elsevier/AP.
3. Protein-Protein interaction Regulators, edited by Siddhartha Roy & Haian Fu. 2021. Published by Royal Society of Chemistry, UK
4. Subcellular Biochemistry, Volume 24 on Proteins: Structure, Function, and Engineering, edited by B. B. Biswas & Siddhartha Roy. 1995. Published by Plenum Press, New York, USA.

== Selected bibliography ==
- Gitashri Naiya, Paromita Raha, Manas Mondal, Uttam Pal, Rajesh Saha, Susobhan Choudhury, Subrata Batabyal, Samir Kumar Pal, Dhananjay Bhattacharyya, Nakul Chandra Maiti, Siddhartha Roy (June 2016). "Conformational Selection Underpins Recognition of Multiple DNA sequences by Proteins and Consequent Functional Actions". Physical Chemistry Chemical Physics. 18 (31): 21618–21628. Bibcode:2016PCCP...1821618N. doi:10.1039/C6CP03278H. PMID 27426617.
- Samir Kumar Pal, Susobhan Choudhury, Basusree Ghosh, Priya Singh, Raka Ghosh, Siddhartha Roy (June 2016). "Ultrafast Differential Flexibility of Cro-protein Binding Domains of Two Operator DNAs with Different Sequences". Physical Chemistry Chemical Physics. 18 (27): 17983–17990. Bibcode:2016PCCP...1817983C. doi:10.1039/C6CP02522F. PMID 27326896.
- Sk Kayum Alam, Vinod Yadav, Swati Bajaj, Arindam Datta, Shamit Kumar Dutta, Madhumita Bhattacharyya, Santanu Bhattacharya, Subrata Debnath, Siddhartha Roy, Lisa A Boardman, Thomas Smyrk, Julian R. Molina, Saikat Chakrabarty, Shantanu Chowdhury, Debabrata Mukhopadhyay, Susanta Roychoudhury (April 2016). "DNA Damage-Induced Ephrin-B2 Reverse Signaling Promotes Chemoresistance and Drives EMT in Colorectal Carcinoma Harboring Mutant p53". Cell Death and Differentiation. 23 (4): 707–722. doi:10.1038/cdd.2015.133. PMC 4986638. PMID 26494468.
- Gitashri Naiya, Stephanie Kaypee, Tapas Kundu, Siddhartha Roy (March 2015). "A Constrained Helical Peptide Against S100A4 Inhibits Cell Motility in Tumor Cells". Chemical Biology & Drug Design. 86 (4): 945–950. doi:10.1111/cbdd.12553. PMID 25763457. S2CID 30631236.
- Tanjore Balganesh, Tapas Kundu, Tushar Kanti Chakraborty, Siddhartha Roy (July 2014). "Drug Discovery Research in India: Current State and Future Prospects". ACS Medicinal Chemistry Letters. 5 (7): 724–6. doi:10.1021/ml500183c. PMC 4094254. PMID 25050153.
- Siddhartha Roy, Tapas Kundu (February 2014). "Gene regulatory networks and epigenetic modifications in cell differentiation". IUBMB Life. 66 (2): 100–109. doi:10.1002/iub.1249. PMID 24574067. S2CID 205968012.
- Siddhartha Roy, Piya Ghosh, Neeladri Roy, Abhishek Mazumder, Koushik Roy, Asit Kumar Manna, Shampa Mallick, Israr Ahmed (May 2012). "Peptide based Molecules as Protein-Protein Interaction Inhibitors: Tools for Chemical Genetics and Therapy". Current Chemical Biology. 6 (2): 145–163. doi:10.2174/2212796811206020145.
- DNA-Bound p53-DNA-Binding Domain Interconverts between Multiple Conformations: Implications for Partner Protein Recognition. Bhattacharjee, S., Mukherjee, S., and Roy, S.* (2021) J Phys Chem B, 125, 5832-5837.https://doi.org/10.1021/acs.jpcb.1c03794
- A peptide-based synthetic transcription factor selectively activates transcription in a mammalian cell. Roy, K., Mazumder, A., Ghosh, P., Naiya, G., Ghosh, B., & Roy, S.* (2018) Chem Commun. 54, 1611-1614.https://doi.org/10.1039/C7CC09279B
- A Peptide-based Synthetic Transcription Factor Selectively Down-regulates the Proto-oncogene CFOS in Tumour Cells and Inhibits Proliferation. Chakraborty, M. and Roy, S.* (2016) Chem Commun, 53, 376-379.https://doi.org/10.1039/C6CC08086C
- Specific Sequence of a Beta-turn in Human La Protein May Contribute to Species Specificity of Hepatitis C Virus. Kumar, A., Manna, AK., Ray, U., Mullick, R., Basu, G., Das, S., & Roy, S.* (2014) J Virol, 88, 4319-27. https://doi.org/10.1128/jvi.00049-14
- A Synthetic Peptide Mimic of l-Cro shows Sequence-Specific Binding in vitro and in vivo. Mazumder, A., Maiti, A., Roy, K., & Roy, S.* (2012) ACS Chem Biol, 7, 1084-94. https://doi.org/10.1021/cb200523n
- Peptide-protein interactions suggest that acetylation of lysines 381 and 382 of p53 is important for positive coactivator 4/p53 interaction. Debnath, S., Chatterjee, S., Arif, M., Kundu, TK., & Roy, S.* (2011) J Biol Chem, 286, 25076-87.https://doi.org/10.1074/jbc.M110.205328
- Differential recognition of phosphorylated transactivation domains of p53 by different p300 domains. Polley, S., Guha, S., Roy, NS., Kar, S., Sakaguch,i K., Chuman, Y., Swaminathan, V., Kundu, T., & Roy, S.* (2008) J Mol Biol, 376, 8-12. https://doi.org/10.1016/j.jmb.2007.11.082
- Switching DNA-binding specificity by unnatural amino acid substitution. Maiti, A., & Roy, S.* (2005) Nucleic Acids Res, 33, 5896-903. https://doi.org/10.1093/nar/gki899
- Asynchronous basepair openings in transcription initiation: regulation by enhancing the rate limiting step. Roy, S., Lim, HM., & Adhya, S. (2004) EMBO J, 23, 869-75. https://doi.org/10.1038/sj.emboj.7600098
- Fluorescence quenching methods to study protein-nucleic acid interaction. Roy, S.* (2004) Methods Enzymol, 379, 175-87. https://doi.org/10.1016/S0076-6879(04)79010-2
- 2-Aminopurine as a probe for Basepair opening during Transcription Initiation. Roy, S.* (2003) Methods Enzymol, 370, 568-76. https://doi.org/10.1016/S0076-6879(03)70048-2
- Glutamate counteracts the denaturing effect of urea through its effect on the denatured state. Mandal, AK., Samaddar, S., Banerjee, R., Lahiri, S., Bhattacharyya, A., & Roy, S.* (2003) J Biol Chem, 278, 36077-84. https://doi.org/10.1074/jbc.M211207200
- Solvation Change and Ion release During Aminoacylation by Aminoacyl-tRNA synthetases. Bannerjee, R., Mandal, AK., Shah, R., Guha, S., Samaddar, S., Bhattacharyya, A., & Roy, S.* (2003) Nucleic Acids Res, 31, 6035-42. https://doi.org/10.1093/nar/gkg779
- Aib-based peptide backbone as scaffolds for helical peptide mimics. Banerjee, R., Basu, G.,* Roy, S.,* & Chene, P. (2002) J Pept Res, 60, 88-94.https://doi.org/10.1034/j.1399-3011.2002.201005.x
- DnaK-sigma32 interaction is temperature dependent: Implication for the mechanism of heat-shock response. Chattopadhyay, R., & Roy, S.* (2002) J Biol Chem, 277, 33641-7. https://doi.org/10.1074/jbc.M203197200
- Effect of phosphorylation on the structure and fold of transactivation domain of p53. Kar S., Sakaguchi, K., Shimohigashi, Y., Samaddar, S., Banerjee, R., Basu, G., Swaminathan, V., Kundu, TK., & Roy, S.* (2002) J Biol Chem, 277, 15579-85. https://doi.org/10.1074/jbc.M106915200
- Effect of osmolytes and chaperone-like action of P-protein on folding of nucleocapsid protein of Chandipura virus. Majumder A, Basak S, Raha T, Chowdhury SP, Chattopadhyay D, Roy S.* (2001) J Biol Chem. 276, 30948-55.https://doi.org/10.1074/jbc.M011705200
- A "master" in base unpairing during isomerization of a promoter upon RNA polymerase binding. Lim, HM., Lee, HJ., Roy, S., & Adhya, S. (2001) Proc Natl Acad Sci (U S A), 98, 14849-52. https://doi.org/10.1073/pnas.261517398
- Damage-mediated phosphorylation of human p53 threonine 18 through a cascade mediated by a casein 1-like kinase. Effect on Mdm2 binding. Sakaguchi, K., Saito, S., Higashimoto, Y., Roy, S., Anderson, CW., & Appella, E. (2000) J Biol Chem, 275, 9278-83. https://doi.org/10.1074/jbc.275.13.9278
- Interaction of Gal repressor with inducer and operator: induction of gal transcription from repressor-bound DNA. Chatterjee, S., Zhou, YN., Roy, S., & Adhya, S. (1997) Proc Natl Acad Sci (USA), 94 2957-2962. https://doi.org/10.1073/pnas.94.7.2957
- A fluorescence anisotropy study of tetramer-dimer equilibrium of l-repressor and its implications for function. Banik, U., Mandal, N.C., Bhattacharyya, B., & Roy, S.* (1993) J Biol Chem, 268, 3938-3943. https://doi.org/10.1016/S0021-9258(18)53562-6
- An operator induced conformational change of C-terminal domain of l-repressor. Saha, R., Banik, U., Mandal, N.C., Bhattacharyya, B., & Roy, S.* (1992) J Biol Chem, 267, 5862-5867. https://doi.org/10.1016/S0021-9258(18)42633-6
- ^{15}N-guanosine-labeled oligonucleotide as probe for protein-nucleic acid interaction in the major groove. Massefski, W., Redfield, AG., Das Sarma, U., Bannerji, A., & Roy, S.* (1990) J Am Chem Soc, 112, 5350-5351. https://doi.org/10.1021/ja00169a052
- Solid state deuterium NMR study of thymidine. Base rigidity and ribose ring flexibility in deoxynucleosides. Hiyama, Y., Roy, S., Cohen, JS. & Torchia, DA. (1989) J Am Chem Soc, 111, 8609-8613. https://doi.org/10.1021/ja00205a008
- New enzymic synthesis of 2'-deoxynucleoside-2',2'-d2 and the determination of sugar ring flexibility by solid-state deuterium NMR. Roy, S.,* Hiyama, Y., Torchia, DA., & Cohen, JS. (1986) J Am Chem Soc, 108, 1675-1678. https://doi.org/10.1021/ja00267a043
- NMR study of slowly exchanging protons in yeast tRNA^{asp}. Figueroa, N., Keith, G., Leroy, J.L., Plateau, P., Roy, S., & Gueron, M. (1983) Proc Natl Acad Sci (USA), 80, 4330-4333. https://doi.org/10.1073/pnas.80.14.4330
- Nuclear Overhauser effect study of yeast tRNA^{valI}:Evidence of uridine-Pseudouridine base pairing. Schejter, E., Roy, S., Sanchez, V., & Redfield, AG. (1982) Nucleic Acids Res, 10, 8297-8305. https://doi.org/10.1093/nar/10.24.8297
- Procedure for C2 deuteration of nucleic acids and determination of AY 31 pseudouridine conformation by nuclear overhauser effect. Roy, S., Papastavros, M.Z., & Redfield, AG. (1982) Nucleic Acids Res, 10, 8341-8349. https://doi.org/10.1093/nar/10.24.8341
- Roy, S., & Redfield, AG. Nuclear Overhauser effect study and assignment of D stem and reverse hoogsteen base pair proton of yeast tRNA^{asp}. (1981) Nucleic Acids Res, 9, 7073-7083. https://doi.org/10.1093/nar/9.24.7073
- Hydrophobic basis of packing in globular proteins. Rose, GD. & Roy, S. (1980) Proc Natl Acad Sci (USA), 77, 4643-4647. https://doi.org/10.1073/pnas.77.8.4643

== Patents ==
The list is incomplete.

- Sibabrata Mukhopadhyay, Mumu Chakraborty, Arun Bandyopadhyay, Dipak Kar, Tanima Banerjee, Aditya Konar, Debaprasad Jana, Siddhartha Roy, Santu Bandyopadhyay, Balram Ghosh, Mabalirajan Ulaganathan, Rakesh Johri, Subhash Sharma, Gurdarshan Singh, Bholanath Paul, Vasanta Madhava Sharma Gangavaram, Jhillu Singh Yadav, Radha Krishna Palakodety (August 2013). "Method for treatment of bronchial asthma (Patent US8519154B2)".
- Sujoy K Das Gupta, Abhik Saha, Archana Sharma, Siddhartha Roy, Bhabatarak Bhattacharya (January 2012). "Peptide antagonists for inhibiting heat shock protein (Hsp 16.3) of Mycobacterium tuberculosis (Patent 7569537)".
- S. Bandyopadhay, B. Ghosh, Parasuraman Jaisankar, Bikas C Pal, Siddhartha Roy, Nath Paul, Arjun Ram, U. Mabalirajan, Nahid Ali, Arun Bandyopadhyay, Aditya Konar, J. B. Chakraborty, I. C. Mukherjee, Jaydeep Chaudhuri, Sanjit Kumar Mahato, A. Manna, Roma Sinha, Pradyot Bhattacharya, J. Vinayagam, Sudeshna Chowdhury (January 2012). "Substituted catechols as inhibitors of IL-4 and IL-5 for the treatment of bronchial asthma (WO Patent 2,012,140,574)". doi:10.13140/RG.2.1.2784.6488.
- 1st S. Bandyopadhay, B. Ghosh, Parasuraman Jaisankar, Bikas C Pal, Siddhartha Roy, Nath Paul, Arjun Ram, U. Mabalirajan, Nahid Ali, Arun Bandyopadhyay, Aditya Konar, J. B. Chakraborty, I. C. Mukherjee, Jaydeep Chaudhuri, Sanjit Kumar Mahato, A. Manna, Roma Sinha, Pradyot Bhattacharya, J. Vinayagam, D. P. Jana, Sudeshna Chowdhury (January 2012). "Substituted catechols as inhibitors of IL-4 and IL-5 for the treatment of bronchial asthma (WO Patent 2,012,140,574.)". doi:10.13140/RG.2.1.2784.6488.
- 1st Subhendu Bandyopadhyay, B. Ghosh, Parasuraman Jaisankar, Bikas C Pal, Siddhartha Roy, Nath Paul, Arjun Ram, U. Mabalirajan, Nahid Ali, Arun Bandyopadhyay, Aditya Konar, J. Bagchi Chakraborty, I. Choudhury Mukherjee, Jaydeep Chaudhuri, Sanjit Kumar Mahato, A. Manna, Roma Sinha, Pradyot Bhattacharya, J. Vinayagam, D. P. Jana, Sudeshna Chowdhury (April 2011). "Inhibitors of IL-4 and IL-5 for the treatment of bronchial asthma (Patent 1032DEL2011)".
