= Indrani Bose =

Indian physicist (born 1951)

- Born: 15 August 1951 (age 75); Kolkata, India
- Education: Rajabazar Science College (University of Calcutta)
- Awards: Stree Shakthi Science Samman award (2000)
- Scientific career
- Fields: Theoretical physics
- Workplaces: Bose Institute
- Doctoral advisor: Chanchal Kumar Majumdar

Indrani Bose (born 15 August 1951) is an Indian physicist, senior Professor at Department of Physics, Bose Institute, Kolkata. Her fields of specialization are in theoretical condensed matter, quantum information theory, statistical physics, biological physics and systems.

== Education ==
Bose obtained her Ph.D. (Physics) in 1981 from Rajabazar Science College, University of Calcutta.

== Career ==
Bose's research interests include the problem of quantum many body systems, quantum information theory, statistical mechanics and systems biology.

She is a fellow of the Indian Academy of Sciences, Bangalore and of the National Academy of Sciences, Allahabad. She also developed a strong solid-state theory group in the Bose Institute.

== Awards ==
Bose was the first recipient of the Stree Shakthi Science Samman award (2000) for her work on exact solutions of model Hamiltonian (low dimensions) in the context of magnetic systems.
