= Kaustuv Sanyal =

Indian molecular biologist, mycologist and professor

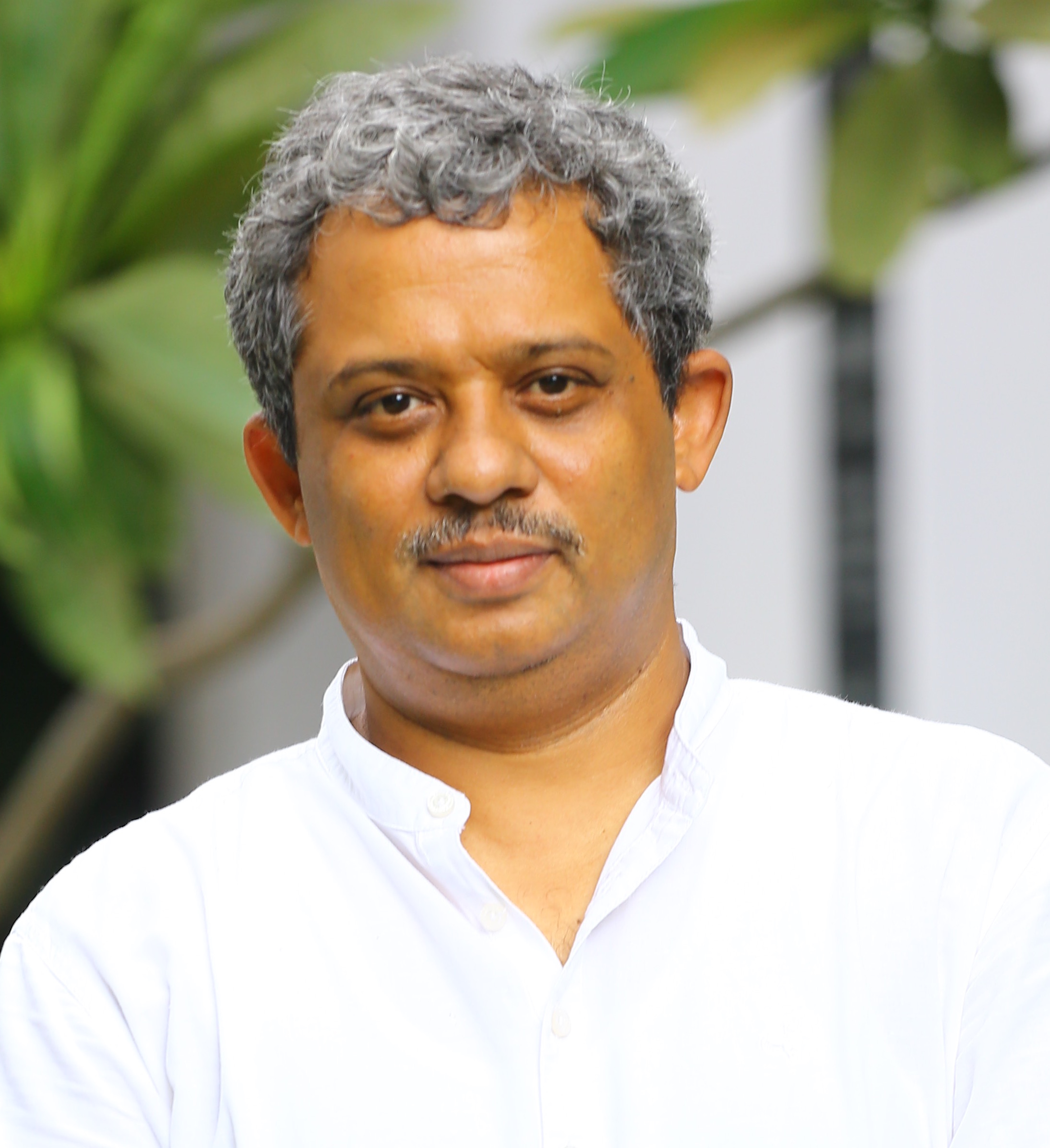
- Born: 1969 (age 56–57); Berhampore, West Bengal, India
- Education: Bidhan Chandra Krishi Viswavidyalaya; Madurai Kamaraj University; Bose Institute; University of California, Santa Barbara, USA
- Known for: Studies on pathogenic yeasts
- Awards: 2012 N-BIOS Prize; 2017 Tata Innovation Award by the Department of Biotechnology, Govt of India 2020 JC Bose National Fellowship by the Department of Science and Technology, Govt. of India 2022 Sun Pharma Science Foundation Research Award - Basic Science 2022 2022 GNR Gold Medal for Excellence in Biological Sciences and Technology by CSIR, Govt. of India
- Scientific career
- Fields: Molecular biology; Mycology
- Workplaces: Jawaharlal Nehru Centre for Advanced Scientific Research; Visiting Professor, Osaka University, Japan (2020 - 2023)
- Doctoral advisor: Prof. Pratima Sinha
- Other academic advisors: John Carbon
- Website: https://www.jncasr.ac.in/faculty/sanyal

Kaustuv Sanyal (born 1969) is an Indian molecular biologist, mycologist and Director of Bose Institute in Kolkata. He is a professor at the Molecular Biology and Genetics Unit of the Jawaharlal Nehru Centre for Advanced Scientific Research (JNCASR). He is known for his molecular and genetic studies of pathogenic yeasts such as Candida and Cryptococcus). An alumnus of Bidhan Chandra Krishi Viswavidyalaya and Madurai Kamaraj University from where he earned a BSc in agriculture and MSc in biotechnology respectively, Sanyal did his doctoral studies at Bose Institute to secure a PhD in Yeast genetics. He moved to the University of California, Santa Barbara, USA to work in the laboratory of John Carbon on the discovery of centromeres in Candida albicans. He joined JNCASR in 2005. He is a member of the Faculty of 1000 in the disciplines of Microbial Evolution and Genomics and has delivered invited speeches which include the Gordon Research Conference, EMBO conferences on comparative genomics and kinetochores. The Department of Biotechnology of the Government of India awarded him the National Bioscience Award for Career Development, one of the highest Indian science awards, for his contributions to biosciences, in 2012. He has also been awarded with the prestigious Tata Innovation Fellowship in 2017. The National Academy of Sciences, India elected him as a fellow in 2014. He is also an elected fellow of Indian Academy of Sciences (2017), and the Indian National Science Academy (2018). In 2019, he has been elected to Fellowship in the American Academy of Microbiology (AAM), the honorific leadership group within the American Society for Microbiology. He was awarded the J.C. Bose National Fellowship in 2020.

== Selected bibliography ==
- Sridhar, Shreyas; Dumbrepatil, Arti; Sreekumar, Lakshmi; Sankaranarayanan, Sundar Ram; Guin, Krishnendu; Sanyal, Kaustuv (2017). S.ndal, Subhrangsu (ed.). Centromere and Kinetochore: Essential Components for Chromosome Segregation. Wiley-VCH Verlag GmbH & Co. KGaA. pp. 259–288. doi:10.1002/9783527697274.ch9. ISBN 978-3-527-69727-4.
- Sreekumar, Lakshmi; Varshney, Neha; Sanyal, Kaustuv (2017). "Chromosome Components Important for Genome Stability in Candida albicans and Related Species". Candida albicans: Cellular and Molecular Biology. Springer, Cham. pp. 233–251. doi:10.1007/978-3-319-50409-4_12. ISBN 978-3-319-50408-7.

== See also ==
- Chromosome segregation
- Candida albicans
