= Satyendra Nath Bose =

Indian theoretical physicist (1894–1974)

Satyendra Nath Bose FRS, MP
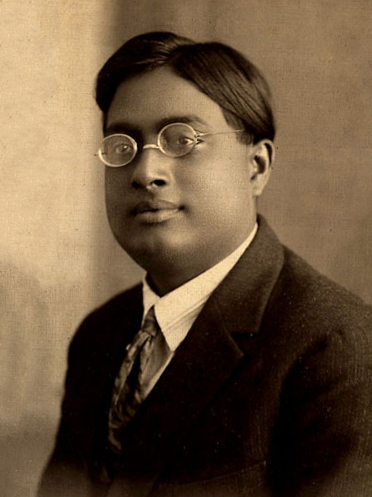
- Bose in 1925
- Born: Satyendra Nath Bose; 1 January 1894; Calcutta, Bengal Presidency, British India
- Died: 4 February 1974 (aged 80); Calcutta, West Bengal, India
- Education: Presidency College (BSc); Science College, Calcutta University (MSc)
- Known for: Bose–Einstein condensate; Bose–Einstein statistics; Bose–Einstein distribution; Bose–Einstein correlations; Boson
- Spouse: Ushabati Bose (née Ghosh)
- Awards: Padma Vibhushan; Fellow of the Royal Society
- Scientific career
- Fields: Theoretical physics, quantum mechanics, mathematics
- Workplaces: University of Calcutta; Visva-Bharati; University of Dhaka
- Academic advisors: Jagadish Chandra Bose; Prafulla Chandra Ray
- Doctoral students: Purnima Sinha; Partha Ghose; Siva Brata Bhattacherjee
- Other notable students: Mani Lal Bhaumik; Lilabati Bhattacharjee; Asima Chatterjee; Ratan Lal Brahmachary

Member of Parliament, Rajya Sabha
- In office 3 April 1952 – 2 April 1960
- Preceded by: office established
- Constituency: Nominated (Education)

Satyendra Nath Bose (/ˈboʊs/; (Note: The English pronunciation is from the Hindustani, [səˈtjeːndrə ˈnaːtʰ ˈboːs]. The Bengali pronunciation is [ʃotːendronatʰ boʃu].) 1 January 1894 – 4 February 1974) was an Indian theoretical physicist and mathematician. He is best known for his work on quantum mechanics in the early 1920s, in developing the foundation for Bose–Einstein statistics, and the theory of the Bose–Einstein condensate. A Fellow of the Royal Society, he was awarded India's second highest civilian award, the Padma Vibhushan, in 1954 by the Government of India.

The eponymous particles class described by Bose's statistics, bosons, were named by Paul Dirac.

A polymath, he had a wide range of interests in varied fields, including physics, mathematics, chemistry, biology, mineralogy, philosophy, arts, literature, and music. He served on many research and development committees in India after independence.

== Early life ==
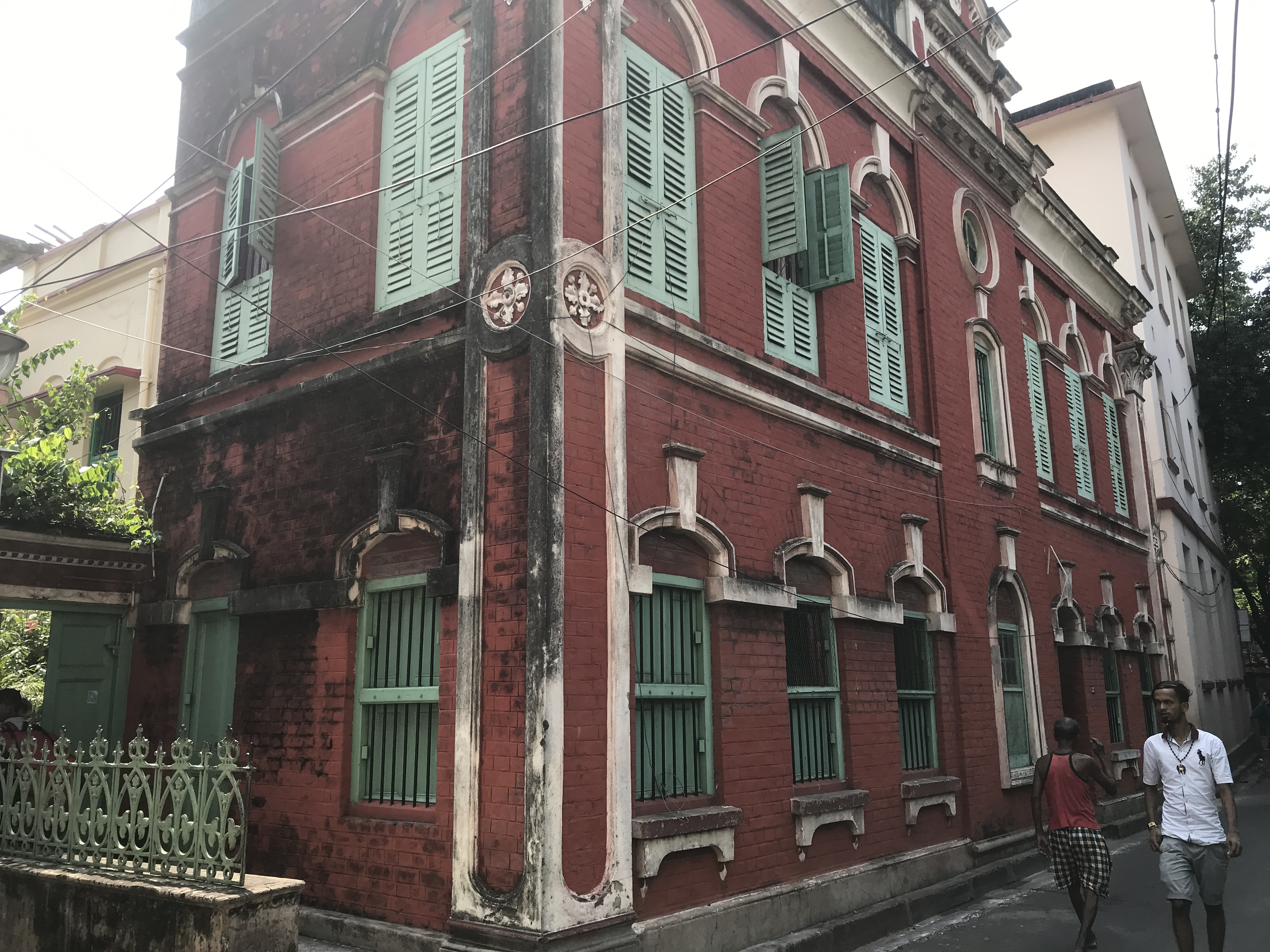
Satyendra Nath Bose Birthplace

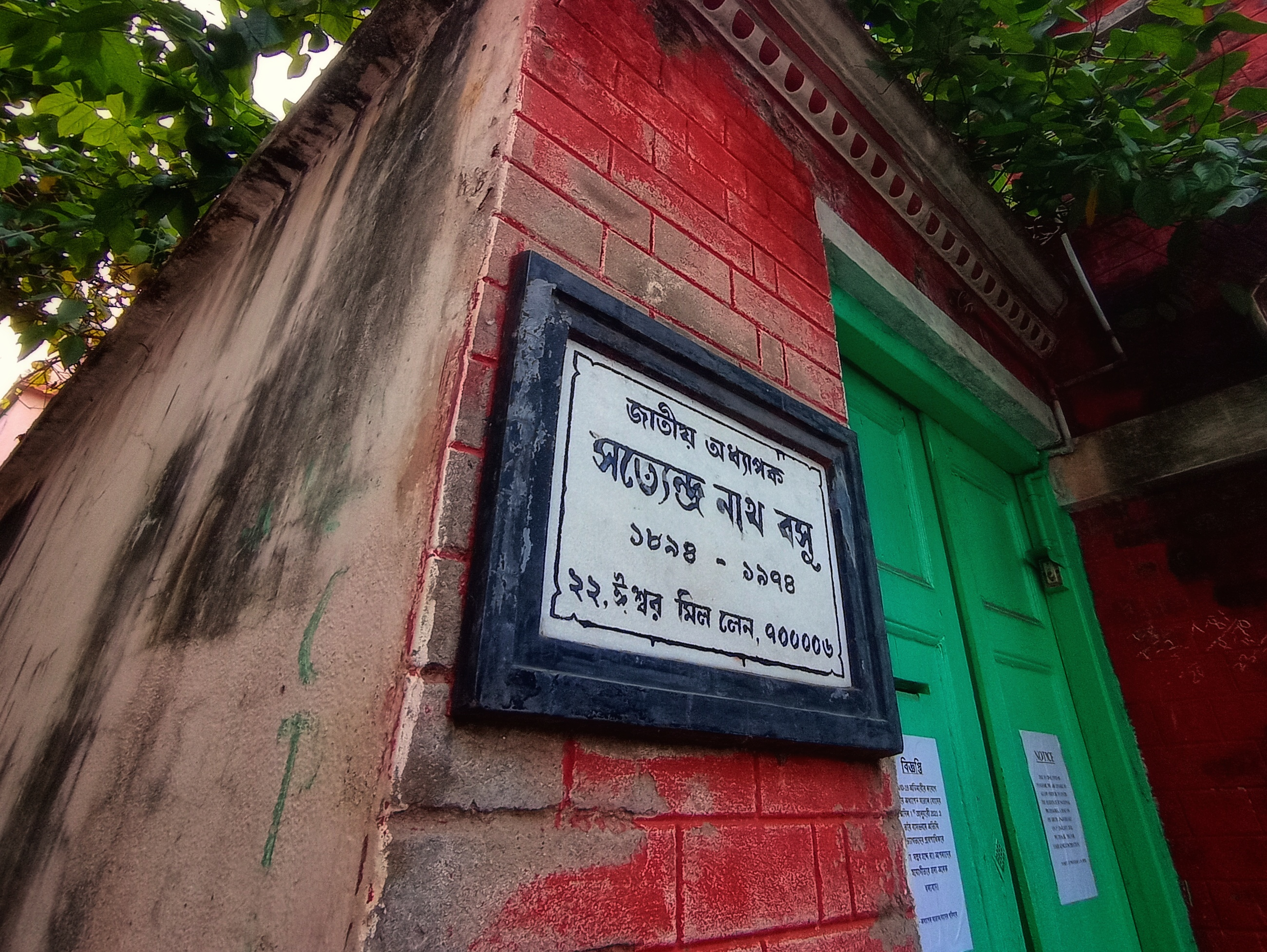
Satyendra Nath Bose Residence (22, Ishwar Mill Lane, Kolkata) Entrance & Name Plate

Bose was born in Calcutta (now Kolkata), the eldest of seven children in a Bengali Kayastha family. Bose's father was Surendra Nath. Bose's mother was (Smt.) Amodini Debi. Surendra was an accountant and worked in East India Railways. Bose was the only son, with six sisters after him. His ancestral home was in the village Bara Jagulia, in the district of Nadia, in the Bengal Presidency. His schooling began at the age of five, near his home. When his family moved to Goabagan, he was admitted into the New Indian School. In his final year of school, he was admitted into the Hindu School. He passed his entrance examination (matriculation) in 1909 and stood fifth in the order of merit. He then joined the intermediate science course at the Presidency College, Calcutta, where his teachers included Jagadish Chandra Bose, Sarada Prasanna Das, and Prafulla Chandra Ray.

Bose received a Bachelor of Science in mixed mathematics from Presidency College, standing first in 1913. Then he joined Sir Ashutosh Mukherjee's newly formed Science College where he again stood first in the Master of Science (MSc) mixed mathematics exam in 1915. His marks in the MSc examination created a new record in the annals of the University of Calcutta, which is yet to be surpassed.

After completing his MSc, Bose joined the Science College, Calcutta University as a research scholar in 1916 and started his studies in the theory of relativity. It was an exciting era in the history of scientific progress. Quantum theory had just appeared on the horizon and significant results had started pouring in.

His father, Surendranath Bose, worked in the Engineering Department of the East Indian Railway Company. In 1914, at age 20, Satyendra Nath Bose married Ushabati Ghosh, the 11-year-old daughter of a prominent Calcutta physician. They had nine children, two of whom died in early childhood. When he died in 1974, he left behind his wife, two sons, and five daughters.

As a polyglot, Bose was well versed in several languages such as Bengali, English, French, German and Sanskrit as well as the poetry of Lord Tennyson, Rabindranath Tagore and Kalidasa. In Europe, he impressed his host Jacqueline Zadoc-Kahn with his knowledge of Hebrew in literature and religion. He could play the esraj, an Indian instrument similar to a violin. He was actively involved in running night schools that came to be known as the Working Men's Institute.

== Research career ==
Bose attended Hindu School in Calcutta, and later attended Presidency College, also in Calcutta, earning the highest marks at each institution, while fellow student and future astrophysicist Meghnad Saha came second. He came in contact with teachers such as Jagadish Chandra Bose, Prafulla Chandra Ray and Naman Sharma who provided inspiration to aim high in life. From 1916 to 1921, he was a lecturer in the physics department of the Rajabazar Science College under University of Calcutta. Along with Saha, Bose prepared the first book in English based on German and French translations of original papers on Einstein's special and general relativity in 1919.

In 1921, Satyendra Nath Bose joined as Reader in the Department of Physics of the recently founded University of Dhaka (in present-day Bangladesh). Bose set up whole new departments, including laboratories, to teach advanced courses for MSc and BSc honours and taught thermodynamics as well as James Clerk Maxwell's theory of electromagnetism.

Bose, along with Indian Astrophysicist Meghnad Saha, presented several papers in theoretical physics and pure mathematics from 1918 onwards. In 1924, whilst a Reader in the Physics Department of the University of Dhaka, Bose wrote a paper deriving Planck's quantum radiation law without any reference to classical physics by using a novel way of counting states with identical particles. This paper was seminal in creating the important field of quantum statistics. Though not accepted at once for publication, he sent the article directly to Albert Einstein in Germany. Einstein, recognising the importance of the paper, translated it into German himself and submitted it on Bose's behalf to the Zeitschrift für Physik. As a result of this recognition, Bose was able to work for two years in European X-ray and crystallography laboratories, during which he worked with Louis de Broglie, Marie Curie, and Einstein.

=== Bose–Einstein statistics ===
While presenting a lecture at the University of Dhaka on the theory of radiation and the ultraviolet catastrophe, Bose intended to show his students that the contemporary theory was inadequate, because it predicted results not in accordance with experimental results.

In the process of describing this discrepancy, Bose for the first time took the position that the Maxwell–Boltzmann distribution would not be true for microscopic particles, where fluctuations due to Heisenberg's uncertainty principle will be significant. Thus he stressed the probability of finding particles in the phase space, each state having volume h^{3}, and discarding the distinct position and momentum of the particles. Bose's key departure was to treat light quanta as particles in a one-particle phase space divided into elementary cells of volume h^{3}. His probability law for distributing the quanta among those cells implied a new kind of statistical dependence between light quanta, a feature often described as their indistinguishability, and yielded Planck's law without recourse to classical electrodynamics.

Bose adapted this lecture into a short article called "Planck's Law and the Hypothesis of Light Quanta" and sent it to Albert Einstein with the following letter:

Respected Sir, I have ventured to send you the accompanying article for your perusal and opinion. I am anxious to know what you think of it. You will see that I have tried to deduce the coefficient 8π ν^{2}/c^{3} in Planck's Law independent of classical electrodynamics, only assuming that the ultimate elementary region in the phase-space has the content h^{3}. I do not know sufficient German to translate the paper. If you think the paper worth publication I shall be grateful if you arrange for its publication in Zeitschrift für Physik. Though a complete stranger to you, I do not feel any hesitation in making such a request. Because we are all your pupils though profiting only by your teachings through your writings. I do not know whether you still remember that somebody from Calcutta asked your permission to translate your papers on Relativity in English. You acceded to the request. The book has since been published. I was the one who translated your paper on Generalised Relativity.

Einstein agreed with him, translated Bose's papers "Planck's Law and Hypothesis of Light Quanta" into German, and had it published in Zeitschrift für Physik under Bose's name, in 1924.

Possible outcomes of flipping two coins
| Two heads | Two tails | One of each |

(1) There are three outcomes. What is the probability of producing two heads?

Outcome probabilities
| | | Coin 1 |
| | | Head | Tail |
| Coin 2 | Head | HH | HT |
| Coin 2 | Tail | TH | TT |

(2) Since the coins are distinct, there are two outcomes which produce a head and a tail. The probability of two heads is one-quarter.

The reason Bose's interpretation produced accurate results was that since photons are indistinguishable from each other, one cannot treat any two photons having equal energy as being two distinct identifiable photons. By analogy if, in an alternate universe, coins were to behave like photons and other bosons, the probability of producing two heads would indeed be one-third (tail-head = head-tail).

Bose's interpretation is now called Bose–Einstein statistics. This result derived by Bose laid the foundation of quantum statistics, and especially the revolutionary new philosophical conception of the indistinguishability of particles, as acknowledged by Einstein and Dirac. When Einstein met Bose face-to-face, he asked him whether he had been aware that he had invented a new type of statistics, and he very candidly said that no, he wasn't that familiar with Boltzmann's statistics and didn't realize that he was doing the calculations differently.

==== Bose–Einstein condensate ====
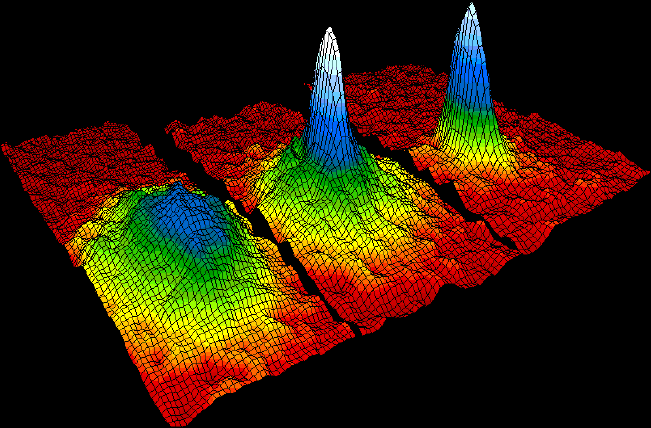
Velocity-distribution data of a gas of rubidium atoms, confirming the discovery of a new phase of matter, the Bose–Einstein condensate. Left: just before the appearance of a Bose–Einstein condensate. Center: just after the appearance of the condensate. Right: after further evaporation, leaving a sample of nearly pure condensate.

Einstein also did not at first realize how radical Bose's departure was, and in his first paper after Bose, he was guided, like Bose, by the fact that the new method gave the right answer. But after Einstein's second paper using Bose's method in which Einstein predicted the Bose-Einstein condensate (pictured left), he started to realize just how radical it was, and he compared it to wave/particle duality, saying that some particles didn't behave exactly like particles. Bose had already submitted his article to the British Journal Philosophical Magazine, which rejected it before he sent it to Einstein. It is not known why it was rejected.

Einstein adopted the idea and extended it to atoms. This led to the prediction of the existence of phenomena which became known as Bose–Einstein condensate, a dense collection of bosons (which are particles with integer spin, named after Bose), which was demonstrated to exist by experiment in 1995.

=== Dhaka ===
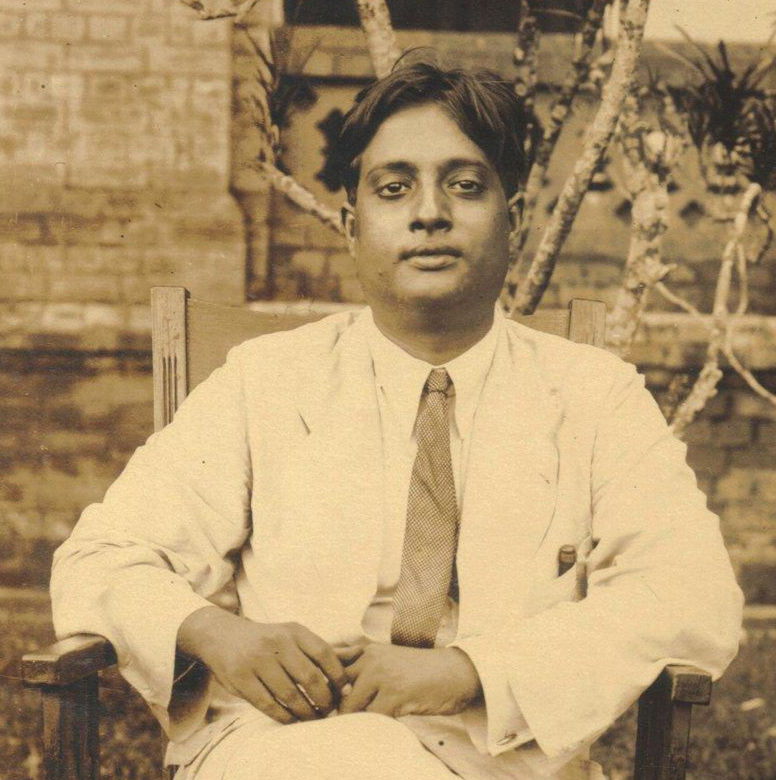
Bose at Dhaka University in the 1930s

After his stay in Europe, Bose returned to Dhaka in 1926. He did not have a doctorate, and so ordinarily, under the prevailing regulations, he would not be qualified for the post of Professor he applied for, but Einstein recommended him. He was then made Head of the Department of Physics at Dhaka University. He continued guiding and teaching at Dhaka University and was the Dean of the Faculty of Science there until 1945.

Bose designed equipment himself for an X-ray crystallography laboratory. He set up laboratories and libraries to make the department a center of research in X-ray spectroscopy, X-ray diffraction, magnetic properties of matter, optical spectroscopy, wireless, and unified field theories. He also published an equation of state for real gases with Meghnad Saha.

=== Calcutta ===
When the partition of India became imminent (1947), he returned to Calcutta (now known as Kolkata) and taught there until 1956. He insisted every student design their own equipment using local materials and local technicians. He was made professor emeritus on his retirement. He then became Vice-Chancellor of Visva-Bharati University in Santiniketan. He returned to the University of Calcutta to continue research in nuclear physics and complete earlier works in organic chemistry. In subsequent years, he worked in applied research such as extraction of helium in hot springs of Bakreshwar.

=== Other fields ===
Apart from physics, he did research in biotechnology and literature (Bengali and English). He made studies in chemistry, geology, zoology, anthropology, engineering and other sciences. Being Bengali, he devoted significant time to promoting Bengali as a teaching language, translating scientific papers into it, and promoting the development of the region.

== Honours ==
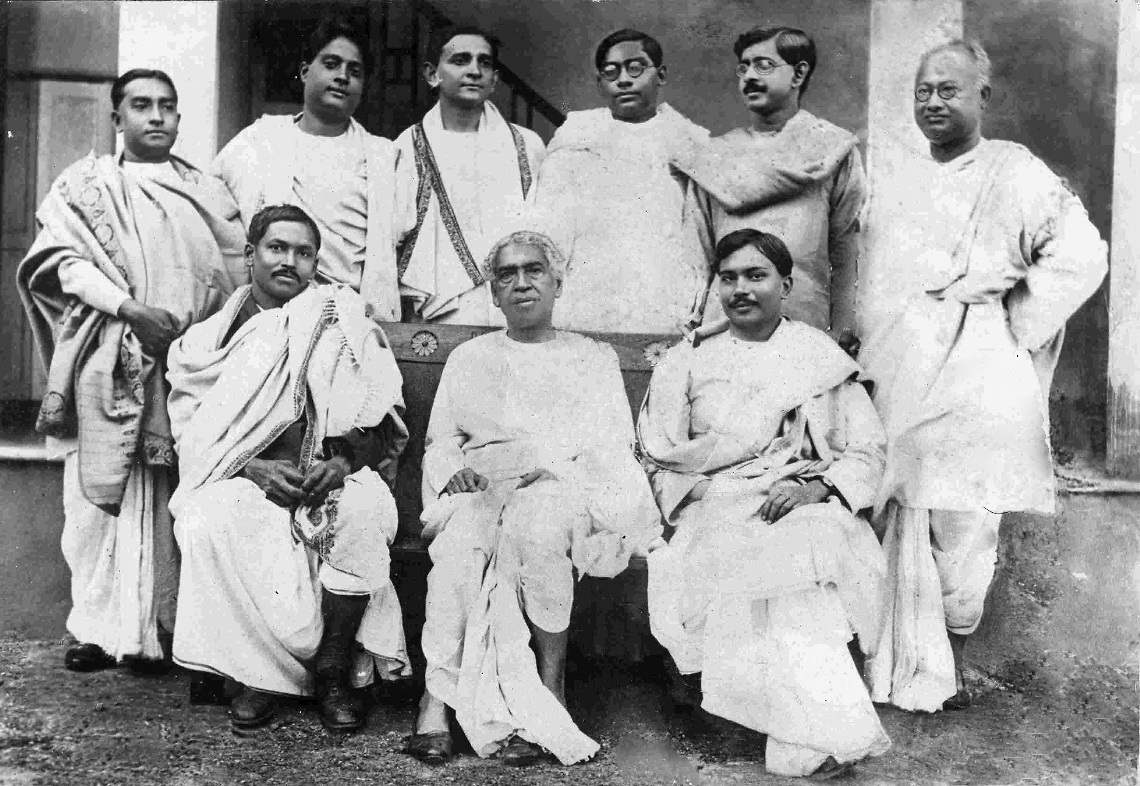
Bose with other scientists at the University of Calcutta

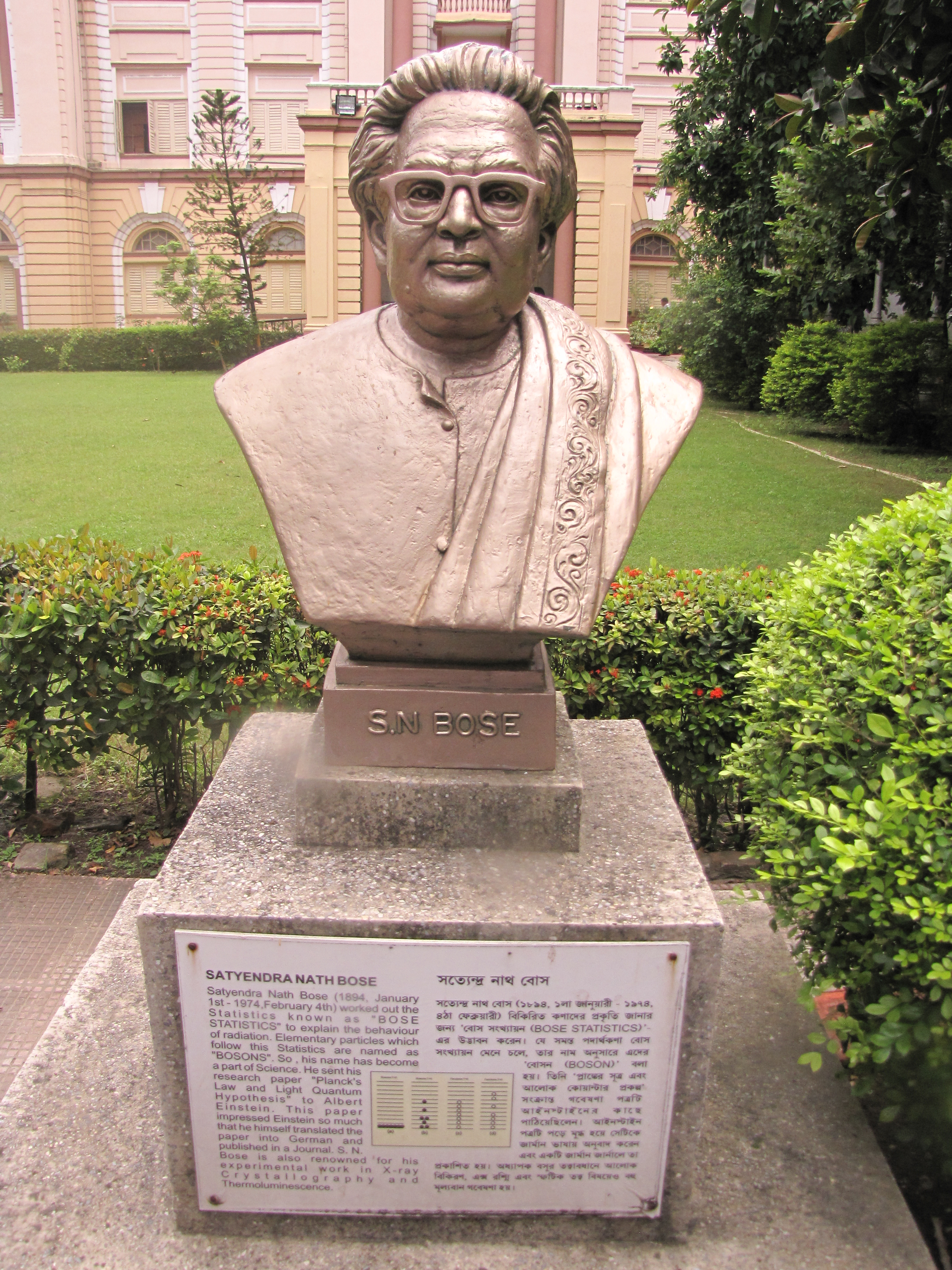
Bust of Satyendra Nath Bose in the garden of Birla Industrial & Technological Museum

In 1937, Rabindranath Tagore dedicated his only book on science, Visva–Parichay, to Satyendra Nath Bose. Bose was honoured with the title Padma Vibhushan by the Indian Government in 1954. In 1959, he was appointed as the National Professor, the highest honour in the country for a scholar, a position he held for 15 years. In 1986, the S.N. Bose National Centre for Basic Sciences was established by an act of Parliament, Government of India, in Salt Lake, Calcutta.

Bose became an adviser to the then newly formed Council of Scientific and Industrial Research. He was the president of the Indian Physical Society and the National Institute of Science. He was elected general president of the Indian Science Congress. He was the vice president and then the president of Indian Statistical Institute. In 1958, he became a Fellow of the Royal Society. He was nominated as member of Rajya Sabha.

Partha Ghose has stated that

Bose's work stood at the transition between the 'old quantum theory' of Planck, Bohr and Einstein and the new quantum mechanics of Schrödinger, Heisenberg, Born, Dirac and others.

=== Nobel Prize nomination ===
Bose was nominated by K. Banerjee (1956), D.S. Kothari (1959), S.N. Bagchi (1962), and A.K. Dutta (1962) for the Nobel Prize in Physics, for his contribution to Bose–Einstein statistics and the Unified field theory. Banerjee, head of the Physics Department, University of Allahabad, in a letter of 12 January 1956 wrote to the Nobel Committee as follows: "(1). He (Bose) made very outstanding contributions to physics by developing the statistics known after his name as Bose statistics. In recent years this statistics is found to be of profound importance in the classifications of fundamental particles and has contributed immensely to the development of nuclear physics. (2). During the period from 1953 to date, he has made a number of highly interesting contributions of far-reaching consequences on the subject of Einstein's Unitary Field Theory." Bose's work was evaluated by an expert of the Nobel Committee, Oskar Klein, who deemed his work not worthy of the Nobel Prize.

== Legacy ==
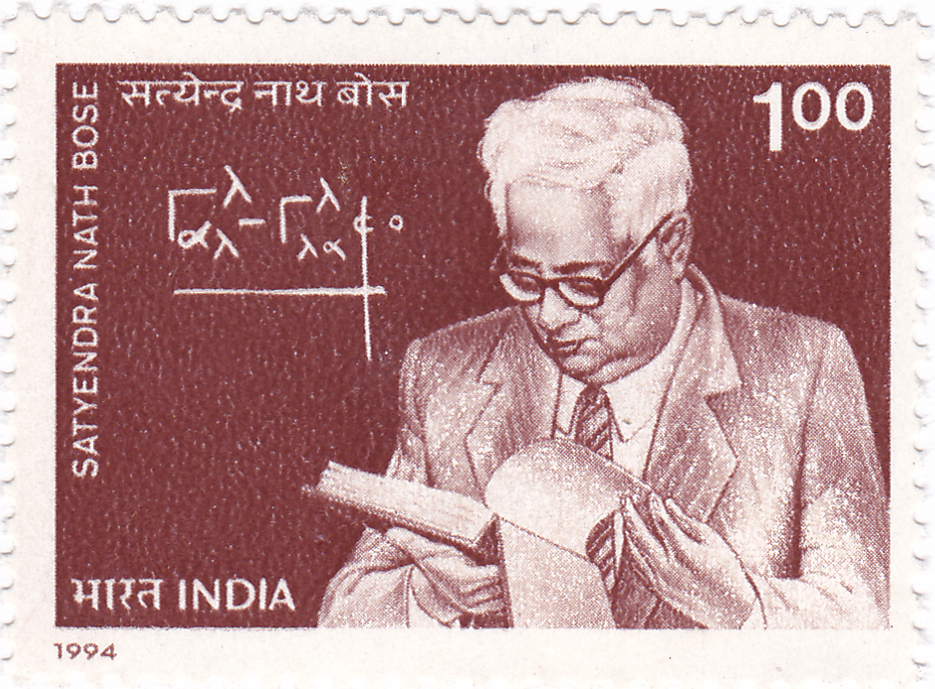
Bose on a 1994 stamp of India

Bosons, a class of elementary subatomic particles in particle physics were named by Dirac after Satyendra Nath Bose to commemorate his contributions to science.

Soviet Nobel laureate Lev Landau kept a list of names of physicists which he ranked on up to 5 on a logarithmic scale of productivity with lower numbers being more productive. Albert Einstein was ranked 0.5. Landau awarded a rank of 1 to Bose along with the founding fathers of quantum mechanics, Niels Bohr, Werner Heisenberg, Paul Dirac and Erwin Schrödinger, and others. Landau ranked himself as a 2.5 but later promoted to a 2.

Although seven Nobel Prizes were awarded for research related to S N Bose's concepts of the boson, Bose–Einstein statistics and Bose–Einstein condensate, Bose himself was not awarded the Nobel Prize.

In his book The Scientific Edge, physicist Jayant Narlikar observed:

SN Bose's work on particle statistics (c. 1922), which clarified the behaviour of photons (the particles of light in an enclosure) and opened the door to new ideas on statistics of Microsystems that obey the rules of quantum theory, was one of the top ten achievements of 20th century Indian science and could be considered in the Nobel Prize class.

When Bose himself was once asked that question, he replied, "I have got all the recognition I deserve."

One of the main academic buildings of University of Rajshahi, the No 1 science building has been named after him.

The 4 June 2022 Google Doodle featured Bose, on the 98th anniversary of his sending his work to Einstein.

== Works (selection) ==
- Bose (1924), "Planck's Law and Light Quantum Hypothesis (Plancks Gesetz und Lichtquantenhypothese)", Zeitschrift für Physik (in German), 26 (1): 178–181, Bibcode:1924ZPhy...26..178B, doi:10.1007/BF01327326, S2CID 186235974.
- Bose, S.N. (1924), "Thermal Equation in the Radiation Field in the Presence of Matter (Warmegleichgeweit im Strahlungsfeld bei Anwesenheit von Materie)", Zeitschrift für Physik (in German), 27 (2): 384–393.

== Works on Bose ==
- Chatterjee, S. (1994). S. N.Bose : The Man and His Works. Kolkata: National Centre for Basic Sciences..
- Wali, Kameshwar C. (2009). Satyendra Nath : His Life and Times (Selected Works with Commentary). World Scientific Publishing. ISBN 978-9812790705..

== Notes ==
Academic offices
| Preceded by Indira Devi Chaudhurani | Upacharya, Vishwa Bharati; 1956–58 | Succeeded by Khitishchandra Chaudhuri |
