= Praphulla Chandra Guha =

Indian chemist and professor (1894–1962)

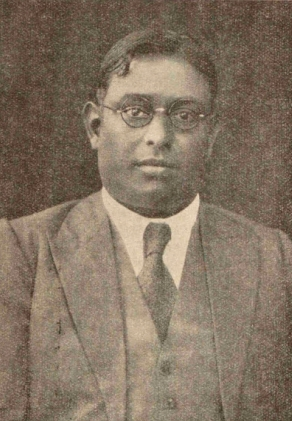

Praphulla Chandra Guha (15 February 1894 – 6 November 1962) was an Indian chemist and a professor of organic chemistry at the Indian Institute of Science.

Guha was born in Routhbhog, Bikrampur, Dacca District to Govinda Chandra and Brajalakshmi. He studied in the local school before joining Dacca College, receiving a BSc (1915) and MSc (1917). He studied under E.R. Watson at Calcutta University but following his departure he studied under P.C. Ray. He received a DSc in 1923 with a Palit Scholarship and subsequently a Premchand Roychand Scholarship. He then taught at the University of Dacca and took an interest in organic sulphur compounds. He moved to the Indian Institute of Science following the retirement of professor J.L. Simonsen to head the Organic Chemistry Department in 1928 and worked there until 1952. He returned to Calcutta where he died at his home in Ballygunge.

Guha married Nalinibala, daughter of Rajendra Lal Ghosh and they had nine sons and four daughters.
