= Bose Institute =

Research institution in Kolkata, India

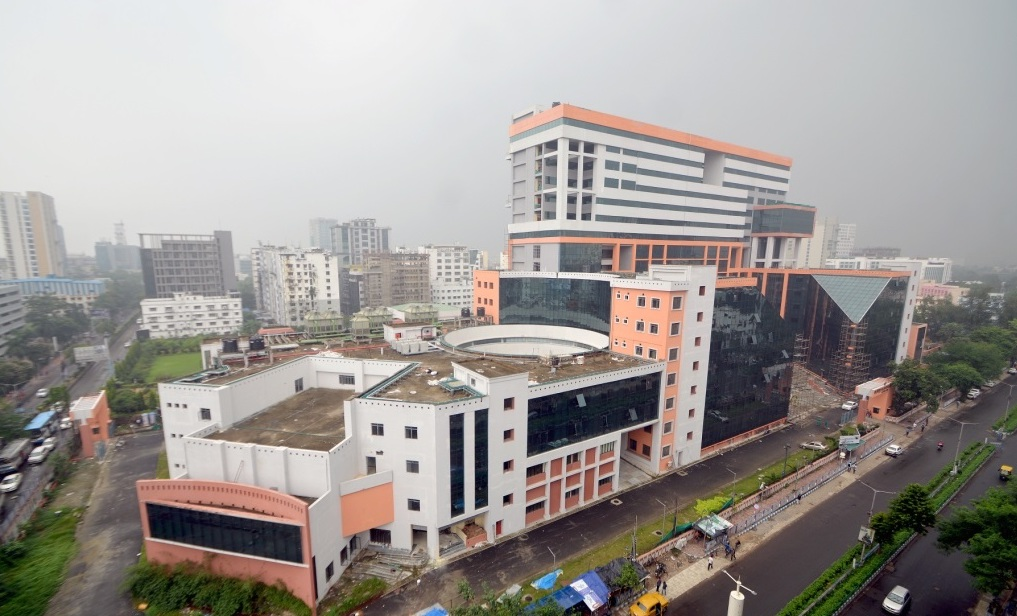
- Unified campus of Bose Institute
- Established: November 30, 1917; 108 years ago
- Research type: Interdisciplinary research
- Field of research: Plant Science; Structural Biology; Biochemistry; Biophysics; Synthetic Organic Chemistry; Medicinal Chemistry; Spectroscopy; Bioinformatics; Computational Biology; Theoretical Chemistry; Nuclear Astrophysics; High Energy Physics; Condensed Matter Physics; Complex Systems; Quantum Computation; Environmental Science
- Director: Kaustuv Sanyal
- Chairperson: Devang Vipin Khakhar
- Location: Kolkata, West Bengal, India; 22°34′47″N 88°14′30″E
- Campus: EN Block, Sector V, Bidhannagar, Kolkata, West Bengal 700091
- Founder: Jagadish Chandra Bose
- Operating agency: Department of Science and Technology
- Website: www.jcbose.ac.in

Bose Institute (or Basu Bigyan Mandir) is a premier public research institute of India for biological sciences, physical sciences and chemical sciences and also one of its oldest. The institute was established on 30 November 1917 by Acharya Sir Jagdish Chandra Bose, the pioneer of modern scientific research in the Indian subcontinent. Bose was its director for the first twenty years till his demise. Debendra Mohan Bose, who succeeded the Nobel laureate Sir CV Raman as Palit Professor of Physics at the University of Calcutta, was the director of Bose Institute for the next thirty years.

== Academics ==
=== Research ===
Current concentration of research is in the fields of biotechnology, plant biology, microbiology, molecular medicine, biochemistry, biophysics, bioinformatics, environmental science and physics. The institute pioneered the concept of interdisciplinary research in Asia and India in sync with global trends. The pioneering work of Jagadish Chandra Bose at the dawn of Bose institute on the effect of stimuli in plants was helpful in the establishment of the electrical nature of the conduction of various stimuli in plants. The institute has contributed to extremely important discoveries and has been home to internationally renowned researchers like Sambhu Nath De (discoverer of the cholera toxin), Debendra Mohan Bose (who pioneered the use of photographic emulsion plates in particle physics as attested by the Nobel laureate Sir C. F. Powell ) along with Bhibha Chowdhuri and others, Gopal Chandra Bhattacharya, Shyamadas Chatterjee (known for research on fusion) etc.

Directors
- Jagadish Chandra Bose, 1917–1937
- Debendra Mohan Bose, 1937–1967
- Sourindra Mohan Sircar, 1967–1975
- Sushil Kumar Mukherjee, 1976
- S.C. Bhattacharyya, 1977–1984
- Birendra Bijoy Biswas, 1985–1990
- P.K. Roy, 1992–2000
- Maqsood Siddiqui, 2001–2005
- Sibaji Raha, 2006–2016
- Uday Bandyopadhyay, 2019–2024
- Kaustuv Sanyal, 2024–present

=== Museum ===
Jagadish Chandra Bose himself started the display of his instruments which, as a continuous process, made their way into the present museum in the year 1986–87. The main purpose of this technological museum is to display and maintain some of the instruments designed, made and used by Sir J. C. Bose, his personal belongings and memorabilia. The museum is housed in the main campus at 93/1 A. P. C. road (formerly Upper Circular road) and is open on all weekdays.

=== Funding ===
Bose institute is funded by Department of Science and Technology, Govt of India.

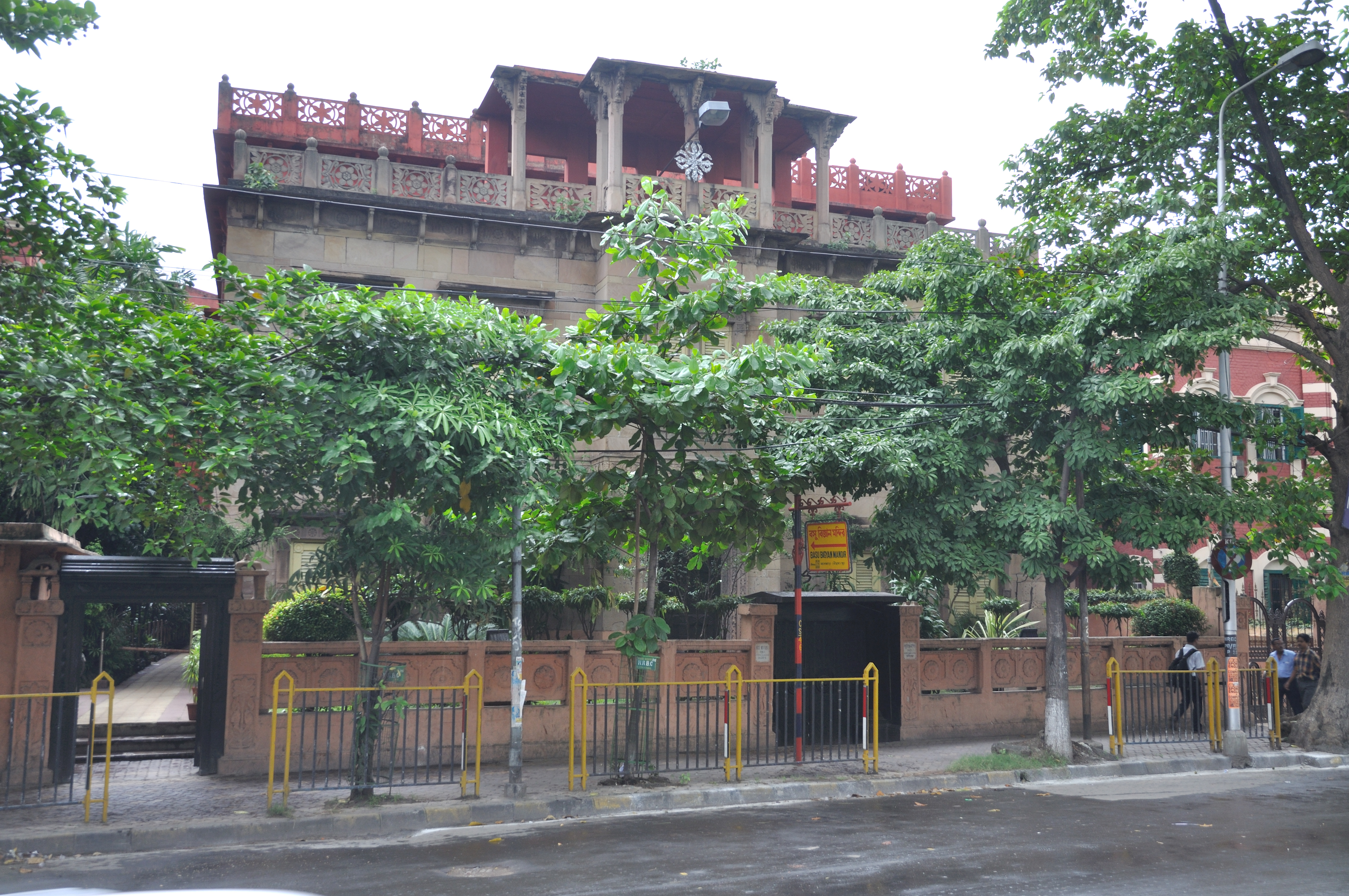

== Notable researchers ==
- Jagadish Chandra Bose – Physicist, biologist and botanist (1857–1937)
- Debendra Mohan Bose – Indian physicist (1885–1975)
- Gopal Chandra Bhattacharya – Indian entomologist (1895–1981)
- Bibha Chowdhuri – Indian cosmic ray physicist (1913–1991)
- Sambhu Nath De – Indian medical researcher (1915–1985)
- Probir Roy – Indian particle physicist (1942-2026)
- Indrani Bose – Indian physicist (born 1951)
- Siddhartha Roy – Indian scientist (born 1954)
- Dipankar Home – Indian physicist (born 1955)
- Joyoti Basu – Indian medical researcher (born 1957)
- Sampa Das – Indian biotechnologist
