= List of foreign recipients of the Ordre des Palmes Académiques =

Ordre des Palmes Académiques
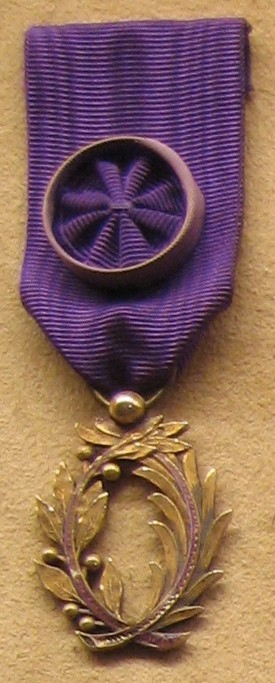
- Officier of the Order
- Awarded for: Distinguished contributions to education or culture
- Presented by: France
- Commandeur Officier Chevalier

The Ordre des Palmes Académiques (Order of Academic Palms) is an order of knighthood of France for academics and cultural and educational figures. The early Palmes académiques was instituted on 17 March 1808 and was only awarded to teachers or professors. In 1850 the decoration was divided into two known classes:

- Officier de l'Instruction Publique (Golden Palms);
- Officier d'Académie (Silver Palms).

Since 1955 the Ordre des palmes académiques has comprised three grades:

- Commandeur (Commander) — medallion worn on necklet;
- Officier (Officer) — medallion worn on ribbon with rosette on left breast;
- Chevalier (Knight) – medallion worn on ribbon on left breast.

In 1866, the scope of the award was widened to include major contributions to French national education and culture made by anyone, including foreigners. It was also made available to any French expatriates making major contributions to the expansion of French culture throughout the world.

The following is an incomplete list of foreign recipients of the Ordre, with sources of information as indicated:

== Argentina ==
=== Chevalier ===
- Olga Fernández Latour de Botas (2004), educator, folklorist and writer

== Armenia ==
Chevalier

- Marie Lou Papazian (2019), CEO at Tumo Center for Creative Technologies
- Aram Barlezizyan (2006), Armenian academic specialising in the French Language.

== Australia ==
Officier

- Evelyn Temple Emmett (1923), 'Father of Tasmanian Tourism'.
- Henry Tardent (1929), Swiss-born journalist and writer
- His Honour Judge Warren C Fagan, QC (2006), former president of the Administrative Appeals Tribunal of Victoria, former president de L'alliance Francaise de Melbourne, chevalier de Légion d'Honneur

Chevalier

- Edward Duyker (2000), Australian historian of French voyages to the Indian Ocean and Pacific in the eighteenth and early nineteenth centuries.
- Jane Zemiro (2000), Australian academic and author.
- Gretchen Bennett (2002), Australian teacher of the French language.
- Dr. Anthony Adames (2013), Australian teacher of the French language, honour conferred in Hong Kong.
- Jason McKenzie (2023), entrepreneur, former president of Alliance Française de Brisbane, former board director of the Alliance Française French Film Festival

== Azerbaijan ==
Officier

- Vazeh Asgarov (2021), earned the degree of doctor at the University of Strasbourg (2012), the executive director at French-Azerbaijani University (UFAZ) (from 2016).

== Bangladesh ==
Officier

- A. Majeed Khan, Bangladeshi educator and diplomat.

== Belgium ==
Officier

- Derrick Gosselin (2015) Member of the Royal Academy of Belgium.

== Belarus ==
Officier

- Vladimir Perlin (2003) – cellist, professor

Chevalier

- Galina Toumilovitch Charco (2004), formerly dean of Languages at European Humanities University, Minsk

== Brazil ==
Chevalier

- João Cruz Costa, Brazilian philosopher who taught in France after temporarily fleeing the military dictatorship in Brazil.
- Marilena Chauí (1992), Brazilian philosopher, professor at Universidade de São Paulo.

== Canada ==
Chevalier

- Roseann Runte (1985), vice-chancellor and president of Carleton University
- Charles Gonthier (1988), Puisne judge of the Supreme Court of Canada.
- Dyane Adam (1998), Canadian Govt Official Languages Commissioner responsible for promoting bilingualism.
- Robert (Robin) Inglis (1988) Maritime Historian, Director of the Vancouver Maritime Museum.
- A.J.B. Johnston (2008), historian
- Edward Langille (2004), professor of Modern Languages at St. Francis Xavier University.
- Paulette Collet (2007), professor emerita of French at University of St. Michael's College
- Robert Boily (2013), scientist
- Kenneth Meadwell (2013), professor of French Studies, University of Winnipeg
- Guy Berthiaume (2015), Librarian and Archivist of Canada at Library and Archives Canada
- Ruby Heap (2017), Canadian historian at the University of Ottawa
- Linda Cardinal (2013), political scientist
- Donald Ipperciel (2017), professor of philosophy
- Jean-Douglas Comeau (2017), Dean, French Immersion Program, Université St. Anne
- Edith Dumont (2018), 30th Lieutenant-Governor of Ontario
- Lace Marie Brogden (2019), Dean – Faculty of Education, St. Francis Xavier University
- Hatem Zurob (2024), professor of material sciences and engineering, McMaster University

== Colombia ==
Chevalier

- Belisario Ruiz Wilches (1937), engineer, astronomer, geographer, and founder of the Geographic Institute Agustín Codazzi

== Costa Rica ==
Officier

- Arturo Agüero Chaves (1963), philologist
- Victor Brenes Jiménez (date unknown), philosopher

== Croatia ==
Commandeur

- Guido Nonveiller (1989), entomologist and professor of the University of Belgrade.

== Denmark ==
Chevalier

- Asta Mollerup (1930s), modern dance teacher and director of the Danserindeskole (Girls Dancing School) in Copenhagen
- Marie-Louise Nosch, archaeologist specialising in prehistoric textiles

== Egypt ==
Commandeur

- Hussein Sobhy (1977), Mayor of Alexandria (1952–1966) and founder of the Biennale of Alexandria in 1954.

Chevalier

- Sherif Delawar (2012), Thinker in Economic Development and Visiting Professor of managerial Sciences.

== El Salvador ==
Chevalier

- Ana María Ábrego Figueroa (2023)

== Finland ==
Commendeur

- Markku Mannerkoski (1984)
- Marja-Riitta de la Chapelle (1986)
- Jarmo Anttila (1988)
- Christoffer Taxell (1988), politician
- Heikki Kirkinen (1992)
- Elisabeth Helander (1996)
- Pekka Jauho
- Raija Kallinen

Chevalier

- Tuomo Melasuo (2002), professor in Tampere Peace Research Institute

== Gambia ==
Chevalier

- Saihou Bah (2002) Principal French teacher (Alliance Francaise) and Promoter of French culture

Commandeur

- Sedat Jobe (....) Former Minister, Former UN officer, Lecturer at Dakar University (UCAD)

== Germany ==
Chevalier

- Iring Fetscher (1993), academic, political scientist and professor of the Goethe University Frankfurt.

== Greece ==
Chevalier

- Konstantinos (Kostis) Katsakioris (2016) Creator of the Exhibition "50 ans Asterix" with French Institute of Greece & Archaeological Museum of Thessaloniki
- Dionysis Simopoulos (2006), director of Evgenidio Foundation Planetarium.
- Eugenia Bezirtzoglou (2006), professor of microbiology, Medical School, Democritus University of Thrace

Officiers

- Eugenia Bezirtzoglou (2017),

Professor of Microbiology, Medical School, Democritus University of Thrace

== India ==
Chevalier

- Y. K. Sohoni (1975), professor at Poona University and CIEFL, Hyderabad; founder, Indian Association for French Teachers (1953).
- Manohar Rai Sardesai (1988), Konkani poet and translator.
- Neelima A. Raddi (1992), professor Fergusson College, Pune; translator; co-author of En Échanges (first Indian textbook for French); student of Prof. Y.K. Sohoni.
- Govindan Rangarajan (2006), professor, Department of Mathematics, Indian Institute of Science (IISc).
- Sampat Kumar Tandon (2009), geologist, former Pro-vice chancellor of Delhi University, Shanti Swarup Bhatnagar laureate.
- Chinmoy Guha (2010), Bengali intellectual, author, translator and professor of Calcutta University.
- Basabi Pal (2016), Associate Professor of French in West Bengal Education Service at Chandernagore College (Formerly College Dupleix), West Bengal.
- Meeta Ghosh (2019), Former Director of Alliance Française de Lucknow & Professor of French, Era University, Lucknow
- Nalini J.Thampi (2022), Professor of the Department of French at Pondicherry Central University, Puducherry and English and Foreign Language University, Hyderabad.
- Vasumathi Badrinathan (2023), Professor of French, Department of French Studies, Banaras Hindu University, Varanasi
- Dr. Navis Sybil Abarna Roy Morais (2023), HoD and Assistant Professor in French dept at Loyola College, Chennai. she is from Vembar.Thoothukudi district, Tamil Nadu.

Officier

- Kalya Jagannath Rao (2006), physical chemist, Shanti Swarup Bhatnagar laureate.

== Indonesia ==
Chevalier

- Ganjar Kurnia, Indonesian academist, Rector of Padjadjaran University (2007-2015), Educational and Cultural Attache Embassy of Indonesia, Paris
- Mahmud Syaltout, Indonesian lecturer-researcher on Western Europe Comparative Politics, Geopolitics, Cyberspace and Digital Diplomacy and Methodology of International Relations and Economic Intelligence at the University of Indonesia and Paramadina Graduate School of Diplomacy. He is also an activist of Gerakan Pemuda Ansor and LAKPESDAM Nahdlatul Ulama and currently working as a member of experts team of Ministry of Religious Affairs, H.E. Yaqut Cholil Qoumas. In 2020, Syaltout, a French political expert at the University of Indonesia, dared to speak bluntly about Macron not being anti-Islam. In 2017, on the orders of Yaqut Cholil Qoumas, Chairperson of Ansor Youth Movement, Syaltout led research on the massacre of the Rohingya ethnic group in Rakhine State, Myanmar, explaining that the conflict was a geopolitical conflict over natural resources, not a religious conflict and not just a violation of human rights, and at the same time offered the best scenarios for resolving the conflict based on the Game Theory approach. Also in 2017, Mahmud Syaltout together with Muhammad Zulkarnain and Alfon Satria Harbi, representing ANP-INSIGHT, a Business and Economic Intelligence company, won an academic poster competition in the field of Mixed-Methods at the 2017 MQIC Conference organized by MAXQDA in Berlin, Germany.

== Iran ==
Commandeur

- Ali-Akbar Siassi, Iranian intellectual, psychologist and politician during the 1930s and 1960s, government minister and Chancellor of Tehran University.

Chevalier

- Ahmad Kamyabi Mask, professor of Fine Arts in the University of Tehran during the 1980s and 1990s, writer, translator, publisher and scholar of French avant-garde theatre, influential in the study of Eugène Ionesco and Samuel Beckett.
- Javad Tabatabai, thinker and historian of Iranian modernity.
- Siamak Yassemi, professor of Mathematics at the University of Tehran.
- Reza Tavakkoli-Moghaddam, Professor of Industrial Engineering at the College of Engineering, University of Tehran.

== Ireland ==
Officier

- Henri O'Kelly, organist, choir director, music teacher
- Janie McCarthy, resistance worker during World War II in Paris, and language teacher

Chevalier

- James J. Browne, former President of NUI Galway
- Michael O'Dwyer, Head of Dept of French, Maynooth University, for his services to French Literary Studies.
- John Ringwood (2017), professor of Electronic Engineering in Maynooth University, for his contributions to marine renewable energy
- Louise Curtin (2017), teacher at Belvedere College, Dublin for her contribution to French debating
- Tony Lewis (2017), professor of Energy Engineering in University College Cork, for his contributions to marine renewable energy

== Israel ==
Commandeur

- Itamar Rabinovich, president of Tel Aviv University

Officier

- Menachem Banitt, Tel Aviv University
- Yirmiyahu Yovel, Hebrew University of Jerusalem, founder of International Spinoza Institute

Chevalier

- Hossam Haick, Technion - Israel Institute of Technology

== Ivory Coast ==
Officier

- Jacqueline Oble

== Japan ==
Chevalier

- Tomoko M. Nakanishi, chemical scientist, the University of Tokyo

== Kenya ==
Chevalier

- Dorothy Wanja Nyingi, Head of Ichthyology, National Museums of Kenya

== Lebanon ==
- Raymonde Abou, Director (1965–1999), Collège Louise Wegmann.
- Tiba Geha-Villard (2008), Director (2000–present), Collège Louise Wegmann.
- Chafic Maalouf, Lycee Franco Libanais 1977
- Marie-Christine Mogabert Mourani (2019), Vice-Présidente Sénior (1998-2017) International College
- Khalil Chalfoun (2019), Rector (2017–present), Université La Sagesse

=== Officier ===
- Dr Hassan Chalabi, Director (1996-2015), Islamic University of Lebanon

== Lesotho ==
- 'Masenate Mohato Seeiso (2018), Queen consort of Lesotho (2000–present)

== Malawi ==
Chevalier

- Boston Jaston Soko, African Literature (1990), University of Malawi.

== Malaysia ==
Officier

- Tengku Zatashah (2024), princess of Selangor and the president of Alliance Française de Kuala Lumpur.

== Mexico ==
- Efraín Huerta (1945), Mexican poet.
- Luz María Arteaga Machorro (2007), educator and founder of CESSA Universidad.

== Monaco ==
Commandeur

- Albert II of Monaco (2009).

== Namibia ==
- Buddy Wentworth, politician, for his contributions to the Namibian independence struggle.

== Netherlands ==
Officier

- Dolf Unger (1933), Rotterdam art dealer.

Chevalier

- Wim Meulen (1938)

== New Zealand ==
Commandeur

- Alec Goldsmith (2002), Polish-born RAF pilot and French language teacher who settled in New Zealand in 1961, for 22 years of organising exchanges with New Caledonian students.
- Ian Scott Laurie (1983), New Zealand-born professor of French at Flinders University and president of South Australian Alliances Francaises (appointed Officier in 1972).
- Keith Val Sinclair, New Zealand-born academic and professor of French at the James Cook University, North Queensland.

Officier since 1955 and Officier de l'Instruction Publique (Golden Palms) prior to 1955

- Walter Lawry Buller KCMG (1887), New Zealand politician, naturalist and ornithologist who was New Zealand Commissioner at the Colonial and Indian Exhibition in 1886.
- Percival Clay Neill, vice-consul for France 1878 to 1921.
- Frank Wild Reed (1934), translator, literary critic, biographer and devotee of Dumas; reaffirmed after appointment as Officier in 1927.
- William Marshall MacDonald (1947), president of the Wellington French Club (later Alliances Francaises).
- John Dunmore (1986), New Zealand academic, author on French history in the Pacific and long-time president of the New Zealand Federation des Alliances Francaises.
- Elizabeth Goulding (1991), New Zealand academic for her services to French language and culture
- Glynnis Cropp (2011), New Zealand academic, committee member of the Federation of the Alliances Francaises in New Zealand since 1981. Appointed Chevalier in 1991.

Chevalier since 1955 and Officier d'Académie (Silver Palms) before 1955

- Walter Kennaway CMG (1889), New Zealand politician, secretary to New Zealand High Commissioner London and representative at the 1889 Paris World fair and exhibition.
- Edward Robert Tregear (1896), New Zealand academic and politician, co-founder of the Polynesian Society.
- Edwin John Boyd-Wilson (1924), New Zealand academic and professor of Modern Languages at Victoria University, Wellington.
- James McRoberts Geddis (1926), author, journalist and editor of New Zealand Free Lance.
- M. M. Ifwersen (1934), president of the Mercantile Auxiliary Club and host of French warship visits to Auckland.
- Frederick Fisher Miles (1930s), New Zealand academic, professor of mathematics at Victoria University, Wellington, and president of the Cercle Française 1929–35.
- Allwyn Charles Keys, professor emeritus of French and Romance Philology at Auckland University and president of the Auckland French Club from 1943 to 1968.
- Lloyd Ernest Upton (1977).
- Mervyn Fairgray (1979), deputy principal Auckland Grammar School.
- Frances Huntington (1979).
- Jim Hollyman (1980), New Zealand academic at Auckland University for "services to French language and culture".
- Fred Woodward Marshall (1980), New Zealand academic at Waikato University for "services to French language and culture".
- Peter John Norrish (1980), New Zealand academic for "services to French language and culture".
- David Bancroft (1981), New Zealand academic at Canterbury University for "services to French language and culture".
- Raymond Gladstone Stone (1981), New Zealand academic for "services to French language and culture".
- Richard Goldsmith (1982).
- Cyril Peacock (1982).
- Graham Halligan (1984), New Zealand academic for "services to French language and culture".
- Ashley Day (1989), founded New Zealand National Association of French Teachers in 1986 and represented New Zealand at the World Congress of French Teachers in 1987.
- Jacqueline Ferry (1990), senior lecturer in the French Department of the School of European Languages and Literature at Victoria University of Wellington.
- Peter Morrow (1990).
- Peter Low (1990), New Zealand academic at Canterbury University for "services to French language and culture".
- Maurice Andre (1991).
- Tony Angelo (2003), Victoria University Law School professor with a long involvement at the Université de la Polynésie française (UPF).
- Barbara Dineen (2005), teacher at Columba College, Dunedin for "services to French language and culture" over a long period of time.
- Denis Fouhy (2005), Rotorua French teacher and organiser of exchanges with the College Jean Marrotti in Nouméa, New Caledonia.
- Jean Anderson (2006), chair of the French Department at Victoria University of Wellington.
- Marie Brown (2006), teacher of French and French literature from 1977 and especially president of the Alliances Francaises of Wellington from 2002 to 2004.
- Brian McKay (2006), former head of the University of Auckland's French department and current vice-president of the Alliance Française d'Auckland.
- Rosemary Arnoux (2007), Auckland University senior lecturer European Languages and Literature.
- Peter Tremewan (2007), New Zealand academic at Canterbury University for "services to French language and culture".
- Danielle Fillion (2010), president of the Waiheke French Club, in recognition of her efforts in promoting French culture.
- Stephanie Barnett (2010), a highly valued member of the community of French language teachers in New Zealand since 1981.
- Warren Henderson (2019) for services rendered to French culture.

== Niger ==
Commandeur

- Mariama Hima, Nigerien ambassador in France in 1996–2003.

== Nigeria ==
Officière

- Jihane Kasshanna (2025), Lebanese co-founder and Principal of the SFELK French-educated school in Northern Nigeria, the only one of its kind

== Norway ==
Officier

- Asbjørn Aarnes (1984), Norwegian literary historian, professor at the University of Oslo.
- Valborg Aschehoug, Norwegian chemical engineer, bacteriologist at Hermetikkfabrikkens laboratorium in Stavanger.
- Ambrosia Tønnesen, the first professional female sculptor in Norway

== Pakistan ==
- Ahmad Hasan Dani (1990), archaeologist.
- Azra Quraishi (2002), botanist.
- Iqrar Ahmad Khan (2015), to recognize his services in Agriculture and Education.

== Portugal ==
Chevalier

- Elísio Brandão (2000), economist at the University of Porto and Porto Business School; Rossas-born politician, now president of the Municipal Assembly of Arouca.

== Philippines ==
- Sotero Laurel (1986), Filipino politician and educator who served as a senator from 1986 until 1992.
- Emerita S. Quito, Filipino philosopher, professor emeritus and University Fellow at De La Salle University-Manila
- Leovino Ma. Garcia, Filipino philosopher
- Normelita Villajuan, professor of European Languages at the University of the Philippines
- Cecilia Fugoso-Chan, French professor at the University of the Philippines
- Erwin Thaddeus Bautista, French professor at the University of the Philippines
- Wystan de la Peña, author, translator, and professor of Spanish and French at the University of the Philippines
- Margaret Faith Cao, French professor

== Romania ==
Chevalier

- Emil Ceangă (2004), professor at the "Dunărea de Jos" University of Galați
- George Poede (2016), professor at the Alexandru Ioan Cuza University in Iasi.

== Russia ==
Chevalier

- Lyudmila Ulitskaya (2003), critically acclaimed modern Russian novelist and short-story writer.
- Olga Raevskaya (2020), Russian linguist, lexicographer, professor of philology, and specialist in French lexicology.

Officier

- Shubina Elena (2016), professor, doctor of chemical sciences, head of the Laboratory of Metal Hydrides, INEOS RAS.

== Saudi Arabia ==
- Hatoon al-Fassi (2008), women's rights activist and assistant professor of Women's History at King Saud University.
- Mohamed BEN LADEN (2008), Support and Promotion of the French Culture Lawyer and Chairman of MBL Law Firm

== Serbia ==
- Dušan T. Bataković, historian and diplomat
- Milena Dragićević Šešić, culturologist and university professor

== Slovenia ==
- Avrelija Cencič (2008), professor of the University of Ljubljana, researcher, manager and educator in health and life sciences.
- Andrejka Lorenčak (2021), professor of the First High School in Celje
- Miha Pintarič (2007), Prof. of French Lit at the Fac. of Arts (Univ. of Lj.); an author; a poet; Vice-Dean for research and int. relations; retired as of Jan '23.
- Marija Rus (1921–2019), Romance philologist, professor of French, translator and poet

== South Africa ==
Officier

- Marie-Joséphine Whitaker (1985), Professor, University of the Witwatersrand, co-founder of the Association of French Studies of Southern Africa

== Sudan ==
- Hassan Warrag (2015), Professor and vice-chancellor at the University of Gezira.
- Nour Eldin Satti (2016), Doctor, Diplomat.
- Osman M Elkheir (2018), Doctor, Architect.
- Ahmed H. Fahal (2018), Professor of Surgery at the University of Khartoum, who especially in Mycetoma.

== Sweden ==
Officier d'Académie

- Svante Forsberg (1911), Ciseleur d’art Fontenay-aux-Roses

Officier

- Per Magnus Johansson (2006), psychoanalyst, psychotherapist and historian of ideas; associate professor of the University of Gothenburg

Chevalier

- Christophe Premat (2014), Swedish resident and French deputy for Northern Europe
- Dr. Anna Sjöström Douagi (2017), Founder of The Young Academy of Sweden and Vice President Science and Programs Nobel Prize Center

== Taiwan ==
Chevalier

- Sheue-Shya Hwang Zee (2013), Professor and Director of the Office of Public Affairs at the Fu Jen Catholic University.

== Tanzania ==
Officier

- Sospeter Muhongo, member of parliament and geologist.

== Thailand ==
Chevalier

- Somboon Pichayapaiboon (1979), Science Educator and Chemistry Professor, Ministry of Education. A founder of Technical Chemistry program for Vocational Education of Thailand.

Officier

- Associate Professor Dr. Kittichai Triratanasirichai (2018), President of Khon Kaen University, Thailand.

Commander

- Princess Maha Chakri Sirindhorn (1989), Thai princess.

== Togo ==
Commandeur

- Paul Ahyi (1985), Togolese artist, sculptor, architect, painter, interior designer and author.

== Turkey ==
Commandeur

- Cahit Arf (1994), Turkish mathematician.
- Tahsin Yücel (1997), Turkish translator, novelist, scholar

Chevalier

- Fatih Birol (2006), chief economist and director of Global Energy Economics at the International Energy Agency.
- Misel Tagan (2015), French teacher.
- Yomtov Garti (1964), Turkish mathematician and teacher
- Sevim Özkut.Turkish French teacher Lycee Saint Joseph (1986)
- Assoc. Prof. Dr. Bedri Kurtulus (2025), Bedri Kurtuluş is a Turkish hydrogeologist, professor, and international expert in groundwater modeling, environmental geosciences, and remote sensing. In recognition of his significant contributions to scientific collaboration between France and Turkey, he was appointed Chevalier (Knight) of the Ordre des Palmes Académiques in 2025 by the French Ministry of National Education.

Prof. Dr. Gül Baysan (Tekay) is a university teacher, teaching language and literature, Gazi University, Gazi Faculty of Education, Department of French, appointed Chevalier (Knight) dans l'Ordre des Palmes académiques in 2023

https://gazi-universitesi.gazi.edu.tr/view/news/293324/prof-dr-gul-tekay-baysan-a-palmes-acad-miques-sovalyelik-nisani-verildi

== Ukraine ==
- Anatoliy Mazaraki (2006) — Ukrainian scientist, rector of the Kyiv National University of Trade and Economics, Doctor of Economics, professor, academician of the National Academy of Educational Sciences of Ukraine.

== United Kingdom ==
Officier de l'Instruction Publique

- Sir Thomas Elliott, 1st Baronet, civil servant

Commandeur

- Peter Bayley (2006), Drapers Professor of French at the University of Cambridge and fellow of Gonville and Caius College, Cambridge
- Richard Cooper (2012), professor of French and fellow of Brasenose College, Oxford.
- Christina Howells, (2015), professor of French and fellow of Wadham College, Oxford.
- Ann Jefferson (2012), professor of French at the University of Oxford
- Douglas Johnson (1987), professor of French history at University College London
- Helena, Baroness Kennedy of The Shaws (2006), barrister, broadcaster and parliamentarian.
- Richard J. Parish, (2012), professor of French and fellow of St Catherine's College Oxford.
- Alan Raitt (1995), professor of French literature at the University of Oxford and Fellow of Magdalen College, Oxford

Officier

- Wendy Ayres-Bennett (2004), British linguistics scholar
- C. W. L. Bevan (1986), Welsh chemist and academic.
- Maud (M. A.) Cloudesley Brereton, social hygiene and domestic gas expert (1907).
- Anthony G. Constantinides (Officier 1996, Chevalier 1985), British academic, Imperial College London
- Michael Crawford (2001), British ancient historian and numismatist.
- Norman Hartnell (1939), British fashion designer, dressmaker to HM The Queen and HM Queen Elizabeth The Queen Mother.
- John Loughlin (2010), British academic and educator, a specialist in European territorial politics at Cambridge.
- Basil Markesinis (1992), Anglo-Greek professor of European Law and director of the Institute of European and Comparative Law.
- Paul Mellars (2004), professor of Prehistory and Human Evolution and fellow of Corpus Christi College, Cambridge.
- David Parris (1994), Former Senior Lecturer in French and Fellow Emeritus of Trinity College, Dublin.
- Roger Pearson (2005), professor of French and fellow of The Queen's College, Oxford.
- Philip Thody (1982), professor of French at the University of Leeds.
- Robert Spence (1995), Emeritus Professor of Information Engineering, Imperial College London.
- Christopher Warwick Thompson (1996), Emeritus Professor of French at the University of Warwick

Chevalier

- Donald Adamson (1986), author, historian, biographer (of Pascal) and visiting fellow of Wolfson College, Cambridge.
- James Platt, Director of the Central Bureau for Educational Visits and Exchanges, London.
- Celia Britton (2003), British scholar of French Caribbean literature and thought
- Herrick Chapman (2006), British historian.
- Robert Fox (1988), British historian.
- Sean Hand (2004), Deputy Pro-Vice-Chancellor (Europe), University of Warwick
- Dr. Hall Kathleen Mary, Treasurer, Alliance Française, Librarian/Treasurer, Oxford & District Esperanto Society, Senior lecturer Renaissance French
- Rosalyn Higgins (1988), professor of International Law and president of the International Court of Justice.
- Marian Hobson (1997), professor of French at Queen Mary, University of London
- Gregory B. Lee (2010), British academic, author, broadcaster and professor of Chinese and Transcultural Studies at the University of Lyon (Jean Moulin)
- John McManners (1991), Anglican clergyman and religious historian specialising in the history of the Church and other aspects of religious life in 18th-century France.
- Huw Morris (2011), academic registrar, Swansea University
- Brian Stobie (2012), international officer, Durham County Council
- Richard Gillingwater (2012), Dean of Bayes Business School (Formerly Cass Business School).
- Julian Swann, professor of the University of London and expert on early modern France
- Steve Wharton, University of Bath academic, social and cultural historian
- Dougal Campbell (2017), lecturer at the University of Glasgow.

== United States ==
Commandeur

- Thomas E. Lovejoy, conservationist, ecologist, University Professor at George Mason University
- Philip Werner Amram, lawyer and legal scholar, president of La Fondation de l'Ecole Francaise Internationale and legal adviser to the French Embassy.
- John Kneller (1916–2009), English-American professor and fifth President of Brooklyn College
- Harlan Lane, distinguished university professor of psychology at Northeastern University in Boston, Massachusetts.
- Richard Morimoto, Bill and Gayle Cook professor of biology at Northwestern University in Evanston, Illinois
- Marie Philip Haley, CSJ, PhD, Professor of French at the College of St. Catherine, St. Paul, MN
- John C. O’Neal, Professor Emeritus of French, Hamilton College, Clinton, NY

Officier

- Jane Robert, American educator and former president of the Federation of Alliances Françaises USA
- Joseph Roger Baudier (1949), for his work as a Catholic church historian and columnist writing about the traditions of France in New Orleans
- Mary Bonner, Texas etching print artist,
- Arnold Davidson, professor of philosophy at the University of Chicago.
- Terri Buchholz Hammatt, Board member, Council for the Development of French in Louisiana (CODOFIL)
- Jerry Hirsch (1994), professor of psychology and animal biology at the University of Illinois, Urbana-Champaign
- Norris J. Lacy, American scholar focusing on French medieval literature
- Pirie MacDonald, American portrait photographer, New York City civic leader, and peace advocate.
- Jeffrey Mehlman (1994), professor of French Literature at Boston University.
- Thaddeus Weclew,* one of the creators of the Academy of General Dentistry.
- Dr. Jacquelyne Hoy (2010) Founder of Lycee Franco-Americain International School and International School of Broward
- Erskine Gwynne (1936) Publisher of the Paris-based Boulevardier magazine

Chevalier

- Don R. Iodice Awarded in 1987.
- Eileen Angelini (20??), Dean, LeMoyne College, for research on Francophone culture in the US.
- Benjamin Barber (2001), political theorist.
- Leo Benardo (1973), Director of Foreign Languages, New York City School System
- Guy Bennett (2005), American academic specialising in French literature.
- Lee Bradley, (1996), emeritus assistant professor (French) at Valdosta State University (1967–1998, 2000–2012), Valdosta, GA; executive director of the Southern Conference on Language Teaching (1988–1999).
- Theodore E. D. Braun, Emeritus Professor of French at the University of Delaware; founding member of the American Society for Eighteenth-Century Studies, the International Society for Eighteenth-Century Studies, the Ibero-American Society for Eighteenth-Century Studies, and the Society for Eighteenth-Century French Studies
- Elizabeth Chaponot, Ph.D. (2009) Excellence in French Education, Head of School, Lycee International de Los Angeles
- Herbert Clemone De Ley Jr, professor of French at the University of Illinois.
- Lina Coen (1878–1952), American pianist and vocal coach of French and Dutch origin
- Olga Duhl (2015) Oliver Edwin Williams Professor of Languages, founder and Co-Chair of the Medieval, Renaissance, and Early-Modern Studies Program at Lafayette College, United States. An associate member of the Research Center, Textes et Cultures, Université de Bourgogne, Dijon, she is on the Editorial Board of the scholarly journal, Le Moyen français as its US correspondent, a Vice-President of the International Association for Middle French Studies, and a reviewer for Renaissance and Reformation/Renaissance et Réforme, and Literature and Theology.
- Richard Guidry (1995), Cajun cultural activist and educator who worked to save the French language in Louisiana.
- James F. Jones, preceptor in the Department of French and Romance Philology at Columbia University, and chair of the Department of Foreign Languages at Woodward Academy in Atlanta.
- Dorothy Donald (1966), professor of Spanish and French at Monmouth College (Illinois) for more than 40 years of service as a teacher of French.
- Henry Koffler (1977), president emeritus at University of Arizona.
- Francis L. Lawrence (1937–2013), classical drama and baroque poetry scholar, president of Rutgers University (1990–2002)
- Benjamin Lizotte (2022), The Paul M. Jourcin Chair of French Studies, Saint John's High School, Shrewsbury, MA.
- Joseph Lussier (1934), Québécois-American journalist, editor, and publisher who published La Justice, a French-language weekly in Holyoke, Massachusetts
- John A. Lynn, American military historian and lecturer at Northwestern University.
- Patricia Mainardi, professor of Art History and Women's and Gender Studies, City University of New York.
- Dr. Heather McCoy, professor of French at Penn State University
- Dr. Charles McKenna, Professor of Chemistry, University of Southern California
- Dr. Jean-Luc Moreau (2022), Professeur des Écoles, Supervisor Physical Éducation Program at Marseilles, France, Supervisor French Department at University of Fayetteville, Arkansas , Program Director Physical Education Department, professor of physical education at Lycée Français de Chicago
- Joseph S. Nye, Jr., American political scientist and former dean of the John F. Kennedy School of Government at Harvard University.
- Dr. Michael D. Oates (1939 - 2009), professor of modern languages at University of Northern Iowa.
- Dr. Paul D. Onffroy (1967), professor of foreign languages at Chico State College, Lieutenant Colonel US Army and Program Director USIS in Marrakech, Morocco.
- Dr Michael Picone, professor of French and Linguistics at The University of Alabama
- Dr. Deborah Reed-Danahay (2020), professor of sociocultural anthropology [The University at Buffalo, SUNY]
- Dr. Deborah Reisinger (1969), professor of French at Duke University
- Joëlle Rollo-Koster, professor of history at the University of Rhode Island
- Richard Shusterman, American pragmatist philosopher, and professor of philosophy at Florida Atlantic University.
- Alice Strange (2009), professor of French at Southeast Missouri State University.
- Dr. Joseph L. Tomchak (1988)
- Jean Mirvil (2009), innovative principal of Public School 73 located in the Bronx, NYC, put in place a dual immersion French English program to address the needs of the Francophone population.
- Catheline van den Branden (2018), American artist and former president of the French Library & Cultural Center, Alliance Française of Boston
- Shimon Waronker (2009), headmaster of The New American Academy, PS 770, an innovative new public school in Brooklyn, New York.
- Randall E. Westgren (2007), professor of agribusiness and entrepreneurship at the University of Illinois.
- Cathy Yandell (2019), W.I. and Hulda F. Daniell Professor of French and Francophone Studies, Carleton College.
- Heather A. West (2015), Associate Professor of French, Department of World Languages and Culture, Samford University.
- Dr. Elizabeth W. Poe (2016), professor of French medieval literature at Tulane University, New Orleans, LA.
- Moira Judas Smith (2019), beloved French teacher and Wilson "Woody" Sims, Sr. Endowed Chair of World Languages at The Webb School, Bell Buckle, TN. Her award was granted to her posthumously and was received by her daughter, Caroline Smith Pryor.
- Dr. Jolene Vos-Camy (2021), professor of French at Calvin University in Grand Rapids, MI.

== Vietnam ==
Chevalier

- Hoàng Xuân Sính, mathematician, founder of Thang Long University.
