= The New American Academy =

Coordinates: 40.66438°N 73.92787°W

The New American Academy PS 770
- The New American Academy building in 2021.

Location
- 60 East 94th Street; Crown Heights, Brooklyn, New York; United States

Information
- Type: Public school
- Established: 2010 (16 years ago)
- Head: Jessica Saratovsky
- Website: thenewamericanacademy.org

The New American Academy is a Crown Heights, Brooklyn, New York public school, PS 770, which opened in the fall of 2010.

== History ==
The school opened to kindergarten and first grade and will gradually grow with the students each year to include fifth grade. The school was founded by and is led by Shimon Waronker, who has a bachelor's degree from Rabbinical College of America and a master's degree from Touro College. The New American Academy puts sixty children in a single, large classroom. The New American Academy has four teachers with sixty students (for a 15:1 ratio) in one classroom. Waronker modeled The New American Academy after Phillips Exeter Academy's methods.

The New York City Department of Education withdrew a proposal to expand The New American Academy with a middle school after less than ten percent of The New American Academy's first class of third-graders passed state examinations in the spring of 2013 before a vote by the Panel for Educational Policy on October 30, 2013. Just two students out a class of twenty-two students passed the 2013 spring New York state math and reading tests. As of November 4, 2013, more than half of The New American Academy's first class (the class of 2010–2011) of forty first-graders were no longer enrolled or failed to be promoted to the fourth grade, city statistics show.
