= Wendy Bennett =

Wendy Bennett may refer to:

- Wendy Ayres-Bennett, English linguist
- Wendy Bennett (athlete), competitor in the 2001 AAA Championships
