= John Dunmore =

New Zealand writer and academic historian (1923–2023)

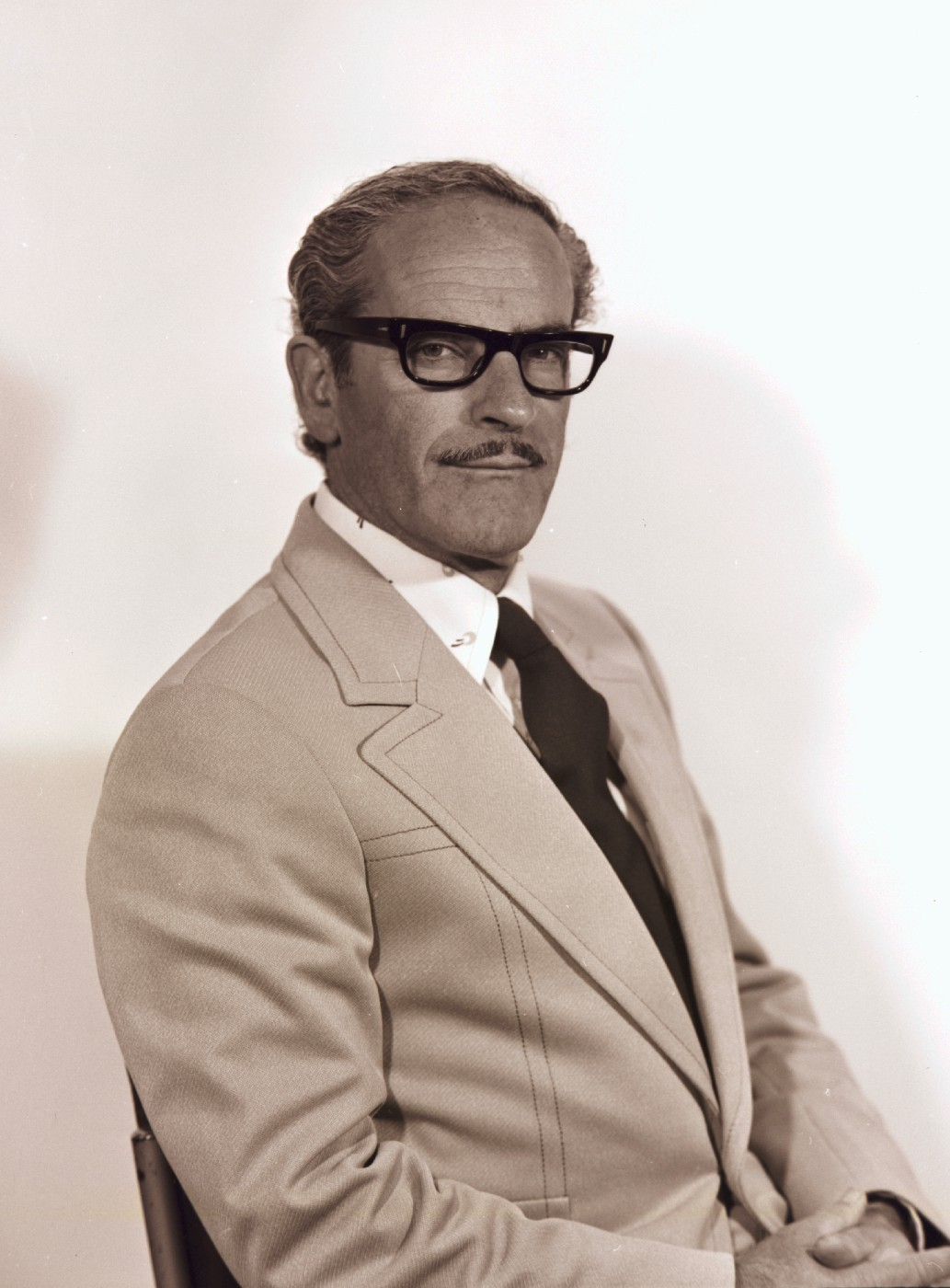
Dunmore in 1977

John Dunmore CNZM JP (6 August 1923 – 1 May 2023) was a French-born New Zealand academic, historian, author, playwright, and publisher.

== Biography ==
Dunmore was born in Trouville-sur-Mer, France, on 6 August 1923. He lived in Jersey under German occupation during World War II, and then in England, where he received a BA from the University of London. He emigrated to New Zealand in 1950. He completed a PhD under historian J. C. Beaglehole at Victoria University of Wellington in 1962, studying the French contribution to the exploration of the Pacific Ocean in the 18th century. He was professor of French, head of the Department of Modern Languages, and dean of Humanities at Massey University, from which he retired in 1985.

Dunmore's main field of history was the exploration of the Pacific, particularly by French navigators. He wrote two major biographies of La Pérouse, and translated and edited his journals (which he rediscovered after they had been misfiled in the French National Archives). In addition, he wrote biographies and edited the journals of both de Surville and of Bougainville. His biography of de Surville, The fateful voyage of the St. Jean Baptiste, won the Wattie Book of the Year award in 1970.

His work was highly regarded by scholars as well as by the public:

- "John Dunmore has done more than anyone to bring our attention to the achievements of eighteenth and nineteenth century French explorers of the Pacific"
- "cette étonnante biographie, élégamment écrite (this stunning and elegantly written biography (of Bougainville))"
- "The succinct and perceptive evaluation of the voyages and the Anglo-French rivalry is of great use"

Dunmore wrote a variety of other books, including a series of thrillers under the pseudonym "Jason Calder". He produced a book of 18th-century recipes, Mrs Cook's book of recipes for mariners in distant seas. Some of the recipes were derived from the logs of explorers of the day. He also wrote plays, held office in the Playwrights Association of New Zealand, and wrote a history of the association.

In his capacity as professor of French, Dunmore was president of the New Zealand Federation des Alliances Francaises, a post he held for twenty years.

Dunmore established two separate publishing firms, the Dunmore Press (1969–1984) and Heritage Press (1985–2004). The Dunmore Press, a substantial New Zealand publisher of academic books, eventually became part of the Thomson publishing group, in 2004.

Dunmore died on 1 May 2023, at the age of 99.

== Honours and awards ==
In 1990, Dunmore was awarded the New Zealand 1990 Commemoration Medal. In the 2001 Queen's Birthday Honours, he was appointed a Companion of the New Zealand Order of Merit, for services to literature and historical research.

The French Government appointed Dunmore as a Chevalier dans la Légion d'honneur (Knight of the Legion of Honor) in 1976, and an Officier dans l'Ordre des Palmes académiques (Officer of the Academic Palms) in 1986. He was promoted to Officier de la Légion d'honneur (Officer of the Legion of Honor) in 2007, becoming only the tenth New Zealander to hold this level of the order and the third New Zealander to be promoted to the superior rank of Officer after Lieutenant Colonel James Waddell and Nancy Wake.

Massey University awarded Dunmore an honorary DLitt degree in 2006. Fellow Pacific scholars honoured him with a Festschrift: Cropp, Glynnis M; Noel R Watts; Roger D J Collins; K R Howe, eds. (2005). Pacific journeys: Essays in honour of John Dunmore. Wellington, New Zealand: Victoria University Press. ISBN 0-86473-507-3.

The Dunmore Medal for research into French achievements and development in the Pacific is named after him.

Companion of the New Zealand Order of Merit (New Zealand) 2001
New Zealand 1990 Commemoration Medal (New Zealand) 1990
Officier de la Légion d'Honneur (France) 2007
Officier des Palmes académiques (France) 1986

== Books ==
This list of books by Dunmore is representative but by no means complete. He also wrote many articles, book chapters, reviews, plays and other items. A list of his scholarly writings to 2005 is included in Pacific Journeys at pp. 15–19.

=== Biographies ===
- Dunmore, John (2006). Wild cards: eccentric characters from New Zealand's past. Auckland, New Zealand: New Holland Publishers. ISBN 1-86966-132-X.
- Dunmore, John (2002). Mounsieur Baret: First woman around the world 1766–68. Auckland, New Zealand: Heritage Press. ISBN 0-908708-54-8.
- Dunmore, John (2006). Where Fate Beckons: The life of Jean-François de la Pérouse. Auckland, New Zealand: Exisle. ISBN 0-908988-53-2. Published also by ABC Books, Sydney, Australia.
- Dunmore, John (2005). Storms and Dreams. Louis de Bougainville: soldier, explorer, statesman. Auckland, New Zealand: Exisle. ISBN 0-908988-57-5. Published also by ABC Books, Sydney, Australia & University of Alaska Press, 2007, ISBN 9781602230002
- Dunmore, John (1985). Pacific Explorer: The life of Jean-François de la Pérouse, 1741–1788. Annapolis, MD: Naval Institute Press. ISBN 0-87021-519-1.
- Dunmore, John; Touchard, M-C (1986). La Pérouse : explorateur du Pacifique (in French). Paris: Payot. ISBN 2-228-14060-0. Translation of Pacific Explorer.
- Dunmore, John (1972). Norman Kirk: A Portrait. Palmerston North, New Zealand: New Zealand Books.
- Dunmore, John (1969). The fateful voyage of the St. Jean Baptiste: a true account of M. de Surville's expedition to New Zealand & the unknown South Seas in the years 1769–70. Christchurch, New Zealand: Pegasus.

=== Translated and edited journals of explorers ===
- Dunmore, John (2002). The Pacific journal of Louis-Antoine de Bougainville, 1767–1768. London: Hakluyt Society. ISBN 0-904180-78-6.
- Dunmore, John (1994). The journal of Jean-François de Galaup de la Pérouse, 1785–1788, vol. 1. London: Hakluyt Society. ISBN 0-904180-38-7.
- Dunmore, John (1995). The journal of Jean-François de Galaup de la Pérouse, 1785–1788, vol. 2. London: Hakluyt Society. ISBN 0-904180-38-7.
- Dunmore, John (1981). The expedition of the St. Jean-Baptiste to the Pacific, 1769–1770: from journals of Jean de Surville and Guillaume Labé. London: Hakluyt Society. ISBN 0-904180-11-5.

=== Other historical works ===
- Dunmore, John (2001). Playwrights in New Zealand: A short history of the Playwrights Association of New Zealand. Auckland, New Zealand: Heritage Press. ISBN 978-0-908708-51-2.
- Dunmore, John (2000). Chronology of Pacific History. Auckland, New Zealand: Heritage Press. ISBN 978-0-908708-49-9.
- Dunmore, John (1997). Visions & realities: France in the Pacific, 1695–1995. Waikanae, New Zealand: Heritage Press. ISBN 978-0-908708-41-3.
- Dunmore, John (1991). Who's who in Pacific navigation. Honolulu: University of Hawaii Press. ISBN 978-0-8248-1350-5.
- Dunmore, John (1991). Around the shining waters: a history of Featherston County Council. Waikanae, New Zealand: Heritage Press. ISBN 978-0-908708-22-2.
- Dunmore, John; Maurice de Brossard (1985). Le Voyage de Lapérouse (2 volumes) (in French). Paris: Imprimerie nationale. ISBN 978-2-11-080857-8.
- Dunmore, John (1965). French explorers in the Pacific. Vol 1: The eighteenth century. Oxford: Clarendon Press.
- Dunmore, John (1969). French explorers in the Pacific. Vol 2: The nineteenth century. Oxford: Clarendon Press. ISBN 978-0-19-821540-0.

=== Fiction ===
"Jason Calder" is a pseudonym for John Dunmore.

- Calder, Jason (1981). Target Margaret Thatcher. London: Hale. ISBN 0-7091-9272-X.
- Calder, Jason (1978). The O'Rourke affair. Palmerston North, New Zealand: Dunmore Press.
- Calder, Jason (1977). A wreath for the Springboks. Palmerston North, New Zealand: Dunmore Press. ISBN 0-908564-04-X.
- Calder, Jason (1976). The man who shot Rob Muldoon. Palmerston North, New Zealand: Dunmore Press. ISBN 0-908564-10-4.
- Dunmore, John (1971). Meurtre à Tahiti (Murder in Tahiti) (in French). Auckland, New Zealand: Longman Paul. ISBN 0-582-68761-6.
- Dunmore, John (1964). Le mystère d'Omboula (The mystery of Omboula) (in French). Hamilton, New Zealand: Paul's Book Arcade.

=== Other ===
- Dunmore, John (2006). Mrs Cook's book of recipes for mariners in distant seas. Auckland, New Zealand: Exisle. ISBN 0-908988-64-8. Also published by the Australian National Maritime Museum.
- Dunmore, John (2006). La Peyrouse dans l'Isle de Tahiti (La Pérouse in the island of Tahiti) (in French). Anonymous (1806). London: Modern Humanities Research Association. ISBN 0-947623-72-8.
- Dunmore, John (1998). I remember tomorrow: an autobiography. Waikanae, New Zealand: Heritage Press. ISBN 0-908708-44-0.
- Dunmore, John (1993). The playwright's workbook: A practical manual to help you craft a better play. Waikanae, New Zealand: Heritage Press. ISBN 0-908708-30-0.
- Dunmore, John (1973). An Anthology of French Scientific Prose (in French and English). London: Hutchinson Educational. ISBN 0-09-112331-3.
- Dunmore, John (1968). Success at university: a practical guide. Christchurch, New Zealand: Whitcombe and Tombs.

== See also ==
- List of foreign recipients of the Légion d'Honneur
- List of Foreign recipients of the Ordre des Palmes Académiques
