= French-Azerbaijani University =

University in Baku, Azerbaijan

Coordinates: 40.3766°N 49.8515°E

- Azərbaycan-Fransız Universiteti
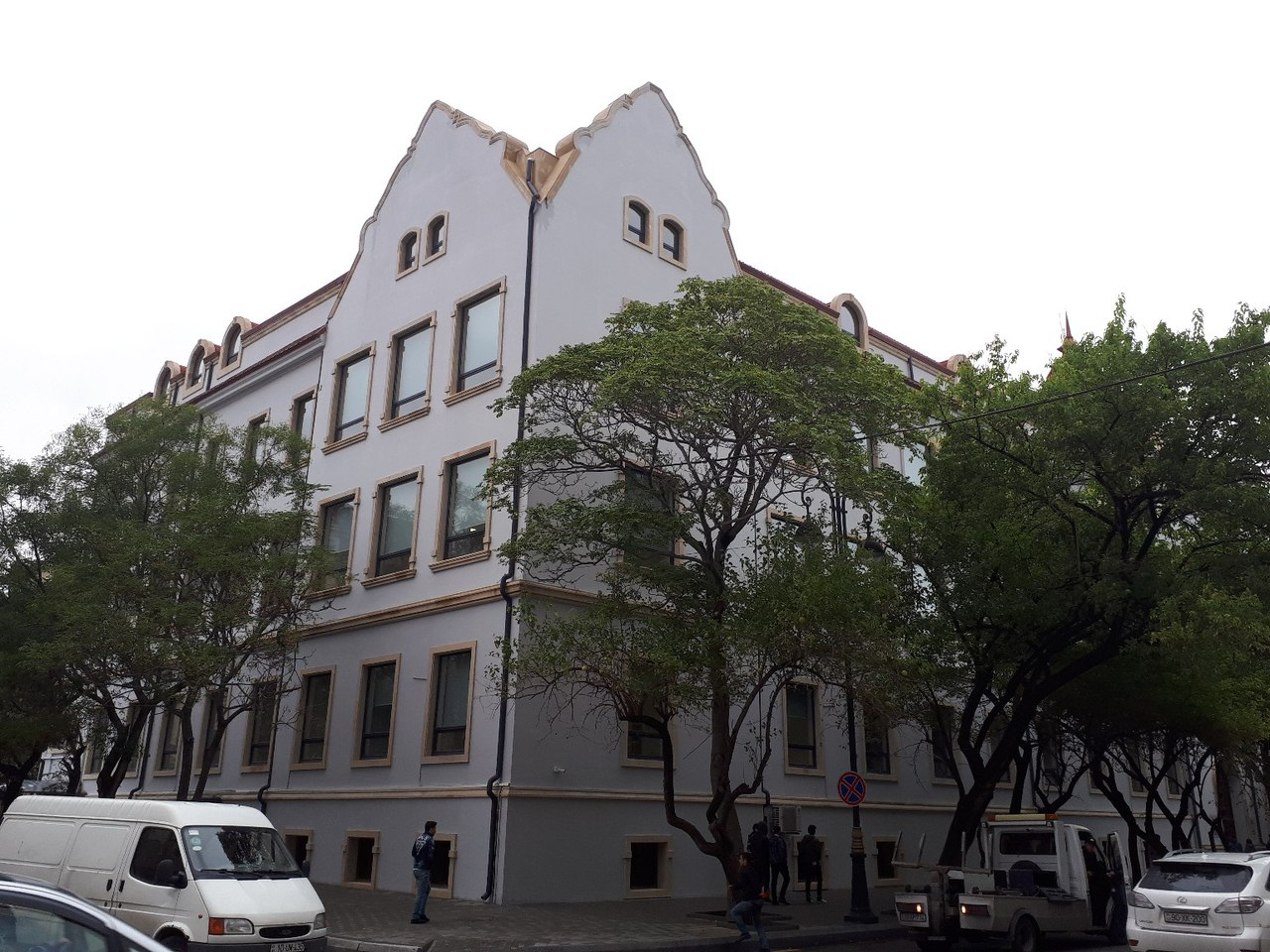
- UFAZ building at Nizami Street
- Type: Joint university
- Established: 2016
- Parent institution: Azerbaijan State Oil and Industry University; Strasbourg University
- Rector: Vazeh Asgarov
- Academic staff: 70
- Students: 800
- Location: Baku, Azerbaijan
- Website: www.ufaz.az

The French-Azerbaijani University (Azerbaijani: Azərbaycan-Fransız Universiteti, French: L'Université franco-azerbaïdjanaise, UFAZ) was created in 2016 on the initiative of Azerbaijani President Ilham Aliyev and French President François Hollande as a joint project led by the University of Strasbourg and the Azerbaijan State Oil and Industry University (ASOIU).

== History ==
On May 12, 2014, during the visit of the French President François Hollande to Azerbaijan, the Ministers of Education of France and Azerbaijan signed a Letter of intent focusing on cooperation between universities in order to strengthen educational ties between France and Azerbaijan.

Another Letter of intent was also signed by the Education Ministers of both countries on April 25, 2015 during the second official visit of François Hollande to Azerbaijan. On May 15 of the same year, the proposal for cooperation was approved by the President of the Republic of Azerbaijan by decree No. 1242, and on June 9, 2016, Ilham Aliyev signed an order about the implementation of the French-Azerbaijani University (UFAZ) project.

On September 15, 2016, the UFAZ inauguration ceremony was attended by the Minister of Education of Azerbaijan Mikayil Jabbarov and the French Ambassador to Azerbaijan Aurélia Bouchez. The first academic year of the UFAZ was housed in the main building of the Azerbaijan State Oil and Industry University (ASOIU).

On January 11, 2017, the UFAZ was visited by the French Secretary of State for Development and Francophonie Jean-Marie Le Guen, hosted by the Minister of Education of Azerbaijan, Mikayil Jabbarov, as well as the Presidents of the Universities of Strasbourg and Rennes 1.

The new premises of the UFAZ, located in a historical building at Nizami Street 183 and entirely renovated by the Ministry of Education of the Republic of Azerbaijan, were officially inaugurated on September 15, 2017. The ceremony was attended amongst others by the Minister of Education of the Republic of Azerbaijan, Mikail Jabbarov, the Rector of the Azerbaijan State Oil and Industry University Mustafa Babanli, the State Secretary under the Minister for Europe and Foreign Affairs of the French Republic, Jean-Baptiste Lemoyne, the Director General of Research and Innovation Department under the Ministry of Higher Education and Research of the French Republic Alain Beretz, the French Ambassador to Azerbaijan Aurélia Bouchez, the Vice-President of the University of Strasbourg Irène Jacoberger, and the President of the Foundation for Research in Chemistry of Strasbourg University, Bernard Meunier.

== Education ==
To be admitted to UFAZ, applicants at the Bachelor level must pass the national centralized entrance exam conducted by the State Examination Center of the Republic of Azerbaijan. Those who score at least 450 (previously 500) out of 700 (from the group 1) are allowed to register to the UFAZ-held entrance exam, organized annually in July in Baku, by the University of Strasbourg.

Teaching at UFAZ is conducted in the English language, and the academic content followed is one of the University of Strasbourg, and the University of Rennes 1 for the oil and gas engineering bachelor program.

To harmonize the 3-year undergraduate course in France with the 4-year bachelor program in Azerbaijan, the first year at UFAZ is a foundation year. The teaching staff consists of both French and Azerbaijani professors. Upon graduation, UFAZ graduates receive Azerbaijani (ASOIU) and French (University of Strasbourg or University of Rennes 1) national diplomas.

At present, the UFAZ counts 5 specialties at the Bachelor chemistry, chemical engineering, geophysical engineering, computer science, and oil and gas engineering.

Most UFAZ students, more than 80%, are scholarship holders who receive free education based on Azerbaijani government's financial support.

UFAZ will open new master's programs for the 2020/2021 academic year in the following areas: chemical engineering / physical chemistry, geosciences and applied computer sciences (big data and artificial intelligence).
