= Richard I. Morimoto =

American molecular biologist

- Born: Chicago, Illinois, U.S.
- Education: University of Illinois at Chicago; The University of Chicago
- Known for: Protein folding Heat shock response Molecular chaperones Neurodegenerative diseases Proteostasis
- Scientific career
- Fields: Molecular biology Biochemistry
- Workplaces: Northwestern University
- Doctoral advisor: Murray Rabinowitz

Richard I. Morimoto is a Japanese American molecular biologist. He is the William and Gayle Cook Professor of Biology and Director of the Rice Institute for Biomedical Research at Northwestern University.

== Education and academic career ==
He holds a B.S. from the University of Illinois at Chicago, received a Ph.D. in biology (laboratory of Professor Murray Rabinowitz) from The University of Chicago in 1978, and was a postdoctoral fellow in the (laboratory of Professor Matthew Meselson) and was a Tutor in Biochemical Sciences at Harvard University in Cambridge, MA. In 1982, Morimoto joined the faculty of the Department of Biochemistry, Molecular Biology, and Cell Biology at Northwestern University in Evanston, IL. He served previously as the Chair of Biochemistry, Molecular Biology, and Cell Biology, the Dean of The Graduate School, and the Associate Provost of Graduate Education at Northwestern University.

== Civic leadership ==
- Faculty liaison to founding of the Asian American Studies Program at Northwestern University – March, 1995
- Faculty Advisory Board – Asian American Studies Program at Northwestern University – 1999–present
- Midwest Buddhist Temple, Chicago, IL. – Board of Trustees, 2004–present; President, Board of Trustees, 2009 – 2014
- Japanese American Citizens League, Japanese American of the Biennium, 2010
- Chicago Nikkei Forum, 2014–present
- Board of Trustees and the Board of Governors Japanese American National Museum, 2014–present
- Japanese American Leadership Delegation, 2015, U.S.-Japan Council (USJC), Foreign Ministry of Japan

== Science ==
Morimoto is widely recognized for his research on the regulation of the heat shock stress response and the function of molecular chaperones. His current research is to understand how organisms sense and respond to physiologic and environmental stress through the activation of genetic pathways that integrate stress responses with molecular and cellular responses that determine cell growth and cell death. The stress of misfolded and damaged proteins influences neuronal function and lifespan at the level of the organism. Consequently, these studies provide a molecular basis to elucidate the underlying mechanisms of neurodegenerative diseases including Huntington's disease, Parkinson's disease, ALS, and Alzheimer's disease. His laboratory has published over 250 papers and three monographs including two books on the Heat Shock Response and Molecular Chaperones from Cold Spring Harbor Press. During that period he received two MERIT awards from the National Institutes of Health and has been supported by the grants from the National Institutes for General Medical Science, National Institutes of Aging, National Institutes for Neurological Diseases and Stroke, American Cancer Society, Huntington's Disease Society of America, the Hereditary Disease Foundation, and the ALS Association. In addition to giving frequent talks at universities and scientific symposia throughout the world, he has been a visiting professor at the Technion University in Israel, Osaka University, Kyoto University, Kyoto Sangyo University, University of Rome, Beijing University, Åbo Akademi University in Finland, and École Normale Supérieure in Paris. He is a founder of Proteostasis Therapeutics, Inc. in Cambridge, MA, a biotech company that is discovering and developing novel small molecule therapeutics designed to control the body's protein homeostasis. These novel therapies are designed to treat multiple degenerative disorders such as Alzheimer's disease, Parkinson's disease, Huntington's disease, cancer, and type II diabetes.

== Science recognition ==
- Dreyfus Distinguished Young Faculty Award, 1982
- American Cancer Society Faculty Research Award, 1987
- Elected Fellow of the American Association for the Advancement of Science, 1998
- National Institutes of Health Merit Award - National Institute for General Medical Science (2000), National Institute on Aging (2011)
- Huntington's Disease Society of America, Award for Excellence in Medicine, 2005
- Doctor of Philosophy, Honoris Causa – Åbo Akademi University, Turku, Finland, 2008
- Elected Fellow of the American Academy of Arts and Sciences, 2011
- University of Illinois, Alumni Achievement Award, 2011
- Commandeur, Ordre des Palmes Académiques, Ministry of Education, France, 2013
- Feodor Lynen Medal, 2014
- Japan Society for the Promotion of Science Fellow, 2015

== Significant papers ==
- Wu, B.; Hunt, C.; Morimoto, R.I. (1985). "The Structure and Expression of the Human Gene Encoding the Major Heat Shock Protein HSP70". Mol. Cell. Biol. 5 (2): 330–341. doi:10.1128/mcb.5.2.330. PMC 366716. PMID 2858050.
- Abravaya, K.; Phillips, B.; Morimoto, R.I. (1991). "Attenuation of the heat shock response in HeLa cells is mediated by the release of bound heat shock transcription factor and is modulated by changes in growth and in heat shock temperatures". Genes & Development. 5 (11): 2117–27. doi:10.1101/gad.5.11.2117. PMID 1936996.
- Sarge, K.; Zimarino, V.; Holm, K.; Wu, C.; Morimoto, R.I. (1991). "Cloning and Characterization of Two Mouse Heat Shock Transcription Factors with Distinct Inducible and Constitutive DNA Binding Ability". Genes & Development. 5 (10): 1902–1911. doi:10.1101/gad.5.10.1902. PMID 1717345.
- Abravaya, K.; Myers, M.; Murphy, S.; Morimoto, R.I. (1992). "Human Heat Shock Protein HSP70 Interacts with HSF, the Transcription Factor That Regulates Heat Shock Gene Expression". Genes & Development. 6 (7): 1153–1164. doi:10.1101/gad.6.7.1153. PMID 1628823.
- Jurivich, D.; Sistonen, L.; Kroes, R.; Morimoto, R.I. (1992). "Effects of Sodium Salicylate on the Human Heat Shock Response". Science. 255 (5049): 1243–1245. Bibcode:1992Sci...255.1243J. doi:10.1126/science.1546322. PMID 1546322.
- Lee, B.; Chen, J.; Jurivich, D.; Angelidis, C.; Morimoto, R.I. (1995). "Pharmacological Modulation of the Heat Shock Factor Activity by Anti-Inflammatory Drugs Protects Against Stress-Induced Cellular Damage". Proc. Natl. Acad. Sci. USA. 92 (16): 7207–7211. doi:10.1073/pnas.92.16.7207. PMC 41308. PMID 7638169.
- Freeman, B.C.; Morimoto, R.I. (1996). "The Human Molecular Chaperones HSP90, HSP70 (HSC70) and HDJ-1 have Distinct Roles in Recognition of a Non-native Protein and Protein Refolding". EMBO Journal. 15 (12): 2969–2979. doi:10.1002/j.1460-2075.1996.tb00660.x. PMC 450238. PMID 8670798.
- Freeman, B.C.; Toft, D.; Morimoto, R.I.; Chaperone Machines, Molecular (1996). "Chaperone Activities of the Cyclophilin CyP-40 and the Steroid Aporeceptor Associated Protein p23". Science. 274 (5293): 1718–1720. doi:10.1126/science.274.5293.1718. PMID 8939864. S2CID 333463.
- Kanei-Ishii, C. Tanikawa J. Nakai A. Morimoto R.I.; Ishii, S. (1997). "Activation of heat shock transcription factor 3 by c-Myb in the absence of cellular stress". Science. 277 (5323): 246–8. doi:10.1126/science.277.5323.246. PMID 9211854.
- Shi, Y. D. Mosser; Morimoto, R.I. (1998). "Molecular Chaperones as HSF1 Specific Transcriptional Repressors". Genes & Development. 12 (5): 654–666. doi:10.1101/gad.12.5.654. PMC 316571. PMID 9499401.
- Morimoto, R.I. (1998). "Regulation of the Heat Shock Transcriptional Response: Crosstalk between a Family of Heat Shock Factors, Molecular Chaperones, and Negative Regulators". Genes & Development. 12 (24): 3788–3796. doi:10.1101/gad.12.24.3788. PMID 9869631.
- Satyal, S.; Schmidt, E.; Kitagawa, K.; Sondheimer, N.; Lindquist, S.; Morimoto, R.I. (2000). "Polyglutamine Aggregates Alter Protein Folding Homeostasis in C. elegans". Proc. Natl. Acad. Sci. USA. 97 (11): 5750–5755. doi:10.1073/pnas.100107297. PMC 18505. PMID 10811890.
- Thress, K.; Song, J.; Morimoto, R.I.; Kornbluth, S. (2001). "Reversible Inhibition of Hsp70 Chaperone Function by Scythe and Reaper". EMBO Journal. 20 (5): 103–1041. doi:10.1093/emboj/20.5.1033. PMC 145500. PMID 11230127.
- Song, J.; Takeda, M.; Morimoto, R.I. (2001). "Hsp70-Bag1 Complex Mediates a Physiological Stress Signaling Pathway that Regulates Raf-1/Erk and Cell Growth". Nature Cell Biology. 3 (3): 276–282. doi:10.1038/35060068. PMID 11231577. S2CID 9081104.
- Shen, X.; Ellis, R.E.; Lee, K.; Liu, C.-Y.; Yang, K.; Solomon, A.; Yoshida, H.; Morimoto, R.; Kurnit, D.M.; Mori, K.; Kaufman, R.J. (2001). "Complementary Signaling Pathways Regulate the Unfolded Protein Response and Are Required for C. elegans Development". Cell. 107 (7): 893–903. doi:10.1016/s0092-8674(01)00612-2. PMID 11779465. S2CID 9165928.
- Morley, J. F.; Brignull, H. R.; Weyers, J. J.; R. I., Morimoto (2002). "The threshold for polyglutamine-expansion protein aggregation and cellular toxicity is dynamic and influenced by aging in Caenorhabditis elegans". Proceedings of the National Academy of Sciences of the United States of America. 99 (16): 10417–10422. Bibcode:2002PNAS...9910417M. doi:10.1073/pnas.152161099. PMC 124929. PMID 12122205.
- Morimoto, R.I. (2002). "Dynamic Remodeling of Transcription Complexes by Molecular Chaperones". Cell. 110 (3): 281–284. doi:10.1016/s0092-8674(02)00860-7. PMID 12176314. S2CID 9013678.
- Kim, S.; Nollen, E.A.A.; Kitagawa, K.; Bindokas, V.; Morimoto, R.I. (2002). "Polyglutamine Protein Aggregates are Dynamic". Nature Cell Biology. 4 (10): 826–831. doi:10.1038/ncb863. PMID 12360295. S2CID 16305135.
- Holmberg, C.; Staniszewski, K.; Mensah, K.; Chavez, A.; Matouschek, A.; Morimoto, R.I. (2004). "Inefficient Degradation of Truncated Polyglutamine Proteins by the Proteasome". EMBO Journal. 23 (21): 4307–4318. doi:10.1038/sj.emboj.7600426. PMC 524390. PMID 15470501.
- Morley, J.F.; Morimoto, R.I. (2004). "Regulation of Longevity in C. elegans by Heat Shock Factor and Molecular Chaperones". Mol. Biol. Cell. 15 (2): 657–664. doi:10.1091/mbc.e03-07-0532. PMC 329286. PMID 14668486.
- Brignull, H.; Moore, F.; Tang, S.; Morimoto, R.I. (2006). "Polyglutamine Proteins at the Pathogenic Threshold Display Neuron-Specific Aggregation in a Pan-Neuronal C. elegans Model". Journal of Neuroscience. 26 (29): 7597–7606. doi:10.1523/jneurosci.0990-06.2006. PMC 6674286. PMID 16855087.
- Gidalevitz, T.; Ben-Zvi, A.; Ho, K.; Brignull, H.; Morimoto, R.I. (2006). "Progressive Disruption of Cellular Protein Folding in Models of Polyglutamine Diseases ". Science. 311 (5766): 1471–1474. Bibcode:2006Sci...311.1471G. doi:10.1126/science.1124514. PMID 16469881. S2CID 8210087.
- Garcia, S.; Casanueva, M.O.; Silva, C.; Amaral, M.; Morimoto, R.I. (2007). "Neuronal Signaling Modulates Protein Homeostasis in Caenorhabditis elegans Postsynaptic Muscle Cells". Genes & Development. 21 (22): 3006–3016. doi:10.1101/gad.1575307. PMC 2049200. PMID 18006691.
- Balch, W. E.; Morimoto, R.I.; Dillin, A.; Kelly, J. W. (2008). "Adapting Proteostasis for Disease Intervention". Science. 319 (5865): 916–919. Bibcode:2008Sci...319..916B. doi:10.1126/science.1141448. PMID 18276881. S2CID 20952037.
- Morimoto, R.I. (2008). "Proteotoxic Stress and Inducible Chaperone Networks in Neurodegenerative Disease and Aging". Genes & Development. 22 (11): 1427–1438. doi:10.1101/gad.1657108. PMC 2732416. PMID 18519635.
- Prahlad, V.; Cornelius, T.; Morimoto, R.I. (2008). "Regulation of the Cellular Heat Shock Response in Caenorhabditis elegans by Thermosensory Neurons". Science. 320 (5877): 811–814. Bibcode:2008Sci...320..811P. doi:10.1126/science.1156093. PMC 3429343. PMID 18467592.
- Powers, E.T.; Morimoto, R.I.; Dillin, A.; Kelly, J.W.; Balch, W.E. (2009). "Biological and Chemical Approaches to Diseases of Proteostasis Deficiency". Annual Review of Biochemistry. 78: 959–991. doi:10.1146/annurev.biochem.052308.114844. PMID 19298183.
- Westerheide, S.D.; Anckar, J.; Stevens, S.; Sistonen, L.; Morimoto, R.I. (2009). "Stress-Inducible Regulation of Heat Shock Factor 1 by the Deacetylase SIRT1". Science. 323 (5917): 1063–1066. Bibcode:2009Sci...323.1063W. doi:10.1126/science.1165946. PMC 3429349. PMID 19229036.
- Ben-Zvi-A; Miller, E.A.; Morimoto, R.I. (2009). "The Collapse of Proteostasis Represents an Early Molecular Event in C. elegans Aging". Proc. Natl. Acad. Sci. USA. 106 (35): 14914–14919. doi:10.1073/pnas.0902882106. PMC 2736453. PMID 19706382.
- Åkerfelt, M.; Morimoto, R.I.; Sistonen, L. (2010). "Heat Shock Factors: Integrators of Cell Stress, Development, and Lifespan". Nature Reviews Molecular Cell Biology. 11 (8): 545–555. doi:10.1038/nrm2938. PMC 3402356. PMID 20628411.
- Gidalevitz, T; Prahlad, V; Morimoto, RI (June 2011). "The stress of protein misfolding: from single cells to multicellular organisms". Cold Spring Harb Perspect Biol. 3 (6) a009704. doi:10.1101/cshperspect.a009704. PMC 3098679. PMID 21536706.
- Prahlad, V; Morimoto, RI (2011). "Neuronal circuitry regulates the response of Caenorhabditis elegans to misfolded proteins". Proc Natl Acad Sci U S A. 108 (34): 14204–9. Bibcode:2011PNAS..10814204P. doi:10.1073/pnas.1106557108. PMC 3161566. PMID 21844355.
- Teixeira-Castro, A; Ailion, M; Jalles, A; et al. (August 2011). "Neuron-specific proteotoxicity of mutant ataxin-3 in C. elegans: rescue by the DAF-16 and HSF-1 pathways". Hum. Mol. Genet. 20 (15): 2996–3009. doi:10.1093/hmg/ddr203. PMC 3131043. PMID 21546381.
- Calamini, B.; Silva, C.; Madoux, F.; Hutt, D. M.; Khanna, S.; Chalfant, M.; Hodder, P.; Tait, B.; Garza, D.; Balch, W.; Morimoto, R.I. (2012). "Small Molecule Proteostasis Regulators for Protein Conformational Disease". Nature Chemical Biology. 8 (2): 185–196. doi:10.1038/nchembio.763. PMC 3262058. PMID 22198733.
- Morimoto, RI (2011). "The heat shock response: systems biology of proteotoxic stress in aging and disease". Cold Spring Harb Symp Quant Biol. 76: 91–9. doi:10.1101/sqb.2012.76.010637. PMID 22371371.
- Silva, M. C.; Fox, S.; Thakkar, H.; Beam, M. J. Rivera; Amaral, M. D.; Morimoto, R.I. (2011). "A Genetic Screening Strategy Identifies Novel Global Regulators of the Proteostasis Network". PLOS Genetics. 7 (12) e1002438. doi:10.1371/journal.pgen.1002438. PMC 3248563. PMID 22242008.
- Rampelt, H; Kirstein-Miles, J; Nillegoda, NB; Chi, K; Scholz, SR; Morimoto, RI; Bukau, B (2012). "Metazoan Hsp70 machines use Hsp110 to power protein disaggregation". EMBO J. 31 (21): 4221–35. doi:10.1038/emboj.2012.264. PMC 3492728. PMID 22990239.
- Labbadia, J.; Morimoto, R.I. (2013). "Huntington's Disease – Underlying Molecular Mechanisms and Emerging Concepts". Trends in Biochemical Sciences. 38 (8): 378–385. doi:10.1016/j.tibs.2013.05.003. PMC 3955166. PMID 23768628.
- van Oosten-Hawle, P.; Porter, R.; Morimoto, R. I. (2013). "Regulation of Organismal Proteostasis by Transcellular Chaperone Signaling". Cell. 153 (6): 1366–1378. doi:10.1016/j.cell.2013.05.015. PMC 3955170. PMID 23746847.
- Kirstein-Miles, J; Scior, A; Deuerling, E; Morimoto, RI (2013). "The nascent polypeptide-associated complex is a key regulator of proteostasis". EMBO J. 32 (10): 1451–68. doi:10.1038/emboj.2013.87. PMC 3655472. PMID 23604074.
- Guisbert, E.; Czyz, D. M.; Richter, K.; McMullen, P. D.; Morimoto, R. I. (2013). "Identification of a Tissue-Selective Heat Shock Response Regulatory Network". PLOS Genetics. 9 (4) e1003466. doi:10.1371/journal.pgen.1003466. PMC 3630107. PMID 23637632.
- Krammer, C.; Park, K.W.; Li, L.; Melki, R.; Morimoto, R.I. (2013). "Spreading of a Prion Domain from Cell to Cell by Vesicular Transport in C. elegans". PLOS Genetics. 9 (3) e1003351. doi:10.1371/journal.pgen.1003351. PMC 3610634. PMID 23555277.
- Ciryam, P; Morimoto, RI; Vendruscolo, M; Dobson, CM; O'Brien, EP (2013). "In vivo translation rates can substantially delay the cotranslational folding of the Escherichia coli cytosolic proteome". Proc Natl Acad Sci U S A. 110 (2): E132-40. Bibcode:2013PNAS..110E.132C. doi:10.1073/pnas.1213624110. PMC 3545769. PMID 23256155.
- Ciryam, P.; Tartaglia, G. G.; Morimoto, R. I.; Dobson, C. M.; Vendruscolo, M. (2013). "Neurodegenerative Diseases and Widespread Aggregation are Associated with Supersaturated Proteins". Cell Reports. 5 (3): 781–790. doi:10.1016/j.celrep.2013.09.043. PMC 3883113. PMID 24183671.
- Gidalevitz, G.; Wang, N.; Deravaj, T.; Morimoto, R.I. (2013). "Natural Genetic Variation Determines Susceptibility to Aggregation or Toxicity in a C. elegans model for Polyglutamine Disease". BMC Biology. 11 100. doi:10.1186/1741-7007-11-100. PMC 3816611. PMID 24079614.
- Silva, M. C.; Amaral, M. D.; Morimoto, R.I. (2013). "Neuronal Reprogramming of Protein Homeostasis by Calcium-Dependent Regulation of the Heat Shock Response". PLOS Genetics. 9 (8) e1003711. doi:10.1371/journal.pgen.1003711. PMC 3757039. PMID 24009518.
- Roth, DM; Hutt, DM; Tong, J; Bouchecareilh, M; Wang, N; Seeley, T; Dekkers, JF; Beekman, JM; Garza, D; Drew, L; Masliah, E; Morimoto, RI; Balch, WE (2014). "Modulation of the maladaptive stress response to manage diseases of protein folding". PLOS Biol. 12 (11) e1001998. doi:10.1371/journal.pbio.1001998. PMC 4236052. PMID 25406061.
- Kennedy, BK; Berger, SL; Brunet, A; Campisi, J; Cuervo, AM; Epel, ES; Franceschi, C; Lithgow, GJ; Morimoto, RI; Pessin, JE; Rando, TA; Richardson, A; Schadt, EE; Wyss-Coray, T; Sierra, F (2014). "Geroscience: linking aging to chronic disease". Cell. 159 (4): 709–13. Bibcode:2014Cell..159..709K. doi:10.1016/j.cell.2014.10.039. PMC 4852871. PMID 25417146.
- Brehme, M; Voisine, C; Rolland, T; Wachi, S; Soper, JH; Zhu, Y; Orton, K; Villella, A; Garza, D; Vidal, M; Ge, H; Morimoto, RI (2014). "A chaperome subnetwork safeguards proteostasis in aging and neurodegenerative disease". Cell Rep. 9 (3): 1135–50. doi:10.1016/j.celrep.2014.09.042. PMC 4255334. PMID 25437566.
- van Oosten-Hawle, P; Morimoto, RI (2014). "Organismal proteostasis: role of cell-nonautonomous regulation and transcellular chaperone signaling". Genes Dev. 28 (14): 1533–43. doi:10.1101/gad.241125.114. PMC 4102760. PMID 25030693.
- Shibata, Y; Morimoto, RI (2014). "How the nucleus copes with proteotoxic stress". Curr Biol. 24 (10): R463-74. Bibcode:2014CBio...24.R463S. doi:10.1016/j.cub.2014.03.033. PMC 4207067. PMID 24845679.
- Yu, A; Shibata, Y; Shah, B; Calamini, B; Lo, DC; Morimoto, RI (2014). "Protein aggregation can inhibit clathrin-mediated endocytosis by chaperone competition". Proc Natl Acad Sci U S A. 111 (15): E1481-90. Bibcode:2014PNAS..111E1481Y. doi:10.1073/pnas.1321811111. PMC 3992642. PMID 24706768.
- Tatum, MC; Ooi, FK; Chikka, MR; Chauve, L; Martinez-Velazquez, LA; Steinbusch, HW; Morimoto, RI; Prahlad, V (2015). "Neuronal serotonin release triggers the heat shock response in C. elegans in the absence of temperature increase". Curr Biol. 25 (2): 163–74. Bibcode:2015CBio...25..163T. doi:10.1016/j.cub.2014.11.040. PMC 4840938. PMID 25557666.
- Teixeira-Castro, A; Jalles, A; Esteves, S; Kang, S; da Silva Santos, L; Silva-Fernandes, A; Neto, MF; Brielmann, RM; Bessa, C; Duarte-Silva, S; Miranda, A; Oliveira, S; Neves-Carvalho, A; Bessa, J; Summavielle, T; Silverman, RB; Oliveira, P; Morimoto, RI; Maciel, P (2015). "Serotonergic signalling suppresses ataxin 3 aggregation and neurotoxicity in animal models of Machado-Joseph disease". Brain. 138 (11): 3221–37. doi:10.1093/brain/awv262. PMC 4731417. PMID 26373603.
- Nillegoda, NB; Kirstein, J; Szlachcic, A; Berynskyy, M; Stank, A; Stengel, F; Arnsburg, K; Gao, X; Scior, A; Aebersold, R; Guilbride, DL; Wade, RC; Morimoto, RI; Mayer, MP; Bukau, B (2015). "Crucial HSP70 co-chaperone complex unlocks metazoan protein disaggregation". Nature. 524 (7564): 247–51. Bibcode:2015Natur.524..247N. doi:10.1038/nature14884. PMC 4830470. PMID 26245380.
- Kirstein, J; Morito, D; Kakihana, T; Sugihara, M; Minnen, A; Hipp, MS; Nussbaum-Krammer, C; Kasturi, P; Hartl, FU; Nagata, K; Morimoto, RI (2015). "Proteotoxic stress and ageing triggers the loss of redox homeostasis across cellular compartments". EMBO J. 34 (18): 2334–49. doi:10.15252/embj.201591711. PMC 4570520. PMID 26228940.
- Labbadia, J.; Morimoto, R.I. (2015). "Repression of the Heat Shock Response is a Programmed Event at the Onset of Reproduction". Molecular Cell. 59 (4): 639–650. doi:10.1016/j.molcel.2015.06.027. PMC 4546525. PMID 26212459.
- Walther, DM; Kasturi, P; Zheng, M; Pinkert, S; Vecchi, G; Ciryam, P; Morimoto, RI; Dobson, CM; Vendruscolo, M; Mann, M; Hartl, FU (2015). "Widespread Proteome Remodeling and Aggregation in Aging C. elegans". Cell. 161 (4): 919–32. doi:10.1016/j.cell.2015.03.032. PMC 4643853. PMID 25957690.
- Labbadia, J; Morimoto, RI (2015). "The biology of proteostasis in aging and disease". Annu Rev Biochem. 84: 435–64. doi:10.1146/annurev-biochem-060614-033955. PMC 4539002. PMID 25784053.
- Yu, MS; Kim, BH; Kang, SH; Lim, DJ (2015). "Combined use of crushed cartilage and fibrin sealant for radix augmentation in Asian rhinoplasty". Plast Reconstr Surg. 135 (2): 293e–300e. doi:10.1097/PRS.0000000000001114. PMID 25626813. S2CID 40582922.
- Ciryam, P.; Kundra, R.; Freer, R.; Morimoto, R. I.; Dobson, C. M.; Vendruscolo, M. (2016). "A Transcriptional Signature of Alzheimer's Disease is Associated with a Metastable Subproteome at Risk for Aggregation". Proceedings of the National Academy of Sciences of the United States of America. 113 (17): 4753–4758. Bibcode:2016PNAS..113.4753C. doi:10.1073/pnas.1516604113. PMC 4855616. PMID 27071083.
- Li, J.; Chauve, L.; Phelps, G.; Brielmann, R.; Morimoto, R. I. (2016). "E2F Co-regulates an Essential HSF Developmental Program Distinct from the Heat Shock Response". Genes & Development. 30 (18): 2062–2075. doi:10.1101/gad.283317.116. PMC 5066613. PMID 27688402.
- Winter, P. B.; Brielmann, R. M.; Timkovich, N. P.; Navarro, H. T.; Teixeira-Castro, A.; Morimoto, R. I.; Amaral, L. A. N. (2016). "A Network Approach to Discerning the Identities of Visually Indistinguishable Organisms in a Free Moving Population". Scientific Reports. 6 34859. doi:10.1038/srep34859. PMC 5057085. PMID 27725712.
- Labbadia, J.; Brielmann, R.; Neto, M.; Lin, Y.-F.; Haynes, C. M.; Morimoto, R. I. (2017). "Mitochondrial Stress Restores the Heat Shock Response and Prevents Proteostasis Collapse During Aging". Cell Reports. 21 (6): 1481–1494. doi:10.1016/j.celrep.2017.10.038. PMC 5726777. PMID 29117555.
- Ciryam, P.; Lambert-Smith, I.; Bean, D. M.; Saunders, D. N.; Wilson, M. R.; Morimoto, R. I.; Oliver, S. G.; Dobson, C. M.; Vendruscolo, M.; Favrin, G.; Yerbury, J. J. (2017). "Tissue-specific Patterns of Supersaturation are Associated with Co-Aggregation in ALS Inclusion Bodies". Proceedings of the National Academy of Sciences of the United States of America. 114 (20): E3935–E3943. doi:10.1073/pnas.1613854114. hdl:11573/1277804. PMC 5441770. PMID 28396410.
- Sala, A. J.; Bott, L. C.; Morimoto, R. I. (2017). "Shaping Proteostasis at the Cellular, Tissue, and Organismal Level". Journal of Cell Biology. 216 (5): 1231–1241. doi:10.1083/jcb.201612111. PMC 5412572. PMID 28400444.
- Kundra, R.; Ciryam, P.; Morimoto, R. I.; Dobson, C. M.; Vendruscolo, M. (2017). "Protein Homeostasis of a Metastable Subproteome Associated with Alzheimer's Disease". Proceedings of the National Academy of Sciences of the United States of America. 114 (28): E5703–E5711. Bibcode:2017PNAS..114E5703K. doi:10.1073/pnas.1618417114. PMC 5514703. PMID 28652376.
- Li, J.; Labbadia, J.; Morimoto, R. I. (2017). "Rethinking the Roles of HSF-1 in Cell Stress, Development and Organismal Health". Trends in Cell Biology. 27 (12): 895–905. doi:10.1016/j.tcb.2017.08.002. PMC 5696061. PMID 28890254.
- Kirstein, J.; Arnsburg, K.; Scior, A.; Szlachcic, A.; Lys Guilbride, D.; Morimoto, R. I.; Bukau, B.; Nillegoda, N. B. (2017). "In vivo Properties of the Disaggregase Function of J-domain Proteins and Hsc70 in C. elegans Stress and Aging". Aging Cell. 16 (6): 1414–1424. doi:10.1111/acel.12686. PMC 5676055. PMID 29024389.
- Stoeger, T.; Gerlach, M.; Morimoto, R. I.; Amaral, L. N. (2018). "Large Scale Investigation of the Reasons why Potentially Important Genes are Ignored". PLOS Biology. 16 (9) e2006643. doi:10.1371/journal.pbio.2006643. PMC 6143198. PMID 30226837.
- Yu, A.; Fox, S. G.; Cavallini, A.; Kerridge, C.; O'Neill, M. J.; Wolak, J.; Bose, S.; Morimoto, R. I.; et al. (2019). "Tau Protein Aggregates Inhibit the Protein-Folding and Vesicular Trafficking Arms of the Cellular Proteostasis Network". Journal of Biological Chemistry. 294 (19): 7917–7930. doi:10.1074/jbc.RA119.007527. PMC 6514629. PMID 30936201.
- Morimoto, R. I. (2019). "Cell Non-Autonomous Regulation of Proteostasis in Aging and Disease". Cold Spring Harbor Perspectives in Biology. 12 (4) a034074. doi:10.1101/cshperspect.a034074. PMC 7111247. PMID 30962274.
- Morimoto, R. I. (April 2020). Morimoto, R. I.; Hartl, F. U.; Kelly, J. W. (eds.). "Cell Non-Autonomous Regulation of Proteostasis in Aging and Disease. Protein Homeostasis in Biology and Disease". Cold Spring Harbor Perspectives in Biology. 12 (4) a034074. doi:10.1101/cshperspect.a034074. PMC 7111247. PMID 30962274.
- Sala, A. J.; Bott, L. C.; Brielmann, R. M.; Morimoto, R. I. (2020). "Embryo Integrity Regulates Maternal Proteostasis and Stress Resilience". Genes & Development. 34 (9–10): 678–687. doi:10.1101/gad.335422.119. PMC 7197353. PMID 32217667.
- Sinnige, T.; Meisl, G.; Michaels, T. C. T.; Vendruscolo, M.; Knowles, T. P. J.; Morimoto, R. I.; et al. (2021). "Kinetic Analysis Reveals that Independent Nucleation Events Determines the Progression of Protein Aggregation in C. elegans". Proceedings of the National Academy of Sciences of the United States of America. 118 (11). doi:10.1073/pnas.2021888118. PMC 7980373. PMID 33836595.
- Capano, L. S.; Sato, C.; Ficulle, E.; Yu, A.; Horie, K.; Barthelemy, N. R.; Fox, S. G.; Karch, C. M.; Bateman, R. J.; Houlden, H.; Morimoto, R. I.; Holtzman, D. M.; Duff, K. E.; Yoo, A. S.; et al. (2022). "Recapitulation of Endogenous 4R Tau Expression Analogous to the Adult Brain in Directly Reprogrammed Human Neurons". Cell Stem Cell. 29 (6): 918–932. doi:10.1016/j.stem.2022.04.018. PMC 9176216. PMID 35659876.
- Morimoto, R. I.; Budinger, G.S. (2022). "Ch. 491: Protein Folding Disorders". In Loscalzo, J.; Fauci, A.; Kasper, D. L.; Hauser, S. L.; Longo, D. L.; Jameson, J. L. (eds.). Harrison's Principles of Internal Medicine. p. 21.
- Sala, A. J.; Morimoto, R. I. (2022). "Protecting the Future: Balancing Proteostasis for Reproduction". Trends in Cell Biology. 32 (3): 202–215. doi:10.1016/j.tcb.2021.09.009. PMC 8840976. PMID 34654604.

== In pop culture ==
In a YouTube video published in 2009, members of the Morimoto lab showed C. elegans forming a smiley face on a culture plate. The video description jokes that when a post doc in the lab told them to smile, the C. elegans, lacking faces as individuals, formed the smiley face as a group, suggesting that they are intelligent, have ears, and can work in groups. In reality, the footage is playing in reverse: the C. elegans were placed into that formation on the plate by a human and then crawled away. By reversing the footage, it looks like the C. elegans spontaneously form a smiley face. The video manipulation is hinted at in the description that reminds the viewers that the YFP is brighter in the individuals' head than their tails.
