= Moshe Reuven =

American rabbi and rapper

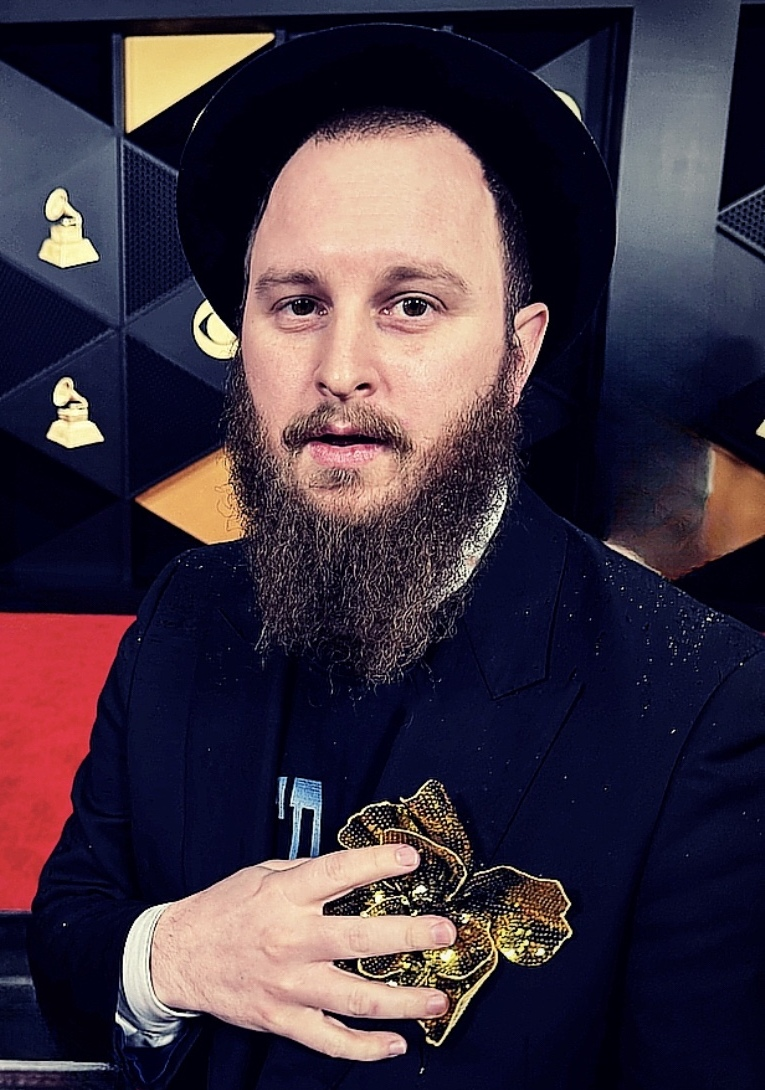
- Moshe Reuven in 2024

Background information
- Born: Hollywood, Florida, U.S
- Education: Cornell University,MBA; University of Central Florida; Rabbinical College of America
- Genres: Alternative hip hop; hip hop; jewish hip hop; ortho-pop
- Occupations: Singer-songwriter; rapper; entrepreneur; rabbi
- Instruments: Vocals; guitar
- Years active: 2020–present
- Website: moshereuven.com

Moshe Reuven Sheradsky (Hebrew: משה ראובן), known professionally as Moshe Reuven, is an American rabbi and musician currently based in New Jersey.

== Early life ==
Moshe Reuven Sheradsky was born and raised in Florida. In high school, he began making music with his friends and recording early material with Hayden, a former producer for Mr. Cheeks. Within the last years of high school and while studying at The University of Central Florida, he became increasingly more observant, delving deeply into Orthodox Judaism and devoting time to prayer and Torah study. Later, Sheradsky received rabbinic ordination (semicha) from the Rabbinical College of America.

== Career ==
Sheradsky released his debut single "You Are Not Alone" in 2020. He signed with Create Music Group in 2021. A collaboration with Julian Marley, titled "Say", followed in 2022, which they performed together for the first time in Miami, Florida that December. The compilation album, Hotline Miami, vol. 3 – featuring "You Are Not Alone" at track #10 on the physical CD version – reached No. 22 on Billboard 's Top 25 Chart for Hip-Hop & R&B for the week ending July 1, 2022. Sheradsky was the only Orthodox Jew to be invited to attend the 66th Annual Grammy Awards as an audience member in 2024. He wore a "Never Again Means Now" T-shirt and yellow ribbon in support of pro-Israel activism.

== Discography ==
=== Singles ===
- "You Are Not Alone", 2020
- "Say" (ft. Julian Marley), 2022
- "Holding Up My Hands", 2023
- "Red and Yellow", 2024

=== Studio albums ===
- The Poetry Tapes (spoken word mixtape), 2024
- The Reggae Tapes featuring Julian Marley (reggae mixtape), 2024
