= Christopher Warwick Thompson =

Professor Christopher W. Thompson

Christopher Warwick Thompson (born 31 December 1938) is an English academic and writer.

== Biography ==
Thompson was born in Stockholm, Sweden but registered as British at the consulate (his mother was Swedish). He now lives in London. Thompson studied for his Doctor of Philosophy degree at Clare College, Cambridge and holds the position of emeritus Professor of French at the University of Warwick.

Thompson's research on French Travel Writing is considered seminal, and his book French Romantic Travel Writing : Chateaubriand to Nerval (Oxford University Press, 2011) is described by Oxford University Press as "A groundbreaking overview of the Romantic travel book in France". The book was shortlisted for the 2012 R. H. Gapper Book Prize.

Thompson's other research focuses on the French Romantics; the works of the French writer, Stendhal; and French cinema, and consequently, the unusual birth of French ethnographic film. From 1996 to 2002 he frequently chaired festivals of the Comité du Film Ethnographique at the Musée de l'Homme in Paris. Thompson is also a founding member of the Fondation Jean Rouch, which works to preserve and promote the legacy of the pioneering French filmmaker and ethnologist Jean Rouch.

In 1996, Thompson's importance in the field of French studies was officially recognized when he was bestowed the high rank of Officier in the Ordre des Palmes Académiques, a prestigious French order for distinguished figures in culture and education.

== Key publications ==
=== French Romantic Travel Writing: Chateaubriand to Nerval (2011) ===
Nineteenth century French Romantic authors wrote many travel books. French Romantic Travel Writing: Chateaubriand to Nerval is the first study devoted to surveying the travelogues they produced and the reasons for, and significance of, this trend.

The book is cited 29 times in other published books and articles.

N. Christine Brookes (Professor of French in the Department of World Languages and Cultures at Central Michigan University) wrote that "Thompson’s remarkable work is a must read for experienced scholars and for those who seek a solid introduction to the field."

Peter Cogman in the Times Literary Supplement highlighted the book's "extensive bibliography" and described it as a "wide-ranging and rewarding exploration" of the genre's key works.

W. Edwards of Choice wrote: "It is difficult to imagine a more impressively researched volume. The author goes to great lengths to distinguish his analysis from previous studies on travel and writing ... Highly recommended."

=== Le Jeu de l’ordre et de la liberté dans La Chartreuse de Parme (1982) ===
This is a comprehensive study of Stendhal's masterpiece, La Chartreuse de Parme. The work was received as a significant contribution to Stendhalian studies, particularly for its nuanced structural and thematic analysis. The book was released as part of the Collection stendhalienne (No. 24), a prestigious, long-running scholarly book series published by Librairie Droz, and remains a referenced text for understanding the "Stendhalian" hero's relationship with society.

Michel Crouzet (a leading Stendhal Scholar) identifies Thompson’s work as a key reference for understanding the "detailing" of Stendhal's world.

Reviewers on Rakuten France describe it as an "excellent study" and "perhaps the best essay on Stendhal’s most beautiful novel".

The book remains a staple on university reading lists and is frequently cited in French literature concours (competitive exams) and scholarly journals.

=== L'Autre et le sacré: surréalisme, cinéma, ethnologie (1985) ===
This is a collection of texts, edited by Thompson, that explores the complex connections between surrealist art, ethnographic film practices (particularly those of Jean Rouch), and the broader field of anthropology.

Researchers have referred to this volume as a critical resource for understanding figures like Edgar Morin and Jean Rouch. It is praised for its exploration of the "cinéma de la cruauté" and its impact on how "the other" is represented in visual media.

Livres sur le Cinéma categorises the work as an essential study in sociology and experimental avant-garde cinema, highlighting its focus on how surrealism anticipated postmodern ethnology.

== Books ==
- Le jeu de l'ordre et de la liberté dans la Chartreuse de Parme (1982, reprinted 2011), Aran, Éditions du Grand-Chêne, 1982 ; Slatkine Reprints, 2011 ISBN 978-2051021760.
- L'Autre et le sacré : surréalisme, cinéma, ethnologie (1985), L'Harmattan ISBN 978-2738434258.
- Lamiel fille du feu : essai sur Stendhal et l'énergie (1997), L'Harmattan ISBN 978-2738451040.
- Walking and the French Romantics: Rousseau to Sand and Hugo: 13 (French Studies of the Eighteenth and Nineteenth Centuries) (2003), Peter Lang Publishing ISBN 978-0820468945.
- French Romantic Travel Writing : Chateaubriand to Nerval (2011), Oxford University Press ISBN 978-0199233540.
- Explorations stendhaliennes : d’Armance à la Fraternité des arts (2013), Hermann ISBN 978-2705687175.

== Co-edited publications ==
- Stendhal et l'Angeleterre (with K.G. McWatters) (1987), Liverpool University Press ISBN 978-0853230458.
- Stendhal, Écrits sur l'art sous l'Empire et la Restauration (with Elaine Williamson and Hélène de Jacquelot) (2026), Classiques-Garnier ISBN 978-2406130833.
