= Rabbinical College of America =

Chabad-Lubavitch yeshiva in Morristown, New Jersey

Coordinates: 40.8057°N 74.4989°W

- Type: Chabad Lubavitch Chasidic Yeshiva
- Established: 1956
- Religious affiliation: Jewish
- Academic affiliations: Association of Advanced Rabbinical and Talmudic Schools, Tomchei Temimim
- Location: Morris Township, New Jersey, U.S.
- Campus: Urban, 82-acre (330,000 m^{2})
- Website: www.rca.edu

The Rabbinical College of America is a yeshiva in Morris Township, New Jersey, affiliated with the Chabad movement of Hasidic Judaism. Licensed by the New Jersey Commission on Higher Education, the yeshiva grants a four-year bachelor's degree in religious studies and a master's degree program in religious education and is accredited by the Association of Advanced Rabbinical and Talmudic Schools. The yeshiva is the New Jersey headquarters of the Chabad movement.

Established in Newark, New Jersey, in 1956, the school moved in 1971 to a campus in Morris Township covering 82 acres (33 ha).

== Academic programs ==
- Yeshiva Tomchei Temimim – The international network of Chabad Yeshivas, intended for college-aged men (18–22). Hundreds of its graduates obtained ordination at advanced Rabbinical schools, and serve as Rabbis of Chabad House and community institutions around the world.
  - Rabbinical ordination program for Tomchei Temimin graduates on-site under the supervision of Rabbi Chaim Schapiro. The ordination degrees have been signed by former Chief Rabbis of Israel, Rabbi Mordechai Eliyahu and Yisroel Meir Lau.
- Yeshiva Tiferes Bachurim – One of the first programs worldwide for Ba'alei Teshuva founded in the summer of 1973 by Rabbi Avraham Lipskier, who served as its first Mashpia (and who subsequently founded Yeshiva Tiferes Menachem in Seagate, NY). This program is accredited by the state of New Jersey to grant a Bachelor's Degree in Religious Studies.
  - There was an ordination program instituted in 1978 with seven students under the supervision of Rabbis Dovid Wichnin, the first Rosh Yeshiva (Headmaster), and Boruch Yorkovitch. The examination committee consisted of Rabbi Sholom Ber Gordon from New Jersey, and Rabbis Avraham Osdoba and Bogomilsky from New York. However, it was phased out in 1979 due to low enrollment. The remaining four students (Rabbis Simcha Frankel, Tzvi Freeman, Shlomo Sawilowsky, Menachem Schmidt) continued their advanced ordination studies after graduation elsewhere. Many other graduates of Tiferes Bachurim subsequently received ordination at other rabbinical institutions. Examples are Rabbis Dovid Rothschild, author of a two volume series in English pertaining to the Lubavitcher Rebbe's holiday essays; and Herschel Finman, who has hosted a radio show (WLQV 1500 am and WPON 1460 am) since 1995. In 2009, the ordination program was reinstituted under the supervision of Rabbi Ya'akov Wagner.
  - Notable graduates include Rabbi Tzvi Freeman, Rabbi Moshe Reuven Sheradsky, Rabbi YY Jacobson, Dr. Dovid Lazerson, author of Skullcaps n' Switchblades, and Shimon Waronker.
- Kollel Tiferes Avreichim for married students.
- Cheder Lubavitch, an Orthodox day school for boys and girls, whose principal is Rabbi Aaron Wilschanski.
- Yeshiva Summer Program, is a summer program for 13- to 14-year-old boys that runs every summer. It includes half a day of learning and half a day of activities, and many trips.
- Albert Richman, an electrical engineering executive, was the president and was awarded an honorary doctorate in 1982.
