= Mustafa Babanli =

Azerbaijani scientist and academic

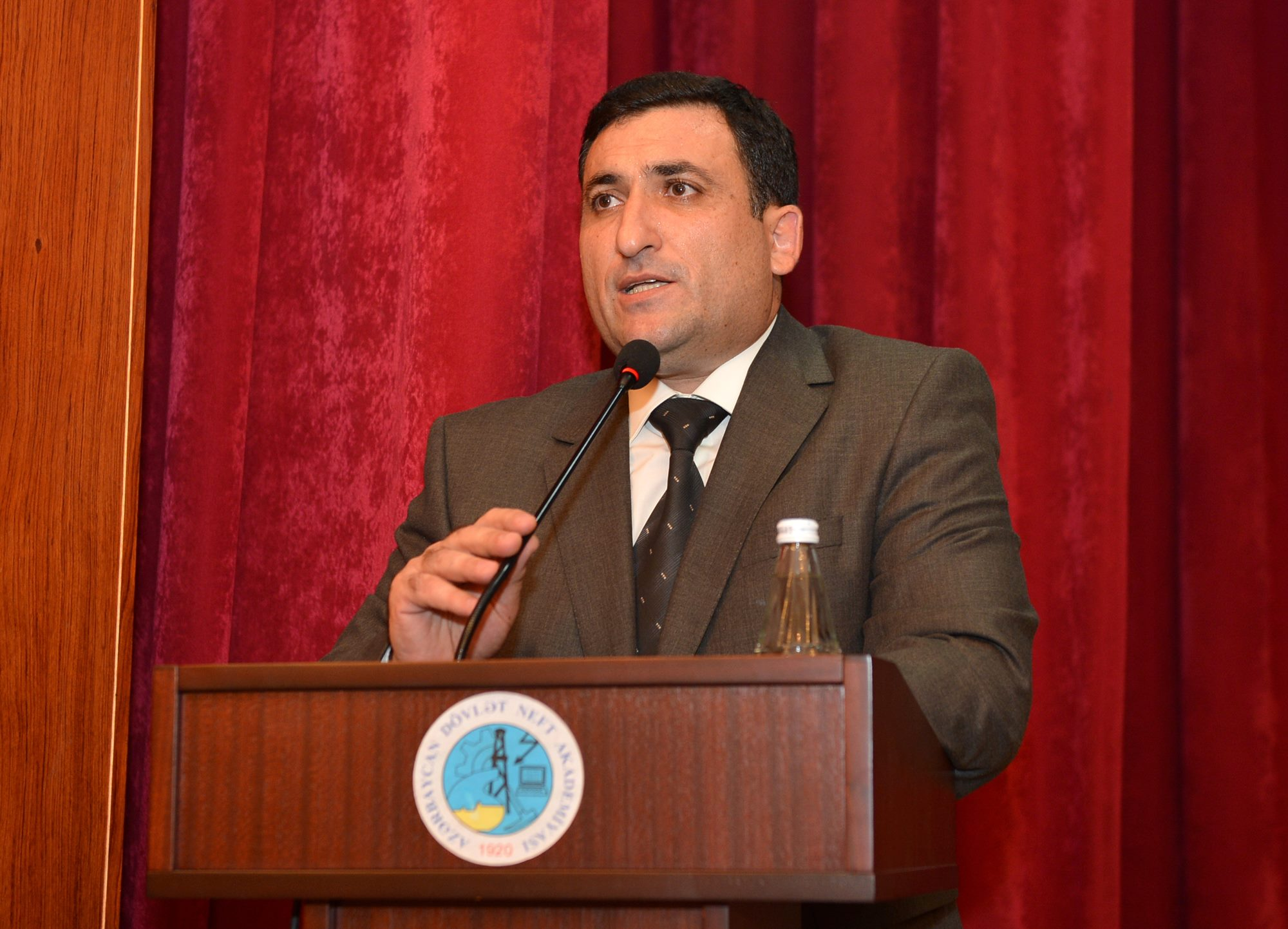
- Born: Mustafa Babanli; February 21, 1968 (age 58); Saatli, Azerbaijan SSR
- Education: Kyiv Polytechnic Institute
- Scientific career
- Fields: Physics, metallurgy, shape memory alloys
- Workplaces: Azerbaijan State Oil and Industry University

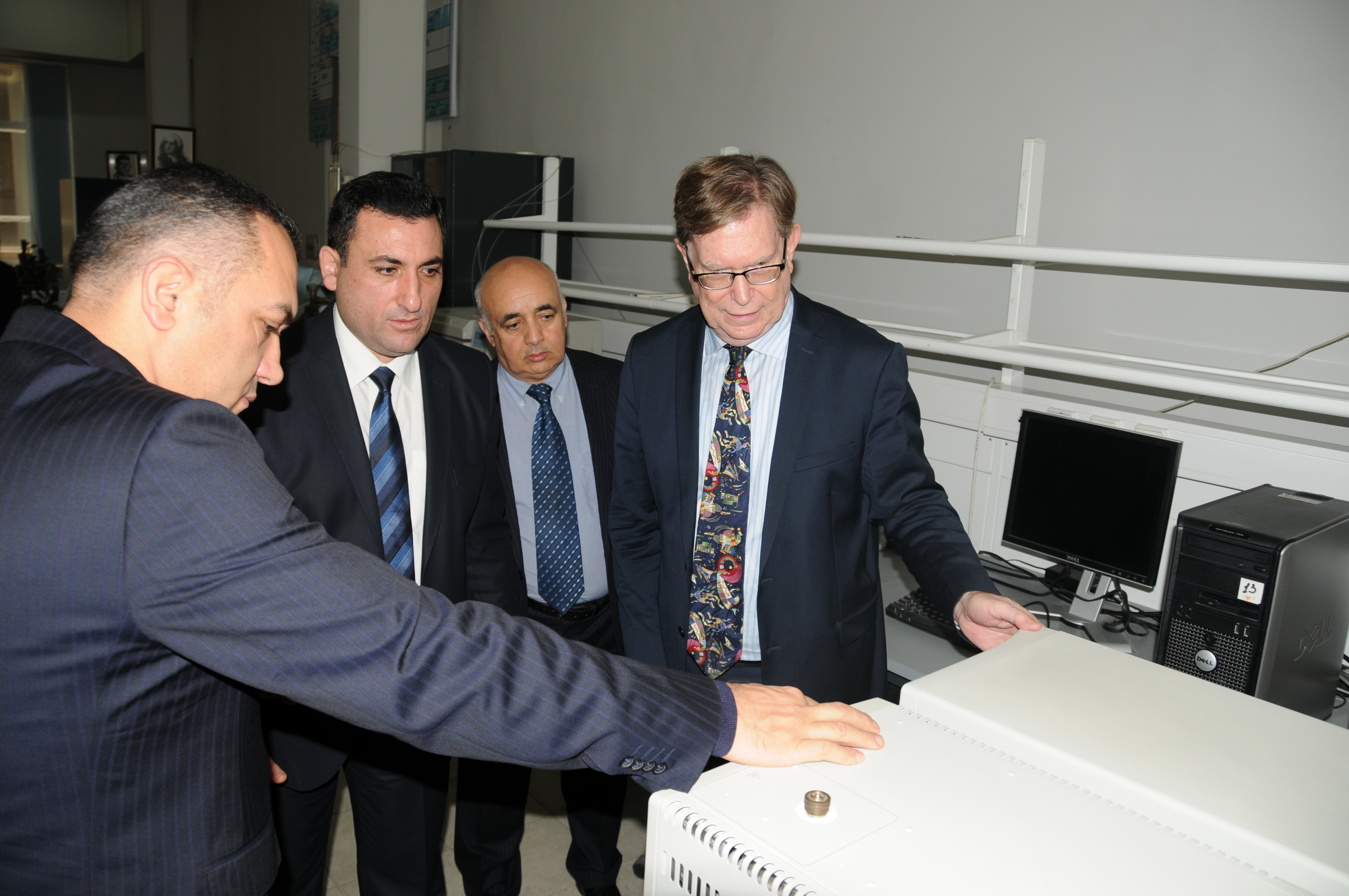
Mustafa Babanli hosts Nobel Prizewinner George Smoot at the Azerbaijan State University of Oil and Industry

Mustafa Babanlı (Azerbaijani: Mustafa Baba oğlu Babanlı; born February 21, 1968), is an Azerbaijani scientist, Rector of the Azerbaijan State Oil and Industry University.

On September 3, 2015, Mustafa Babanli was appointed Rector of the Azerbaijan State University of Oil and Industry. He is a member of the International Association of University Presidents, serving as Regional Chair for Middle East, Caucasus & Central Asia.

== See also ==
- Azerbaijan Technical University
- Kyiv Polytechnic Institute
