= Boston Soko =

Professor of Linguists and Literature

Boston Jaston Soko is a retired professor at Mzuzu University in the French section of the Faculty of Education's department of Languages and Literature. He has taught in several universities like the University of Malawi formerly Chancellor College on French language and literature. He has written for over four decades on African literature in French language as well as in English. Prof. Soko is also a former chairperson of the Ngoni cultural heritage association known as Mzimba Heritage Association. He coined the name for the Ngoni Cultural Festival which is called "uMthetho". The name was approved by the Executive and His Majesty Inkosi ya Makosi M'mbelwa IV in 2004. Professor Soko's work is much praised and appreciated for contributing to the promotion of the French language in the Republic of Malawi as well as promoting Malawian literature. He "has been very active in research in African Literatures, teaching the African novel of French expression, negritude poetry, and oral literature".

== Early life and education ==
Boston Soko was born at Loudon Mission (Embangweni) in Northern Region of the Republic of Malawi during the Second World War. He attended Loudon Primary School and was selected to Dedza Secondary School in January 1963, the only Federation of Rhodesia and Nyasaland Government Secondary School. In 1966 he obtained his Cambridge O-Level School Certificate. He was thereby selected to Chancellor College, a constituent college of the University of Malawi, in September 1967. He majored both in French and geography, obtaining a bachelor's degree in July 1971.

He obtained his second B.A. at the University of Besançon (France). He did his master's degree in African novel at Université de Paris XIII (Paris-Nord, 1977–1978), followed by a second master's degree (D.E.A) at Paris III (La Sorbonne Nouvelle) in France. He spent 1981 to 1984 at University of Paris III: Sorbonne Nouvelle (French: Université de la Sorbonne Nouvelle) in France also, focusing on a PhD in African oral literature.

== Career ==
Prof. Soko due to his passion of African literature, was knighted Chevalier dans l'Ordre des Palmes Académique in 1990 and in 2007 he was made an Officier dans l'Ordre Académiques by French government

Prof Soko has been teaching for 44 years (as of 2017). He also taught as an expatriate at University of Swaziland. He was External Examiner in the following universities: University of Nairobi, University of Dar es Salaam, University of Botswana, National University of Lesotho, University of KwaZulu-Natal (then University Durban Natal), and lately, University of Malawi. He retired from the University of Malawi in 2001.For the next seventeen years, he lectured at Mzuzu University and retired in 2017 at the age of 73.

== Personal life ==
Boston Soko is a Ngoni and speaks Chichewa, Tumbuka, English and French fluently. Soko is a vocal proponent for the revival of the Ngoni language as it is no longer a widely spoken language in Malawi. He has four daughters and three sons.

== Works ==
"Labour Migration in Vimbuza Songs", in Groenewald, HRC, University of Rand Afrikaans, Pretoria.

"Translating Oral Literature into European Languages", in Oral Tradition and Changing Vision of the World, Edited by RmA. Whitaker and E.R. Sienaert, University of Natal, Durban,1986.

"Social Criticism in African Oral Literature: The Case of Chitima Ndlovu's Song", in Oral Tradition and its Transmission, the many forms of Message." Edited by Edgard Sienaert, Meg Cowper-Lewis and Nigel Bell, The Campbell Collections and Centre for Oral Studies, University of Natal, Durban,1994, pp63-87.

"Traditional Forms of Instruction: The Case of the Jan do Initiation Ceremony", in Catching Winged Words, Oral Tradition and Education. Edited by Edgard Sienaert and Nigel Bell. University of Natal Oral Documentation and Research Centre, Durban,1988, pp63 146–161.

"Mon grand-Pete...", Valerie Dr portraits, in Conteurs, Cahiers Dr Litterature Orale No. 11. Publications Langes'O, Service de la Recherche INALCO, Edited by Genevieve Calame-Griaule, Paris,1982, pp 188–190.

"Communal Vimbuza Songs, Women Writing Africa (Eastern Region), Feminist Press, City University, New York, 2007, pp356-357.

Tumbuka Folktales, Moral and Didactic Lessons from Malawi, Mzuni Publications, Mzuzu, Malawi, 2010. (Book) Co-authored Boston Soko and Lester Brian Shaba.

"The Vestiges of Ngoni Oral Literature" in Southern African Journal for Folklore Studies, Vol.7, Department of African Languages, UNISA, Pretoria, 1996, pp59–67.

"The Kamchoma Traditional Dance or the Violation of the Moral Code", in Voices, A Journal for Oral Studies, University of Natal, Durban, 1999, pp105–119.

"Language and Oral Traditions in Malawi Ngoni", in Voices, A Journal for Oral Studies, Vol.2, The Centre for Oral Studies, University of Natal, Durban, 1999, pp120–141. Co-authored Boston Soko and Al Mtenje.

Orality and its Function and its Aesthetics: Orality as a Form of Critical Theory: The Notion of Emancipation in Tumbuka Folktales. Co-authored Boston Soko and Lester Brian Shaba. In Reading Malawian Literature: New Approaches and Theories. Mzuni Press, Mzuzu, 2013. (Book).

"Entertainment and Traditional Education in the Wake of the AIDS Pandemic in Malawi: A Study of Mzimba and Rumphi Districts", in "Knowledge and Action in the context of AIDS", Wissen und Wissenschaft in Afrika Universität Frankfurt am Main. 26 July 2006.

Anthony Nazombe: Teacher, Poet and Critic" in Journal of Humanities, No 19, University of Malawi, Zomba, 2005, pp63.106-113. Co-author Dale St Mthatiwa.
