= Mary Bonner =

Early Texas printmaker

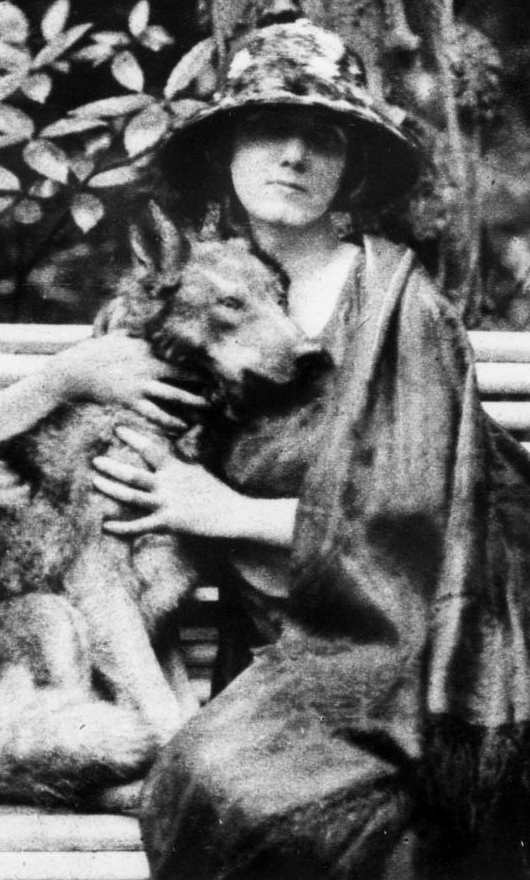
- Mary Bonner (and dog), from a 1924 publication
- Born: Mary Anita Bonner; March 31, 1887; Bastrop, Louisiana, U.S.
- Died: June 26, 1935 (aged 48); San Antonio, Texas, U.S.
- Other name: Polly Bonner
- Education: University of Texas, Stickney Memorial Art School

Mary Anita Bonner (March 31, 1887–June 26, 1935) was an American printmaker. She was an early artist from Texas, which was the subject of much of her work, and she received international recognition for her work.

== Biography ==
Bonner was born in March 31, 1887 in Bastrop, Louisiana to Samuel Lafayette and Carrie Ann (née Hill) Bonner. She was one of three children. Her mother moved the family to San Antonio, Texas in 1897.

Bonner was educated at the San Antonio Academy, and went on to attend the University of Texas from 1904 to 1906. She began studying art with Robert Jenkins Onderdonk and studied in Europe, beginning with school in Lausanne, Switzerland before Munich leading up to the First World War. The war forced her to return to the United States and she attended Stickney Memorial Art School in Pasadena until the war ended. Bonner joined the Woodstock Art Colony in New York in 1922. There she was inspired to study etching, specifically in France. She was offered instruction by Édouard Henri Léon and spent seven years living and studying between the United States and Paris.

Her work was exhibited from 1923 and began to attract the notice of art critics in France. She won several medals for her works. Initially she exhibited at the more conservative Salon des Artistes Français. However Bonner then began to exhibit in the more avant-garde Salon d'Automne. Bonner's work became well known when one of her pieces, Les Cowboys, was the central illustration of the media coverage of an exhibition in 1925. In 1929 Bonner was awarded the Palmes Academiques Officier d'Academie.

Bonner also became involved in art and conservation in her home in Texas and was very active locally until she died as a result of complications from a surgery on June 26, 1935. Her work was purchased to include in a permanent exhibition in the British Museum.
