= Shimon Waronker =

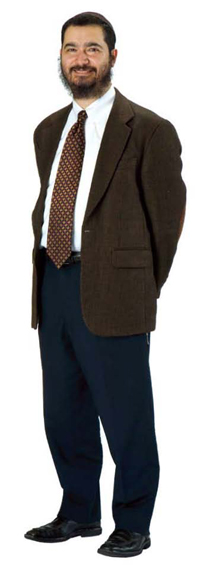
- Shimon Waronker

Shimon Waronker is the headmaster of The New American Academy, PS 770, a public school that opened in 2010 in Crown Heights, Brooklyn, New York. He modeled The New American Academy's approach to education after Phillips Exeter Academy's methods.

== Early life and education ==
Born Simón Bernardo Warren, Waronker was born to a non-Jewish Chilean mother and an American father. He grew up in Chile, Honduras, Uruguay and Guatemala. When Waronker was 11, his father died and his mother moved with Waronker and Waronker's two siblings to Rockville, Maryland. He graduated from the University of Maryland, College Park with a B.A. in 1990. He took the U.S. Military's basic course in military intelligence at Fort Huachuca, Arizona in 1991. Waronker graduated from the Rabbinical College of America in Morristown, New Jersey with a bachelor's degree in Rabbinical Studies in 1997. Waronker graduated from Touro College in New York City, New York with a master's degree in 2003. He graduated from the Harvard Graduate School of Education in Cambridge, Massachusetts in 2009 with a Master of Education degree.

Waronker converted to Judaism as an adult, and is a member of the Chabad-Lubavitch sect of Hasidic Judaism.

== Career ==
He is the former principal of the Jordan L. Mott School in the South Bronx, also known as Junior High School 22. He had success in taking the failing school in a tough neighborhood and turning it around. This drew attention because Waronker, a member of the Chabad-Lubavitch sect of Hasidic Judaism who wears a conservative suit, a beard, a black hat and a velvet yarmulke, had to overcome prejudice both in getting the job and in gaining the trust of the parents, teacher and students at the school. Waronker, a former intelligence officer in the United States Army, took over a school listed as one of the 12 most violent in New York. There were active gangs, attacks and fights that led to hospitalizations, drug use and alcohol on campus.

Waronker's methods included expelling and suspending large numbers of students, adding guidance counselors, a psychologist, social workers, and family workers to the staff and finding ways for more teachers to attend advanced educational seminars. Students got one-on-one or small group tutoring one to three times a week. There were frequent field trips and the school had books in every classroom, a new library, new science labs, and laptop computer carts. The school was divided into eight small academies, so that small groups of teachers could focus on small groups of students.

Waronker was awarded the French Ordre des Palmes Académiques on October 20, 2009, and was knighted by French Ambassador Pierre Vimont at the Tweed Courthouse, headquarters of the New York City Department of Education.

In the fall of 2010, Waronker opened a new public school, The New American Academy, in Crown Heights, Brooklyn, New York.

On March 22, 2011, Waronker was recognized by the New York State Senate for his receipt of the Elementary School Principal of the Year Award from the Association of Orthodox Jewish Teachers with "Resolution J902-2011". 2 October 2015.

In 2019, Waronker assumed leadership of the Yeshiva Beth Rivkah Ladies College in Australia. After travelling to the U.S. from Australia in 2020 for his daughter's wedding, Waronker was forced to leave this position because COVID-19 travel restrictions prevented him from returning to Australia.

== Honors and awards ==
- Recipient of the Association of Orthodox Jewish Teachers' Elementary School Principal of the Year Award on March 27, 2011

== Personal life ==
Waronker lives in Crown Heights, Brooklyn, New York with his six children, Shoshana, Yaakov, Tzvia, Tamar, Leah, and Baruch and his wife Malka.
