= Y. K. Sohoni =

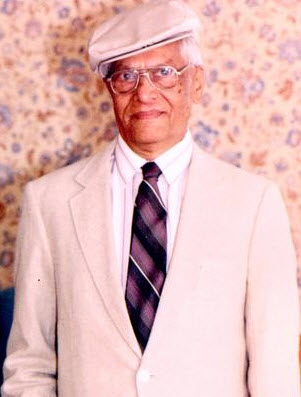
Prof. Y.K. Sohoni in 1995.

Y. K. Sohoni (1911–2003) was a teacher and professor of French for over fifty years. He was based in Pune and Bombay for most of his life, till he migrated to the United States of America in 1984. In 1953, he started the Indian Association of Teachers of French. He was instrumental in setting up several departments and institutes for the teaching and learning of French in India, and was the first Head of the Department of Modern European Languages at the University of Pune, Among other awards, in 1975 he was awarded the Chevalier dans l'Ordre Palmes Académiques by the Government of France "pour services rendus a la culture française." It was in the same year that he established the Department of French in CIEFL, Hyderabad. From 1984, he lived in Great Falls, Virginia till his death in 2003.

== Education and teaching career ==
Yeshwant Kashinath Sohoni was born in a Chitpavan Brahmin family in Pune, and went to the M.E. Society's Boys' School (Perugate Bhave school) in Pune. He attended S.P. College (then under the University of Bombay), from where he received a Bachelor of Science in Mathematics and Physics (18 August 1936), and also a Bachelor of Arts (15 February 1938). During this period around 1936-37, he taught French at the Nutan Marathi Vidyalaya High School, Pune, and at the M.E. Society's High School (now called the Vimalabai Garware High School) at Deccan Gymkhana, Pune. Y.K. Sohoni then left for Paris, where he was registered at the Faculté des Lettres de l'Université de Paris in 1938-39, and received a Diplôme d'études de civilisation française in 1939. After his return to India, he taught French at the Bombay Scottish Orphanage Society's High School at Mahim, Bombay, from 1940-44. He left Bombay to teach French at Fergusson College, Pune, from 1944 to 1958, where he was the Head of the Department. During this period, he also taught evening classes at the Ranade Institute. He was the promoter and first Secretary of the Indian Association of Teachers of French. In 1958, he was appointed as a lecturer in French at the University of Pune (then known as the University of Poona), and within a few years was promoted as a reader, then professor, and finally the Head of the Department of Modern European Languages. He retired from the University of Pune in 1973. He established the Department of French in CIEFL, Hyderabad in 1975. In recognition of his services to French culture, the Government of France awarded him with the title of Chevalier dans l'Ordre Palmes Académiques. Till 1976, he was the Correspondent for India for Le Français dans le Monde and of the Federation Internationale des Etudes Français.

== Personal life ==
Prof. Y.K. Sohoni had two brothers, Krishna and Vijay, and two sisters, Lila and Kamala. He was married to Sushila Sohoni (née Bapat) in 1937 till her death in 2000. He is survived by three children, Shrikant Sohoni (retd. Reader, EMRC Pune), married to Shobhana Sohoni née Joshi (retd. Professor of Biochemistry, B.J. Medical College), Mangala Joshi (married to Brig. S.P. Joshi) and Aparna Karmarkar (married to the late Subhash Karmarkar who worked at the U.S. Naval Weapons Center in Bethesda), and five grandchildren. His grandson, Pushkar Sohoni, teaches at the Indian Institute of Science Education and Research, Pune.

== Bibliography ==
- "Letters from Paris" (Newsletters in Marathi, Kesari, Pune, 1938)
- "Dictation in French Schools" (Article in English, The Progress of Education, Pune, 1940)
- "Education in France" (Article in Marathi, Rohini Magazine, Pune, April 1948)
- "The Doctor in Moliere's Plays" (Article in Marathi, Navabharat Magazine, Pune 1949)
- Suras French Katha (A collection of French Short Stories translated into Marathi, Pune: Dhamdhere Prakashan, 1950)
- "Three unique features of Spain" (Article in Marathi, Sahyadri, December 1952)
- "Grow more…" (Compilation of short humorous stories, Vangamaya Shobha, June 1954)
- "A Foreign Language Teacher's Problems" (Article in English, The Progress of Education, Pune, July 1954)
- "Eventually he had to concede defeat" (Translation of a French story into Marathi, Chitramayajagat, October 1954)
- "The rise of a great artist" (Translation of a French story into Marathi, Manohar, Pune, January 1955)
- "Echanges culturels" (Article in French, Le Trait-d'Union, Pondicherry, February 1956)
- "A New Approach to Elementary French" (Article in English, The Progress of Education, Pune, October 1956)
- "What is a Lycee Pilote?" (Article in English, The Progress of Education, Pune 1956)
- "L'Enseignement du français dans l'Etat de Bombay" (Article in French, Cahiers Pedagogiques, Lyon, France, May 1957)
- "Strike while the iron is hot" (Article in English on the psychology of a polyglot, The Progress of Education, Pune, 1957)
- "Learning a New Language" (Article in English, The Education Quarterly, Ministry of Education, New Delhi, September 1958)
- "Comment j'enseigne la littérature francaise" (Article in French, L'Enseignement du francais auz etrangers, Alliance Française de Paris, November 1958)
- "You too can learn French" (Article in Marathi, Manohar, Pune, January 1959)
- "Experimental Schools in France" (Article in English, The Orissa Education Magazine, Vol III, March 1959)
- "French Drama in the Twentieth Century" (Article in Marathi, Sakal, Pune)
- "A propos de la traduction" (Article in French, L'Enseignement du francais auz etrangers, Alliance Française de Paris, March 1961)
- "Compréhension visuelle sans expression orale" (Article in French, Le francais dans le monde, Paris, September 1962)
- "Can Modern Languages be Properly Learned if Classical Languages are Discarded?" (Paper in English, Acta, International Congress of the Federation internationale des langues et des litteratures modernes, New York, August 1963)
- "Contact avec la France et le français" (Article in French, Le Trait-d'Union, Pondicherry, July 1965)
- "A propos des textes prescrits" (Article in French, Le Trait-d'Union, Pondicherry, October 1965)
- Dix Contes (Ten French Short Stories selected and annotated in collaboration with Monsieur H.Fuseillier, (Bombay: Bombay University Publication, 1965)).
- Petits Récits de Grands Ecrivains (Prose extracts selected and annotated in collaboration with Monsieur G.A.Deleury, (Bombay: Bombay University Publication, 1966)).
- Vocabulaire d'initiation aux études agronomiques (Results of research done at Poona University with a grant from Centre de Recherches, d'Etudes de Documentation et d'Information sur la Femme, France, Institut Agronomique, Paris, and Poona university, Pune, (Paris: Didier, 1966))
- Selections from French Poetry (Poems selected and annotated in collaboration with three teachers of French, (Pune: Maharashtra State Board of Secondary Education, April 1970))
- "Explication de texte" (Paper in French, Gem, Karnatak University Vol III, Dharwar, 1970)
- "L'enseignement du français dans les universités indiennes" (Paper in French, Acta, First International Meeting of Departments of French, Laval university, Quebec, Canada, May 1972)
- "Place and Importance of Translation in our Foreign Language Courses" (Article in English, The Education Quarterly, Ministry of Education, New-Delhi, January 1974)
- "A few thoughts on the study of French Literature in our Indian Universities" (Article in English, Newsletter No.15, 1975. The Central Institute of English and Foreign Languages, Hyderabad)
- "The teaching of French in India with suggestions for its Improvement" (Article in English, Newsletter No.20, March 1976, The Central Institute of English and Foreign Languages, Hyderabad)
- "Aspect in French" (Article in English, Newsletter No.24, The Central Institute of English and Foreign Languages, Hyderabad)
- "Influence des écrivains français sur les écrivains marathes" (Paper read at Winter Institute, JNU, N.Delhi, 1983)
- "The teaching of French in India: Past and Present" (Article in English, published in Scientific and Humanistic Dimensions of Language: Festschrift for Robert Lado, John Benjamin Publishing Company, Amsterdam/Philadelphia, 1985)
- "Amchyawar ajach prem kara" (Poem in Marathi, July 1989, Ekata Quarterly, Toronto, Canada)
- "Jaudya mala dewaghari" and "Kiti Bhagyawan mi!" (Poems in Marathi, Oonmesh, Poetry Collection published on the occasion of the 5th BMM CONVENTION, held at L.A., California, June 1991)
- "Nostalgie" (Article in French, published in Essais of The Central Institute of English and Foreign Languages, Hyderabad, Hyderabad, 1994)
- "Les problèmes d'une personne âgée" (Article in French, published in Le Trait-d'Union, Pondicherry, August 1995)
- "Sacrements" (Article in French, published in Le Trait-d'Union, Pondicherry, August 1996)
- "Souvenir de mon premier voyage en France" (Article in French, published in Le Trait-d'Union, Pondicherry, December 1997)
