= Leo Benardo =

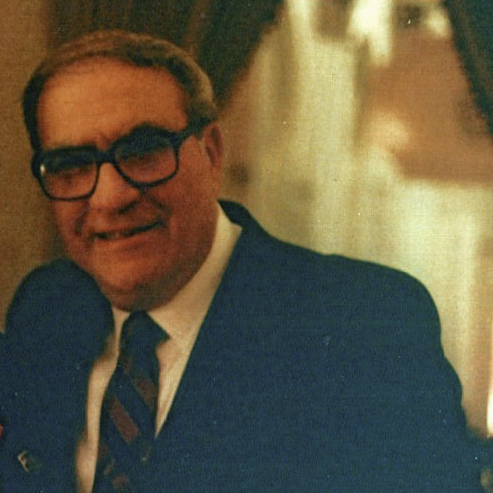
- Born: March 13, 1928; Bronx, New York
- Died: July 31, 2016 (aged 88); Bronx, New York
- Occupation: educator ∙ author

Leo Benardo (March 13, 1928 – July 31, 2016) was a foreign language educator and the second president of the American Council on the Teaching of Foreign Languages.

== Early life and education ==
Benardo was born and raised in the Bronx, NY. He was a 1944 graduate of William Howard Taft High School at the age of 15. He matriculated at the City College of New York where he was Phi Beta Kappa in his junior year and graduated in 1947.

== Career ==
Benardo was Director of Foreign Languages for the New York City School System from 1966 to 1987 and supervised some 1,300 foreign language teachers.

In 1966 and 1967, Benardo wrote and appeared in 30 television programs televised weekly — first on WPIX Channel 11 and later on the New York City Board of Education outlet in programs entitled Methods of Teaching Foreign Languages. These programs are kinescoped and stored.

Benardo co-authored English: Your New Language, a textbook series for non-native English students published in 1967 by Silver Burdett.

Benardo served as the second president of the American Council on the Teaching of Foreign Languages (ACTFL) in 1969. He was actively involved in the early organizational process of ACTFL. The ACTFL Leo Benardo Award for Innovation in K-12 Language Education was established in 2014 and is granted annually.

Benardo was President of Phi Beta Kappa, Gamma Chapter at the City College of New York in 1989.

Benardo was President of New York Academy of Public Education from 1990 to 1992.

For 27 years, Benardo taught Spanish, French, and Comparative Literature at Baruch College until 2014.

== Honors and awards ==
- Chevalier de l'Ordre des palmes académiques, 1974
- Nelson H. Brooks award from the Northeast Conference, 1988

The Leo Benardo Memorial Scholarship award is given annually to a City College of New York undergraduate student in the humanities who exemplifies the values and achievements which were hallmarks of Leo's college experience.
