= Vazeh Asgarov =

Azerbaijani academic

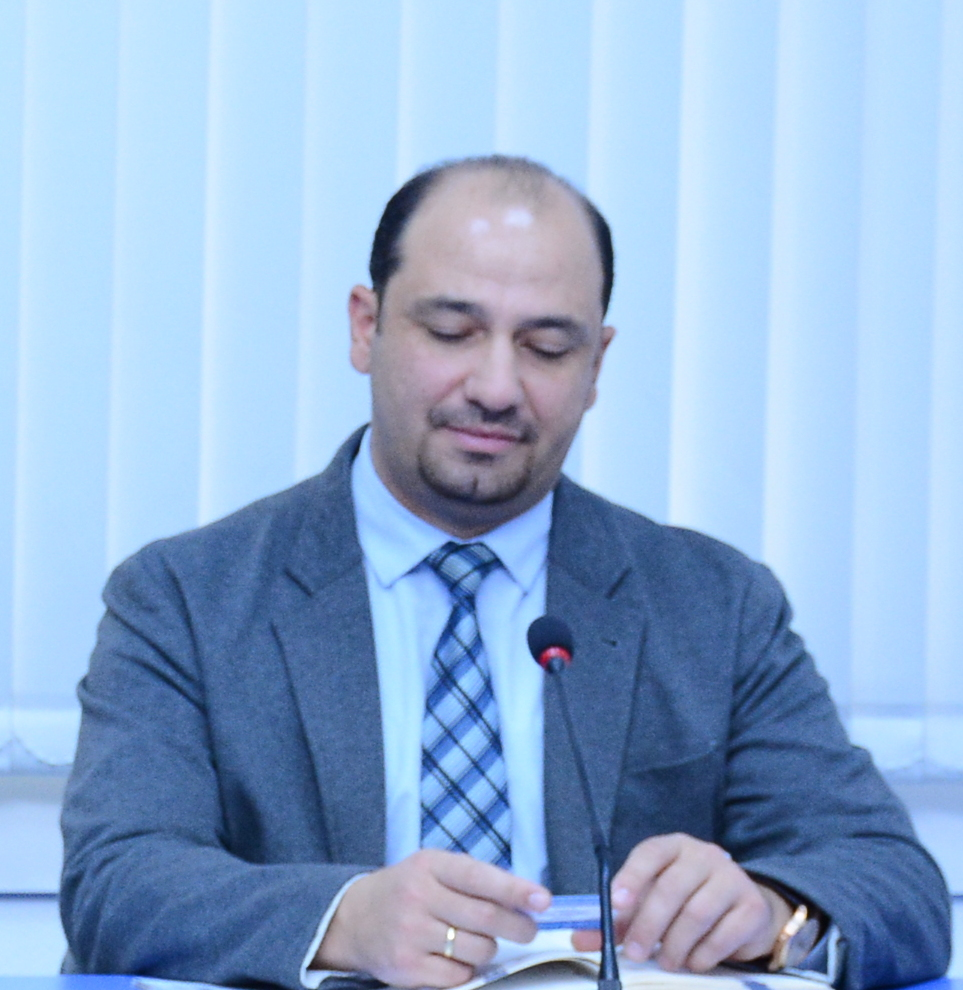
- Asgarov in 2017
- Born: October 15, 1978 (age 47); Baku, Azerbaijan SSR
- Citizenship: Azerbaijan
- Education: Azerbaijan University of Languages; University of Robert Schuman; University of Strasbourg; University of Marc Bloch

Vazeh Asgarov (Azerbaijani: Vаzеh Еldəniz оğlu Əskərоv) (born 15 October 1978) earned the degree of doctor at the University of Strasbourg (2012), the executive director at French-Azerbaijani University (UFAZ) (from 2016) and Rector of the Azerbaijan State Oil and Industry University (from 2023).

== Early life ==
Vazeh Asgarov was born on 15 October 1978, in Baku. From 1985 to 1995 he studied in secondary school. In 1999-2000 he served in the Armed Forces of Azerbaijan. He is married with two children.

=== Education ===
From 1995 to 1999 he studied at the Azerbaijan University of Languages at the faculty of French-English languages (bachelor). In 2003-2004 he received a certificate in international and European law, in 2003 he entered the Robert Schuman University in France and in 2004-2006 continued his Master's 1-degree education in linguistics at the University of Marc Bloch, also known as the University of Strasbourg.

In 2006-2007 continued his Master's 2-degree education in linguistics at the University of Marc Bloch.

In 2007–2012, having studied at the department of "Society and Culture in Europe" at the University of Strasbourg, he received his doctorate in 2012 with the topic “Appeal of Azerbaijanis to France: history and prospects”.

The doctoral diploma of the University of Strasbourg was recognized/nostrified by the High Attestation Commission under the President of the Republic of Azerbaijan in February 2016 and this event is known as the recertification of the first French doctoral degree in Azerbaijan. On February 18, 2019, by decree of the Higher Attestation Commission under the President of the Republic of Azerbaijan, Vazeh Asgarov received the diploma of Associate Professor and Doctor of Philosophy.

== Professional career ==
While studying at the university in the third and fourth years, he worked under a contract at the French Embassy in Azerbaijan, and after graduating from the university he worked as deputy director of the George Sand Cultural Center, operating under the French Embassy in Azerbaijan (2000–2001).

From 2001 to 2003 he worked as a translator-manager in various international and local organizations (Az-Media, SGS-Société Generale de Surveillance Azeri Ltd., Caspian Fish Co. Azerbaijan). In early 2013, after returning to Azerbaijan, Vazeh Asgarov was head of the Association of Young Researchers at the Azerbaijan University of Languages, and in May 2013 was appointed advisor to the rector.

From June 2014 to December 2015, he served as Acting Vice-Rector of Education Affairs at the Azerbaijan University of Languages, and during this period he served as acting rector several times. From December 2015 to December 2016 he again worked as an advisor to the rector. In December 2016, he was appointed Director of the French-Azerbaijan University (UFAZ). Vazeh Asgarov was elected associate professor of the French language department in May 2016 by the decision of the Academic Council of the Azerbaijan University of Languages. In December 2016, he was appointed executive director of the French-Azerbaijan University (UFAZ) and is acting director of the university until the present. On September 3, 2015, Asgarov was appointed Rector of the Azerbaijan State University of Oil and Industry.

== Public life ==
During his 10 years stay in France (2003–2013), Vazeh Asgarov was engaged in public activities, in 2005 he was elected chairman of the Association of Azerbaijani Students in France (ASEAF / FATA) and in the same year he became a co-founder and a member of the board of directors of the “Strasbourg House of Azerbaijan”. He put a lot of effort into the acquaintance of the French public with Azerbaijan. Since the creation of the organization, dozens of bulletins (AZER-INFO) and a book about the realities of Karabakh were published and brought to the attention of Europeans. Moreover, important Azerbaijani cultural events were also held.

In 2014, the French publishing house "Presses Academiques Francophones" (PAF) published the monograph written by Vazeh Asgarov "L'immigration des Azerbaïdjanais", and in 2016 the same publishing house published the textbook "Gerondif, Participe present, Adjectif verbal". The author of about 20 scientific articles, Vazeh Asgarov was the editor of 6 books published in French, participated in several international conferences, and about 50 of his articles and interviews on the socio-political topic were published.

== Awards ==
- In 2020, on January 8, Vazeh Asgarov was awarded the “Academic Palme” order by the French Ministry of National Education and Youth.
- On November 11, 2020, Vazeh Asgarov received the “French Souvenirs” order and diploma of merit.
- On December 30, 2020, he received the Honorary decree of the Ministry of Education of the Republic of Azerbaijan on the occasion of the 100th anniversary of the National University of Petroleum and Industry of Azerbaijan (ASOIU) and for its services in the development of education, scientific and educational activities effective to train highly qualified professionals.
- On December 2, 2021, Officer Ordre des Palmes académiques
