= Wendy Ayres-Bennett =

British linguist

Academic background
- Education: Girton College (BA, MA); University of Oxford (D.Phil.)
- Thesis: Vaugelas and the development of the French language: theory and practice (1983)

Academic work
- Discipline: Linguist
- Institutions: Murray Edwards College; University of Cambridge

Wendy Ayres-Bennett is a British linguist, Professor of French Philology and Linguistics at the University of Cambridge, England, and Professorial Fellow in Linguistics at Murray Edwards College.

She has a BA and MA in modern languages (French and German) from Girton College and a D.Phil. from the University of Oxford. Her doctoral thesis was "Vaugelas and the development of the French language: theory and practice". After her doctorate she spent a year as a junior research fellow at St Hilda's College, Oxford and was appointed as an assistant lecturer (1983–1988), then lecturer (1988–1998) and reader (1998–2005), in the French Department at Cambridge. She became a Fellow of Murray Edwards College (formerly New Hall) in 2001, and was appointed professor of French philology and linguistics in 2005. In 2009 she joined the Department of Theoretical and Applied Linguistics.

Her main research interests are the history of the French language and the history of linguistic thought. Her research interests include standardisation and codification, linguistic ideology and policy, variation and change. She is principal investigator on the multi-disciplinary multi-institution MEITS project: Multilingualism: Empowering Individuals, Transforming Societies., funded by the AHRC under its Open World Research Initiative (2016–2020). The project is working closely with policymakers and practitioners to promote the value of languages for key issues of our time and the benefits of language learning for individuals and societies.

In 2004 she was appointed as Officier dans l’Ordre des Palmes Académiques. The Académie française awarded her a Prix d’Académie in 1997 for her "Remarques de l’Académie française sur le Quinte-Curce de Vaugelas" and a silver medal of the Prix Georges Dumézil in 2013 for "Remarques et observations sur la langue française. Histoire et évolution d’un genre". In 2026 she was elected as a Member of the Academia Europaea.

== Selected publications ==
- Vaugelas and the Development of the French Language (1987, MHRA: ISBN 0947623132)
- A History of the French Language through Texts (1996, Routledge: ISBN 0415100003)
- Les Remarques de l’Académie Française sur le Quinte-Curce de Vaugelas 1719–1720: contribution à une histoire de la norme grammaticale & rhétorique en France (1996, co-authored with Philippe Caron; Presses de l’Ecole normale supérieure: ISBN 272880219X)
- Interpreting the History of French. A Festschrift for Peter Rickard on the occasion of his eightieth birthday (2002, co-edited with Rodney Sampson Rodopi: ISBN 9789042015807)
- Problems and Perspectives: Studies in the Modern French Language (2000, co-authored with Janice Carruthers, Longman Linguistics Library: ISBN 0582293456)
- Sociolinguistic Variation in Seventeenth-century France: Methodology and Case Studies (2004, Cambridge UP: ISBN 052182088X)
- The French Language and Questions of Identity (2007, co-edited with Mari C. Jones, Legenda: ISBN 9781904350682)
- Remarques et observations sur la langue française : histoire et évolution d’un genre (2011, co-authored with Magali Seijido; Éditions Classiques Garnie: ISBN 9782812403439)
- Bon Usage et variation sociolinguistique: Perspectives diachroniques et traditions nationales, (2013, Co-edited with Magali Seijido: ENS Éditions: ISBN 9782847883893)
- L’Histoire du français : État des lieux et perspectives (2014, co-edited with Thomas Rainsford; Éditions Classiques Garnier: ISBN 9782812429859)
- Manual of Romance Sociolinguistics (2018, co-edited with Janice Carruthers, Berlin/Boston: Walter de Gruyter: ISBN 9783110365955)
- Claude Favre de Vaugelas, Remarques sur la langue française (2018), Paris: Editions Classiques Garnier: ISBN 9782406078937)
