= Glynnis Cropp =

New Zealand medieval French scholar

Glynnis Cropp ONZM
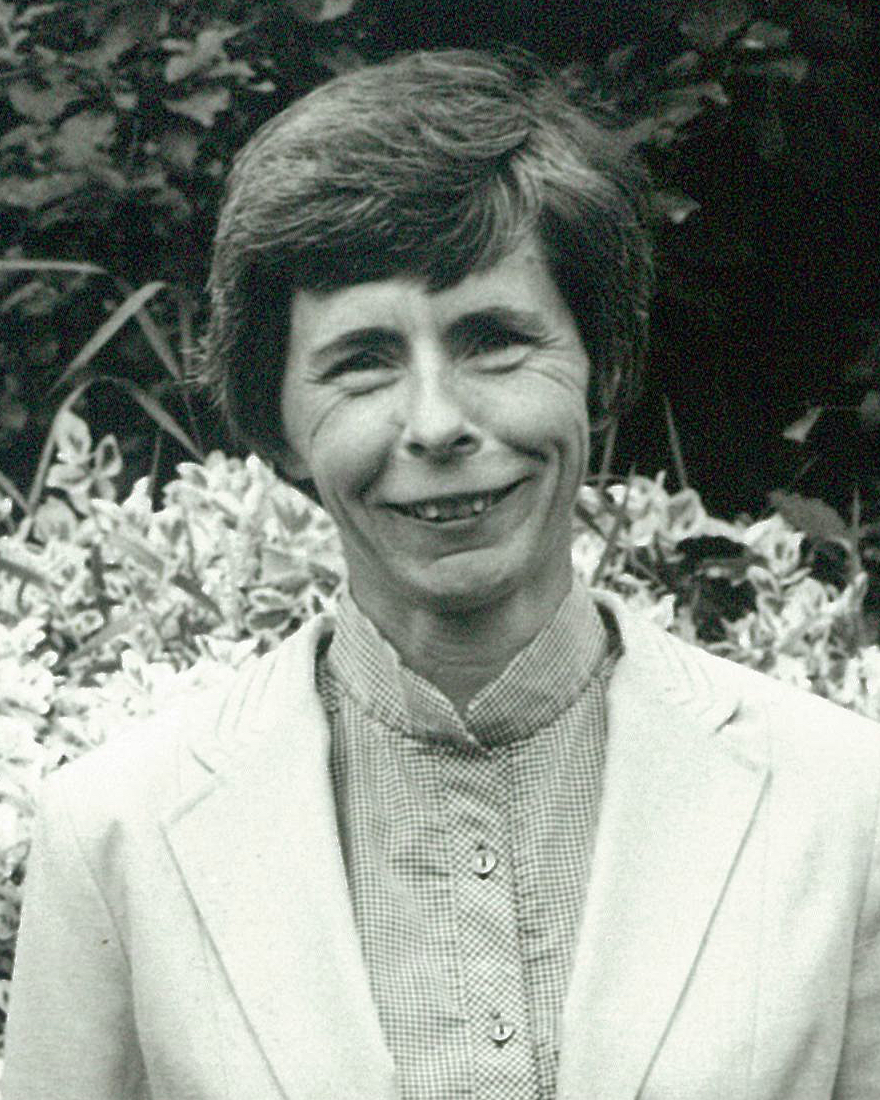
- Cropp in 1984
- Born: Glynnis Marjory Cropp; 23 March 1938 (age 88); Christchurch, New Zealand

Academic background
- Education: University of Canterbury; Paris 1 Panthéon-Sorbonne University

Academic work
- Discipline: Medieval French literature
- Institutions: Massey University
- Doctoral students: Cynthia White

Glynnis Marjory Cropp ONZM (born 23 March 1938) is a New Zealand scholar of French, and was a full professor at Massey University, specialising in medieval French manuscripts. In 2012, she was appointed an Officier of the Ordre des Palmes académiques, for lifetime achievement in French education. She was appointed an Officer of the New Zealand Order of Merit in 2013, for services to research in the humanities.

== Academic career ==
Cropp attended Christchurch Girl's High School, and then completed a Bachelor of Arts at the University of Canterbury in 1959, which she followed with a Master of Arts with First Class Honours in French in 1960. Cropp received a postgraduate scholarship to study at the University of Paris Sorbonne, where she earned a Licence es Lettres.

Cropp then joined the faculty of Massey University in 1963, and was promoted to associate professor in 1970. In the meantime, she completed a PhD at the University of Paris. Cropp was promoted to full professor at Massey in 1985, when she was also appointed head of the department of modern languages. She was Dean of the Faculty of Humanities of Massey University from 1987 to 1997.

In 2013, Cropp celebrated fifty years of teaching at Massey. Although she officially retired in 2001, she continued teaching until 2010, and to research after that. Her colleagues published a volume of essays, L'Offrande du Coeur: Medieval and early modern studies in honour of Glynnis Cropp, to mark her retirement.

== Honours and awards ==
In 2012, Cropp was appointed Officier of the Ordre des Palmes académiques for "lifetime achievement in French education". In the 2013 New Year Honours, she was appointed an Officer of the New Zealand Order of Merit, for services to research in the humanities.
