= List of Banaras Hindu University people =

The list of Banaras Hindu University people includes notable graduates, professors and administrators affiliated with Banaras Hindu University in Varanasi. For a list of Vice-Chancellors, see List of Vice-Chancellors of Banaras Hindu University.

== Nobel laureates ==
- C. V. Raman, the Nobel Prize winner in Physics in 1930 and Bharat Ratna laureate in 1954 (permanent visiting professor at BHU)

== Heads of state and government ==
- A.P.J. Abdul Kalam, 11th President of India, 2002–2007;Bharat Ratna laureate in 1997 (visiting professor, taught technology at BHU)
- Bishweshwar Prasad Koirala (B.A. 1934), former Prime Minister of Nepal
- Krishan Kant (M.Sc.), former Vice President of India
- Sarvepalli Radhakrishnan, first Vice President of India, 1952–1962; second President of India, 1962–1967; Bharat Ratna laureate in 1954 (the Vice Chancellor of BHU from 17 September 1939 to 16 January 1948)
- Sushila Karki (MA Political Science 1975) former interim Prime Minister of Nepal, former Chief Justice of the Supreme Court of Nepal.

== Notable alumni ==
=== Arts, humanities and social sciences ===
Famous alumni in arts, humanities, and social sciences

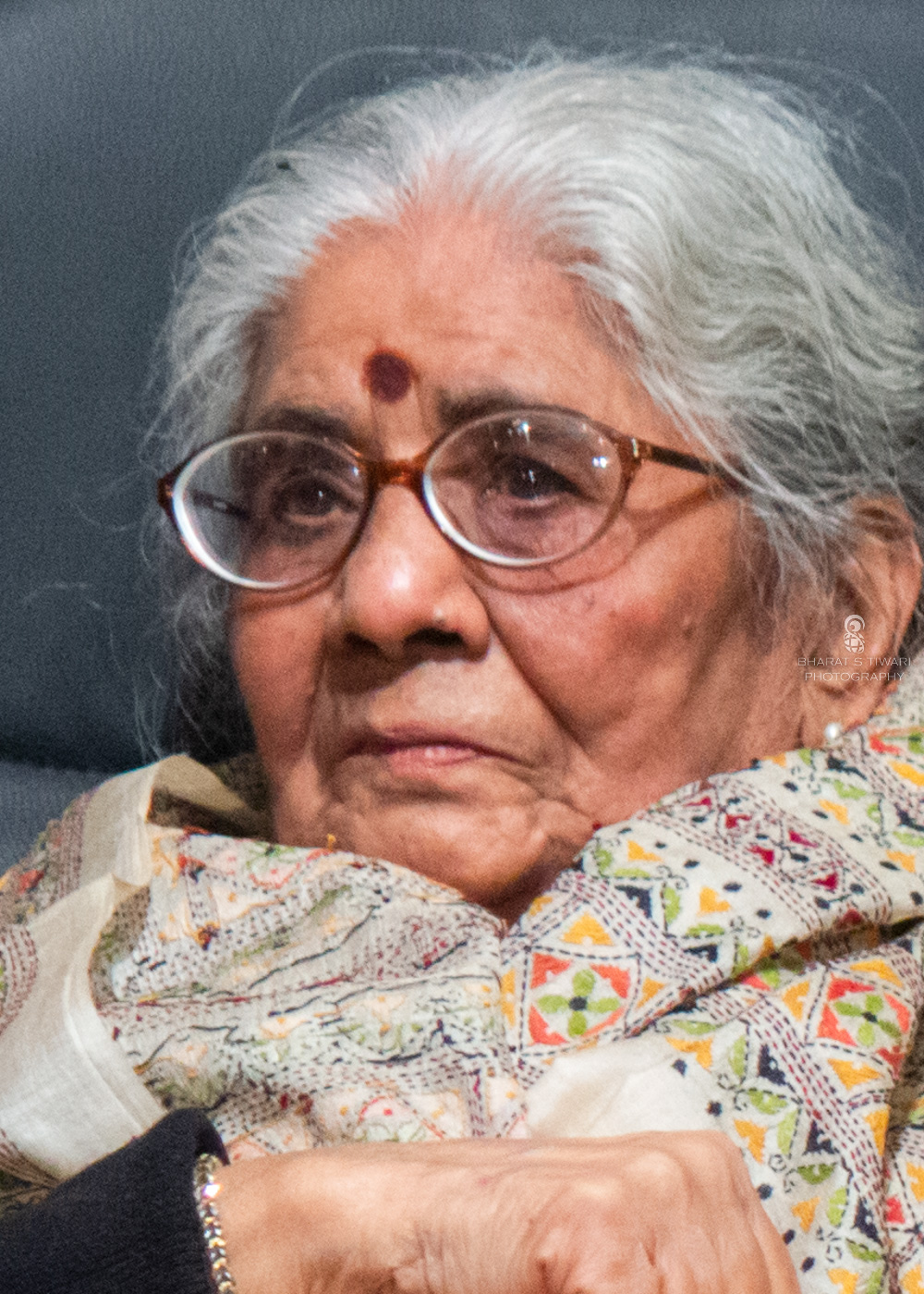
Mannu Bhandari

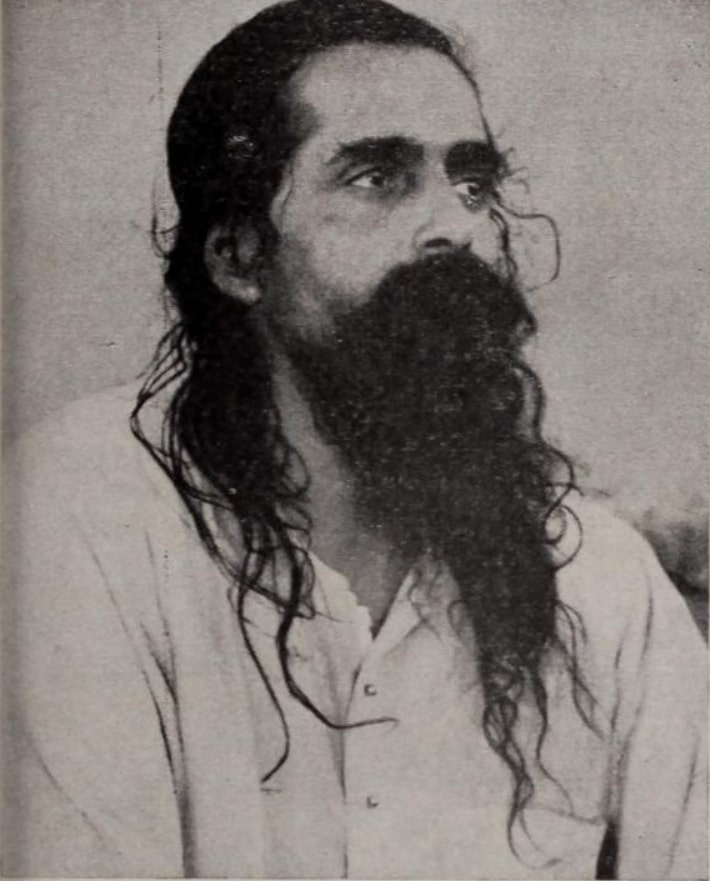
M. S. Golwalkar

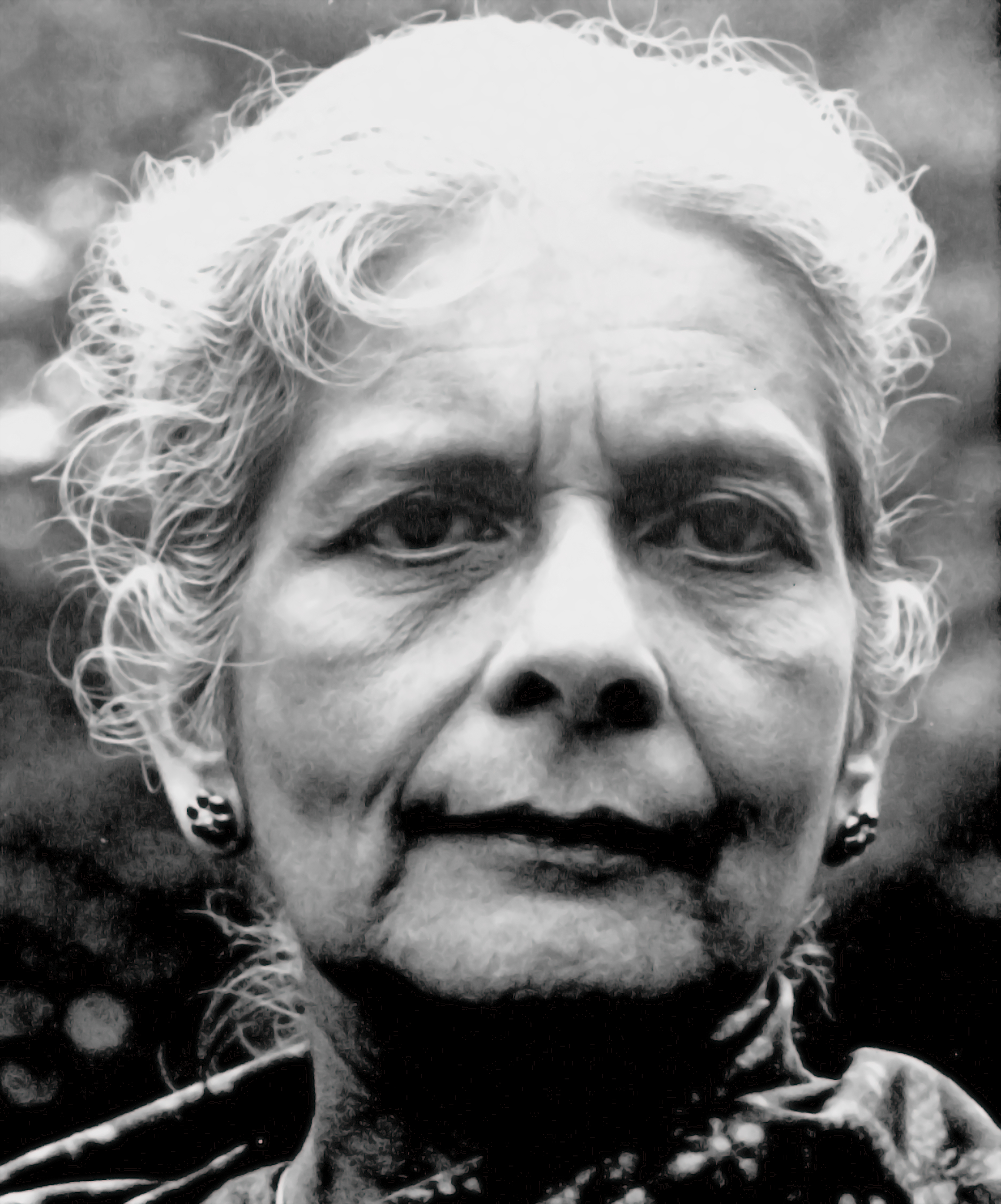
Radha Burnier

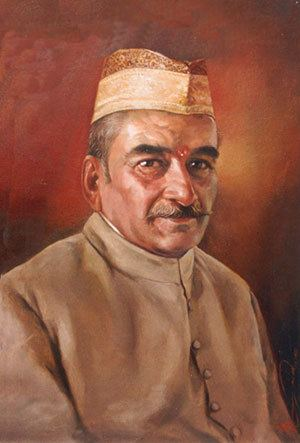
Vibhuti Narayan Singh

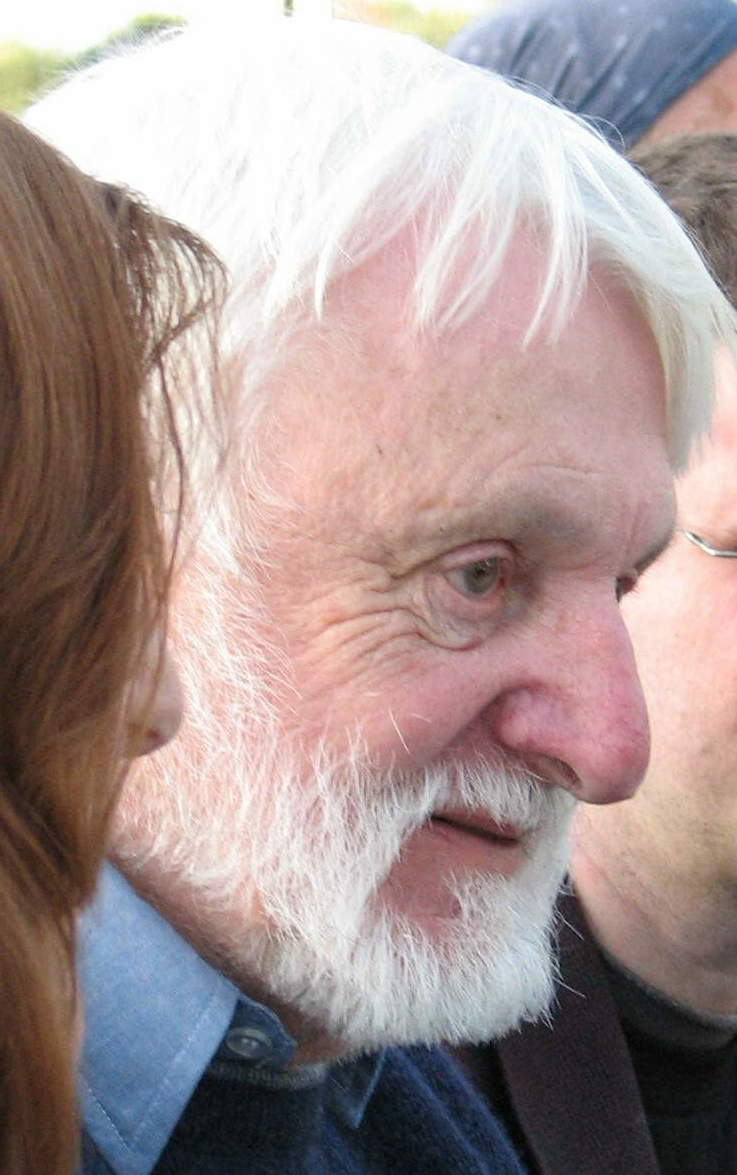
Robert M. Pirsig

Name	Class Year	Degree	Notability	References
Adya Prasad Pandey		BSc (Zoology, Botany), M.A., MBA, Ph.D.	Former Vice Chancellor; Recipient of the BHU Gold Medal	
Amara Ranatunga			Kan Singh Parihar, Sri Lankan singer	
Amarnath Sehgal			Indian sculptor, painter and poet, Padma Bhushan (2008)	
Kan Singh Parihar	Ananda Shankar		Hindustani classical musician	
Bettina Bäumer			Austrian-born Indian scholar and academic	
Bhupen Hazarika	1944; 1946	BA; MA	singer, poet, filmmaker; Recipient of the Bharat Ratna	
Byomakesh Mohanty		MA	painter	
Harivash Narayan Singh	1976, 1977	MA Economics, Diploma Journalism	Deputy Chairperson of the Rajya Sabha, the upper house of the Indian Parliament	
Harivansh Rai Bachchan			Hindi poet	
Kamala Shankar		M.Sc., Ph.D.	Hindustani classical musician	
Kamalesh Chandra Chakrabarty		M.Sc., Ph.D.	Deputy Governor, Reserve Bank of India (2009–2014)	
K. N. Govindacharya	1962	M.Sc.	environmentalist, social activist	
Koenraad Elst			Belgian scholar	
Lakshmi Kant Jha			Former Governor of the Reserve Bank of India (1967-70), Governor of Jammu & Kashmir, Ambassador of India to the United States, and civil servant	
Madhav Sadashiv Golwalkar	1926, 1928	B.Sc., M.Sc.	Second Sarsanghchalak (Supreme Chief) of the Rashtriya Swayamsevak Sangh	
Mannu Bhandari	1953	M.A	Acclaimed Hindi writer	
Moti BA		B.A.	Bhojpuri language Poet and Author	
Osnat Elkabir			Israeli singer, dancer and theatre director	
Patrick Moutal	1976; 1978; 1979; 1983	B.Sc., M.Sc., M.A., Ph.D.	French musician and Chevalier dans l'Ordre des Arts et des Lettres awardee	
Paul William Roberts		studied Sanskrit	writer	
Radha Burnier		B.A., M.A	Theosophist	
Ritwik Sanyal	1980	M.A., Ph.D.	Hindustani classical musician, Dhrupad vocalist	
Robert M. Pirsig			American philosopher	
Raimon Panikkar			Spanish theologian	
Sameer Anjaan		M.Com.	lyricist	
Sandeep Das		BA (English Literature)	Tabla player; Recipient of the BHU Gold Medal, Grammy Award	
Shiba Prasad Chatterjee			Geographer	
Sarveshwar Dayal Saxena			poet	
Shivamurthy Shivacharya Mahaswamiji		Ph.D.	social activist, educationist	
Veena Pandey		B.A., M.A., Ph.D. in Hindi	Politician, Former Member of Legislative Council, Politician	
Vibhuti Narayan Singh		M.A.	last Maharaja of Benares; social activist; Chancellor of BHU	
Vina Mazumdar			feminist, academic, pioneer of women's studies	

==== Social sciences ====
Name	Class Year	Degree	Notability	References
Ahmad Hasan Dani	1944	M.A.	Pakistani archaeologist and historian	
Awadh Kishore Narain	1947	M.A.	archaeologist, historian, academic	
Bellikoth Raghunath Shenoy	1929	M.A.	classical liberal economist	
Bindeshwar Pathak	1964	B.A. Sociology	Padma Bhushan awardee Founder, Sulabh International	
Colin Turnbull		MA	British-American anthropologist	
Ram Raj Pant	1941; 1943	LLB; MA	founder of Nepal Law College; pioneering linguist of Nepali language	

==== Literature ====
- Sitaram Chaturvedi (B.A., M.A., Ph.D.), playwright, academic
- Janki Ballabh Shastri, Indian Hindi poet, writer and critic, Padma Shri (2010)
- Atul Kumar Rai (B.Mus. Tabla) (M.P.A. Musicology) Sahitya Academy Award winner

==== Politicians ====
- Ved Prakash Goyal, politician
- Rajesh Kumar Mishra, politician
- Yadunandan Sharma (B.A. 1929), Indian independence activist, farmers' rights activist
- Shyama Charan Shukla, Chief Minister of Madhya Pradesh
- Veena Pandey, (B.A., M.A., B.Ed., LLB, Ph.D.), Former M.L.C., National Executive Member, B.J.P. Former Vice President Student Union B.H.U.

Name	Class Year	Degree	Notability	References
Amod Prasad Upadhyay			Minister of Education and Sports, Nepal	
Anil Srivastava				
Ashok Mitra		M.A.	politician, finance Minister of West Bengal	
Bhola Paswan Shastri,			Former Chief Minister Of Bihar	
Iswar Prasanna Hazarika,			Former Lok Sabha MP, former Director of NTPC, MMTC, STC etc.	
Janaki Ballabh Patnaik	1949	M.A.	politician, former Chief Minister of Odisha	
Jagjivan Ram			4th Deputy Prime Minister of India	
Mahendra Nath Pandey		M. A., Ph.D. Hindi	politician, MP, Minister in union cabinet	
Manoj Sinha		M.Tech	Lieutenant Governor of Jammu and Kashmir, former Member of parliament	
Mohamed Ayub	1985	M. Surgery	MLA in Sixteenth Legislative Assembly of Uttar Pradesh	
Manoj Tiwari		M.P.Ed.		
Sarat Chandra Sinha			politician, Chief Minister of Assam	
Shankar Dayal Singh		BA	Member of Lok Sabha	
Ram Bahadur Rai		MA Economics	senior Hindi journalist, former editor Jansatta	

- Vina Mazumdar, academic and founding Director of the Centre for Women's Development Studies (CWDS)

=== Science and technology ===
- Prem Saran Satsangi Sahab, Leader of Radhasoami Faith, Dayalbagh. System Scientist and Physicist. (Ex Dean IIT Delhi, EX-Vice chancellor, Dayalbagh Educational Institute)
- Ashok Agarwal (B.Sc. 1975, M.Sc. 1977, Ph.D. 1983), pioneer in reproductive biology
- Girish Saran Agarwal (M.Sc.), physicist specialising in quantum optics; Regents Professor in the Department of Physics of Oklahoma State University; winner of the Shanti Swarup Bhatnagar Prize (Physics) in 1982; elected Fellow of the Royal Society in 2008
- Pulickel Ajayan (B.Tech. 1985), pioneer in nanotechnology
- Nikesh Arora (B.Tech. 1989), senior vice president and chief business officer at Google
- Meenakshi Banerjee, scientist
- Bir Bhanu, (B.Tech. 1972), Electronics Engineering, Bourns Presidential Chair in Engineering and Distinguished Professor of Electrical and Computer Engineering University of California, Riverside, California
- Alok Bhattacharya, Parasitologist and Shanti Swarup Bhatnagar laureate
- Nishith Gupta (M.Sc. 1999), molecular biologist
- Achal Das Bohra (B.Sc. 1941), government administrator, engineer
- S. Ganesh (PhD 1996), molecular geneticist, N-Bios laureate
- Vinod Kumar Gaur, seismologist, Shanti Swarup Bhatnagar laureate
- Kota Harinarayana (B.Tech. 1965), scientist, academic
- Aldas Janaiah (Ph.D. 1995), agricultural scientist
- Arvind Mohan Kayastha (B.Sc. 1979, M.Sc. 1982, Ph.D. 1988), scientist, academic
- Akhlesh Lakhtakia (B.Tech. 1979, D.Sc. 2006), pioneered sculptured thin films
- Subhash Chandra Lakhotia, cytogeneticist, Shanti Swarup Bhatnagar laureate
- Devendra Lal, geophysicist; winner of the Shanti Swarup Bhatnagar Prize (Physics) in 1967; elected Fellow of the Royal Society in 1979
- Shrikant Lele, metallurgical engineer, Shanti Swarup Bhatnagar laureate
- Anand Mohan (B.Sc. 1976, Ph.D. 1983), geologist
- Basanti Dulal Nagchaudhuri (B.Sc. 1936), physicist
- Nishtala Appala Narasimham (M.Sc. 1945, Ph.D. 1952), physicist
- Jayant Vishnu Narlikar (B.Sc. 1957), theoretical physicist, Padma Vibhushan (1965)
- Paramasivam Natarajan, photochemist, Shanti Swarup Bhatnagar laureate
- Sri Niwas, geophysicist, Shanti Swarup Bhatnagar laureate
- Ganesh Prasad Pandey, organic chemist, Shanti Swarup Bhatnagar laureate
- Virendra Nath Pandey, Molecular virologist, Shanti Swarup Bhatnagar laureate
- T. V. Ramakrishnan (B.Sc. 1959, M.Sc. 1961), theoretical physicist; winner of the Shanti Swarup Bhatnagar Prize (Physics) in 1982; elected Fellow of the Royal Society in 2000
- Shyam Sundar Rai, seismologist, Shanti Swarup Bhatnagar laureate
- Madisetti Anant Ramlu, founder and first Head of the Department of Mining Engineering at the Indian Institute of Technology (IIT)
- Ayyagari Sambasiva Rao, founder of ECIL
- C. N. R. Rao (M.Sc. 1953), chemist; scientific advisor to the Prime Minister of India; Bharat Ratna laureate in 2014
- Ram Harsh Singh, Padmashri awardee 2016, ABMS 1961(BHU), MD(Hons), Ph.D. 1969 (BHU), D.Litt. FNA IM, Life-time Distinguished Professor, Faculty of Ayurveda BHU, First Vice Chancellor, Rajasthan Ayurved University, Jodhpur (2003–2006).
- Narla Tata Rao, former chairman of the Andhra Pradesh State Electricity Board
- Palle Rama Rao (Ph.D.), metallurgist and Padma Vibhushan awardee
- Patcha Ramachandra Rao (M.Sc. 1965, Ph.D. 1968), metallurgist, Shanti Swarup Bhatnagar laureate, Vice Chancellor of BHU
- Udipi Ramachandra Rao (M.Sc. 1952), space scientist, Chairman of ISRO
- N. A. Ramaiah physical chemist, Shanti Swarup Bhatnagar laureate
- Gangadhar J. Sanjayan, bioorganic chemist, Shanti Swarup Bhatnagar laureate
- Mushi Santappa, polymer chemist, Shanti Swarup Bhatnagar laureate
- Debi Prasad Sarkar, Immunologist, Shanti Swarup Bhatnagar laureate
- Jagdish Shukla (B.Sc. 1962, M.Sc. 1964, Ph.D. 1971), meteorologist
- Lalji Singh, molecular biologist, Vice Chancellor of BHU
- Nagendra Kumar Singh (B.Sc. 1978, M.Sc. 1980), agricultural scientist; pioneer in mapping plant genomes
- Rishi Narain Singh, geophysicist, Shanti Swarup Bhatnagar laureate
- Manick Sorcar (B.Tech.), artist, engineer, entrepreneur
- Brahm Shanker Srivastava, microbiologist, Shanti Swarup Bhatnagar laureate
- Onkar Nath Srivastava (MSc 1961 and PhD 1966), material physicist and a recipient of Padma Shri and Shanti Swarup Bhatnagar Prize
- M. J. Thirumalachar, Shanti Swarup Bhatnagar laureate
- Satish K. Tripathi (B.Sc., M.Sc.), President of University at Buffalo, The State University of New York
- Prahalad Chunnilal Vaidya, physicist and mathematician; proponent of Vaidya Metric for gravitational fields; Vice Chancellor of Gujarat University
- A. N. Rai ex vc NEHU
- Sandeep Verma, bioorganic chemist, Shanti Swarup Bhatnagar laureate
- Kameshwar C. Wali (M.Sc.), research physicist and science writer
- Saket Kushwaha (B.Sc. 1983, M.Sc. 1986, Ph.D. 1992), agricultural economist, VC Rajiv Gandhi University
- Jay Chaudhry (B.Tech. 1980) Founder & CEO, Zscaler

=== Sports ===
Name	Class Year	Degree	College	Notability	References
Divya Singh		BA		Captain of Indian Women's Basketball team	

== Notable faculty ==
=== Arts, humanities and social sciences ===
- Adya Prasad Pandey, Professor in Economics and Former Head Department of Economics, Vice Chancellor Manipur University
- Anant Sadashiv Altekar, Manindra Chandra Nandi Chair of Ancient History & Culture; led archaeological excavation of Mauryan era structures
- V. Balaji, Professor of Violin
- Chandrakala Padia, professor, political science, noted political scientist
- C. V. Chandrasekhar, Professor of Performing Arts; Bharata Natyam dancer; Sangeet Natak Akademi Award winner; Kalidas Samman and Padma Bhushan awardee
- A.K. Chatterjee, Professor of philosophy, Indian philosopher and Buddhist scholar
- Sitaram Chaturvedi, Professor of Literature, playwright
- Amiya Kumar Dasgupta, Professor of Economics (1947–1958); pioneer of economics in Independent India
- Girija Devi, Professor of Performing Arts; Hindustani classical vocalist
- Julius Getman, Visiting professor of Law
- Chandradhar Sharma Guleri, former Manindra Chandra Nandi Chair in Ancient History and Religion
- Latika Katt, Professor of Visual Arts; sculptor
- Sucheta Kripalani, Professor of Constitutional History
- Dalsukh Dahyabhai Malvania, Jain scholar, writer and Padma Bhushan awardee
- Lalmani Misra, Professor of Music; Hindustani classical musician
- Ram Shankar Misra, Professor of Comparative Religion
- Awadh Kishore Narain, Professor of History (1947–1960); Manindra Chandra Nandi Chair of Ancient History & Culture (1960–1971)
- B.C. Nirmal, Professor of Law
- N. Rajam, Professor of Performing Arts
- S. R. Ranganathan, Professor of Library Science (1945–1947); inventor of colon classification and five laws of library science
- Ritwik Sanyal, Professor of Performing Arts; Hindustani classical musician
- Ram Chandra Shukla, Professor of Visual Arts; painter
- Ramchandra Shukla, Professor of Literature
- Gurbachan Singh Talib, Professor of Sikh Studies
- Omkarnath Thakur, Professor of Performing Arts; Hindustani classical musician
- Koushal Kishor Mishra, Professor of Political Sciences, and Dean, Faculty of Social Sciences
- Alok Kumar Rai, Professor of Management Studies

=== Science and technology ===
- Prem Saran Satsangi Sahab, Leader of Radhasoami Faith, Dayalbagh. System Scientist and Physicist. (Ex Dean IIT Delhi, EX-Vice chancellor, Dayalbagh Educational Institute)
- Sir Shanti Swaroop Bhatnagar, Professor of Chemistry (1921–1924); co-inventor of Bhatnagar-Mathur Magnetic Interference Balance; founding chairman of Council of Scientific and Industrial Research
- Patcha Ramachandra Rao, former Vice Chancellor and Professor of Metallurgy and Material Science
- Prafulla Kumar Jena, former professor of Metallurgical Engineering
- Prakash Chandra Sood, Padma Shri, Nuclear scientist, researcher, and Professor
- Madhu Sudan Kanungo, Professor of Biology (1962–2011); pioneer of gerontology; Padma Shri awardee
- Arvind Mohan Kayastha, Professor of Biotechnology
- Shrikant Lele, metallurgical engineer, Shanti Swarup Bhatnagar laureate
- Veer Bhadra Mishra, former professor of Civil Engineering; environmentalist; founder of Swatcha Ganga Campaign
- Ganesh Prasad, Professor of Mathematics (1917–1923); mathematician
- Palle Rama Rao, Professor of Metallurgy (1962–1982); scientist; Padma Shri, Padma Bhushan and Padma Vibhushan awardee
- Birbal Sahni, Professor of Botany (1920); authority on plant fossils of Gondwana and Jurassic age
- Ram Harsh Singh Padmashri awardee 2016, ABMS 1961(BHU), MD(Hons), Ph.D. 1969 (BHU), D.Litt. FNA IM, Life-time Distinguished Professor, Faculty of Ayurveda BHU, First Vice Chancellor, Rajasthan Ayurved University, Jodhpur (2003–2006).
- Onkar Nath Srivastava Professor of the department of physics, material physicist and a recipient of Padma Shri and Shanti Swarup Bhatnagar Prize
- Birendra Bijoy Biswas, lecturer (1952–54); department of botany, recipient of Shanti Swarup Bhatnagar Prize
- Jamuna Sharan Singh, ecologist, Shanti Swarup Bhatnagar Prize recipient
- Kamanio Chattopadhyay, materials engineer, Shanti Swarup Bhatnagar Prize recipient
- Sunit Kumar Singh, molecular biologist, Fellow of Indian Academy of Neuroscience (FIANS)
- Anil Kumar Tripathi (BSc, MSc, PhD; director Indian Institute of Science Education and Research, Mohali
