= Ram Shankar =

Ram Shankar may refer to:

- Ram Shankar Katheria, Indian politician
- Ram Shankar Misra, professor of religion
- Ram Shankar Tripathi, Indian scholar of Buddhism
- Ram Shankar (bowls)

== See also ==
- Ram (disambiguation)
- Shankar (disambiguation)
- Ram Shankar Nikumbh, a fictional character played by Aamir Khan in the 2008 Indian film Taare Zameen Par
