= Dalsukh Dahyabhai Malvania =

- Born: 22 July 1910; Sayla, Surendranagar district, Gujarat, India
- Died: 2000
- Awards: Padma Bhushan

Dalsukh Dahyabhai Malvania (1910–2000) was an Indian scholar, writer and philosopher, known for his writings on Jain, Buddhist and Hindu philosophies. He contributed to Jain literature with his writings on the scriptures of the Śvētāmbara sect of Jainism. The Government of India awarded him the third highest civilian honour of the Padma Bhushan, in 1992, for his contributions to literature and education.

== Biography ==
Dalsukh Malvania was born on 22 July 1910 at Sayla, in the Surendranagar district of the Indian state of Gujarat in a Jain family. After completing Nyayatirtha in 1931, he joined the Banaras Hindu University as a faculty member and worked there till he moved to the L. D. Institute of Indology of the Gujarat University as its director in 1959. He was associated with several literary societies and organizations such as the Prakrit Text Society, the Jain Cultural Research Society, Jain Sahitya Nirman Yojana, Prakrit Vidya Mandal and was a visiting professor of Indian Philosophy at the University of Toronto and Maharaja Sayajirao University of Baroda. Sambodhi, twelve-volume recreation of the ancient scripture, Encyclopedia of Indian Philosophies and Evolution of Indian Philosophies, both running into multiple volumes, and Jainism : some essays are some of his notable works. He also published many articles on Jainism and Indian philosophy, including Beginnings of Jaina Philosophy in the Acàraňga, The Word Pǖjā and its Meaning and On Bhadreshwara's Kahāvali. He was a recipient of the civilian honor of the Padma Bhushan from the Government of India in 1992. He died in 2000 at the age of 90.

== See also ==
- Sukhlal Sanghvi
- List of Banaras Hindu University people
- List of Gujarati-language writers
