= Osnat Elkabir =

Osnat Elkabir אסנת אלכביר
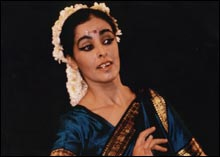
- Education: India
- Alma mater: Banaras Hindu University
- Style: Classical Indian

Osnat Elkabir (Hebrew: אסנת אלכביר) is an Israeli singer, dancer, painter and theatre director. She has studied classical Indian dance and music at Banaras Hindu University in India for over ten years. Currently she teaches classical Indian theatre, dance and music at Tel Aviv University.

== Study and early career ==
Coming to India in the year 1990 she began studying Brhamari painting from Buddhadev Chaitanya in Uttarpara (a small town near Kolkata). Coming from a renowned artistic family, Buddhadev was a painter, dancer and musician. He developed upon his father's technique of Bhramari painting, a technique based on improvisational methods with Tantric influences. Following her painting lessons, Osnat began studying Bhramari Kathak dance from Buddhadev. She went on to perform in various venues in India alongside her teacher and his wife, the German-born, Christa Chaitanya.

In the 1990s she studied Pakhavaj drumming from Chatrapati Singh the late Raja of Bijna. She won her Bachelor and Master degrees in classical Indian music and dance, and studied Dhrupad singing with professor Ritwik Sanyal the renowned Dhrupad singer, disciple of the late Zia Mohiuddin Dagar and dean of the faculty of music in Banaras Hindu University.

== Artistic activity ==
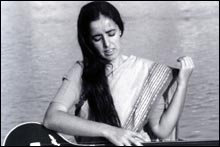
Dhrupad singing on the Ganges

Since the late 1990s, Osnat has been dividing her time between India and Israel. She has been performing Indian classical dance and Dhrupad singing in various venues in Israel and abroad, lecturing and teaching in Rimon School of Jazz and Contemporary Music, Levinsky College, Tel Aviv University and various other institutions.

During the years 2002, 2003 and 2004, she directed theatre performances for the annual Festival of Alternative Theatre in Akko under the title Common Language (Hebrew: שפה משותפת). The project involved young Israeli Muslim, Jewish and Christian actors and made use of Indian theatrical techniques and themes.

In 2003, Where The Two Rivers Meet, a book of her Indian memoirs, was published. And in 2004 she collaborated with Zvia Fine on an Indian geography textbook for primary school.

She lives in Tel Aviv, and is currently working on a children multimedia project.

== See also ==
- Music of India
- Hindustani classical music
- Dance in India
- Rudra Veena
- Natya Shastra of Bharata
- Rasa (aesthetics)
