= Ram Harsh Singh =

Ayurveda practitioner (born 1942)

- Born: 10 January 1942 (age 84); Kaniyari pur, Mau district, Uttar Pradesh, India
- Died: August 20, 2023 (aged 81); Varanasi
- Education: Institute of Medical Sciences, Banaras Hindu University
- Occupation: Ayurveda practitioner
- Years active: Since 1961
- Awards: Padma Shri; MGIMS Lifetime Achievement Award; BHU Distinguished Alumnus Award

Ram Harsh Singh is an Indian practitioner of the Ayurveda system of alternative medicine and the founder vice chancellor of Dr. Sarvepalli Radhakrishnan Rajasthan Ayurved University. An Emeritus Professor of Banaras Hindu University and a National Professor of the Ministry of AYUSH of the Government of India, he was conferred with the fourth highest civilian honour of Padma Shri, in 2016.

== Biography ==
R. H. Singh was born on 10 January 1942 in Kaniyari pur village of Mau district in the Indian state of Uttar Pradesh and graduated in Ayurveda Medicine and Surgery (ABMS) from Banaras Hindu University (BHU) in 1961. Starting as a faculty member, he served in various positions at his alma mater, BHU. His guide for doctoral degree (PhD) was K. N. Udupa, the pioneer of integrative medicine and the founder director of the Institute of Medical Sciences, Banaras Hindu University. In 2003, when the Dr. Sarvepalli Radhakrishnan Rajasthan Ayurved University was established at Jodhpur, he was appointed as its founder vice chancellor. and served at the post till 2006. He also serves as a visiting professor at the College of Ayurveda of Mount Madonna Institute, USA.

Singh is the founder president of the Association of Ayurvedic Physicians of India and a former chairman of the scientific advisory board of the Central Council for Research in Ayurvedic Sciences, an autonomous body under the Ministry of AYUSH. He is also a member of the National Commission on History of Science of the Indian National Science Academy. His research on Ayurveda has been documented by way of over 200 research papers and 15 text books.

== Awards and honors ==
He was awarded with a Lifetime achievement Award by Mahatma Gandhi Institute of Medical Sciences (MGIMS) in 2007, the same year as he was made the Emeritus Professor of Banaras Hindu University. He is an elected fellow of the National Academy of Indian Medicine and a National Professor at the Ministry of AYUSH of the Government of India. The Government of India awarded him the civilian honor of the Padma Shri in 2016.
