= Veena Pandey =

Indian politician

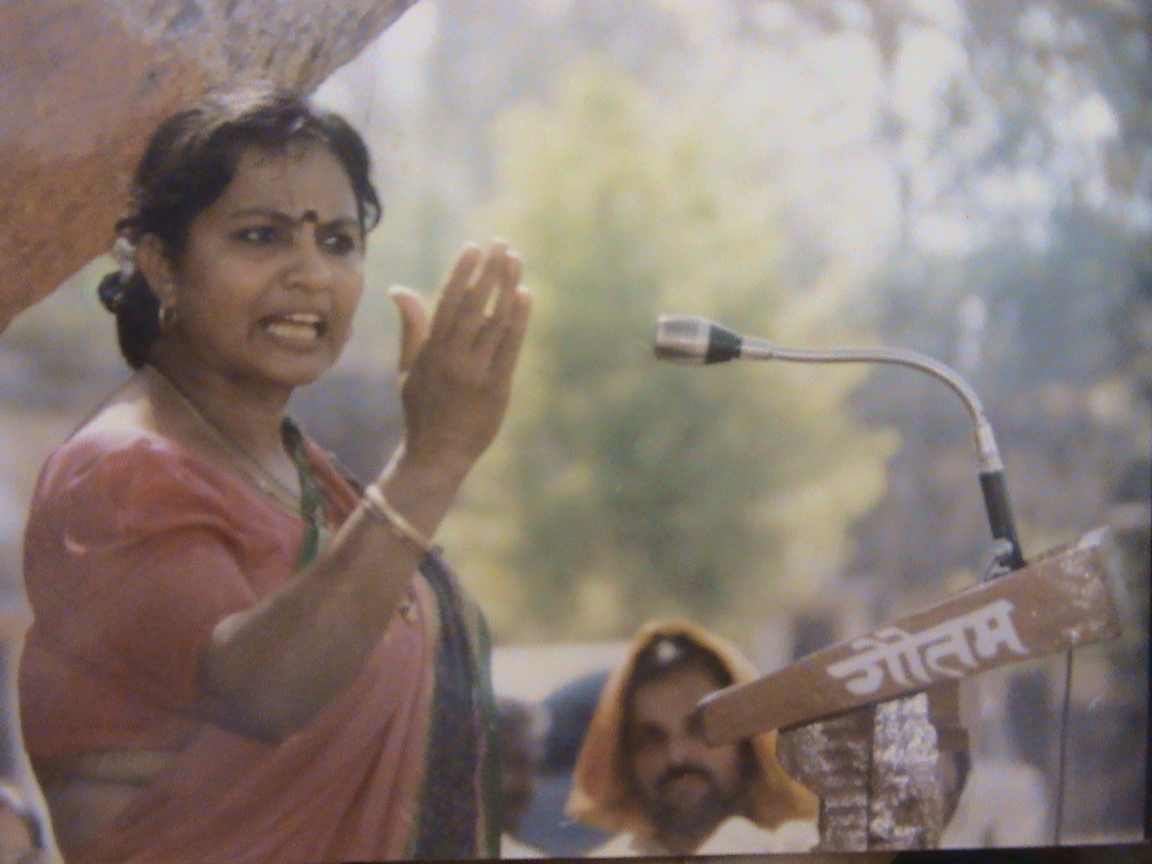

Member of the Uttar Pradesh Legislative Council

Member of the BJP National Executive
- In office 2012–2015

Personal details
- Party: BJP
- Education: Banaras Hindu University

Veena Pandey is an Indian politician who is a former member of the Uttar Pradesh Legislative Council. She was Student Union Vice-President at Banaras Hindu University from 1982–83. Veena Pandey has held the post of Uttar Pradesh BJP General Secretary, and is also the national Vice-President of BJP Mahila Morcha. She has been a member of the National Executive of the Bharatiya Janata Party from 2012 until 2015.
