= Rishi Narain Singh =

Indian geophysicist

- Born: 17 July 1943 (age 83); Bajha, Mirzapur district, Uttar Pradesh, India
- Education: Banaras Hindu University; Dalhousie University; Memorial University of Newfoundland
- Known for: Modelling of the thermomechanical structure of the Indian lithosphere
- Awards: 1985 Shanti Swarup Bhatnagar Prize; 2004 IGU; 2014 MoES National Award in Geoscience and Technology
- Scientific career
- Fields: Geophysics
- Workplaces: National Geophysical Research Institute; Fourth Paradigm Institute; National Environmental Engineering Research Institute; Indian Institute of Geomagnetism Academy of Scientific and Innovative Research; IIT Gandhinagar

Rishi Narain Singh (born 1943) is an Indian geophysicist and an emeritus Professor of the National Geophysical Research Institute, Hyderabad. He is known for his researches on the quantification of geological processes and is an elected fellow of the Indian National Science Academy and the Indian Academy of Sciences. The Council of Scientific and Industrial Research, the apex agency of the Government of India for scientific research, awarded him the Shanti Swarup Bhatnagar Prize for Science and Technology, one of the highest Indian science awards for his contributions to Earth, Atmosphere, Ocean and Planetary Sciences in 1985.

== Biography ==
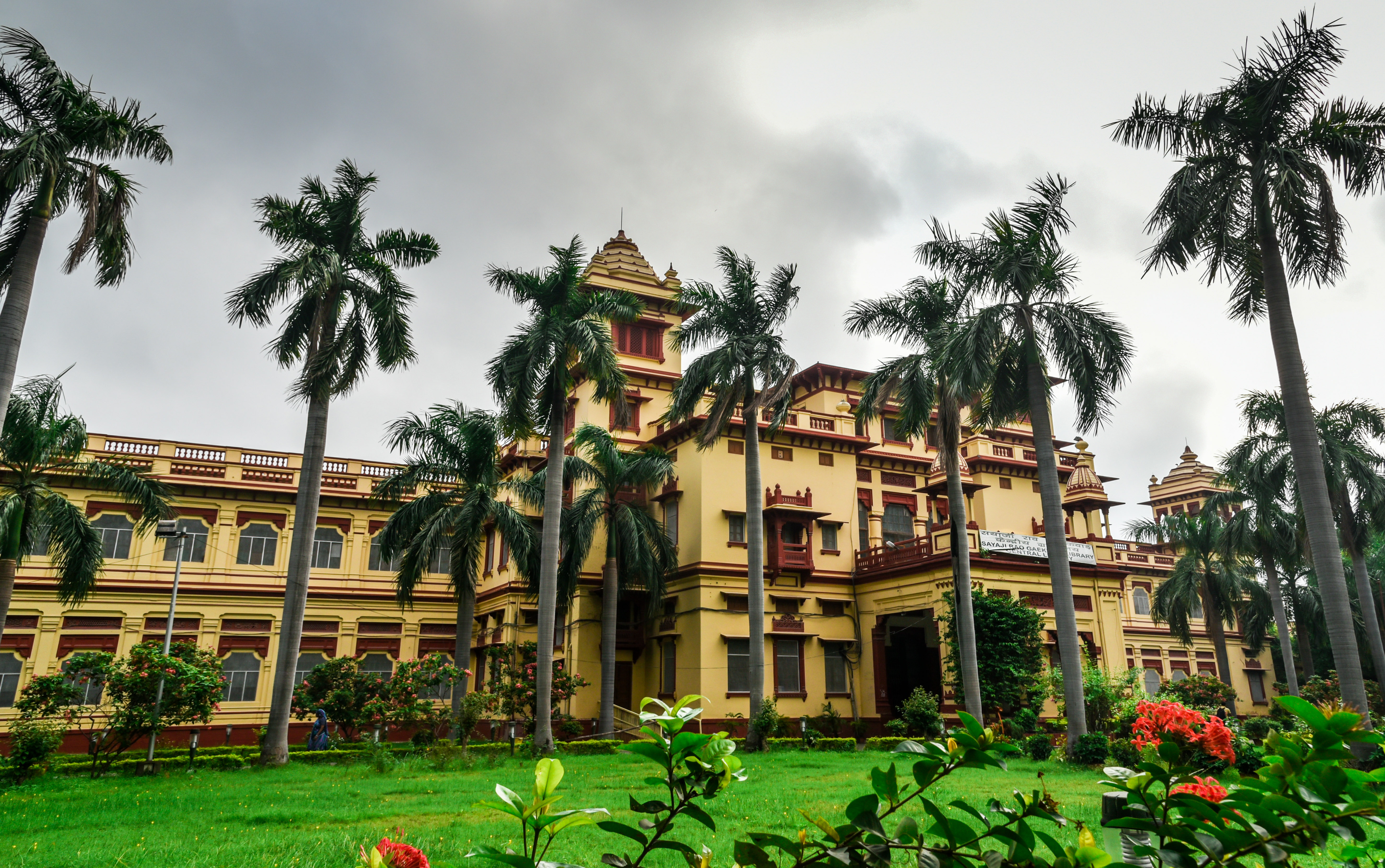
Banaras Hindu University

R. N. Singh, born on 17 July 1943 in Bajha, a small village in the Mirzapur district of the Indian state of Uttar Pradesh to a school teacher, did his early schooling at local village schools. His graduate degree in science came from Banaras Hindu University in 1962 after which he continued at the university to obtain a master's degree in 1964 and a doctoral degree in 1969, both in geophysics. Subsequently, he joined National Geophysical Research Institute of the Council of Scientific and Industrial Research in 1964 and served the institute for the rest of his career, barring three stints outside on deputation. While at NGRI, he took a hiatus and did his post-doctoral research at Dalhousie University and Memorial University of Newfoundland during 1970–73. Back at NGRI, he continued his service when he was sent to the Indian Institute of Geomagnetism in 1977 as an assistant professor where he worked for one year. In 1996, he was deputed to Fourth Paradigm Institute, then known as the CSIR Centre for Mathematical Modelling and Computer Simulation, as the scientist-in-charge and in 1999, he was shifted to National Environmental Engineering Research Institute as its director. He returned to NGRI in 2003 and served out his service there to superannuate in 2005. Post-retirement, he continued his association with the institute as an CSIR Emeritus Scientist during 2005–10 and as an INSA Senior Scientist during 2010–15. Since then, he serves as an honorary professor at Academy of Scientific and Innovative Research of NGIR and as a visiting professor at IIT Gandhinagar.

== Legacy ==
The prime focus of Singh's researches were on designing methodologies for the quantification of geological processes. During his days at NEERI, he worked on introducing mathematical modeling for use in developing environmental technologies and evolved models of several geophysical and environmental processes such as the models of heat conduction processes in stratified crust, linear surface heat flow and surface heat generation using Thomson-Haskell matrix method which helped in quantifying the lithospheric geodynamics. The Cuddapah basin, south Indian high grade metamorphic terrains, Afanasi Nikitin seamount, Carlsberg Ridge, and fracture zones in the Indian Oceanic lithosphere are some of the other models developed by him. He is credited with using rheological laws of rock forming minerals for the first time in India which he used for profiling the Indian continental lithosphere. His studies have been detailed in over 150 peer-reviewed articles; (Note: Please see Selected bibliography section) ResearchGate, an online article repository has listed 110 of them. Besides, he co-edited a text, Magmatic and Allied Processes, which contains three chapters written by him.

Singh delivered a series of lectures in the 1970s propagating the inverse theory in geophysics and was involved in the coordination of more than one hundred environmental impact and risk assessment reports. He was involved in the development of CSIR Centre for Mathematical Modelling and Computer Simulation during his early years and sat in the editorial boards of the Journal of Earth System Sciences of Indian Academy of Sciences and Proceedings of the Indian National Science Academy (Physical Sciences). He was also a member of the council of the Indian National Science Academy during 2000-02 and was the guide for nine scholars in their doctoral studies.

== Awards and honors ==
The Council of Scientific and Industrial Research awarded Singh the Shanti Swarup Bhatnagar Prize, one of the highest Indian science awards, in 1985. The Indian Academy of Sciences elected him as a fellow in 1988 and the Indian National Science Academy followed suit in 1991. He received the Decennial Award of the Indian Geophysical Union in 2004. The Ministry of Earth Sciences awarded him the National Award in Geoscience and Technology in 2014.

== Selected bibliography ==
=== Books ===
- Santosh Kumar; Rishi Narain Singh (13 June 2014). Modelling of Magmatic and Allied Processes. Springer. ISBN 978-3-319-06471-0.

=== Chapters ===
- R. N. Singh, A. Manglik (June 2014). "Parameterized Mantle Convection Analysis for Crustal Processes". Modelling of Magmatic and Allied Processes. Society of Earth Scientists Series. pp. 75–88. doi:10.1007/978-3-319-06471-0_4. ISBN 978-3-319-06470-3.
- R. N. Singh, Jibamitra Ganguly (June 2014). "Modelling Paleogeotherms in the Continental Lithosphere: A Brief Review and Applications to Problems in the Indian Subcontinent". Modelling of Magmatic and Allied Processes. Society of Earth Scientists Series. pp. 89–108. doi:10.1007/978-3-319-06471-0_5. ISBN 978-3-319-06470-3.

=== Articles ===
- Verma, Saurabh K.; Singh, Rishi Narain (1970). "Transient electromagnetic response of an inhomogeneous conducting sphere". Geophysics. 35 (2): 331–336. Bibcode:1970Geop...35..331V. doi:10.1190/1.1440095.
- Singh, Rishi Narain (1973). "Propagator matrix formulation for earth currents of deep internal origin". Pure and Applied Geophysics. 105 (1): 858–863. Bibcode:1973PApGe.105..858S. doi:10.1007/BF00875834. S2CID 121784682.
- Singh, Rishi Narain (1974). "A method of the calculation of the mantle-electrical conductivity by the inversion of the geomagnetic secular variation data". Pure and Applied Geophysics. 112 (1): 149–152. Bibcode:1974PApGe.112..149S. doi:10.1007/BF00875929. S2CID 122013990.
- Singh, Rishi Narain; Negi, Janardan G. (1979). "A reinterpretation of the linear heat flow and heat production relationship for the exponential model of the heat production in the crust". Geophysical Journal International. 57 (3): 741–74. Bibcode:1979GeoJ...57..741S. doi:10.1111/j.1365-246X.1979.tb06787.x.
- Rai, Shivendra Nath; Singh, Rishi Narain (1981). "A mathematical model of water table fluctuation in a semi-infinite aquifer induced by localized transient recharge". Water Resources Research. 17 (4): 1028–1032. Bibcode:1981WRR....17.1028R. doi:10.1029/WR017i004p01028.

== See also ==
- Carlsberg Ridge
- Eighty Five East Ridge
