= Nishith Gupta =

Indian-German biologist

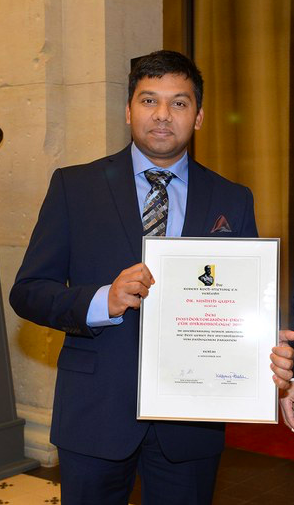
- Education: Rohilkhand university (BS); Banaras Hindu University (MS); Universität Leipzig (PhD) Humboldt-Universität (DSc)
- Known for: Optogenetics in Infections, Membrane biogenesis in Apicomplexan parasites
- Awards: 2014 Karl Asmund Rudolphi Medal 2015 Robert Koch Foundation Award BITS OPERA Award
- Scientific career
- Fields: Microbiology; Molecular biology; Parasitology; Genetic engineering
- Workplaces: Humboldt-Universität; National Jewish Health; Max Planck Society; BITS Pilani
- Thesis: "P450 Dependent Alkane Monooxygenase from Acinetobacter sp. EB104" (2003)
- Doctoral advisor: Otmar Asperger
- Website: Official Profile

Nishith Gupta is an Indian-German molecular biologist and parasitologist known for his pioneering work in the field of Host–pathogen interaction and cell signalling. He is currently working as Professor, Senior Fellow of the Wellcome Trust-DBT (India Alliance) at the Hyderabad campus of Birla Institute of Technology and Science, Pilani.

== Early life and education ==
Nishith Gupta was born in Shahjahanpur, Uttar Pradesh, India. He pursued his early education at the Rohilkhand university (BS), Banaras Hindu University (MS) and later obtained his PhD in biochemistry from Leipzig University (Germany). Afterward, he was a post-doctoral fellow at the National Jewish Medical Center in Denver, United States. He became a research group leader at the Humboldt University and affiliate scientist at the Max Planck Institute for Infection Biology in Berlin. In 2017, he was awarded Doctor habilitatus (DSc) by Humboldt University in the field of biochemistry and molecular parasitology. Currently, he is working as a Professor in the Department of Biological Sciences at the Birla Institute of Technology and Science, Pilani – Hyderabad Campus.

== Career and research ==
Nishith Gupta's research focuses on metabolic interactions between intracellular parasites and host cells. His group has published several research articles focusing on carbon metabolism, membrane biogenesis and signaling pathways primarily in a widespread model parasite Toxoplasma gondii, but also in Plasmodium, and Eimeria species.

Gupta's research on membrane biogenesis in apicomplexan parasites, involving the discovery of unique phospholipids, holds potential for advancing the development of vaccines against parasitic diseases. Notably, his work on phosphatidylcholine, phosphatidylinositol and phosphatidylethanolamine identified potential therapeutic targets, while phosphatidylthreonine and a novel phosphatidylserine decarboxylase could serve as toxoplasmosis biomarkers.

In collaboration with researchers at the University of Melbourne and National Key Laboratory of Agricultural Microbiology in Wuhan, Gupta's group has revealed Toxoplasma's metabolic adaptability and identified proteins crucial for the parasite's development, suggesting potential drug targets for toxoplasmosis and related infections. In addition, his group uncovered Plasmodium's reliance on host-derived sugars, offering new directions for the development of anti-malarial drugs.

In a pioneering collaboration with Peter Hegemann, Gupta's work in Optogenetic regulation of cyclic nucleotide signaling within Toxoplasma gondii has paved the way for broader applications of light-activated proteins and biosensors in other intracellular pathogens, including parasites, bacteria, and viruses.

== Leadership and initiatives ==
Throughout his career, Gupta has held leadership positions, including the Heisenberg Fellow of German Research Foundation (DFG) at the Humboldt University and Senior Fellow of the Wellcome Trust-DBT (India Alliance). He is currently serving as the editorial board member of Animal Diseases, Microbial Cell, and Communications Biology published by Nature Portfolio.

In 2021, he founded the Intracellular Parasite Education and Research Labs (iPEARL) in the Biological Science division of BITS Pilani and an integrated One Health initiative – Veterinary And Medical Parasite Infection Research Ensemble (VAMPIRE). These initiatives seek to support the development of future scientists and leaders and contribute to the advancement of our knowledge about parasitic infections in clinical and veterinary settings.

== Awards and recognition ==
He was awarded ESCMID research grant for his contribution to the field of clinical microbiology and infectious diseases. In 2014, he received with the Karl Asmund Rudolphi Medal, an award from the German Society for Parasitology. Following year, he received the young scientist award in Microbiology from the Robert Koch Foundation. At BITS Pilani, he received the Outstanding Potential for Excellence in Research & Academics (OPERA) award. Banaras Hindu University honoured him with distinguished alumni award in recognition of his achievements in academics and research. The Indian Council of Medical Research awarded him an International Fellowships for Senior Biomedical Scientist in collaboration with the SickKids Hospital and University of Toronto.
