= S. Ganesh =

Indian geneticist and molecular biologist

- Born: 23 May 1968 (age 58); Tamil Nadu, India
- Education: University of Madras; Banaras Hindu University; Indian Institute of Science
- Known for: Studies on Lafora progressive myoclonic epilepsy
- Awards: 2008 N-BIOS Prize; 2008 Scopus Young Indian Scientists Award; 2008 B. M. Birla Science Prize; 2010 DAE-SRC Outstanding Research Investigator Award; 2011 KU Rajib Goyal Prize; 2012 CDRI Award; 2014 ICMR Basanti Devi Amir Chand Prize; 2016 OPPI Scientist Award
- Scientific career
- Fields: Molecular genetics
- Workplaces: RIKEN Brain Science Institute; IIT Kanpur

Subramaniam Ganesh (born 23 May 1968) is an Indian geneticist, molecular biologist and a professor at the department of biological sciences and bio-engineering of the Indian Institute of Technology, Kanpur. Known for his pioneering studies on Lafora progressive myoclonic epilepsy and other neurodegenerative disorders, Ganesh is an elected fellow of the Indian Academy of Sciences and the National Academy of Sciences, India. The Department of Biotechnology of the Government of India awarded him the National Bioscience Award for Career Development, one of the highest Indian science awards, for his contributions to biosciences, in 2008.

== Biography ==
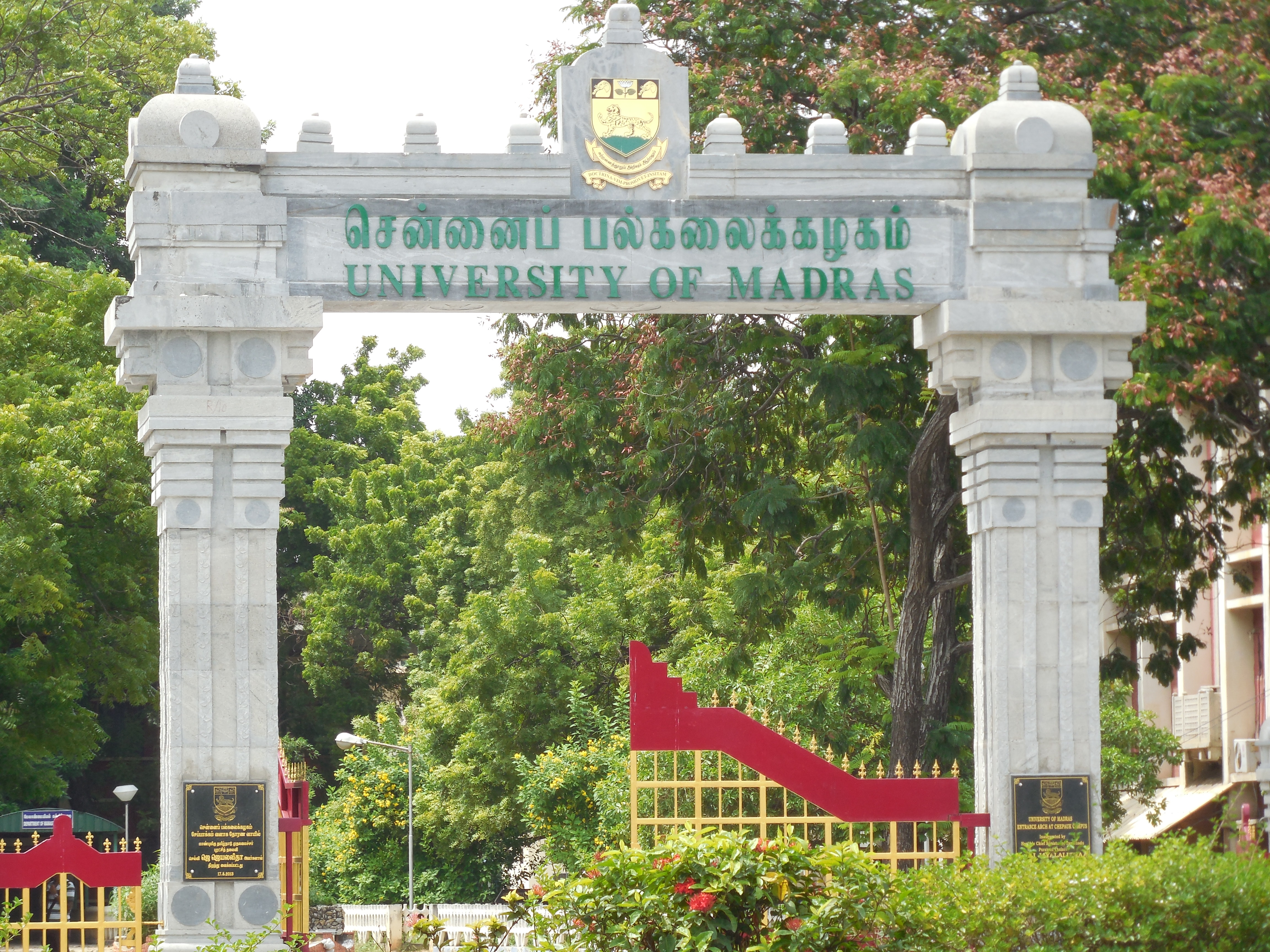
Entrance to University of Madras

Born on 23 May 1968 in the south Indian state of Tamil Nadu, Ganesh completed his undergraduate studies at the University of Madras in 1988 and earned an MSc in 1990. He joined the Banaras Hindu University for his doctoral studies to secure a PhD in 1996. His post-doctoral work was at the Indian Institute of Science from 1997 to 1998, after which he moved to Japan to start his career as a staff scientist at the RIKEN Brain Science Institute.

On his return to India in 2002, he joined the Indian Institute of Technology, Kanpur (IITK) as a member of the faculty at the department of biological sciences and bio-engineering (BSBE), where he serves as the P.K. Kelkar Chair Professor. At IITK, he set up his laboratory of human molecular genetics, popularly known as Ganesh Laboratory. He is the principal investigator, while hosting many research scholars.

Ganesh resides in IIT Campus in Kanpur, Uttar Pradesh.

== Legacy ==
Lafora disease has an autosomal recessive pattern of inheritance.

Ganesh's research focus has been in the fields of human molecular genetics and neuroscience. He has carried out extensive work on the genetic forms of neurodegenerative disorders. During his early days at IITK, he led a team of scientists researching on the Lafora disease (LD) to establish the role played by LD proteins in protein quality control and their work widened the understanding of the disorder. Later, he focused his work to other neurodegenerative disorders such as central nervous system diseases, cardiovascular disorders and developmental disorders, with emphasis on their pathways, while working on developing new therapeutic protocols. His studies have been documented by way of a number of articles. (Note: Please see Selected bibliography section) ResearchGate, an online repository of scientific articles, has listed 93 of them.

Ganesh is the chief editor of IITK Directions, a Springer publication, and has also prepared video lecture courses for the National Programming on Technology Enhanced Learning (NPTEL). The invited speeches delivered by him include the one on the Role of non-coding RNAs in cellular stress response, delivered in 2016 at the 82nd annual meeting of the Indian Academy of Sciences. He serves as an associate editor of the Journal of Genetics of the Indian Academy of Sciences, and is a former editorial board member of Meta Gene and Gene Reports, both Elsevier publications.

== Awards and honors ==
The Department of Biotechnology of the Government of India awarded him the National Bioscience Award for Career Development, one of the highest Indian science awards, in 2008. He received the Scopus Young Indian Scientists Award the same year. Also in 2008, he received the B. M. Birla Science Prize of the B. M. Birla Science Foundation. The Science Research Council of the Department of Atomic Energy selected him for the Outstanding Research Investigator Award in 2010 and he received the Rajib Goyal Prize of Kurukshetra University in 2011. The National Academy of Sciences, India elected him as a fellow in 2012; the same year as he received the CDRI Award of the Central Drug Research Institute. He received the Basanti Devi Amir Chand Prize of the Indian Council of Medical Research in 2014 and the Scientist Award of the Organisation of Pharmaceutical Producers of India in 2016. He also received the elected fellowship of the Indian Academy of Sciences in 2016. The award orations delivered by him include the 2015 edition of the K. T. Shetty Memorial Oration of the Indian Academy of Neurosciences and he has held research fellowships such as the Alexander von Humboldt fellowship, the Ramanna Fellowship of the Department of Science and Technology, and the Tata Innovation Fellowship of the Department of Biotechnology. In 2012, he was featured in the list of "Top 25 Scientists in India" published by India Today.

== Selected bibliography ==
- Rai, Anupama; Mishra, Rohit; Ganesh, Subramaniam (15 December 2017). "Suppression of leptin signaling reduces polyglucosan inclusions and seizure susceptibility in a mouse model for Lafora disease". Human Molecular Genetics. 26 (24): 4778–4785. doi:10.1093/hmg/ddx357. ISSN 0964-6906. PMID 28973665.
- Parihar, Rashmi; Ganesh, Subramaniam (1 September 2016). "Autism genes: the continuum that connects us all". Journal of Genetics. 95 (3): 481–483. doi:10.1007/s12041-016-0688-0. ISSN 0022-1333. PMID 27659318. S2CID 4018645.
- Upadhyay, Mamta; Bhadauriya, Pratibha; Ganesh, Subramaniam (2016). "Heat shock modulates the subcellular localization, stability, and activity of HIPK2". Biochemical and Biophysical Research Communications. 472 (4): 580–584. doi:10.1016/j.bbrc.2016.03.035. PMID 26972256.

== See also ==
- Autism spectrum disorder
- Genetic disorder
