= Shrikant Lele =

Indian metallurgical engineer

- Born: 24 January 1943 (age 83); Uttar Pradesh, India
- Education: Indian Institute of Technology (BHU) Varanasi
- Known for: Studies on structural metallurgy
- Awards: 1987 Shanti Swarup Bhatnagar Prize; 2010 INSA Professor Brahm Prakash Memorial Medal
- Scientific career
- Fields: Metallurgy
- Workplaces: Indian Institute of Technology (BHU) Varanasi

Shrikant Lele (born 1943) is an Indian metallurgical engineer and a distinguished professor of Indian Institute of Technology (BHU) Varanasi. He is a former director of the Institute of Technology of the university (2002–05) and is known for his studies on structural metallurgy. He is credited with reportedly original work on X-ray diffraction effects, solid state and martensitic transformations as well as spinodal decomposition in alloys and electron diffraction from quasicrystals. His researches have been documented in several peer-reviewed articles; (Note: Please see Selected articles section) and Google Scholar the online article repository of Indian Academy of Sciences has listed 33 of them.

Born on 24 January 1943, Shrikant Lele is the author of a book, Thermodynamics of Materials (Cambridge Solid State Science Series) and has also contributed chapters to books published by others. He is associated with the INSPIRE program of the Department of Science and Technology as a member of its Engineering section and is an elected fellow of the Indian Academy of Sciences, and the National Academy of Sciences, India. The Council of Scientific and Industrial Research, the apex agency of the Government of India for scientific research, awarded him the Shanti Swarup Bhatnagar Prize for Science and Technology, one of the highest Indian science awards for his contributions to Engineering Sciences in 1987. (Note: Long link - please select award year to see details) He received the Professor Brahm Prakash Memorial Medal of the Indian National Science Academy in 2010. The Defence Metallurgical Research Laboratory organized a conference on Advanced X-Ray Techniques in Research and Industry in honour of Lele on the occasion of his 60th birth anniversary.

== Selected bibliography ==
=== Books ===
- P. Ramachandra Rao, Shrikant Lele (1992). Thermodynamics of Materials. Cambridge Solid State Science Series. ISBN 978-0521373470.

=== Chapters ===
- D. Pandey; V. K. Wadhawan; Shrikant Lele (chapter) (January 1989). "Diffraction from 1D Quasicrystals". Modulated Structures, Polytypes and Quasicrystals. CRC Press. pp. 627–. ISBN 978-0-677-25810-2.
- S Steeb; Shrikant Lele (chapter) (2 December 2012). "On Complex Formation in Molten Alloys and its Role in Glass Formation". Rapidly Quenched Metals. Elsevier. pp. 177–. ISBN 978-0-444-60111-7.

=== Selected articles ===
- V. K. Kabra, D. Pandey, S. Lele (1988). "On the calculation of diffracted intensities from SiC crystals undergoing 2H to 6H transformation by the layer displacement mechanism". Journal of Applied Crystallography. 21 (a): 935–942. Bibcode:1988JApCr..21..935K. doi:10.1107/S0021889888008064.
- B. Nageswara Sarma, S. Srinivas Prasad, S. Vijayvergiya, V. Bharath Kumar, S. Lele (2003). "Existence domains for invariant reactions in binary regular solution phase diagrams exhibiting two phases". Bulletin of Materials Science. 26 (4) (published June 2003): 423–430. doi:10.1007/BF02711187.
- B. Nageswara Sarma, Shrikant Lele (2005). "Transformations among CE–CVM model parameters for multicomponent systems". Bulletin of Materials Science. 28 (3) (published June 2005): 293–298. doi:10.1007/BF02711263.
- Bandikatla N. Sarma, Shreyansh N. Shah, Manoj Kumar, Shrikant Lele (2012). "Thermodynamics of dilute binary solid solutions using the cluster variation method". International Journal of Materials Research. 103 (10) (published October 2012): 1188–1200. Bibcode:2012IJMR..103.1188S. doi:10.3139/146.110755. S2CID 97455418.
- Vikas Jindal, Shrikant Lele (2011). "An Improved CVM Entropy Functional for BCC Alloys". Computational Materials Science. 84 (published March 2014): 129–133. arXiv:1105.0536. doi:10.1016/j.commatsci.2013.11.062.
