= Sunit Kumar Singh =

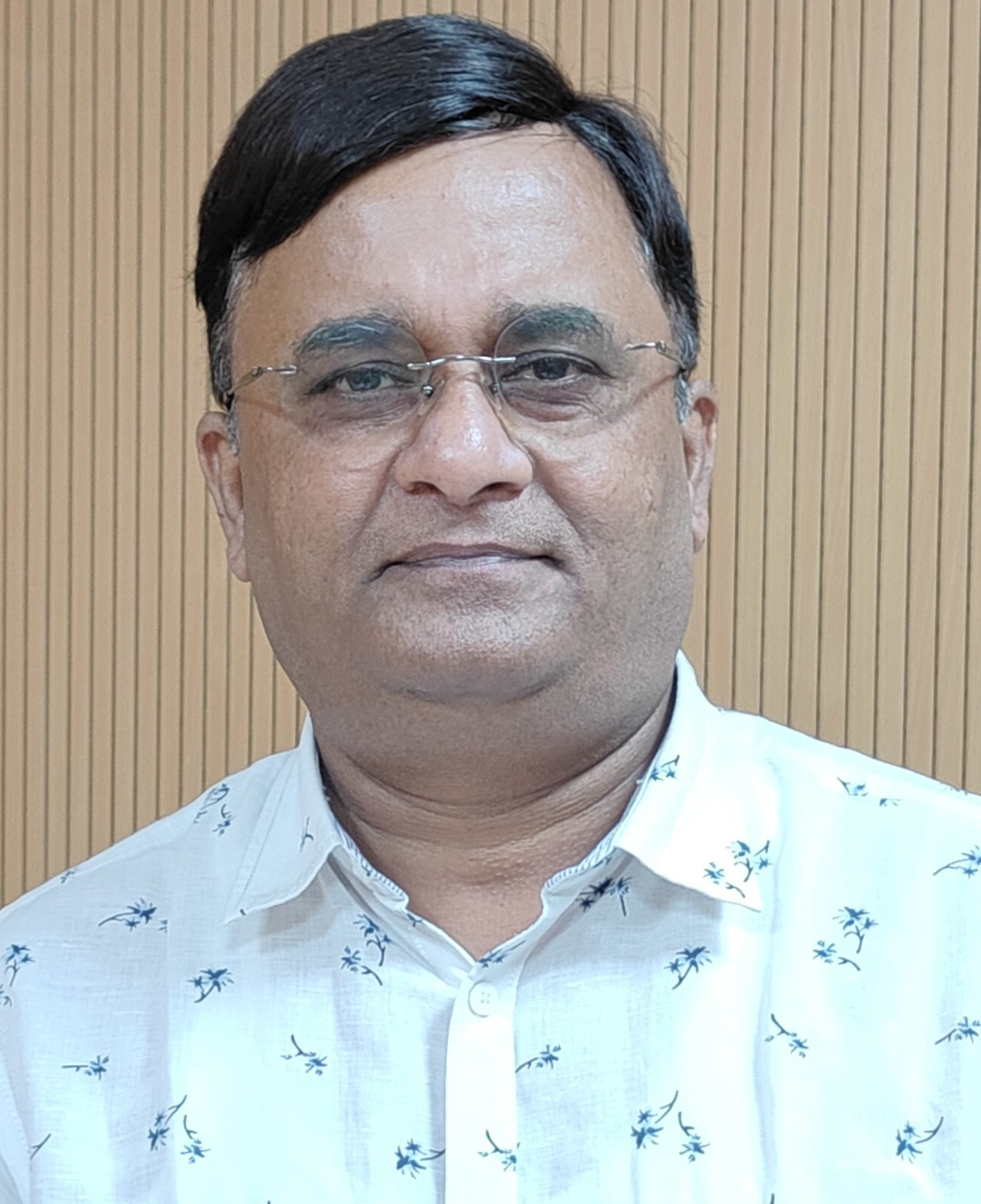
- Singh in November 2022

Academic background
- Education: University of Wuerzburg, Germany

Academic work
- Discipline: Biology
- Sub-discipline: Molecular virology
- Institutions: Banaras Hindu University

Sunit Kumar Singh is an Indian molecular virologist and professor of Molecular Immunology & Virology at the Institute of Medical Sciences, Banaras Hindu University. Currently, he is the director of the Dr. B R Ambedkar Center for Biomedical Research (ACBR), New Delhi.

== Education and career ==
Sunit Kumar Singh earned his PhD in 2005 from University of Wuerzburg in Germany. Prof. Singh has been a scientist at CSIR-Centre for Cellular and Molecular Biology (CCMB), Hyderabad from 2006 to 2014. In 2014, he joined the Banaras Hindu University (BHU), Varanasi, India. Prof. Singh has been Head of the Molecular Biology Unit, Institute of Medical Science, BHU, Varanasi for more than eight years. In addition, he has been the Professor Incharge of Center of Experimental Medicine & Surgery at the Institute of Medical Sciences, BHU, Varanasi for about five years Prior to these, Prof. Singh has worked in research roles at University of California, and School of Medicine, Yale University. In March 2023, Prof. Singh has been appointed as the Director of the Dr B R Ambedkar Center for Biomedical Research (ACBR), New Delhi in year 2023. In addition, Prof. Singh is also the Director of the Delhi School of Public Health (DSPH), Institution of Eminence, University of Delhi.

== Awards ==
Sunit K. Singh, received many awards and fellowships for his contribution in the area of virology. Prof. Singh has been quite active in disseminating the right information to the society during various virus outbreaks such as: SARS-CoV2 and Monkeypox outbreaks as a part of his public outreach activity.

- Elected Fellow of the National Academy of Medical Sciences (FAMS)
- Elected Fellow of the National Academy of Sciences India (FNASc)
- Elected Fellow of the Royal Society of Biology (FRSB)
- Elected Fellow of Indian Academy of Neuroscience (FIANS)
- Professor Sohail Ahmad Award' of Indian Academy of Biomedical Sciences
- ICMR- Prof. B. K. Aikat Oration Award for Tropical Diseases
- NAVBD-Molecular Biology Award
- ICMR-Chaturvedi Ghanshyam Das Jaigopal Memorial Award for Immunology
- ICMR-Dr. J. B Srivastav Memorial Oration Award for Virology

== Publications ==
Sunit K. Singh contributed to the area of neurovirology and inflammation biology. Prof. Singh has published his research findings in various international peer reviewed journals in the area of Molecular Virology. In addition to his original research publications in high impact factor peer reviewed journals, Prof. Singh has published many books in the area of Infectious Diseases such as: Neuroviral Infections- Vol-I and Vol-II, Viral Hemorrhagic Fevers, Human Respiratory Viral Infections by CRC Press/ Taylor & Francis group, USA, Neglected Tropical Diseases-South Asia, Defense Against Biological Attacks- Vol-I and Vol-II by Springer, USA;Viral Infections and Global Change, Human Emerging and Re-emerging Infectious Diseases- Vol-I and Vol-II by Wiley Blackwell Publications, USA. Prof. Singh has been associated with many reputed peer reviewed International journals as Deputy Editor, Section Editor and Editorial Board Member. Prof. Singh contributed immensely in understanding the molecular pathogenesis of different neurotropic viruses.
