= V. Balaji =

Dr. V. Balaji
- Born: 1958 (age 67–68); Delhi, India
- Genre: Hindustani classical music
- Occupation: violinist
- Instrument: violin

V. Balaji (born 1958) is an Indian violinist who performs both Hindustani classical music and Carnatic music. He recently retired as a professor of violin at Banaras Hindu University. He was the head and dean of the instrumental department.

== Early life and training ==
Balaji started playing violin at age three. By the age of nine, he was a professional musician. Dr. V. Balaji is a well-known artiste of Violin, Viola & Vocal, belonging to the family of musicians. His training in Carnatic Music began when he was only five years old under the watchful supervision of his grandfather Late Shri V. N. Krishna Iyengar and his father Late Shri V. K. Venkata Ramanujam. In 1975 Balaji began to study Hindustani Music at Banaras Hindu University under the tutelage of Professor (Smt) N.Rajam and received his doctoral degree in 1986.

== Performing career ==
He has also worked at All India Radio from 1983 to 1993 (Varanasi – Lucknow). Dr. Balaji's technique and innovations reflect near perfection. With guidance of his father and guru Sri. V. K. Venkata Ramanujam and Dr. Smt. N. Rajam, he was trained in the Gayaki Ang (vocal style). V. Balaji has performed across the globe and in numerous places throughout India.

Balaji won the Merit Scholarship for Securing First in both Bachelor's and master's degree B.H.U.in eighties. He is also the recipient of the prestigious National Scholarship Award and the Senior Fellowship Award – Department of Culture – Government of India – New Delhi.

== Awards ==
- Doyen of the music world – Sri Lanka
- Sangeet Natak Akademi Award UP,
- Chhatrapati Shivaji Award,
- Lifetime Achievement Award,
- I.S.C.L.O. Award,
- City Pushpa Award,
- Professional Excellency Award- Rotary Club,
- Amrita Mahotsava – Sanskar Bharti

== Titles ==
- Kashi Kala Ratna,
- Kashi Ratna Alankarna,
- Sangeeta SriRatnam,
- Sangeeta Bhushanam,
- Sangeeta Vibhuti,
- Sangeeta Sudhakara,
- Navarasa Vachaspati,
- Sangeeta Ratna

== Books contain a chapter about his life and works ==
- Ethnomusicology of the individual Vishnuchittan Balaji between Tradition and Innovativeness – Svanibor Pettan and Lasanthi Manaranjanie Kalinga Dona – Slovenia,
- The Singing Body: The Embodiment Process in the Transmission of Musical knowledge - A case study of Prof. V. Balaji - Asali
- Kashi ki Sangeet- Parampara sangeet jagat ko Kashi ka yogdaan- Pt. Kameshwarnath Mishra,
- Bhartiya saangeetik jagat mein Varanasi ka yogdaan- Dr. Renu Johari,
- Pt. Omkarnath ji Thakur evam unki shishya Parampara- Dr. Lavanya Kirti Singh 'Kavya',
- Strings Magazine, U.S.A. – Mr. James Wimmer,
- Prof. Karen Schlimp – Vienna University, Austria,
- Henrik Østergaard – violinist of Denmark,
- Krishna Tiwari – Switzerland.

== Documentary film ==
- A Documentary Film on him & his Friend cum Disciple Gilles Apap Teaching Method of Indian Music as well as Western Music along with many more Eminent Artist of Our Country as well as Western Musician in French Language "Renegade Fiddler" – Apap masala Directed by Max Jourdan, Production : Ideal audience, 6 Rue de I agent Bally 75009 Paris year 2002.
- "Raga – Ranga" – Surabhi – National Telecast – T.V. Serial – Mumbai.

== Book published ==
- "Swara Shringarawali" – 2010
- "Bhartiya Shastriya Sangeet Ki Do Dharaon Ka Ek Roopi Sanga"

== Discography ==
- Comparative Playing (Violin) of North Indian Music & Carnatic Music – Kavi Alexender, Waterlily Acoustics.
- "Raga" – Cassettes – Violin Solo North Indian Style of Indian Music – California.
- Rereleased in CD of Raga Yaman 2010
- Raga Bhimpalasi (Dedicated to Pt. Madan Mohan Malviya Ji on the occasion of 150th Malviya Jayanti 2010)
