= Sitaram Chaturvedi =

Indian scholar and writer (1907–2005)

- Born: January 27, 1907; Varanasi
- Died: February 17, 2005 (aged 98)
- Occupations: Scholar, educator

Pt. Sitaram Chaturvedi (27 January 1907 – 17 February 2005), also known as Acharya Sita Ram Chaturvedi, was an eminent Indian educator, dramatist and scholar of Hindi and Sanskrit language and literature.

== Biography ==
Chaturvedi was born in a renowned Brahmin family in Varanasi, India. His father Pandit Bhimsen Vedpathi Chaturvedi was a learned Sanskrit scholar of Vedic studies. He received his graduate and post-graduate education from Benaras Hindu University and later served as a professor at the university.

== Contributions ==
Chaturvedi wrote more than 70 plays in Hindi, Sanskrit and English, and directed, staged and acted in many others. He was an active participant in Bombay's Prithvi Theatre and was conferred the title of Abhinav Bharat. He also wrote more than 250 books on language, grammar, literature, plays, theatre etc.; edited the collected works of Kalidasa; and wrote biographies of Madan Mohan Malviya, Tulsidas and Vallabhacharya.

== Legacy ==
In 1968, Chaturvedi Ji founded the Bal Vishwavidyalaya (now known as the Bal Vidyalayay Madhyamik School) in Varanasi, with the aim of "multi-dimensional, progressive and character building personality within a child". The school was established to implement the educational precepts laid down by Chaturvedi, including introducing the child to crafts such as carpentry, pottery, spinning cotton yarn, doll making and weaving; and not having examinations till the fifth grades.

The 11-day theatre festival Natya Andolan, in Varanasi, is dedicated to the memory of Sitaram Chaturvedi.

Since Chaturvedi Ji has founded Akhil Bhartiya Vikram Parishad, Kashi under the guidance of Bharat Ratna Mahamana Pt. Madan Mohan Malviya Ji, it was pleasure that Mahamana Malviya had accepted to be first Chief of the said Parishad, involved in research activity of Hindi & Sanskrit literature. On the occasion of Sri Chaturvedi Ji Birth Centenory year 2008 Akhil Bhartiya Vikram Parishad, Kashi has started to honour one of any authority of literature, drama field, education, art & culture etc.with the honour of Srijan Manishi. Renowned poet Padmabhushan Dr. Gopal Dass Neeraj was the first recipient of Srijan Manishi in year 2008 and Mahant Yogi Sri 108 Chand Nath Ji of Abohar (Haryana) follower of Nath Samprdaya was the second recipient of Srijan Manishi in 2009. Poet Sri Kishan Saroj and Dr. Prakash Dwivedi are third and fourth recipient of Srijan Manishi for the year 2010 & 2011 respectively. In the year 2012 noted journalist and media person Sri Sharad Dutt was recipient of Srijan Manishi title. On 106th Birth Day of Acharya Ji a renowned Kathak Dancer Padma Bhushan Kum Uma Sharma was confirmed with Srijan Manishi as 6th recipient. A renowned Hindi & Maithil poet Dr Buddhi Nath Mishra is 7th recipient of Srijan Manishi on 27 Jan.'2014. On 27th Jan.'2015 renowned Hindi Poet Padmshree Ashok Charkradhar was confirmed with Srijan Manishi as 8th recipient.

== Awards ==
- Hindi gaurav samman, Uttar Pradesh Hindi Sansthan, 2001.
- Honorary Doctor of Letters (Vidya Vachasapati), Kameshwar Singh Darbhanga Sanskrit University, 2003.

== Selected bibliography ==
=== Hindi plays ===
- "Hans Mayur"
- Vasant
- Mangal Prabhat
- Bechara Keshawa
- Alka
- Poorva Kalidas
- Ajanta
- Shabree
- Vasant
- Siddhartha
- Padukabhishek
- Acharya Vishnugupta
- Aparadh
- Man Na Man
- Pap Ki Chhaya
- Vishwash
- Paras
- Vikramaditya
- Alka
- Yug Badal Raha Hai
- Anarkali
- Gundaa
- Aparadhee
- Jago Ek Bar Phir
- Padukabhishek
- Senapati Pushyamitra
- Dant Mudra Rakshas
- Som Nath
- Acharya Vishnu Gupta
- Shree Krishan Sudama
- Paras
- Atmatyag
- Tulsi Ka Varagya
- Yug Badal Raha Hai
- Valmiki
- AAdikavya Ka Janm
- Narad Moh
- Abhinav Natya Shastra
- Meera Bai
- Shree Krishna Doot
- Savitri Satyavan
- Sati Ka Tej
- Harsha Vardhan
- Rajiya
- Baglol Dulha
- Maulana Ka Nikah
- Meera Bai
- Shree Krishna Doot
- Bhishma Pratigyan
- Sita Ram
- Teen Totale
- AAp Kaun Hai
- Ghar Kiska
- Abhineta Banane Ki Dhun
- Sabka Baap
- Angulimal
- Mayavee
- Bhagwan Buddha
- AAdhi Raat
- Nayee Basti
- Udghatan
- Sabha Pati Ji
- Private Secretary
- Meri Maa Lag Gayee Aag ........
- Ladies First
- Makhee Choos
- Udhav Braj Me Aai Gaye
- Chandrika
- Vigyan Ka Dambha ya Machine Man
- Sharanagat
- Chetana
- Patthar Me Pran
- Pralobhan

=== English plays ===
- Satvir Baapu
- Mother Land

=== Jeewan Charitra ===
- BHAKTA JEEWAN LAL (1927)
- MAHAMANA MADAN MOHAN MALVIYA (1935) With Essays & lECTURE
- PANDIT BHAWANI BHIKH MISHRA (1936)
- MUNSHEEJI AUR UNKI PRATIBHA (1947)
- JAGADGURU SHREECHANDRACHARYA (1953)
- PANDIT VIDYADHAR JI GAUR (1954)
- SHREEMAD VALLBHACHARYA AUR UNKA PUSHTIMARG (1966) Hindi Sahitya Kutira, Varanasi.
- PANDIT MADAN MOHAN MALVIYA (1972) in Hindi Publications Division, Ministry of Information and Broadcasting, Government of India, New Delhi.
- PANDIT MADAN MOHAN MALVIYA (1973) in English Publications Division, Ministry of Information and Broadcasting, Government of India, New Delhi.
- MAHAKAVI SURDASS (1976)

=== Textbooks ===
- SANSKRIT – MANORAMA PART I
- SANSKRIT – MANORAMA PART II
- KABIR SANGRAH (1960)
- SUR – PAD – PANCHSHATI (1976)

Books

- Bhasha ki Shiksha (1940), Hindi Sahitya Kutir, Varanasi.
- Do paurāṇika nāṭaka (1952), (with Kanaiyalal Maneklal Munshi) Hindi Sahitya Kutir, Varanasi.
- Samiks̀a-Sāstra (1953), Vikram-Parisada, Banaras.
- Semikóa śāstra (1954), Akhila Bharatiya Vikramaparishat, Kasi
- Goswami Tulsidas (1956), Chowkhamba Vidyabhawan, Varanasi.
- Kāvyoṃ meṃ śailī aura kauśala (1956), Hindi Sahitya Kutir, Varanasi.
- Hindī-sāhitya-sarvasva; Hindī ke pratyeka adhyāpaka aura chātrakā śāśvata sakhā, (1956), Hindi Sahitya Kutir, Varanasi.
- Gangārāma (1958), Sadhubela Ashram, Varanasi.
- Vāgvijñāna : bhāshāśastra (A comprehensive study in linguistics) (1969), Chowkhamba Vidyabhavan, Varanasi.
- Bharat ke Udasin sant
- Rasa-taraṅginī (1968), (with Bhānudatta Miśra)
- Bhartiya Aur Europeae Shiksha Ka Itihaas
- The capital of Buddhism, Sarnath (1968), Orient Publishers, Varanasi.
- Sāhityānuśāsanaṃ (A critical work on the contents and art of literature and principles of their judicious application on various literary forms) (1970), Chowkhamba Sanskrit Series Office, Varanasi.
- Shiksha darshan (1970), Hindi Samiti, Suchna Vibhag, Lucknow.
- Madan Mohan Malaviya (1972), Publications Division, Ministry of Information and Broadcasting, Government of India, New Delhi.
- Abhinandanagrantha, Śrīkṛṣṇavallabhācā ryajīmahārāja (1981), (with Ema Bī Śāha) Śrīhariśaran- āgatimaṇḍala, Gujarat.
- Māruti caritamṛtam, (1996) (with Kunal, Kishor), Mahavir Mandir Prakashan, Patna.
- Kalidasa: Granthavali (Collected works of Kalidasa) (1944) (Ed.), Akhila Bharatiya Vikramaparishat, Kasi.

=== As an editor ===
Achrya Chaturvedi had served the Chief Editor of various News Paper & Magazines :

- Donn – English Monthly, Banaras Hindu University, 1927–28
- Sanatan Dharm – Hindi Weakly, Kashi, 1933–38
- Bhatiya Vidya – Hindi Monthly, Kashi, 1933–38
- Sanatan Dharm – Hindi Weakly, Bombay, 1947–49
- Patibha – Hindi Monthly, Bombay, 1948
- Sangram – Hindi Monthly, Bombay, 1949
- Basanti – Hindi Monthly, Kashi, 1950–1958
- Sankalp – Hindi Monthly, Calcutta, 1962–63

Apart from above Sri Chaturvadi Ji had honoured the post of President-Acharya : Bhartiya Patrkarita Mahavidyalya, Kashi during the year 1972–1974.

== See also ==
- List of Indian writers
