= Patrick Moutal =

French sitarist (born 1951)

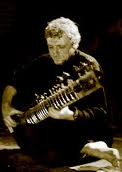
Patrick Moutal

Patrick Moutal is a French sitarist and musicologist. He has been teaching north Indian classical music at the Paris Conservatoire (CNSMDP) since 1984 (Jazz & Improvised Musics and Pedagogy dpts).

== Biography ==
Born in Lyon in 1951, he went to India at age 18 in order to study Hindustani classical music. He learned Hindi and settled in Banaras (Varanasi), where he stayed for 14 years. In 1970, he was admitted as a sitar student at the Faculty of Performing Arts of Banaras Hindu University. Under the guidance of Dr K.C. Gangrade and Pt Lalmani Misra, he completed the following degrees :
- Diploma 1973
- Bachelor's Degree with Gold Medal in 1976
- Master's Degree with Omkarnath Thakur Prize in 1978
- Master's Degree in French language in 1979
- Doctorate of Performance & Compositions in 1983
The year of his doctorate, he wrote two books in English about ragas (cf Bibliography).

From 1977 to 1983, he performed regularly at All India Radio.

On Maurice Fleuret's initiative, he went back to France in 1983 and started teaching at the Conservatoire National Supérieur de Musique et de Danse de Paris the following year. Since then, he has been dedicated to promoting Indian musical culture.

In 2000, he developed a website, Hindustani Raga Sangeet Online, devoted to Indian vocalists and instrumentalists through rare archives (cylinders, 78t, etc.).

== Honour ==
In 1983, Patrick Moutal was honored with the award of Chevalier dans l'Ordre des Arts et des Lettres by the Government of France.

== Bibliography ==
English :
Hindustani Gata-s Compilation. Instrumental themes in north Indian classical music (2012) Patrick Moutal Publisher ISBN 978-2-9541244-1-4
Comparative Study of Selected Hindustani Ragas. Volume 1 (2012) ISBN 978-2-9541244-2-1
Hindustani Raga Index. Major bibliographical references (descriptions, compositions, vistara-s) on north Indian Raga-s (2012) ISBN 978-2-9541244-3-8

French :
Hindustani Raga Sangita. Mécanismes de base de la musique de l'Inde du Nord, 2e édition revue et augmentée (2012) Patrick Moutal Éditeur ISBN 978-2-9541244-0-7

Articles :
"Sur la musique indienne et son enseignement", Musiques à prendre, CENAM, 1984
"La musique indienne : être confronté à l'infini. Interview de Patrick MOUTAL par Jean-Louis MAINGALON", Art Press No.95, septembre 1985
"La formation du musicien classique (créateur) de l'Inde. Quel enseignement musical pour demain?, 2-La formation du musicien professionnel", Actes et démarches. Les documents de l'Institut de Pédagogie Musicale, IPM, Villette, juin 1986
"L'interprétation dans la musique indienne", Analyse Musicale No.7, 2° trimestre 1987
"Quand ça improvise dans un carcan indien", Marsyas No.11, La crampe, septembre 1989
"L'écrit et la notation musicale : degré de représentativité", Analyse Musicale, Notation et analyse, No.24, juin 1991
"Musique indienne Porte de Pantin. Jean-Charles RICHARD", Marsyas, Apprentissage et traditions, No.31, septembre 1994

== Filmography ==
Georges Luneau, Fenêtre sur ..., 1979 (documentaire)
