= A. K. Narain =

Indian historian, numismatist and archaeologist (1925-2013)

- Born: Gaya, India
- Education: Banaras Hindu University, SOAS, University of London
- Known for: Research on the Indo-Greeks
- Awards: Holker; Guggenheim; Rockefeller; Ford Foundation; Dayaram Sahni Gold Medal; Chakravikrama Gold Medal
- Scientific career
- Fields: Archaeology, History, Numismatics, Indology
- Workplaces: University of Wisconsin–Madison, Banaras Hindu University

Awadh Kishore Narain (A. K. Narain, 28 May 1925 – 10 July 2013) was an Indian historian, numismatist and archaeologist, who published and lectured extensively on the subjects related to South and Central Asia. He was well known for his book, The Indo-Greeks, published by Clarendon Press in 1957, in which he discussed the thesis of British historian Sir William Woodthorpe Tarn.

== Background ==
Professor Narain was born in 1925 in Gaya in Bihar, India and died on 10 July 2013 in Varanasi, India, his home for most of his life. In 1947 he was awarded a Post Graduate Degree in Ancient Indian History, Culture (AIHC) and Archaeology from Banaras Hindu University (BHU) securing first position in the university and claiming the Dayaram Sahni Gold Medal. He earned his PhD degree from the School of Oriental and African Studies, University of London in 1954.

== Career ==
In his long association with his alma mater he held many academic and administrative positions at BHU. He was the Manindra Chandra Nandi Professor of AIHC & Archaeology; Head of the Department of AIHC & Archaeology; Principal, College of Indology; Dean, Faculty of Arts and Director of Archaeological Excavations and Explorations Programme of the university. In 1971, he was appointed Professor of History and South Asian Studies at the University of Wisconsin–Madison, USA, where he was also the Chair of the Buddhist Studies Program.

In 1987, Narain was granted early retirement from the University of Wisconsin–Madison and returned to India to found the Bhikkhu J. Kashyap Institute of Buddhist and Asian Studies of which he was the first Director. He remained Professor Emeritus of History and of Languages and Cultures of Asia at University of Wisconsin–Madison.

Narain was a Visiting Research Associate, School of Oriental and African Studies, London; Visiting professor, Macalester College, St. Paul, Minnesota; Visiting professor, Visvabharati, Shantiniketan; Fellow, Institute of Research in Humanities, University of Wisconsin; Fellow, Institute for Advanced Study, Princeton, and Visiting Fellow at Columbia University and New York University.

He was the recipient of many notable awards and research grants including the Holkar Fellowship, the Chakravikrama Gold Medal, a Rockefeller Grant, a Ford Foundation grant and a Guggenheim Fellowship. He was a Life Fellow of the Royal Numismatic Society, London and Honorary Fellow of the Royal Asiatic Society of Great Britain and Ireland. He was also an Honorary Member of the International Association of Buddhist studies.

Narain was also known for his extensive editorial contributions and many academic journals. He published over one hundred articles and reviews on topics related to history, polity, art, archaeology, anthropology, iconography, epigraphy and palaeography, numismatics and religion in various national and international journals.

Narain's later research was about the history of peoples of Central Asia who followed the Indo-Greeks, e.g. the Indo–Scythians, Indo–Parthians and the Yue Zhi-Kushans. He organised an international conference in London on the problem of the dating of Kanishka. He continued working on the history of these people, their movements and interactions in the context of South and Central Asia. At the time of his death, he was working on a multi-volume project entitled "From Kurush (Cyrus) to Kanishka", several volumes of which were ready for publication. Two other areas of Narain's interest were historiography and Buddhist studies.

== Recognition ==
- Campbell Gold Medal for Life Time Achievements in Ancient History, Numismatics and Archaeology by the Asiatic Society of Bombay, 2010
- Dayaram Sahni Gold Medal for First position in MA (1947), BHU
- Holkar Fellowship for higher studies in London (1952–54)
- Chakravikrama Gold Medal from the Numismatic Society of India
- Rockefeller grant for the International seminars and conference on Historical Writings on Asia, London (1956)
- Fellow, Institute for Advanced Study, Princeton
- Ford Foundation grant for work as Consultant for the editing of Special lectures on Indian Civilization at the University of Wisconsin
- Guggenheim Fellowship (1973–74); Recipient of research grants from the American Council of Learned Society, American Philosophical Association etc.
- Life Fellow of the Royal Numismatic Society, London
- Elected Honorary Fellow of the Royal Asiatic Society of Great Britain (1991)
- Visited the USSR for three months in 1965 as a guest of the Academy of Sciences and as Government of India Exchange Scholar. Visited USSR again in 1973 from USA.
- Visited Mongolia, Poland and Afghanistan as Govt. of India exchange scholar, (1965)
- Member of Justice Khosla Committee appointed by the Govt. of India to review the works of the three National Akademis of India (Sahitya Akademi, Lalit Kala Akademi and Sangeet-Natak Akademi) and the Indian Council of Cultural Relations (1969–70)
- Visited People's Republic of China in 1983 under the Distinguished Scholars' Exchange Program of the National Academy of Sciences, USA, at the invitation of the Academy of Social Sciences, China, and again in 1999 to study the "Mummies" discovered in Xinjiang
- Visited Turkey as specially invited guest on the occasion of their International Symposium on Turcology. Also nominated as one of the organising editors of Hindustan Turk Tarihi Arastirmalari, The Journal of Indo-Turcica (JIT), 2002

== Select publications ==
- The Indo-Greeks (The Clarendon Press, Oxford, 1957, 3rd OUP Reprint 1980)
- Coin-types of the Indo-Greek kings (NNM 1), published by Argonaut, Chicago
- Coin-types of Saka-Pahlava kings (NNM 3) Jointly with G.K. Jenkins
- Archaeological Excavations at Rajghat, (in 5 parts) (with excavation colleagues as co-authors)
- Studies in the History of Buddhism (Ed.) (D.K. Publishers, New Delhi, 1980)
- Studies in Pali and Buddhism (Ed.) (D.K. Publishers, new Delhi, 1979)
- Studies in Buddhist Art of South Asia (Ed.), (Kanak Publishers, New Delhi 1984)
- On the "First" Indo-Europeans : the Tokharian-Yuezhi and their Chinese homeland (Indiana University, Bloomington, 1987)
- The Greeks of Bactria and India (a Chapter in The Cambridge Ancient History, Vol. VIII), (Cambridge, 1989)
- Indo-Europeans in Inner Asia (a Chapter in The Cambridge History of Early Inner Asia), (Cambridge, 1990)
- "Approaches and Perspectives" being the Presidential address at the First Annual Conference of the Indian Society of Greek and Roman Studies 1991, Barelly 1992
- Dr.B.R. Ambedkar, Buddhism and Social Change (Ed. Jointly with D.C.Ahir), (D.K. Publishers, 1993)
- "Asia and the Twenty-first Century : Looking Back and Looking Ahead," being the Presidential Address at the First Conference of the Indian Congress of Asian and Pacific Studies held at Jawaharlal Nehru University, New Delhi, in 1995
- The Earliest Sakas of South Asia, being Dr. Kashi Prasad Jayaswal Memorial Lectures, 1993, Patna, 1998
- The Tokharians, a History without Nation-state Boundaries, being the Rajiv Gandhi Memorial Lectures, at the ICSSR-NERC, NEHU, Shillong
- The Date of the Historical Sakyamuni Buddha (editor) 2002
- Saka-Yavanam (a paper back reprint edition of his earlier works on the Indo-Greeks and Sakas) 2002
