= A. K. Chatterjee =

Indian philosopher (1925-2021)

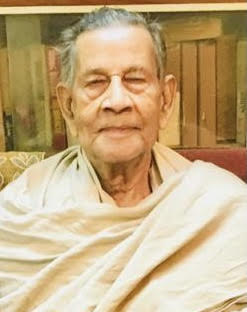
- Chatterjee on his 94th Birthday
- Born: 27 November 1925; Allahabad
- Died: 21 April 2021 (aged 95)
- Occupation: Professor of Philosophy
- Awards: Indian Council of Philosophical Research (ICPR) - Lifetime Achievement Award in 2014

Education
- Education: Banaras Hindu University

Ashok Kumar Chatterjee (27 November 1925 – 21 April 2021) was an Indian philosopher and Buddhist scholar who taught philosophy at the Banaras Hindu University, Varanasi. He is best known for his book The Yogãcāra Idealism, published in 1962, in which he interpreted Yogacara-Vijnanavada school of Buddhism.

== Biography ==
Ashok Kumar Chatterjee was born in Allahabad to a Bengali Brahmin family. He pursued his education under his Guruji professor T. R. V. Murti of Banaras Hindu University. He attended the Central Hindu School of Banaras Hindu University throughout high school and intermediate studies, and then continued his B.A., M.A., and Ph.D. in philosophy. He received a French and German diploma. He is known to have frequently engaged in philosophical discussions with leading figures in Indian philosophy like Kalidas Bhattacharya. He was a Sayajirao Gaekwad Fellow from 1947 to 1950 in the Department of Philosophy, Banaras Hindu University.

== Career ==
Chatterjee was a professor from 1950 to 1963 at Agra University and became the head of the philosophy department. After establishing the Centre of Advanced Study in Philosophy at Banaras Hindu University, he joined the university in 1963 and retired in 1985 as the professor and the head of the Department of Philosophy and Religion.

The Indian Council of Philosophical Research, New Delhi, honoured him with the National Lectureship in 1992 and Lifetime Achievement Award in 2014. He was the president of the Metaphysics and Epistemology Section of the 45th Session of the Indian Philosophical Congress in 1971 (held at Osmania University, Hyderabad).

In 2008, Chatterjee's presented a Festschrift in honour of him.

== Publications ==
David J. Kalupahana wrote about Chatterjee's The Yogācāra Idealism: "Ashok Kumar Chatterjee has produced one of the few detailed and significant treatments of Yogācāra. Unfortunately, his work 'The Yogācāra Idealism' has not enjoyed the same publicity as his teacher's work (T. R. V. Murti's The Central Philosophy of Buddhism). Yet, it is no way second to Murti's treatment of Mādhyamika philosophy."

== Books ==
- The Yogācāra Idealism (1962)
- Readings on Yogācāra Buddhism (1971)
- Facets of Buddhist Thought (1973)
- Sākșī in Vedānta (1978)
