= Adya Prasad Pandey =

Indian Academics Administrator

- आद्या प्रसाद पाण्डेय
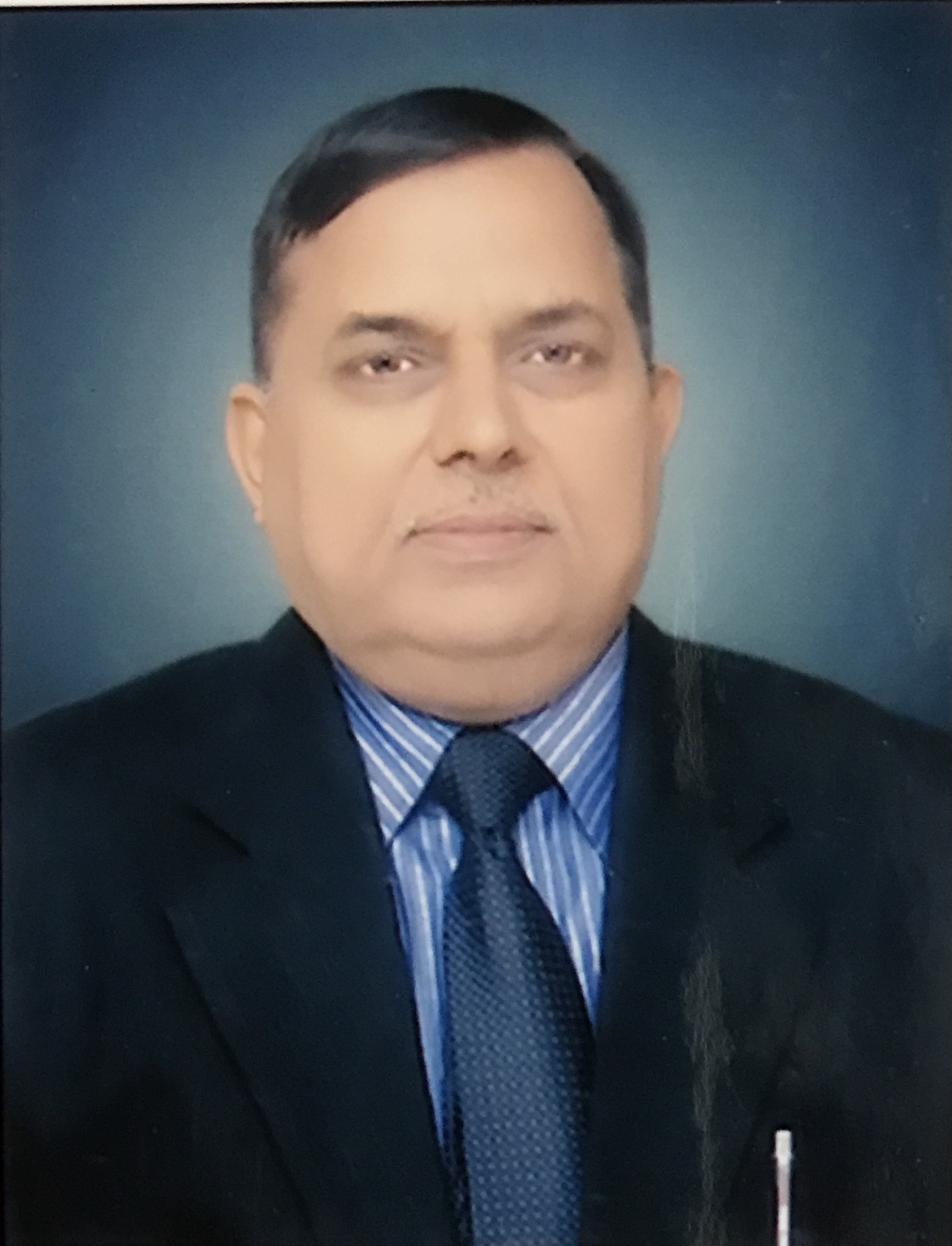
- Adya Prasad Pandey

Vice-Chancellor of University of Manipur
- In office 26 October 2016 – 20 June 2020
- Appointed by: Pranab Mukharjee
- Preceded by: Hidangmayum Nandakumar Sarma
- Succeeded by: Naorem Lokendra Singh

Personal details
- Citizenship: India
- Education: Banaras Hindu University
- Occupation: Economist

Academic work
- Discipline: Economics
- Institutions: Director of National Small Industries Corporation; Former Vice Chancellor of Manipur University

Adya Prasad Pandey is an Indian economist, professor, and state minister cadre in the government of Manipur. He previously served as the vice chancellor of Manipur University. Currently, he is the national president of the Indian Economic Association, as well as the independent director at the National Small Industries Corporation (NSIC).

Pandey is a full-time professor at the Banaras Hindu University. He is also a member of the Executive Council of Banaras Hindu University.

== Early life and education ==
Pandey is a graduate of Banaras Hindu University Varanasi, earning BSc, MBA and MA degrees from the institution. He started his teaching career at the same university during 1979.

He then studied for a PhD degree in economics, also at Banaras Hindu University, under the supervision of P.K. Bhargava. His PhD subject was the Uttar Pradesh Financial Corporation, and the findings of the PhD were used by that corporation to improve the financial performance of the business.

Professor Pandey was subsequently promoted to Head of the Department of Economics at Banaras Hindu University, and held additional responsibilities at the institution, co-ordinating the National Service Scheme and chairing the university games. Currently Professor Pandey is Board of Governor of IIT BHU, and Executive Council Member of Prestigious Banaras Hindu University.
