= Arvind Mohan Kayastha =

Indian scientist (born 1960)

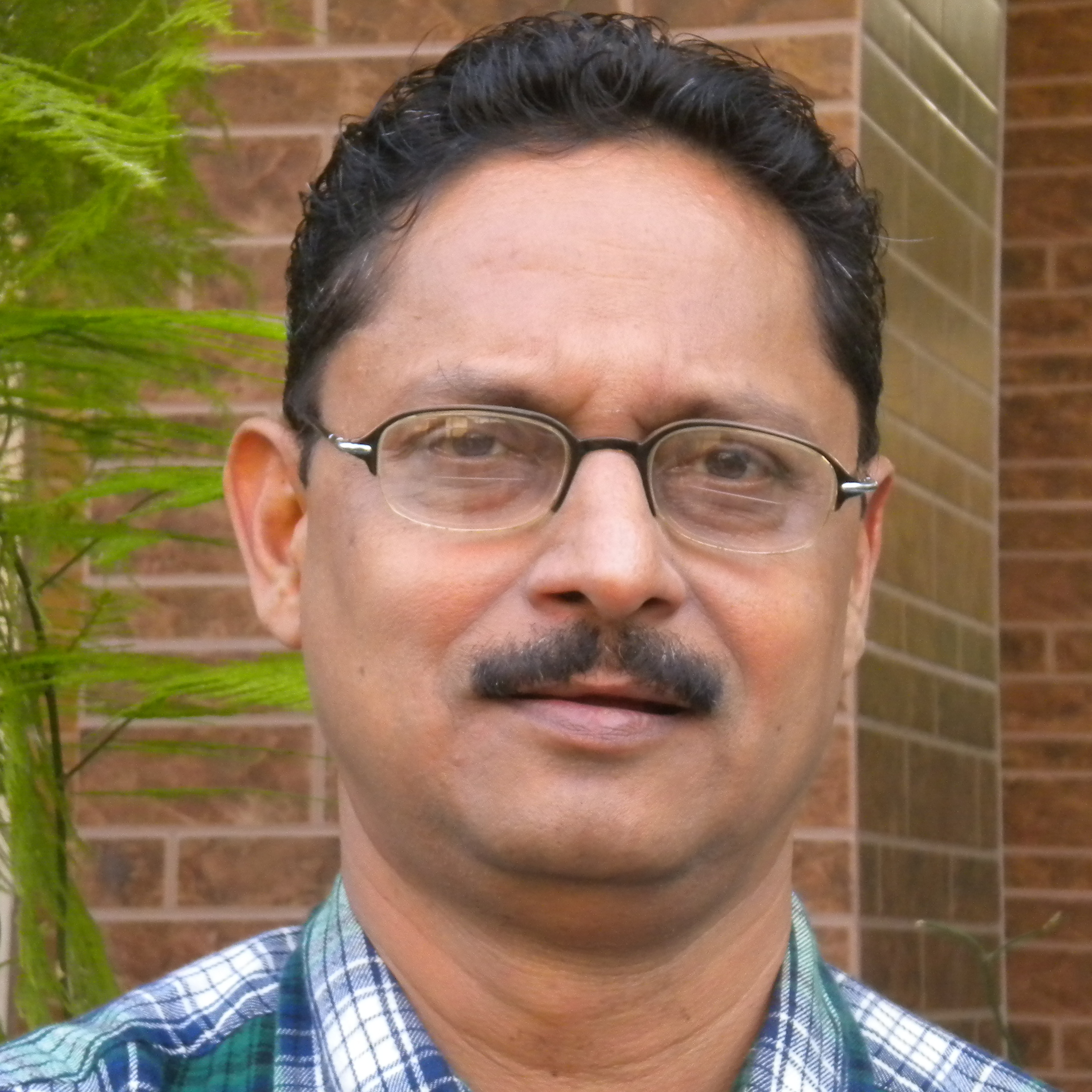
- Born: 1 August 1960 (age 66); Dharamsala, Himachal Pradesh, India
- Education: Banaras Hindu University (B.Sc., M.Sc., and Ph.D.)
- Scientific career
- Workplaces: School of Biotechnology, Banaras Hindu University
- Doctoral advisor: O. P. Malhotra

Arvind Mohan Kayastha (Hindi: अरविन्द मोहन कायस्थ) (born 1 August 1960) is an Indian biologist in the field of plant biochemistry and enzyme technology. He is a Professor at the School of Biotechnology, Banaras Hindu University and was the coordinator of the School of Biotechnology. He is a fellow of National Academy of Sciences, India, National Academy of Agricultural Sciences, and National Academy of Medical Sciences.

== Education and career ==
Kayastha earned his B.Sc. in 1979 and his M.Sc. (biochemistry) in 1982 from Banaras Hindu University. He earned a Ph.D. in enzymology from Banaras Hindu University in 1988. Following his Ph.D., Kayastha was a postdoctoral associate at the National Institutes of Health and at the University of California, Riverside.

Kayastha has published about 167 research articles in peer reviewed journals. He specializes in plant biochemistry and enzyme technology. He has been on the editorial boards of several journals in related fields, including the Journal of Plant Biochemistry and Biotechnology published by Springer Science+Business Media.
