= Byomakesh Mohanty =

Indian artist

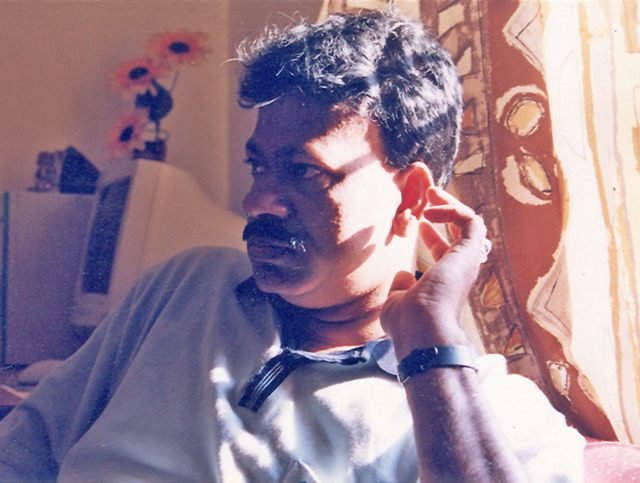
- Byomakesh Mohanty
- Born: 17 November 1957; Cuttack, Orissa, India
- Died: 14 June 2010 (aged 52); India
- Education: Banaras Hindu University
- Known for: Painting, drawing

Byomakesh Mohanty (17 November 1957, Cuttack, Orissa, India – 14 June 2010) was an Indian artist and academic. After completing his science studies and graduating from Utkal University, Bhubaneswar, Orissa, he joined as a faculty of visual arts at Banaras Hindu University.

== Career ==
After completion of his studies he devoted all his time and energy in pursuing Visual Art in the country and received several awards and honors at the national and international level.

He was convenor of Indo-Japan and Indo-France Art exhibitions organized in Orissa, and Professor at B.K College of Art and Craft till 2010. He guided the scholars after receiving a national scholarship. He was appointed as a Visualiser for national monuments in Orissa. Lastly, he joined Orissa State Lalit Kala Akademi as secretary.

Prof. Byomakesh Mohanty memorial award is given by Artists’ Association of Orissa (AAO) in the name of Byomakesh to the artists for their significant contribution.

== Exhibitions ==
- Jehangir Art Gallery in Mumbai
- ABC Art Gallery, Banaras
- Academy of Fine Arts, Kolkata
- Visva Bharati University at Santiniketan
- Banaras Hindu University at Varanasi
- Regional Art Centre At Madras, Lucknow and Bhubaneshwar
- National Gallery of Modern Art, New Delhi
- Lalit Kala Akademi at Rabindra Bhavan New Delhi
- Orissa State Museum Bhubaneshwar
- Regional Centre at Lucknow and Bhubaneshwar
- State Governor's House at Bhubaneshwar
- Indian Airlines at Mumbai
- Düsseldorf Art Gallery, Germany
- National Museum of France, Paris.

== Awards ==
- Three time recipient of State Award by Orissa Lalit Kala Akademi
- All India Award by U.P State Lalit Kala Akademi
- "Orissa Prativa Samman" by Indo Soviet Cultural Society (I.S.C.U.S.)
- Vice Chancellor Award at Banaras Hindu University.
