= Jamuna Sharan Singh =

Indian ecologist (born 1941)

- Born: 26 December 1941 (age 84); Allahabad, Uttar Pradesh, India
- Education: University of Allahabad; Banaras Hindu University
- Known for: Ecosystems analysis; Ecophysiology
- Awards: 1999 IBS Dr. Birbal Sahni Gold Medal; 1999 INSA Professor S. B. Saksena Memorial Medal; 1980 Shanti Swarup Bhatnagar Prize; 1984 Pitamber Pant Award; 1985 UGC Pranavanand Award; 2005 AWA Life Time Achievement Award
- Scientific career
- Fields: Ecology
- Workplaces: Kurukshetra University; Colorado State University; School of Planning and Architecture; Kumaun University; Banaras Hindu University
- Doctoral advisor: Ramdeo Mishra; Kailsh C. Misra

Jamuna Sharan Singh (born 1941) is an Indian ecologist, academic and a former professor of botany and ecological sciences at Banaras Hindu University. He is known for his studies on the grassland ecosystems which are reported to have assisted in the better management of tropical grasslands. He is an elected fellow of the Indian National Science Academy, Indian Academy of Sciences, The World Academy of Sciences and the National Academy of Sciences, India. The Council of Scientific and Industrial Research, the apex agency of the Government of India for scientific research, awarded him the Shanti Swarup Bhatnagar Prize for Science and Technology, one of the highest Indian science awards, in 1980, for his contributions to biological sciences.

== Biography ==
Born on the Boxing Day of 1941 in Allahabad in the Indian state of Uttar Pradesh to Vishwambher Sharan Singh -Chandrakali Devi couple, Jamuna Sharan Singh graduated in science from the University of Allahabad in 1957 and continued at the same institution to complete his master's degree in 1959, standing first in the university in both the examinations. He would later secure a doctoral degree (PhD) in 1967 from Banaras Hindu University for his thesis, Dynamics of grassland vegetation , under the guidance of noted ecologists, Ramdeo Misra and Kailash C. Misra. He started his career in 1968 by joining Kurukshetra University as a lecturer and continued at the university till 1975, but took a break to work as a visiting scientist at Natural Resource Ecology Laboratory of Colorado State University during 1971–74.

On his return from the US in 1974, Singh resumed his service at Kurukshetra University but moved, a year later, to School of Planning and Architecture, New Delhi as a reader at the department of Landscape Architecture and after one year's service, he moved to Kumaon University, Nainital as a reader in 1976. His tenure at Nainital lasted till 1986 and during this period, he had a second stint at Colorado State University from 1981 to 1982. His move to Banaras Hindu University in 1984 was as a professor where he held such positions as Head of the Department from 1991 to 1993 and as the Coordinator of the Centre of Advanced Study in Botany from 1997 till his superannuation from service in 2003. In between, he had a third stint at Colorado State University at the Department of Rangeland Ecosystem Science during 1993–94 as Visiting Professor. Post his retirement, he continued his association with the university as an emeritus professor.

Singh is married to Tripura and the couple has two sons and two daughters. The family lives in Varanasi.

== Legacy ==
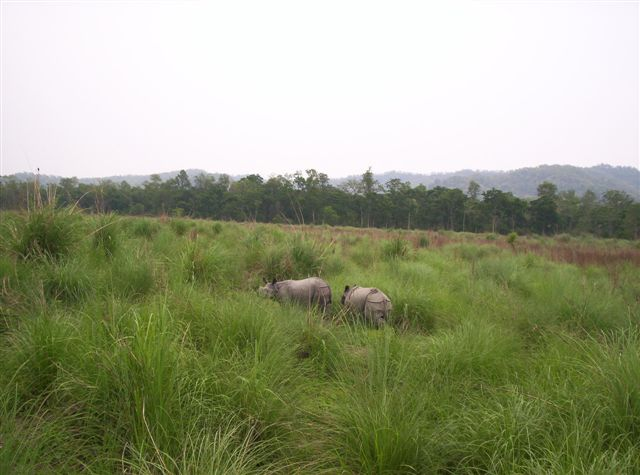
Chitwan National Park - a tropical grassland

Singh's principal subject of study was grassland ecosystems and his studies included various types of grasslands including tropical and temperate grasslands, oak and pine forests, tropical dry forests and alpine grasslands with reference to their biomass relations, eco-physiology, energy flow, diversity and mathematical modelling. His studies are reported to have widened our understanding of the development, dynamics and disruption of natural ecosystems and assisted in developing scientific methodologies for their protection, management and conservation. He is credited with the compilation of comprehensive data on different ecosystems and he is known to have proposed new eco-management strategies and resource study protocols. His researches have been documented by way of 405 articles, ResearchGate, an online repository of scientific articles has listed 300 of them. Besides, he has published five books viz. Tropical Ecosystems: Ecology and Management, Grassland vegetation: its structure, function, utilization and management, Forests of Himalaya: Structure, Functioning, and Impact of Man, Research Methods in Plant Ecology. and Science and Rural Development in Mountains., Ecology, environmental Science and conservation (author1=J S Singh, author 2+S P Singh, author 3+ S R Gupta ( publisher= S. Chand and Co. Pvt Ltd

Singh, a former chairman of the Rerearch Council of G. B. Pant National Institute of Himalayan Environment and Sustainable Development, chaired the Governing Body of Birbal Sahni Institute of Palaeobotany from 2003 to 2006. He is a former member of the Special Committee for the International Geosphere-Biosphere Programme, Interdisciplinary Committee of the World Cultural Council, International Association for Vegetation Science, International Centre for Integrated Mountain Development (ICIMOD), International Council for Science (ICSU) and the council of the Indian National Science Academy. He served the National Institute of Ecology as its Secretary General from 1982 to 1984, as the Vice President from 1994 to 1996 and as its President from 1997 to 1999. He is a former secretary of the International Society for Tropical Ecology and has held the post of the chief editor of its journal, Tropical Ecology. He was also associated with many other science journals such as Oecologia Montana, Reclamation and Revegetation Research of Elsevier, Journal of Vegetation Science, Applied Vegetation Science and Journal of Plant Ecology and has guided 43 doctoral scholars in their researches.

== Awards and honors ==
Singh, who was elected as a fellow by the Indian National Science Academy in 1984, was elected by the Indian Academy of Sciences as their fellow in 1985. The National Academy of Sciences, India followed suit in 1988 and he became a fellow of The World Academy of Sciences in 2002. He is also a fellow of the International Society for Tropical Ecology, National Institute of Ecology, Indian Range Management Society, Central Himalayan Environment Association and the Academy of Forest and Environmental Sciences and a member of the Ecological Society of America, International Association for Vegetation Science, Society for Scientific Values, Current Science Association, Indian Science Congress Association and Indian Botanical Society. He is a life member of the Indian Science Congress and presided the environmental sciences section of the 2004 congress held in Chandigarh.

The Council of Scientific and Industrial Research awarded Singh the Shanti Swarup Bhatnagar Prize, one of the highest Indian science awards, in 1980. He was selected for the Pitamber Pant National Environment Fellowship of the Ministry of Environment, Forest and Climate Change in 1984 and the University Grants Commission of India chose him for the Pranavanand Saraswati Award in 1985. The Indian Botanical Society awarded him the Birbal Sahni Gold Medal in 1999 and he received Prof. S. B. Saksena Memorial Medal of the Indian National Science Academy the same year. He has won the Honor of Distinction of the Society for Protection of Environment and Sustainable Development (2003) and the Lifetime Achievement Award of the AWA (2005) and has delivered several award orations including the 2009 Biodiversity Lecture Award of the National Academy of Sciences, India and the 2010 Bishambher Nath Chopra Lecture of the Indian National Science Academy. His biography is included in a number of biographical reference publications including Who's Who in India of 1986. Business Press, Mumbai (1986), Marquis Who's Who in the World (9th Edition), Reference Asia: Asia's Who's Who of Men and Women of Achievement of Rifacimento International (1989), India Who's Who of INFA Publications, New Delhi (1990–91), and Who's Who in International Affairs of Europa Publications, London.

== Selected bibliography ==
- Satish Chandra Pāṇḍeya; Gopal Singh Puri; Jamuna Sharan Singh (1968). Research methods in plant ecology. Asia Pub. House.
- P. S. Yadava; Jamuna Sharan Singh (1977). Grassland vegetation: its structure, function, utilization and management. Today and Tomorrow's Printers & Publishers.
- P. S. Yadava, Jamuna Sharan Singh (1977). "Grassland vegetation". Solarmia.
- Jamuna Sharan Singh; Surendra P. Singh; Sampat Pal Singh, C. Shastri (1981). Science and Rural Development in Mountains: Ecological, Socio- Economical, and Technological Aspects. Gyanodaya Prakashan.
- K. P. Singh; Jamuna Sharan Singh (1992). Tropical Ecosystems: Ecology and Management. Wiley Eastern. ISBN 978-81-224-0365-7.
- Jamuna Sharan Singh; Surendra P. Singh (1992). Forests of Himalaya: Structure, Functioning, and Impact of Man. Gyanodaya Prakashan. ISBN 978-81-85097-25-1.
- J. S. Singh, A. K. Kashyap (July 2007). "Contrasting pattern of methanotrophs in dry tropical forest soils: Effect of soil nitrogen, carbon and moisture". Microbiological Research. 162 (3): 276–283. doi:10.1016/j.micres.2006.06.008. PMID 16875809.

== See also ==
- Ecosystem
- Tropical and subtropical grasslands, savannas, and shrublands
