= B.C. Nirmal =

Prof. BC Nirmal Legal Scholar Former Dean, Faculty of Law, Banaras Hindu University, India AND Former Vice-Chancellor, National University of Study and Research in Law, Ranchi, India
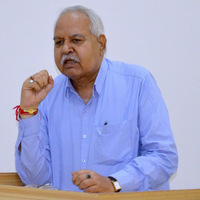
- Born: बी सी निर्मल; 19 February 1952 (age 74)
- Citizenship: Indian
- Education: B.Sc., LL.M., Ph.D.
- Alma mater: Banaras Hindu University
- Occupations: Professor of Law specialised in International law, Human rights
- Known for: International Law
- Notable work: The Right to Self-Determination in International Law (Deep & Deep Publications, New Delhi, 1999), Contemporary Issues in International Law (Springer,2019), Legal Research and Methodology: Perspectives, Process and Practice(Satyam,2019), Combating Corruption: Black Money and Money Laundering Issues & Challenges Ahead(Satyam,2018)
- Honours: Awarded विधिवाचस्पति on 25th June, 2024 by हिंदी साहित्य सम्मलेन, प्रयाग for promoting the knowledge of law through Hindi language. Lifetime Achievement Award by the Indian Society of International Law, New Delhi in 2020. Life Time Achievement Award by All India Law Teachers Congress (2009) for contribution to the field of International Humanitarian Law.

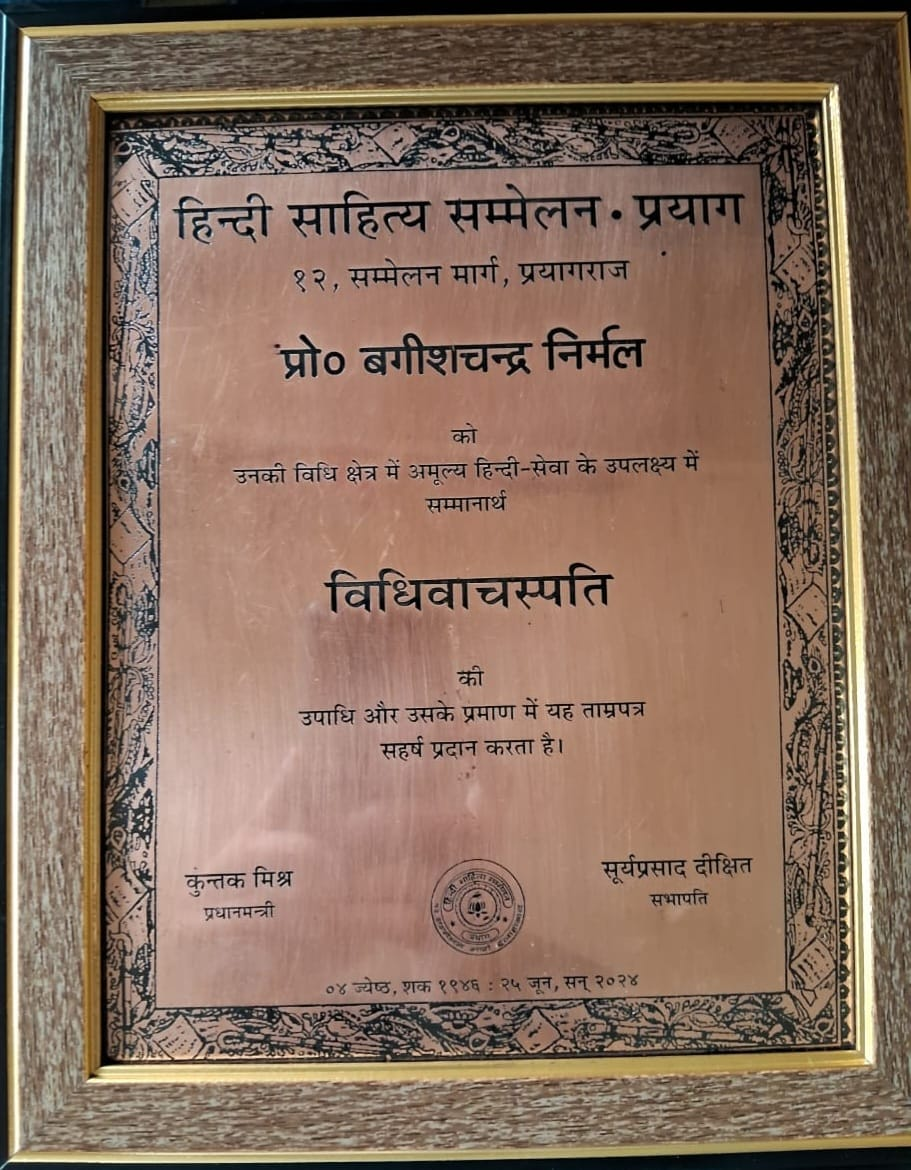
विधिवाचस्पति पुरस्कार

B. C. Nirmal (Hindi: बी सी निर्मल) born 19 February 1952, is an Indian Professor of Law specialised in International law, Human rights. He has 42 years teaching and research experience in law, and has played a role in the overall development of the BHU Law School. He was vice chancellor at National University of Study and Research in Law, Ranchi, Jharkhand. Before that, he was Head and Dean of Law School, Banaras Hindu University (Varanasi). He has also been the Vice-President of Indian Society of International Law (ISIL, New Delhi), Vice President of All India Law Teachers Congress, Member of Executive Council, Indian Society of International Law, New Delhi and Member of Governing Council of Indian Law Institute, New Delhi. He has also been a Member of the Academic Council of Banaras Hindu University, Varanasi, Deen Dayal University, Gorakhpur. Before he took on the post of vice chancellor, he was a member of the Academic Council and honorary professor at Gujarat National Law University, Gujarat. He has written on Public International Law, Human Rights, Humanitarian Law, Refugee Law, International Space Law, Intellectual Property Law, International Institutional Law, International Environmental Law and Legal Education.

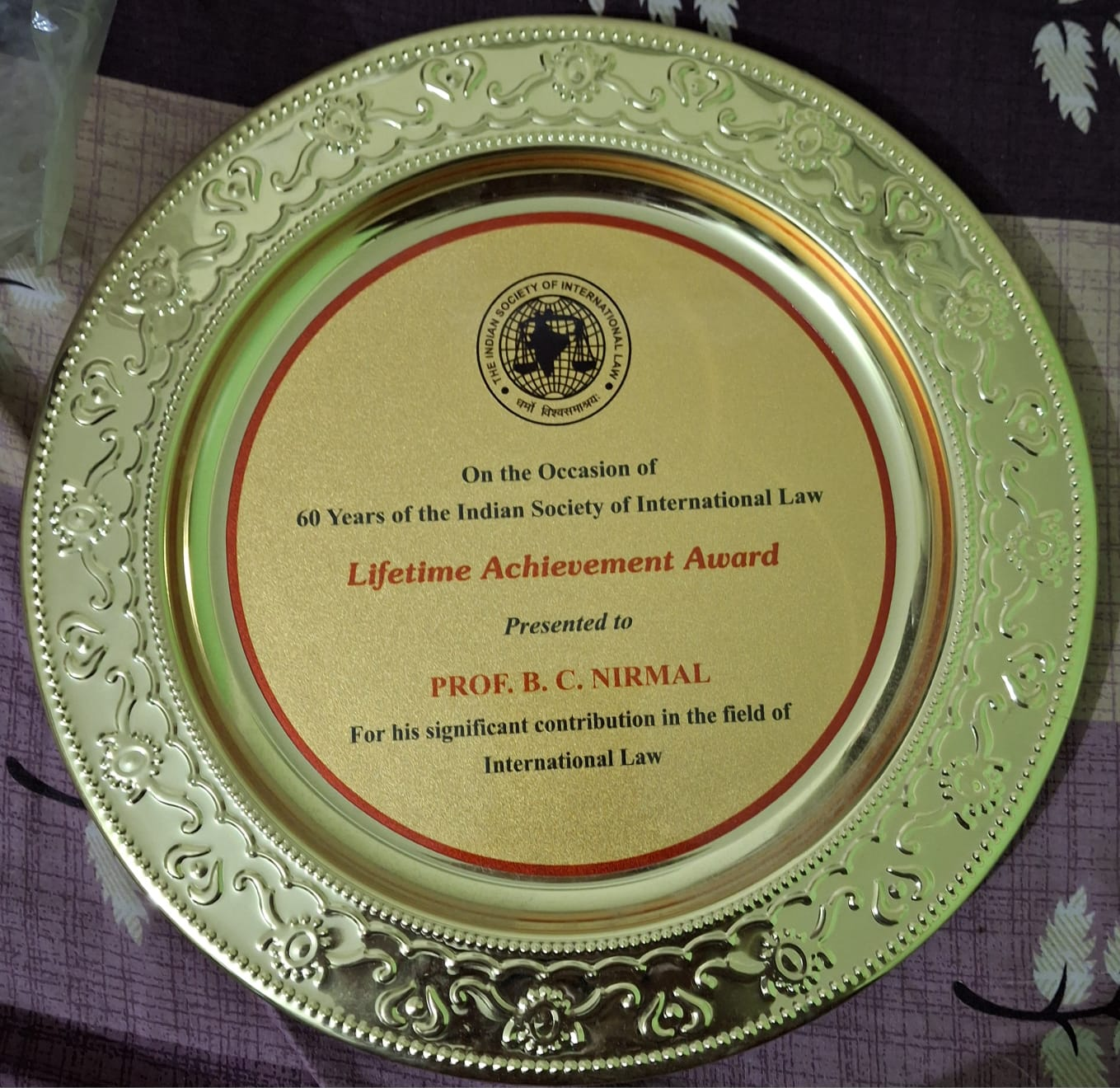
ISIL Lifetime achievement award

== Career ==
In 2012 Nirmal was appointed Dean of the Faculty of Law of the Banaras Hindu University for a term of 3 years. Under his leadership, the law school held its first international conference on international environmental law, commercial law, law of information technology and legal studies and gathered 400 delegates came from 18 states and 7 countries. During his tenure as Dean, Prof. Nirmal introduced new courses in the BHU Law School, notably five year course of BALLB and one year LL.M. besides 8 diploma courses. Prof. Nirmal created the BHU Law School Newsletter , a quarterly which he is editor. And, he has been Executive Editor of Banaras law Journal, and Editor-in-Chief of the same journal from 2012-2014. He digitised the Banaras Law Journal making all the volume available online. He is the founder of NUSRL Journal of Law and Policy.

In 2014, was appointed by the Jharkhand High Court Vice Chancellor at National University of Study and Research in Law, Ranchi, Jharkhand.

== Awards ==
He has been honored with a Lifetime achievement award by the Indian Society of International Law, New Delhi for his contribution to the field of law and higher education and has been felicitated by the All Indian Law Teachers Association, Kashi Vidwat Parishad for his contribution to the fields of humanitarian law and human rights(2009). He has been awarded an Observer Lifetime Achievement Award and award of Ashray Sansthan for his contribution in the field of higher education. State of Jharkhand felicitated him for his contribution in the field of Hindi. The title of Professor of Eminence Humanitarian Law was conferred upon him by the Lex Concilium Foundation.

== Lectures ==
1. Lectures on "International Criminal Law", Xiamin Academy of International Law, 4–11 July 2010
2. Nine lectures on "International Criminal Law" at the Asian Academy of International Law(2010)
3. Lecture on "Optional Protocol to the International Covenant on Economic, Social and Cultural Rights", Law School, Banaras Hindu University, 2010.
4. "Sovereignty in International Law" at South Asian Conference on International and Comparative Law, July 7, 2006, Taipei.

== Publications ==
=== Books ===
- The right to self-determination in international law: evolution, U.N. law and practice, new dimensions, Deep & Deep Publications, 1999, 2007,
- With Ramaa Prasad Dhokalia, International Court in Transition: Essays in Memory of Professor Dharma Pratap, Foreword by Ranganath Misra, Chugh Publications, Allahabad, 1994,
- The Right of Self-Determination of the Tibetan People. Approaches and Modalities, in Tibetan people's right of self-determination: report of the Workshop on Self-determination of the Tibetan People: Legitimacy of Tibet's Case 1994/1996, India, Tibetan Parliamentary and Policy Research Centre, 1996
- Aadhunik Antarrashtriya Vidhi: EK Parichay, Indian Society of International Law under a project sponsored by the Ministry of Laws Justice, 1998
- Contemporary Issues in International Law, Springer, 2019
- Legal Research and Methodology : Perspectives, Process and Practice, Satyam Law International, 2019
- Combating Corruption : Black Money and Money Laundering Issues & Challenges Ahead, Satyam Law International, 2018
- Translated Navodit Rajya and Antarrashtriya Vidhi (New States and International Law (R.P. Anand) (Foreword, Dr. Nagendra Singh, the then President, International Court of Justice, the Hague, (Indian Society of International Law, New Delhi, 1988)

=== Research Projects ===
- Hindi translation of R.P. Anand's New States and International Law (Published in 1988 by the Indian Society of International Law)
- Human Right's Approach to Sustainable Development. UGC – Minor Research Project.
- Heritage Conservation and the Law, Law School under a scheme sponsored by the Ministry of Environmental and Forest. (2003).
- Hague Conventions on the Recognition of Validity of Marriages of Divorce and Decisions Relating to Maintenance Obligations (ISIL, New Delhi, Financed and Sponsored by the Ministry of External Affairs, 2003).

=== Articles ===
- Human rights Aspects of Abortion; International Review of Contemporary Law (Brussels 1985) pp. 73–90 (Published in English, French and Spanish).
- The Most-Favoured Nation Clause in North-South Trade Relations, International Review of Contemporary Law (1982), 17-1134.
- ‘Implementation of the Biological Weapons Convention: Indian State Practice’, ISIL Yearbook of International Humanitarian and Refugee Law, 2011
- Tracking the Problems of Space Debris: Needs for a Legal Frameworks’, IJIL, 2013.
- The International Criminal Court's Trust Fund for Victims: Challenges and Opportunities’, IJIL, 51 (4). Year Book of International Humanitarian and Refugee Law, (2011).pp. 527–549.
- Legal Regulation of Remote Sensing’. Conference Papers of the Seventh International Conference on Legal Regime of Sea, Antarctica, Air and Space (15-17 Jan 2010, New Delhi), p. 175-206. Also in revised version in 54 (4), JILI (2012)
- UNHCR After Six Decades and Beyond, ISIL Yearbook of International Humanitarian and Refugee Law, 2010. pp. 182–243.
