= Dr. Sarvepalli Radhakrishnan Rajasthan Ayurved University =

Ayurved University in Rajasthan, India

Coordinates: 26.4516653°N 73.1054818°E

- Type: Public
- Established: 2003; 23 years ago
- Affiliations: UGC
- Chancellor: Governor of Rajasthan
- Vice-Chancellor: Govind Sahay Shukla
- Location: Jodhpur, Rajasthan, India
- Campus: Urban
- Website: dsrrauexam.org

Dr. Sarvepalli Radhakrishnan Rajasthan Ayurved University, formerly Rajasthan Ayurved University, is an Ayurved university in the state of Rajasthan, India. The university situated in Jodhpur was founded on 24 May 2003.

This university affiliates about 42 colleges/institutions. It conducts a joint entrance test for admission into its various degree programs. The university's constituent colleges includes ayurved, homoeopathic, unani, yoga and naturopathy colleges. The campus is located at Karwar, Jodhpur on Jodhpur-Nagaur highway on over 322 acres (1.30 km^{2}).

Abhimanyu Kumar was appointed vice chancellor in 2019.

Ayurvedic medicine and homeopathy are considered pseudoscientific because their premises are not based on science.

== See also ==
- Arid Forest Research Institute (AFRI) Jodhpur
