= Gangadhar J. Sanjayan =

Indian bio organic chemist

- Born: 1 June 1968 (age 58); Kerala, India
- Education: National Chemical Laboratory
- Known for: Synthesis of designer peptide/protein mimetics and hetero-foldamers
- Awards: 2014 UoP Bhagyatara Award; 2013 CRSI Bronze Medal; 2013 OPPI Award; 2012 Shanti Swarup Bhatnagar Prize; 2011 CDRI Award; 2010 Ranbaxy Research Award; 2008 NCL Scientist of the Year Award
- Scientific career
- Fields: Bioorganic chemistry
- Workplaces: University of Kerala; Banaras Hindu University; University of Oxford; National Chemical Laboratory
- Doctoral advisor: Arya K. Mukerjee; Krishna N. Ganesh; G. W. J. Fleet

Gangadhar J. Sanjayan (born 1968) is an Indian bioorganic chemist, scientist and the head of The Sanjayan Lab at the National Chemical Laboratory, Pune. He is known for his researches on the synthesis of designer peptide/protein mimetics and hetero-foldamers and is a recipient of the Bronze Medal of the Chemical Research Society of India. The Council of Scientific and Industrial Research, the apex agency of the Government of India for scientific research, awarded him the Shanti Swarup Bhatnagar Prize for Science and Technology, one of the highest Indian science awards, in 2012, for his contributions to chemical sciences.

== Biography ==
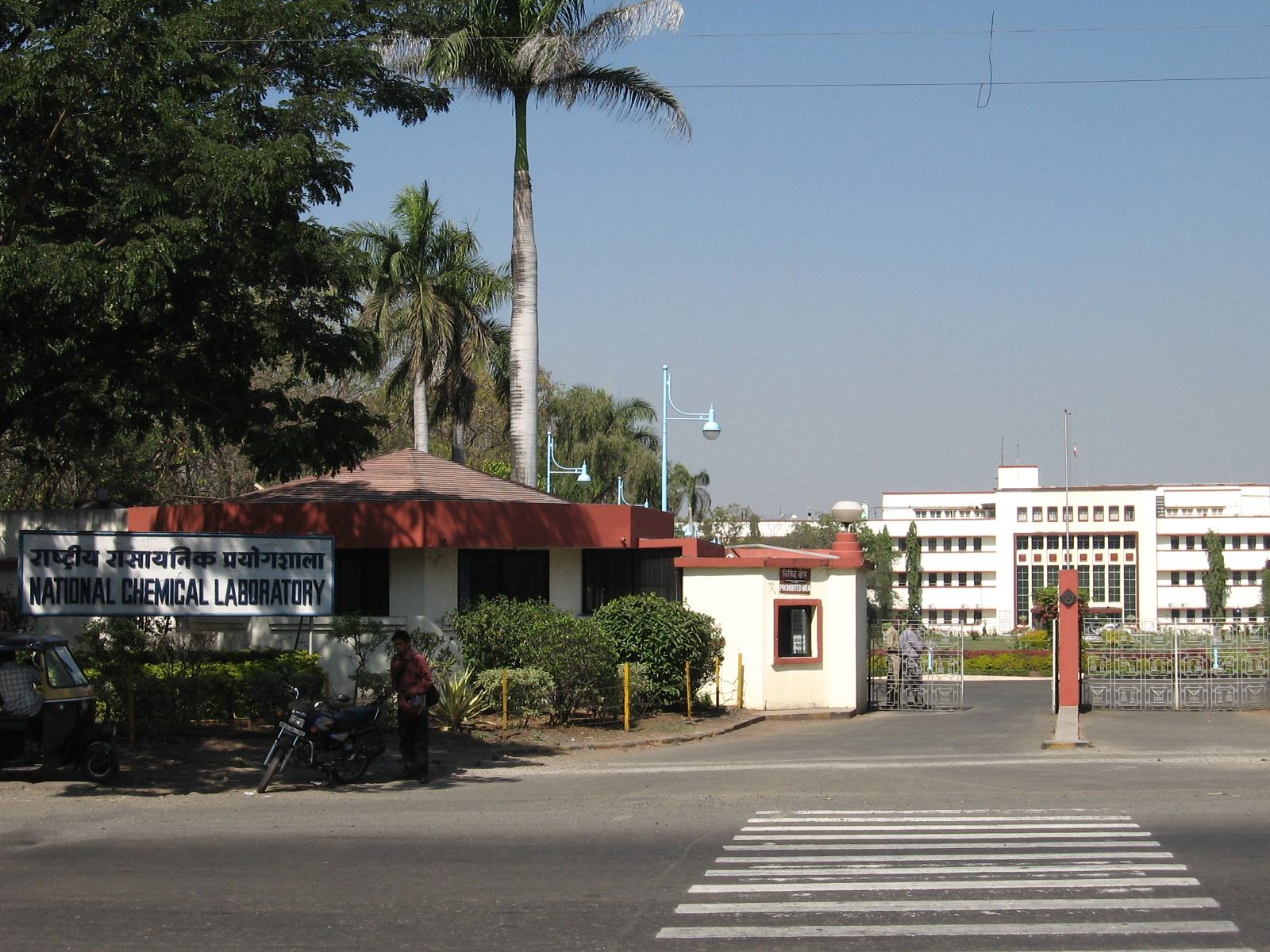
National Chemical Laboratory

Born on 1 June 1968 in the south Indian state of Kerala, G. J. Sanjayan completed his graduate studies in chemistry from the University of Kerala in 1988 and obtained a master's degree from Banaras Hindu University in 1990. He continued his studies at BHU under the guidance of Arya K. Mukerjee and after securing a PhD in 1994, he did his post doctoral studies at National Chemical Laboratory (NCL) during 1995–98 under the supervision of Krishna N. Ganesh, a Shanti Swarup Bhatnagar laureate. On completion of his studies, he joined NCL as a scientist, but had a second stint of post-doctoral studies at the University of Oxford at the laboratory of G. W. J. Fleet during 2000–01. At NCL, he serves as a senior scientist and as the head of the Sanjayan Lab.

== Legacy ==
Sanjayan and his team of scientists at Sanjayan Lab are involved in the studies of molecular architecture with designer characteristics as well as the design and synthesis of molecules that has relevance in medicinal chemistry, especially in therapeutic uses for treating cancer and cardiac diseases. He is known to have synthesized designer peptide and protein mimetics, hetero-foldamers and tubulin-binding agents for treating cancer. His work also covers the development of new organic dyes. His researches have been documented by way of a number of peer-reviewed articles; ResearchGate, an online article repository of scientific articles, has listed 74 of them.

== Awards and honors ==
Sanjayan, who held the research grant of the International Foundation for Science in 2007, received the Scientist of the Year Award of the National Chemical Laboratory in 2008, the same year as he received the fellowship of the Indo-US Science and Technology Forum. Two years later, he received the Ranbaxy Research Award followed by the Award for Excellence in Drug Research of the Central Drug Research Institute in 2011. The Council of Scientific and Industrial Research awarded him the Shanti Swarup Bhatnagar Prize, one of the highest Indian science awards, in 2012. The year 2013 brought him two awards, viz. the annual award of the Organization of Pharmaceutical producers of India and the Bronze Medal of the Chemical Research Society of India. Panjab University honored him with the Bhagyatara Award in 2014.
