= Chatrapati Singh =

Indian percussionist

Raja Chhatrapati Singh Judeo (1919–1998) was an Indian percussionist. He was famous for his virtuosity on Pakhawaj drums used in Hindustani Classical Music.

== Biography ==
Raja Chhatrapati Singh Judeo was born in the royal family of Bijna State in Uttar Pradesh, bordering Madhya Pradesh, India. His grandfather Raja Mukund Singh and father Raja Himmat Singh were patrons of music. He showed a great deal of interest in music from a very early age and started learning Pakhawaj from several masters including Shri Kudau Singh Ji and Swami Ramdas Ji. He became the foremost exponent of the Pakhavaj of his era. He accompanied all the great Dhrupad vocalists including the Dagar Brothers and Pt. Ram Chatur Malik.

His daughter Chandra Singh is a talented Sitar player and his son Raja Surya Pratap Singh also played the Sitar and frequently accompanied his father during his programs.

Singh was awarded the Sangeet Natak Akademi award in 1991. Apart from music he was very fond of traditional wrestling, chess, and mathematics and has written a treatise on knight moves in chess called "Ashwa Nirupan Granth". He died in 1998.
