= Ram Shankar Misra =

Professor of Comparative Religion

Ram Shankar Misra was Professor of Comparative Religionin the Department of Philosophy, Banaras Hindu University.

Among his published books is The Integral Advaitism of Sri Aurobindo (first published in 1957), an important contribution to the philosophical teachings of Sri Aurobindo.
