= Hemendra Prasad Barooah =

Indian entrepreneur, tea planter and philanthropist (1926-2013)

- হেমেন্দ্ৰ প্ৰসাদ বৰুৱা
- Born: April 1, 1926; Jalukonibari, Jorhat, Assam, British Raj
- Died: July 31, 2013 (aged 87); Bangkok
- Education: Harvard University (MBA)
- Occupations: Planter, entrepreneur
- Children: two daughters and one son
- Parent(s): Siva Prasad Barooah; Kamal Kumari Barooah
- Awards: Padma Shri; Lifetime Achievement award Tea Doyen; Assam Title; National Achiever Award; Kamala Saikia Memorial Trust Award

Hemendra Prasad Barooah (Assamese: হেমেন্দ্ৰ প্ৰসাদ বৰুৱা, romanized: Hemendra Prosad Boruwa) (April 1, 1926 – July 31, 2013), was an Indian entrepreneur, tea planter and philanthropist known for his contributions to Assam tea and tourism industries. He was honoured by the Government of India, in 2013, that bestowed on him the Padma Shri, the fourth-highest civilian award, for his contributions to the fields of trade and industry. Barooah served as chairman of the Bengal Chamber of Commerce and Industry and was a director of Indian Airlines Corporation.

== Biography ==
It was clear in his mind how he wanted himself to be remembered, says Wasbir Hussain, noted journalist and Barooah's biographer.

Hemendra Prasad Barooah was born on April 1, 1926 in Jalukonibari, (a village near Jorhat), in the Northeast Indian state of Assam, to Shiva Prasad Barooah and Kamal Kumari Barooah, in 1926. He came from Khongiya Barooah family, a rich Assamese family that was already in tea plantation business established by Bisturam Barooah, a rich planter who started his business during a period when the Britishers were controlling the tea industry in Assam. His father died when Hemen was in his youth and after securing an MBA from the Harvard University, reportedly the first person from the Northeast India to secure a Harvard MBA, Hemendra started out in 1949, with the three tea gardens he inherited from his mother. He nurtured his business after releasing it from the control of the Williamson & Magor Group, which controlled tea business during those times. At the time of his death, Hemndra Barooah controlled nine gardens, held under his Kolkata-based business firm, Barooahs and Associates Pvt. Ltd.

Hemen Barooah was known for his efforts to counter the threats of United Liberation Front of Assam, an Assam separatist group banned as a terrorist outfit by the Government of India, which, at times, resorted to violent attacks. He was a known art collector reportedly owning 600 works and has also produced a film, Ek Pal, directed by Kalpana Lajmi. His life story has been written by Wasbir Hussain, a noted journalist and published under the name, Life And Times - Story Of An Assamese Tea Baron.

On 26 January 2013, the Government of India announced the award of Padma Shri to Hemendra Prasad Barooah, honouring him for his services to the Trade and Industry of India. Six months later, on 31 July 2013, Barooah, aged 86, died at Bangkok, while on a trip to the Thailand capital for medical treatment. His wife and only son, Amit Barooah, having preceded him, he was survived by his oldest daughter and her family as well as his late son's daughter, Shey Naima Barooah. It was reported that Barooah had already built his mausoleum earlier, in 2004, decked with a green marble with only the date of death left to be filled.

Assam Tea Brokers, the first tea broking firm in Assam, founded by Hemen Barooah, remains as his legacy. He is credited with efforts to bring tea tourism to Assam, by opening his ancestral home, Thengal Manor, and two other colonial buildings to tourists and by founding the Heritage North East, a Boutique heritage hotel and the Kaziranga Golf Resorts, Sangsua. The ITA Centre, at Machkhowa, reportedly built by him, is also another contribution credited to him.

Hemen Barooah has established a charity foundation, The Kamal Kumari Foundation, and the foundation gives annual awards to recognize excellence in the fields of science and technology (Kamal Kumari National Award), journalism (Siva Prasad Barooah National Award) and art (Amit Borooah Award).

== Positions ==
Hemendra Barooah has served in many positions. Besides heading his business concerns such as B&A Ltd and B&A Packaging, he has also served as the chairman of the Bengal Chamber of Commerce and Industry. He was also a member of the Tea Board during the period 1963–1973. He was also the chairman of the Eastern chapter of the State Bank of India, the Director of Indian Airlines Corporation, member of the Central Advisory Council for Industrial Development, New Delhi and the chairman of the Tea Research Association.

== Awards and recognitions ==
Apart from the Padma Shri, he has received many other awards and titles.

- Lifetime Achievement award - North Eastern Tea Association - 2007
- Tea Doyen - North Eastern Tea Association - 2007
- Assam Title - Confederation of Indian Industry - 2010
- National Achiever Award - K. C. Das Commerce College - 2010
- Kamala Saikia Memorial Trust Award - 2012

He was felicitated by the Tea Research Association in 2011 and by the Assam Cultural Trust in 2012. In 2007, Assam Cultural University conferred on him a doctorate (Honoris Causa).
