= Plasma Science Society of India =

Plasma Science Society of India was founded in 1978 at Institute for Plasma Research, Ahmedabad in India for the benefit of the fusion community working on plasma. This serves the thrive for knowledge towards the fusion research in the field of theoretical and experimental research, it associated with India Science, Technology and Innovation, . The devices are SST-1, SINP-Tokamak, AdityaTokamak, SST-2 (DEMO) to generate the electricity.There are over 950 life-member of this society along with number of annual members.
