= Dhiraj Bora =

Indian physicist (1951–2021)

- Born: 30 September 1951; Guwahati, Assam, India
- Died: 19 June 2021 (aged 69); Ahmadabad, Gujarat, India
- Education: St. Stephen's College, Delhi University of Delhi Peoples' Friendship University of Russia; Physical Research Laboratory
- Awards: Kamal Kumari National Award, 2012
- Scientific career
- Fields: Plasma physics
- Workplaces: Physical Research Laboratory; Institute for Plasma Research; Assam Science and Technology University

Dhiraj Bora (30 September 1951 – 19 June 2021) was an Indian physicist, educationist and professor. Bora, known as a plasma scientist, was a former director of the Institute of Plasma Research located in Gandhinagar, Gujarat. He was the chief scientist of the ITER – India. He won the Kamal Kumari National Award in 2012 in recognition of his contribution to the field of science. In 2016 he was elected as the vice-chancellor of Assam Science and Technology University and held the post until his death. He died on 19 June 2021.

== Early life and education ==
Dhiraj Bara was born in Guwahati on 30 September 1951. His father was Lalit Chandra Bora and mother Kusum Bora. He was educated at Senikuthi Primary School in Guwahati. He was then educated at Manik Chandra Barua ME School. He then joined Cotton Collegiate School but got a scholarship from the Government of India and enrolled in the Daly College in Indore, Madhya Pradesh in class VII. After completing class XII in 1968, he enrolled in St. Stephen's College, Delhi University and graduated with a Bachelor of Science degree. In 1975, he received a Master's degree in Experimental Physics from People's Friendship University, Moscow, Russia. He then received his PhD. in 1979 from the Physical Research Laboratory, Gujarat University.
