= Wasbir Hussain =

Indian journalist, author, moderator and political commentator

- Born: Sibsagar, Assam
- Years active: 1984 – present
- Notable credit(s): Talk Time with Wasbir Hussain – A Weekly English Talk Show on News Live, on air since 2008
- Television: North East Live, News Live

Wasbir Hussain is an Indian journalist, author, and political commentator specializing in peace, security and development in Northeast India. He is the Editor-in-Chief of North East Live.

== Career ==
Beginning his career as a journalist in 1984, Hussain covered Northeast India, Bangladesh and Bhutan for major Indian newspapers and journals, including The Hindu, The Telegraph, India Today Group Online, and Outlook. He was also Editor of The Northeast Daily, an English daily from Guwahati, and was Consulting Editor of The Sentinel, a premier English daily from Assam. He had also been Consulting Editor of Times Now TV (2009-2016).

Hussain has written regularly for The Associated Press and a host of other newspapers and journals. Besides, his writings on security issues concerning India's Northeast and its surrounding foreign neighbours appear regularly in strategic affairs think tanks and journals. His major research work has been on the issues of insurgency and trans-national insurgency in Northeast India, comparative study of ethnic insurrections in Northeast India and the Maoist rebellion in Chhattisgarh, Jharkhand and Andhra Pradesh, the problem of illegal migration and demographic 'invasion' in Northeast India, ethno-nationalism, and India's Act East Policy. He has also reviewed strategic and political developments in Myanmar and China and written opinion pieces on these issues.

One of the founders of the research and policy think tank, the Centre for Development and Peace Studies, he is currently its executive director. In 2006 and 2008, Hussain was appointed a member of India's National Security Advisory Board.

He is the Editor-in-Chief of North East Live, northeastern India's first satellite English News Channel, with headquarters in Guwahati. The channel is the latest venture of Pride East Entertainments Pvt Ltd, the region's largest media group. Hussain hosts a debate show on the Channel titled 'Northeast Tonight with Wasbir Hussain, telecast every Saturday at 8 pm. The program involves discussion on current trending topics in Northeast India. He also hosts a weekly English talk show 'Talk Time with Wasbir Hussain' on News Live, a Group channel. In 2017, Hussain and two of his associates established the region's first state-of-the-art Television Media Institute at Guwahati called Turning Point Institute of Media & Creative Skills.

== Critical reception ==
In the 2003 collection Missing Boundaries: Refugees, Migrants, Stateless and Internally Displaced Persons in South Asia, based on 2002 Institute of Peace and Conflict Studies (IPCS) conference proceedings, Hussain contributed a chapter with a case study on Bangladeshi migrants into Northeast India, and according to a review by Alan B. Anderson in Pacific Affairs, "What might have seemed to be some rather obvious refugee and population displacement dilemmas to include in the book are missing, at least as separate case studies, yet the cases that are included are important and interesting." A review by Sanjana Chappalli in South Asia Research, despite finding the book "a little one-sided" for presenting "the migrant population as contributing to conflict and security problems," acknowledges the effort to focus on displacement and migration, including in how "this volume directs the gaze upon lesser known migrant communities - the Lhotsampas following their eviction from Bhutan, the Bihari Muslims in Bangladesh, the Burmese Rohingayas in Bangladesh, and the internally displaced people in Sri Lanka."

In 2006, Hussain released Homemakers Without the Men: Assam's Widows of Violence, described in a review by the Indo-Asian News Service, published in The Hindustan Times, as a book "about 12 courageous women - who lost their husbands or kin during the decades-long insurgency in Assam - but have not given up on life," which also notes Hussain "has been writing on insurgency and ethnic strife in Assam and other northeastern states for more than two decades and has short-listed women survivors from across the state for his work." Guwahati-based sociologist Anima Guha said Hussain "has brought out the pathos, trauma, struggle and challenges of these remarkable women." Amrit Jyoti Mahanta writes in a review of the book in The Hindu, "To his credit, the author refrains from judgmental statements while narrating the incidents. Apart from pointing out various related issues like economic hardship (except in the case of a fortunate few) and at times loneliness (ostracized by a panic-stricken society), he argues for some urgent necessities like professional counselling to the shocked family members."

In December 2010, Hussain released the authorized biography Tarun Gogoi: The Inside Story of a Blunt Politician, about the now-former Chief Minister of Assam, Tarun Gogoi. A review by Pramathesh Borkotoky in the magazine Fried Eye states, "The book is not a typical political biography. The author attempts to touch certain aspects of political history of Assam through the eyes of Tarun Gogoi," and "I would have liked if the book also addressed some of the more serious allegations made against him than those addressed here."

In the 2012 collection Armed Conflicts in South Asia 2011: The Promise and Threat of Transformation, edited by D. Suba Chandran and P.R. Chari, which was described by Raviprasad Narayana in a review for the Journal of International and Global Studies as "a comprehensive survey of the conflicts plaguing the region" that "brings together an eclectic group of scholars and practitioners," Hussain contributed a chapter on northeast region conflict, and "attributes the sustainability of the conflict to several reasons: the plethora of armed groups in a region which is an ethnic mosaic, the existence of porous borders making the situation complicated, the development process undertaken by the union government to work hand-in-hand with anti-insurgency operations, need for the Armed Forces Special Powers Act to be repealed or amended, and the lack of a regional anti-terror network." A review in HIMALAYA by Olivia Molden notes Hussain's chapter covers "the rise of terrorism in Northeast India," and the collection, which is "part of an annual series on the state of peace and conflict on the Indian subcontinent [, ...] paints a picture of dynamic and persistent conflict across South Asia."

== Honors and awards ==
- Sanskriti Foundation Award for excellence in journalism
- 2005 Kunjabala Devi Memorial Award (for investigating reporting on women's issues; his 12-part series of articles on widows "who lost their husbands during insurgency and other forms of violence")
- 2022 All Assam Journalists' Union award

== Bibliography ==
Some of the books Hussain has authored or edited touches on issues of communal harmony and has succeeded in highlighting the devastating impact of violence and insurgency. His books include:

- Homemakers Without The Men: Assam's Widows Of Violence (Indialog Publications, New Delhi, 2006)
- Child Victims of Ethnic Violence (Bulwark Books & Institute for Conflict management, New Delhi, 2004),
- Order in Chaos: Essays on Conflict in India's Northeast and the Road to Peace in South Asia (Spectrum Publications, Guwahati / New Delhi, 2006),
- Positive in Rhino Land: Battle against HIV/AIDS in Assam (Wordweaves India, Guwahati, 2008)
- Peace Tools & Conflict Nuances in India's Northeast (Wordweaves India, Guwahati, 2010),
- Tarun Gogoi: The Inside Story of a Blunt Politician (Wordweaves India, Guwahati, 2010)
- Chord of Harmony: Sattras and Dargahs of Assam (Wordweaves India, Guwahati, 2010, co-authored with Bhaskar Jyoti Mahanta),
- Kamrup: The Mirror of Assam's Past and Present (Wordweaves India, Guwahati, 2013, co-edited with Ashutosh Agnihotri).
- Northeast India: The Maoist Spread (Wordweaves India, Guwahati, 2014),
- Shared Rivers in South Asia: Challenges and Prospects in Lower Riparian States (Wordweaves India, Guwahati, 2015),
- Assamese Cinema: 80 Years (Wordweaves India, Guwahati, 2015, co-edited with Maini Mahanta),
- Power Play in Assam Hills: Aspirations, Developments & Politics in Dima Hasao (Wordweaves India, Guwahati, 2017)
