= North East Live =

Indian television channel

- Logo of North East Live
- Country: India
- Broadcast area: India and worldwide
- Headquarters: News Live Building, G.S. Road, Christian Basti, Guwahati, Assam, India

Programming
- Languages: English; Hindi

Ownership
- Owner: Pride East Entertainments Pvt. Ltd.
- Key people: Riniki Bhuyan Sarma (CMD); Wasbir Hussain (Editor in Chief)
- Sister channels: Rang; Ramdhenu; News Live

History
- Launched: 30 September 2013; 12 years ago

Links
- Website: northeastlivetv.com

North East Live is a 24-hour satellite news channel of Assam, India broadcasting in English and Hindi, mainly focusing on the North-East India. Northeast Live is the first satellite English news channel covering the eight states of the Northeast. It was launched on 30 September 2013 in Arunachal Pradesh by Chief Minister Nabam Tuki in the presence of Development of North East Region (DoNER) Minister Paban Singh Ghatowar. It is owned by Pride East Entertainments Pvt. Ltd. of Guwahati, Assam. It is a sister channel of popular Assamese news channel News Live, Rang, Ramdhenu and Indradhanu. The channel comprises senior journalist Wasbir Hussain as editor-in-chief.

== Programming ==
- Hero ISL 2018
- Good Morning Northeast
- Khabar 9 Baje
- NE Kitchen
- Good Life: The Health Show
- Sports Zone
- E-Time
- Khabar Dopahar
- Afternoon Headlines
- Talk Time
- Samachar Northeast
- Evening Prime
- Northeast Tonight
- Region Diary
