= Manas Chaudhuri =

Indian politician

- Born: Shillong, Meghalaya, India
- Occupations: Journalist; Politician
- Parent: Parsva Nath Chaudhuri
- Relatives: Ardhendu Chaudhuri
- Awards: Padma Shri

Manas Chaudhuri is an Indian journalist and the former editor of Shillong Times, an English-language daily published from the Meghalayan capital of Shillong. He won as a legislator to the Shillong Assembly twice from the Mawprem constituency as an independent candidate. He is a former cabinet minister of the State and served at the Shillong Times as its editor from 1978 to 2008, when he resigned from the post for Patricia Mukhim to take over. The Government of India awarded him the Padma Shri in 2005 for his contributions to Indian journalism. He is the founder of the Ardhendu Chaudhuri Charitable Trust.

== Career ==
Chaudhuri is a former editor of The Shillong Times, for 30 years he led it to eventually become Meghalaya's premier English daily. He has earned respect in the field of journalism in the Northeast in general and Meghalaya in particular, for his courageous exposes of corruption in high places and for his independent, but liberal, editorial policy.

Chaudhuri is the founding president of the Shillong Press Club and a past president of the Meghalaya Editors' & Publishers' Association. He is a member of the selection committee of the Media Exchange Programme of the National Foundation for India in New Delhi.

He is associated with a host of educational and cultural institutions of Shillong. He has been the honorary secretary of the Rilbong PN Chaudhuri Secondary School, Shillong, uninterruptedly for 40 years and helped the school grow to a position of respectability. He is the president of the governing body of the Lady Keane Girls' Higher Secondary School. Chaudhuri is a trustee of Sri Aurobindo Institute of Indian Culture. He is the president of the Rilbong Sports & Cultural Club, one of the most active youth organisations of Meghalaya engaged in multi-dimensional social, cultural and sports activities. Chaudhuri is a past district governor of Rotary International District 3240 and a past master of the Freemasons' Lodge. In 1998 he led Rotary International's Group Study Exchange Team from District 3240 to Ohio, US. He also led a Rotary Friendship Mission to Bangladesh in 1996.

Chaudhuri was part of the prime minister's press entourage to Pakistan, Thailand, UK, Cuba, Philippines, Russia, Germany, Brazil and US with Dr. Manmohan Singh.

He is the recipient of the Padmashree Award in 2005, "Pride of Shillong" Award instituted by Geetali—a reputed cultural organisation of Shillong.

He is the managing trustee of Ardhendu Chaudhuri Charitable Trust, which was created to perpetuate the memory of his brother who died in a helicopter crash while on tour as an MLA. The Trust has been undertaking welfare activities in the spirit of "Service Above Self" out of his personal contributions. He is one of few elected public representatives in the country who donated all his earnings as MLA to serving the less fortunate. He has conceived and implemented a unique initiative called "Aahar" under which some 300 poor and hungry people are being provided with a wholesome free meal every day, funded entirely out of his personal contribution to the ACCT.

== Political career ==
He was elected as a Member of the Meghalaya Legislative Assembly in 2005 as an independent candidate securing 52% of the popular vote. In 2008, he was re-elected; and served as a Cabinet minister holding the portfolios of Higher & Technical Education, Information & Public Relations. During his tenure as Minister, he took a number of measures to reform the education system of Meghalaya. These included the introduction of pension benefits for college teachers and lecturers, the creation of girls' hostels, construction of lavatories, libraries, and the creation of a music university in Shillong. It was during his tenure that Meghalaya's Education Policy was adopted and implemented. In 2013, he contested the Meghalaya Legislative Assembly elections as a candidate of the Indian National Congress (INC) from South Shillong and lost to Sanbor Shullai. He again lost the 2018 Meghalaya Legislative Assembly elections to Shullai, who this time was a BJP candidate.

With a view to maintaining transparency and probity to public life, Sri Chaudhuri provided full statement of accounts of all the money received by him as an MLA and their appropriation. This initiative was lauded the then-Prime Minister of India, Dr. Manmohan Singh.

== Personal life ==
He is married to Shobha Chaudhuri. They have three children: Shreya, Esha, and Aneesh.

== See also ==
- Shillong Times
