= Sarbeswar Bujarbarua =

Indian physicist

- Born: 1 March 1948; Guwahati, Assam, India
- Education: Gujarat University Physical Research LaboratoryPhD Gauhati University DSc
- Known for: Plasma Physics Theory space science
- Awards: Hari Om Ashram Prerit Vikram Sarabhai Award (1989) Kamal Kumari National Award (1993) Lifetime Achievement Award (2017)Government of Assam
- Scientific career
- Fields: Plasma Physics, theoretical physics space science
- Workplaces: Institute for Plasma Research, Centre of Plasma Physics - Institute for Plasma Research Founder Director University of Bayreuth Kyushu University Ruhr University
- Doctoral advisor: Abhijit Sen

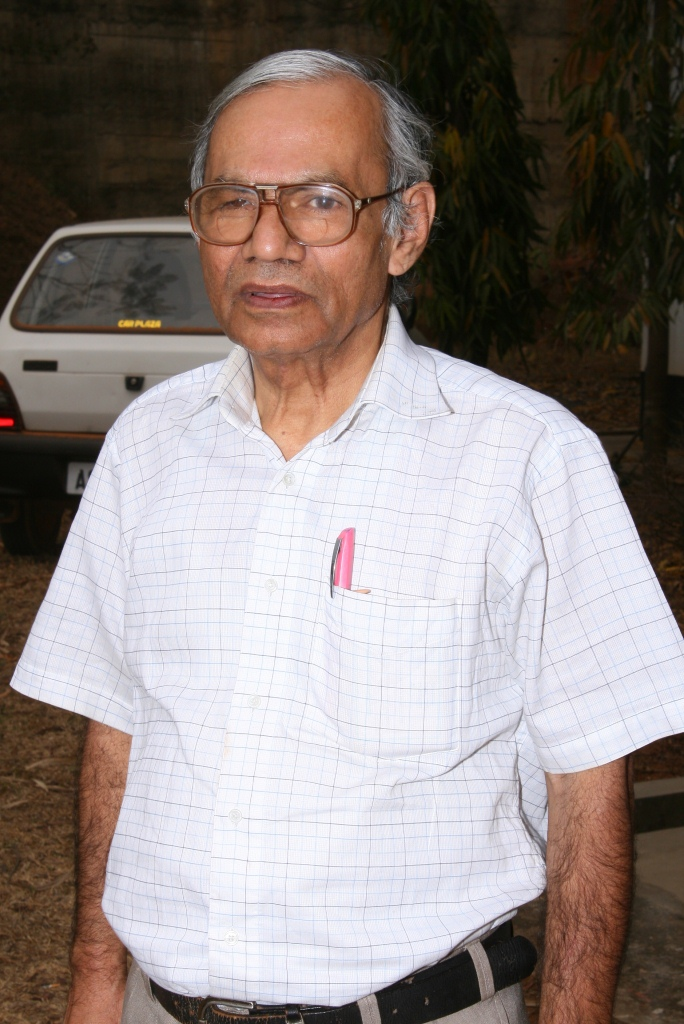
Founder of CPP-IPR Prof. S. Bujarbarua

Sarbeswar Bujarbarua is an Indian physicist. Educated at Gujarat University and Gauhati University, he founded the Centre of Plasma Physics as part of the Institute for Plasma Research and served as its director for 30 years.
