= Ramdhenu =

Assamese music channel

- Logo used since 2011
- Country: India
- Headquarters: News Live Building, G.S. Road, Christian Basti, Guwahati, Assam, India

Programming
- Language: Assamese
- Picture format: 480i (SDTV)

Ownership
- Owner: Pride East Entertainments Pvt. Ltd.
- Sister channels: News Live; Rang; North East Live; Indradhanu

History
- Launched: 1 October 2011; 14 years ago

Links
- Website: www.ramdhenutv.org

Ramdhenu (transl. Rainbow) is a Assamese language music channel. It was launched on 1 October 2011 and is a part of the Pride East Entertainments Pvt. Ltd. based in Guwahati, Assam owned by Riniki Bhuyan Sarma It is the first ever satellite music TV channel of the northeast India. The channel broadcast recently released music videos.
