= Kamal Kumari Barooah =

Matriarch of the Khongiya Barooah family of Thengal, Assam

- Born: 1899; Borelengi Satra, Assam
- Died: 1978 (aged 78–79); Assam
- Other names: Aaita
- Citizenship: Indian
- Known for: Pioneer woman, Entrepreneur in a male-dominated society
- Spouse: Siva Prasad Barooah
- Children: Hemendra Prasad Barooah
- Parents: Mahendranath Mahanta (father); Swarnalata Mahanta (mother)

Kamal Kumari Barooah (Assamese: কমল কুমাৰী বৰুৱা) (1899–1978) was the matriarch of the Khongiya Barooah family of Thengal, Assam. She was born to Mahendranath Mahanta and Swarnalata Mahanta at Borelengi Satra. In 1917, she married Siva Prasad Barooah of Khongiya Barooah family, the family that emerged as the champion of Assamese interests and repository of Assamese culture and traditions. Noted Indian entrepreneur, tea planter and philanthropist Hemendra Prasad Barooah was her son.

After her husband's death in 1938, she had to handle the huge Thengal household alone, starting from running their tea-gardens to retaining the family properties for her children. In order to run their businesses, she educated herself in English as well as in tea craft.

== K K Foundation ==
The Kamal Kumari Foundation was instituted in her fond memory in 1990. It has been conferring the Kamal Kumari National Award since 1991 to individual or group for outstanding contributions to the field of Art, Culture & Literature and Science & Technology. The other award the foundation has been conferring is the Siva Prasad Barooah National Award in journalism.

== See also ==
- Siva Prasad Barooah
- The Kamal Kumari Foundation
- Kamal Kumari National Award
