= Siva Prasad Barooah =

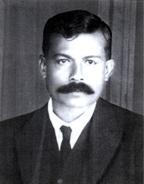
- Born: 1880; Assam
- Died: 1938 (aged 57–58)
- Citizenship: Indian
- Occupations: Tea-planter; Advocate; Journalist
- Known for: Pioneer of Assamese Journalism, Richest tea-planter of his time, philanthropist, humanist
- Spouse: Kamal Kumari Barooah
- Children: Hemendra Prasad Barooah

Siva Prasad Barooah (1880–1938) was a renowned planter, philanthropist, politician, and humanist from Assam. He was the pioneer or path-breaker in Assamese journalism who published Batori, the first daily newspaper in Assam. The Siva Prasad Barooah National Award, instituted in his fond memory, is being given to individual or group, by The Kamal Kumari Foundation since 1999, for outstanding contributions to the field of journalism. He belongs to the famous Khongiya Barooah family of Thengal, the family that emerged as the champion of Assamese interests and repository of Assamese Culture and traditions. He was the richest tea-planter at that time in India. He married Kamal Kumari Barooah in 1917. He had three sons - Sailendra Prasad Barooah, Hemendra Prasad Barooah and Romendra Prasad Barooah. Hemendra Prasad Barooah, the second son, was a noted Indian entrepreneur, tea planter and philanthropist Hemendra Prasad Barooah was his son.
