= Shri Krishna Joshi =

Indian physicist (1935-2020)

S. K. Joshi
- Born: June 6, 1935; Almora, Uttarakhand, British India
- Died: May 15, 2020 (aged 84); Gurgaon, India
- Education: Allahabad University
- Scientific career
- Fields: Physics
- Workplaces: Allahabad University; University of California Riverside; IIT Roorkee (formerly University of Roorkee); National Physical Laboratory; CSIR
- Doctoral advisor: Kedareswar Banerjee

Prof. Shri Krishna Joshi (6 June 1935 – 15 May 2020) was an Indian physicist. He was born on 6 June 1935 in the village of Anarpa in Kumaun, Uttarakhand, India.

== Career ==
Joshi received his Ph.D. in physics from Allahabad University in 1962. Joshi's broad areas of interest are condensed matter and collision processes. His early research was in the study of phonons in metals and insulators. He later studied electronic states in disordered systems and electron correlation in narrow band solids. He has also worked on Surface states and Segregation in materials. Joshi conducted studies on excitation and ionization processes in atoms, ions, and molecules. His research interests lie in strongly correlated electron systems, such as high temperature superconductors, and also in nanotechnology, especially electron transport in quantum dots and nanotubes.

Joshi supervised the Ph.D. theses of twenty scholars and has published more than 190 research papers. He was a Professor of Physics at the Indian Institute of Technology, Roorkee from 1967 to 1986. He was the Director of the National Physical Laboratory from 1986 to 1991. In 1991, he was appointed the Director General of the Indian Council of Scientific and Industrial Research. After retiring in 1995, he was awarded the Sarabhai Research Professorship in Physics and worked on condensed matter theory at the National Physical Laboratory in New Delhi.

== Awards ==
- Padma Shri (1991)
- Padma Bhushan (2003).
- Watumull Memorial Prize (1965)
- Shanti Swarup Bhatnagar Prize for Physical Sciences (1972)
- CSIR Silver Jubilee Award in (1973)
- Meghnad Saha Award for Research in Theoretical Sciences (1974)
- Dr. K.S. Krishnan Memorial Lectureship of INSA (1987)
- FICCI Award in Physical Sciences (1990)
- Dr. Mahendra Lal Sircar Prize by IACS Calcutta for 1989 (in 1994)
- Goyal Prize in Physics by Goyal Foundation (1993)
- CV Raman Medal of INSA (1999)
- Kamal Kumari National Award (2011)

He was awarded a D.Sc. honoris causa from Kumaun University in 1994, from Kanpur University in 1995, Benaras Hindu University in 1996, and the University of Burdwan in 2005.

He was elected Fellow of the Indian National Science Academy in 1974. He was the Secretary of the Academy from 1983 to 1986 and its Foreign Secretary from 1989 to 1992. He was elected President of the INSA in 1993. He has been a Fellow of the Indian Academy of Sciences since 1974, and was vice president from 1989 to 1991. Joshi was president of the Indian Physics Association from 1989 to 1990. He was president of the Materials Research Society of India. Joshi is a Fellow of the Third World Academy of Sciences, and a Foreign Member of the Russian Academy of Sciences. In 2019, he inaugurated, with colleagues, the Aryabhatt Auditorium at the “Prof. Rajendra Singh (Rajju Bhaiya) Institute of Physical Sciences for Study and Research" at the Veer Bahadur Singh Purvanchal University of Jaunpur

• A Science Center has been named after S. K. Joshi in his remembrance at Devasthal, ARIES (Aryabhatta Research Institute Of Observational Sciences). It was inaugurated by former ISRO Chairman Dr A. S. Kiran Kumar.
