= Jitendra Nath Goswami =

Indian scientist

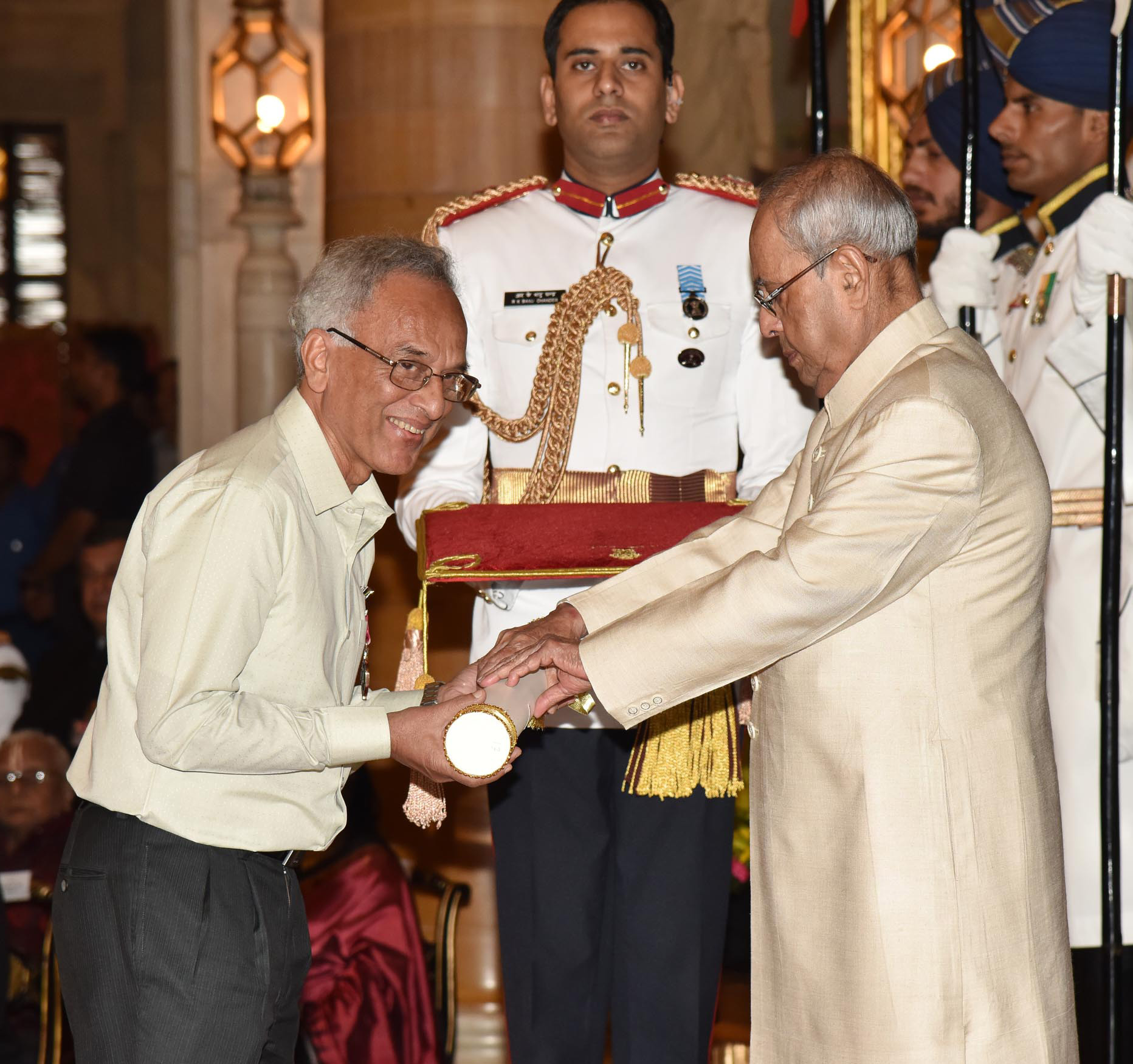
- Jitendra Nath Goswami (left) receiving the Padma Shri award from Pranab Mukherjee, President of India in 2017
- Born: 18 November 1950 (age 75); Jorhat, Assam, India
- Education: Cotton College; Gauhati University; Tata Institute of Fundamental Research; Gujarat University
- Known for: Chandrayaan-1; Chandrayaan-2
- Awards: NASA's Public Service Group Achievement Award (1986); Shanti Swarup Bhatnagar Prize (1994); Kamal Kumari National Award (2003); Asom Ratna (2015); Padma Shri (2017)
- Scientific career
- Fields: Astrophysics
- Workplaces: Physical Research Laboratory; Indian Space Research Organization

Jitendranath Goswami (born 18 November 1950) is an Indian scientist from Jorhat, Assam. He was the chief scientist of Chandrayaan-1, and was also the developer of this project. He served as a director of Physical Research Laboratory situated at Ahmadabad, Gujarat. He was also associated with Chandrayaan-2 and Mangalyaan.

== Education ==
Goswami started his schooling in Jorhat. In 1965, he was sixth in the higher secondary examination conducted by AHSEC. Soon after, he enrolled in Cotton College to study Physics. He got his MSc from Gauhati University and joined Tata Institute of Fundamental Research for his PhD. At this time he also worked as a post-graduate research scholar at the University of California, Berkeley. In 1978, he received his PhD degree from Gujarat University.

== Research ==
Following his PhD, Goswami conducted research at various institutions, including UC Berkeley, Washington University in St. Louis, Lunar and Planetary Institute, and the Max Planck Institute. His research primarily centered on the Solar System and Astrophysics. Through collaborative efforts, evidence was presented suggesting the main source of energy for the Solar System during its formation was the 26Al nuclide in its half-life. Goswami has also contributed to studies on Cosmic Rays and Tectonic Plates, resulting in various findings and conclusions. At the Physical Research Laboratory, he participated in exploration projects, and contributed to ISRO in its early phases. He was an associate scientist for the Cosmic Ray experiment and the lead scientist for Lunar Samples on spacecraft Spacelab-3. Additionally, he was a member of the Physical Sciences jury for the Infosys Prize between 2016 and 2018.

== Awards ==
- Youth Scientist Award by Indian National Science Association (1978)
- NASA's Public Service Group of Achievement Award (1986)
- Shanti Swaroop Bhatnagar Award (1994)
- Kamal Kumari National Award for science and technology (2003)
- Axford award by Asia Oceania Geoscience Society (2014)
- Asom Ratna (2015), highest civilian award of Government of Assam
- Padma Shri, 2017 by Government of India.
- Asian Scientist 100, Asian Scientist, (2018)
- Founding Fellow of the Physics Academy of the North East (2024)

Goswami was elected president of the Astronomical Society of India in 2007. He is a member of The World Academy of Sciences, Indian Academy of Sciences, European Association of Geochemistry and many other national and international astronomy associations.
