= Assam Ratna =

Assam Ratna অসম ৰত্ন
- Civilian award for contributions in literature, art and culture and social service
- Sponsored by: Government of Assam
- Reward: ₹300,000
- First award: 2009
- Final award: 2015

Highlights
- Total awarded: 3
- First winner: Dr. Bhupen Hazarika
- Last winner: Dr. Jitendranath Goswami

Assam Ratna, also spelled Asom Ratna (অসম ৰত্ন) was the highest civilian award in the State of Assam, India. It was being conferred for outstanding contribution in literature, art and culture and social service. The award was offered by the Government of Assam. It was started in 2009 and Dr. Bhupen Hazarika was first awardee. Famous Indian scientist from Assam Dr. Jitendranath Goswami who got Assam Ratna for 2015 is last awardee. The award carries a cash prize of ₹300,000, a plaque and a shawl.

== Recipients ==
| Seriel No | Name | Year | Field | Image |
|---|---|---|---|---|
| 1. | Dr Bhupen Hazarika | 2009 | Arts | |
| 2. | Dr. Mamoni Raisom Goswami | 2010 | Literature | |
| 3. | Dr. Jitendra Nath Goswami | 2015 | Science and Technology | |
