= Steady State Superconducting Tokamak =

Indian fusion energy research device

SST-1
Steady State Superconducting Tokamak
- Device type: Tokamak
- Location: Gandhinagar, India
- Affiliation: Department of Atomic Energy

Technical specifications
- Major radius: 1.1 m (3 ft 7 in)
- Minor radius: 0.2 m (7.9 in)
- Magnetic field: 3 T (30,000 G)

History
- Year(s) of operation: 2005–present

Links
- Website: www.dae.gov.in/node/255

SST-1 (or Steady State Superconducting Tokamak) is a plasma confinement experimental device in the Institute for Plasma Research (IPR), an autonomous research institute under Department of Atomic Energy, India. It belongs to a new generation of tokamaks with the major objective being steady state operation of an advanced configuration ('D' Shaped) plasma. It has been designed as a medium-sized tokamak with superconducting magnets.

The SST-1 project helped India become capable of conceptualizing and making a fully functional fusion based reactor device. The SST-1 System is housed in Institute for Plasma Research, Gandhinagar. The SST-1 mission has been led by Indian plasma physicists Prof. Y.C. Saxena, Dr. Chenna Reddy, Dr. Subrata Pradhan and Dr. Daniel Raju (presently).

SST-1 will be followed by a larger machine SST-2 before building the Indian DEMO fusion power plant.

== History ==
The first talks about SST Mission started in 1994. The technical details and mechanical drawings of the system were finalized in 2001. The machine was fabricated by 2005. Godrej-Boyce Pvt. Ltd. played a crucial role in fabrication of the SST-1 coils. The assembly of SST-1 convinced senior members of the Indian Civil Service to approve the requests of Indian physicists to join the ITER program [See Info Box]. On 17 August 2005, PM Sayeed, then India's power minister informed the Rajya Sabha about India's claim to join ITER. A team from ITER, France visited the SST-1 mission control housed in Institute for Plasma Research to see the advances Indian scientists had made. Finally on 6 December 2005, India was officially accepted as a full partner of the ITER project. To improve and modify some of the components, the SST-1 machine was subsequently disassembled. The improved version of the machine was completely assembled by January 2012.

It was fully commissioned in 2013. And by 2015, produces repeatable plasma discharges up to ~ 500 ms with plasma currents in excess of 75000 A at a central field of 1.5 T. "SST-1 is also the only tokamak in the world with superconducting toroidal field magnets operating in two-phase helium instead of supercritical helium in a cryo-stable manner, thereby demonstrating reduced cold helium consumption. "

As of Dec 2015 it is having upgrades including to the plasma facing components to allow longer pulses.

== Objectives ==
Traditionally the tokamaks have operated with a `transformer' action- with plasma acting as a secondary, thus having the vital `self-generated' magnetic field on top of the `externally generated' (toroidal and equilibrium) fields. This is a pretty good scheme in which creation, current-drive and heating are neatly integrated and remained a choice of the fusion community for many years until the stage came to heat the plasma to multi-keV temperatures. Heating was then accomplished separately by radio frequency (RF) waves and/or energetic neutral beam injection (NBI).

Subsequently, excellent control got established on tokamak plasma performance by controlling the plasma-wall interaction processes at the plasma boundary so the plasma duration was limited primarily by the `transformer pulse length'. However, for relevance to future power reactors it is essential to operate these devices in a steady state mode. The very idea of steady state operation presents a series of physics and technology challenges. For example, the excellent plasma performance which was accomplished earlier, was with the surrounding material wall acting as a good 'pump' of particles, a fact which may not be true in steady state.

So one has to try and accomplish an equally good performance in presence of a possibly `saturated' wall. Secondly, a host of engineering and technical considerations spring up. The magnets must be superconducting type, otherwise the power dissipation in conventional (resistive) types can reach uneconomical levels. They have to be specially designed to remain superconducting in spite of their proximity to the other `warm' objects (like vacuum vessel etc.). The heat and particle exhaust must be handled in steady state with specialized tiles and active cooling. The advanced, so-called double null divertor plasma configuration has to be maintained through efficient feedback control avoiding plasma disruptions over long discharge durations.

== Tokamak parameters ==
Toroidal field, B_{θ}	3 T
Plasma current, I_{P}	0.22 MA
Major radius, R_{0}	1.1 m
Minor radius, a	0.2 m
Aspect ratio, R/a	5.5
Elongation, κ	<=1.9
Triangularity, δ	<=0.8
Ion cyclotron resonance heating (ICRH)	1 MW
Lower hybrid current drive (LHCD)	1 MW
Neutral beam injection (NBI)	1 MW
Discharge Duration	1000 s
Configuration	Double-null divertor

== Plasma diagnostics on SST-1 ==
SST-1 will feature many new plasma diagnostic devices, many of which are being used for the first time in fusion research in India. Some of the novel plasma diagnostics devices incorporated in SST-1 are:

- Fast Scanning Langmuir probe system
- Gas Puff Imaging Diagnostics
- Bolometer for imaging Divertor radiations

Almost all of the diagnostic devices installed on SST-1 are indigenous and are designed and developed by Diagnostics Group of Institute for Plasma Research. This group is the only group working on plasma diagnostics and related technologies in Indian Subcontinent.

== SST-2 ==
The next stage of SST mission, the SST-2 fusion reactor, dubbed as 'DEMO' among Indian scientific circles has already been conceived. A group of eminent scientists from Institute for Plasma Research is working towards making of a full-fledged fusion reactor capable of producing electricity. Many new features like D-T plasma, Test Blanket Module, Biological shielding and an improved divertor will be incorporated in SST-2. SST-2 will also be built in the Indian state of Gujarat. The land acquisition and other basic formalities have been completed for the same.

== Other fusion reactors ==
Other designs of fusion reactor are DEMO, Wendelstein 7-X, NIF, HiPER, JET (precursor to ITER), and MAST.

== See also ==
- ADITYA (tokamak)
- Megaproject
- Fusion for Energy, EU organisation managing ITER
- Nuclear power in India
