= Kedareswar Banerjee =

Indian physicist (1900–1975)

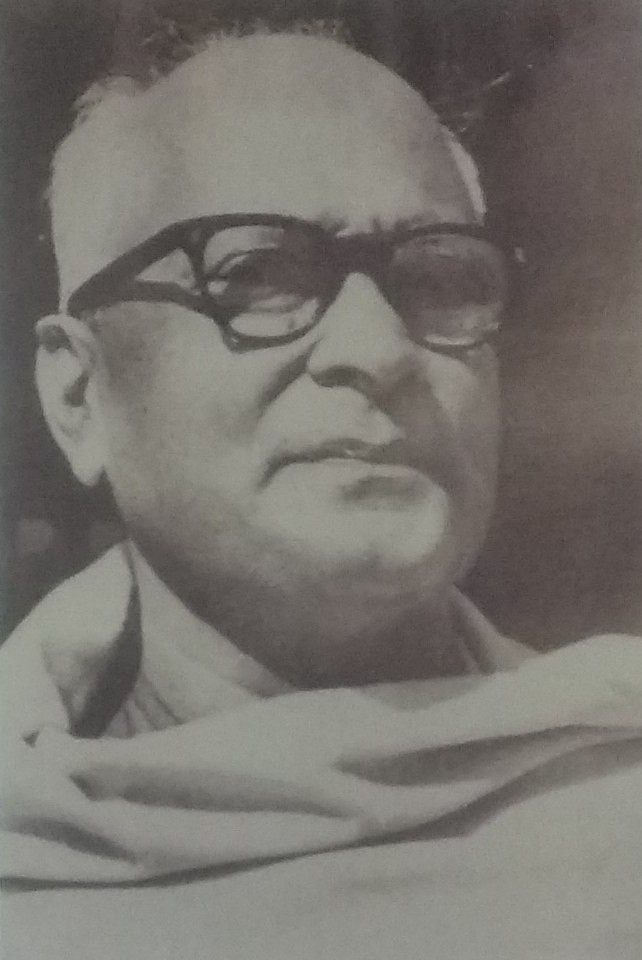
- Born: 15 September 1900; Sthal, Bikrampur, British India (now in Bangladesh)
- Died: 30 April 1975 (aged 74); Barasat, Calcutta, West Bengal, India
- Education: University of Calcutta
- Known for: X-ray Crystallographic
- Scientific career
- Fields: X-ray crystallography
- Workplaces: University of Allahabad; India Meteorological Department; University of Dhaka; Indian Association for the Cultivation of Science
- Notable students: Shri Krishna Joshi

Kedareswar Banerjee (15 September 1900 – 30 April 1975) was an X-ray crystallographer and director of the Indian Association for the Cultivation of Science, Kolkata. Early in his career he determined the structures of naphthalene and anthracene. In 1931, he worked with Sir William Henry Bragg and developed one of the first direct methods of crystal structure determination. He was Professor of Physics at the Indian Association for the Cultivation of Science from 1943 to 1952 and Director of the Association from 1959 until his retirement in 1965. Between 1952 and 1959 he was Head of the Department of Physics at Allahabad University. His interests in crystallography were widespread and, with his death, India has lost a renowned teacher. K. Banerjee joined the research group of Sir C. V. Raman at the Indian Association for the Cultivation of Science (IACS), Calcutta, a premier Indian research institute of India. He worked in various institutions including IACS, the India Meteorological Department, University of Dhaka and Allahabad University and finally retired as the Director of IACS, Calcutta in 1965. Prof. Banerjee explained some points of crystal research to Homi J. Bhabha (21 Dec 1956) also.

== Honors and awards ==
Allahabad University honoured Banerjee by establishing an atmospheric and ocean science centre in his name, K. Banerjee Centre of Atmospheric and Ocean Studies in 2000.

He was elected Fellow of The National Academy of Sciences, India and Indian Academy of Sciences. He was the sectional President for Physical Science Group at the Indian Science Congress in 1947, vice-president of NASc during 1958–1960 and General President NASc in 1967. He was a member of the first National Commission for Cooperation with UNESCO during 1947–1951, a member of the Scientific Advisory Committee of the Planning Commission (India) during 1953–1956 and a member of the review committees and advisory boards of several national laboratories. In 1948, he was invited as a 'Guest of Honour' to the Inaugural Conference and General Assembly of the International Union of Crystallography.

== As first crystallographer of India ==
Banerjee laid the foundation of X-ray Crystallographic research in India. In 1924, when only a few crystal structures had been determined throughout the world, Banerjee's work on the determination of atomic arrangements in crystalline naphthalene and anthracene received international attention. Banerjee was awarded the DSc degree of the University of Calcutta in 1930. He had close associations with almost all the leading crystallographers of his time including William Henry Bragg, William Lawrence Bragg, Paul Peter Ewald, John Desmond Bernal, Nikolay Vasilyevich Belov, J. M. Robertson, K. Lonsdale and Melvin Avrami (who known for his Avrami equation of phase transition). In 1933, Banerjee proposed a new approach to the crystallographic phase problem, which not only broke new ground beyond the 'trial and error' structure solution method of that time, but also heralded the extremely powerful direct methods of crystallography of the modern era. His seminal paper (Proc. Roy. Soc., 1933, 141, 188) on direct methods was cited in the Nobel Lecture of Dr. Jerome Karle in 1985. Apart from structural X-ray crystallography, Banerjee's research pursuits covered a wide field of crystal physics. His research contributions in various fields including low angle scattering, thermal diffuse scattering of X-rays from crystals, diffraction of X-rays by liquids., jute fibre and organic polymers, structures of coal and glass, determination of the elastic constants of crystals by X-rays, theoretical modelling of the vibrational spectra of crystal lattices and some topics in crystal optics have received international recognition. Prof. Banerjee established several research groups at the institutions where he worked. Many of the students he trained continued his research methods in their own careers. Along with his scientific work, he was known for his personal character and for maintaining his professional beliefs. His career included work with the international scientific community.

== Personal life ==
He was born in Bengali Brahmin family on 15 September 1900 in Sthal (Pabna), Vikrampur Dacca (now in Bangladesh). He was educated at Jubilee School, Dacca, and then at the well-known Rajabazar Science College campus of University of Calcutta, for his postgraduate, and doctoral degrees in science. His thesis was " Some Problems in Structures of Solid and Liquids" (Cl. V. Raman). He was a reader in physics at the University of Dhaka (1934–43), and a professor of physics at the Indian Association for the Cultivation of Science, in Calcutta (1943–62), a professor of physics at Allahabad University (1952–69), and a director of the Indian Association for the Cultivation of Science. He died on 30 April 1975 at Barasat, a suburb of Calcutta. Kedareswar stands for "Lord Shiva" in Bengali.
