= St. Mary's English High School, Guwahati =

School in Assam, India

Location
- M.C Road, Near Guwahati Club; Guwahati; India; 26.1861°N 91.7584°E

Information
- Type: Private
- Established: 1924; 102 years ago
- Founder: Salesians of Don Bosco
- Principal: Sr. Jessy Nedumala
- Affiliation: Secondary Education Board of Assam
- Website: stmarysguwahati.com

St. Mary's Higher Secondary School, established in 1924, is one of the oldest schools in Assam, India. It is situated in M.C. Road, Guwahati. The school is affiliated to Secondary Education Board of Assam. Sr. Jessy Nedumala is the current principal.

== History ==
When the school was established in 1924, it was managed by six sisters - Sr. Innocenza Vallino, Sr. Cecilia Da Roit, Sr. Clotilde Appiano, Sr. Maria Bricarello, Sr. Rosetti Antonietta and Sr. Giulia Berra.

== Past superiors ==
- Sr. Innocenza Vallino
- Sr. Maria Avio
- Sr. Clotilde Appiano
- Sr. Luigina Saletta
- Sr. Clotilde Appiano
- Sr. Teresa Villa
- Sr. Francesca Martina
- Sr. Severina Schiapparelli
- Sr. Clotilde Appiano
- Sr. Cleofe Fassa
- Sr. Margaret Greppi
- Sr. Lydia Dias
- Sr. Rosy Devassy
- Sr. Margaret Greppi
- Sr. Rosy Devassy
- Sr. Mary Mampilly
- Sr. Celine Michael
- Sr. Annie Adichirayil
- Sr. Alphonsa Kurisinkal
- Sr. Lucy Rose Ozhukayil
- Sr. Grace Ottalankal
- Sr. Bridget Chittappanattu

== Past Headmistresses/Principals ==
- Sr. Catherine Susngi
- Sr. Lydia Dias
- Sr. Maria Rodrigues
- Sr. Rosy Devassy
- Sr. Anna Varkey
- Sr. Beatrice Gonsalves
- Sr. Mary George
- Sr. Bridget Kurian
- Sr. Mary Parekatt
- Sr. Ivy D’Souza
- Sr. Elizabeth Joseph
- Sr. Teresa Kurian
- Sr. Elizabeth George
- Sr. Celine Porinchu
- Sr. Catherine Kanannampuzha
- Sr. Tessy Davis
- Sr. Annie Villuviruthil
- Sr. Lucy Nedumala
- Sr. Jessy Nedumala
- Sr. (Dr) Molly Kaniampadickal
- Sr. Kathreena Kannapuzha

== Notable alumni ==
- Riniki Bhuyan Sarma
- Monalisa Baruah Mehta

== External Website ==
- Official website of St. Mary's Higher Secondary School, Chenikuthi, Guwahati
