= Kamal Kumari Foundation =

Indian charitable trust

The Kamal Kumari Foundation
- Abbreviation: KKF
- Formation: 1990
- Type: National Charity organization
- Purpose: Promoting Science & Technology, Art & Culture and Journalism
- Headquarters: 113 Park Street; 9th Floor; Kolkata-700016
- Location: Assam
- Region served: India
- Website: Official website

The Kamal Kumari Foundation is a charitable trust in Assam established in 1990 by noted Indian entrepreneur, tea planter and philanthropist Hemendra Prasad Barooah in the fond memory of his mother Kamal Kumari Barooah, the remarkable matriarch of the Khongiya Barooah family of Thengal, Assam. It has been able to achieve acclaim and is renowned in the entire North eastern region of India for its charitable and constructive activities.

== Activities ==
Since its inception, the foundation has been actively participating in the promotion of various fields that includes

- Restoring Namghars and Satriya Cultural Centres in various parts of Assam
- Building and renovating public facilities
- Sponsoring meritorious students in national institutions of repute
- Instituting scholarships for handicapped and needy students
- Offering medical aid to the needy
- Financially assisting publication of rare Assamese literary works

Besides the foundation has also borne the full cost of publication of the volume "150 years of Journalism in Assam" which was brought out by the Celebration Committee of 150 years of Journalism in Assam.

== Awards ==
The foundation confers three national awards annually to individual or group with an objective to promote excellence in the field of Science & Technology, Art & Culture and Journalism. The awards are

- Kamal Kumari National Award for excellence in Art & Culture and Science & Technology
- Siva Prasad Barooah National Award for excellence in Journalism

Each award carries Rs 2 lakh, a trophy, a chadar and a citation.

== See also ==
- Kamal Kumari Barooah
- Siva Prasad Barooah
- Kamal Kumari National Award
- Siva Prasad Barooah National Award
