= Riniki Bhuyan Sarma =

Indian businesswoman and spouse of the current Chief Minister of Assam

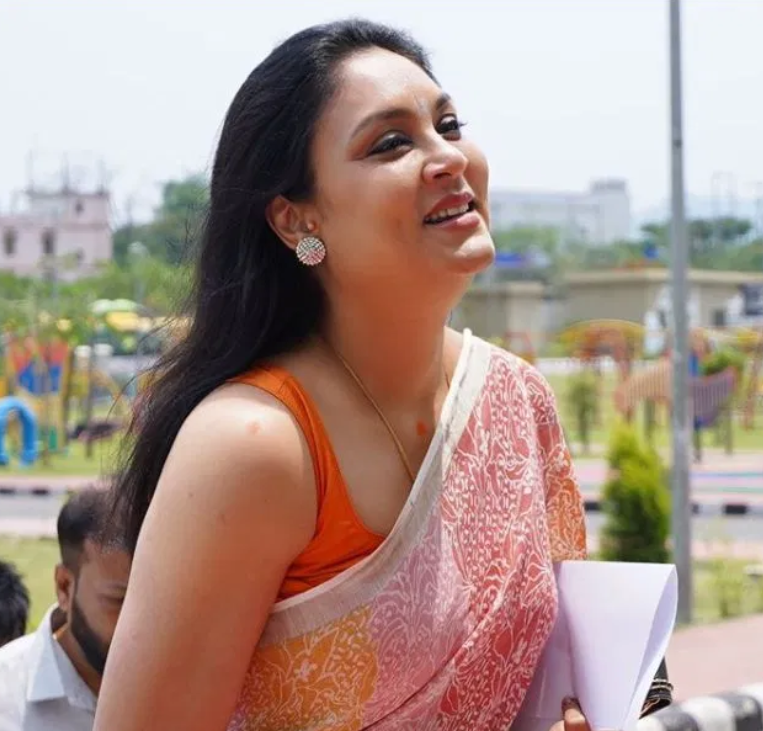
- Born: 31 July 1973 (age 53); Guwahati, Assam, India
- Education: Cotton College (BA); Government Law College (LLB)
- Occupation: Businesswoman
- Organization(s): News Live; Rang; Ramdhenu; Indradhanu; North East Live; Time8
- Spouse: Himanta Biswa Sarma (m. 2001)
- Children: 2

Riniki Bhuyan Sarma (born 31 July 1973) is a businesswoman. She is the wife of Himanta Biswa Sarma, the current chief minister of Assam and managing director of Pride East Entertainment, the largest media house of Assam.

== Early life ==
She was born on 31 July 1973, in Guwahati. She comes from a notable family, with her father, Jadav Chandra Bhuyan, being a well-known industrialist. Riniki's early education took place in Guwahati, where she attended St. Mary's High School before moving on to Cotton College, where she graduated with a degree in Political Science. Following her undergraduate studies, she pursued a law degree at Government Law College in Guwahati.

== Career ==
She is the Chairperson and Managing Director of Pride East Entertainments, which is a parent company of several Assamese channels. It includes, two news channels (News Live & Northeast East Live), three entertainment channels (Ramdhenu, Rang & Indradhanu) and one Assamese News paper (Niyamiya Barta).

Recently, Pride East Entertainments Pvt. Ltd., headed by Riniki Bhuyan Sarma, successfully acquired the digital news platform Time8.

She is also the proprietor of JCB Industries, makers of Aadya brand of sanitary products.

== Personal life ==
She is married to Himanta Biswa Sarma, Assam's current Chief Minister. They met as students while studying in Cotton College, and Himanta shared his ambition of becoming Chief Minister with her. They have two children: a son, Nandil Biswa Sarma, and a daughter, Sukanya Sarma.

== Allegation of corruption ==
In September 2023, Congress alleged that Riniki Bhuyan Sarma, through her company M/s Pride East Entertainments Private Limited, had allegedly obtained a grant of ₹10 crore under the Pradhan Mantri Kisan Sampada Yojana (PMKSY).

Riniki Bhuyan Sarma denied the allegations, claiming that her company had neither applied for nor received any subsidies, even though it was eligible. She also filed a ₹10 crore defamation lawsuit against Gaurav Gogoi, accusing him of running a "slanderous campaign" against her business. Gogoi cited Lok Sabha Unstarred Question No. 3434 as evidence, which lists M/s Pride East Entertainments Private Limited as one of the 79 projects approved under the Infrastructure for Agro-processing Clusters (APC) sub-scheme of PMKSY, subsequent to issuing an "Expression of Interest (EoI) on 21.06.2022 for inviting proposals from prospective entrepreneurs." The project cost of M/s Pride East Entertainments Private Limited is listed as Rs. 25.877 crores and the grant approved on 10.11.2022 is Rs. 10 crores.

== Allegations of Foreign Passport and foreign assets ==
On 5 April 2026, a few days before the 2026 Assembly Elections, Congress Spokesman Pawan Khera made the following allegations against Riniki Bhuyan and her husband, Chief Minister Himanta Biswa Sarma:

1. That she held multiple foreign passports, purportedly belonging to United Arab Emirates, Antigua and Barbuda, and Egypt; an Indian citizen cannot hold foreign passports as Indian law does not permit dual citizenship.
2. That she held 2 separate properties in Dubai, United Arab Emirates.
3. That she was in possession of around Rs. 52,000 crores' worth of assets in the name of a firm named “Riniki Bhuyan Sarma Asset Collective LLC” registered in Wyoming, a state of the United States of America.

Both Riniki Bhuyan and her husband immediately reacted by rejecting these allegations through their respective social media posts, calling them “malicious, fabricated and politically motivated”, while talking of immediately initiating criminal and civil defamation proceedings. While Sarma wrote on X, formerly Twitter- "He will be held fully accountable for his reckless and defamatory statements", Riniki said- "I will now be letting the law take over. Criminal charges are being initiated."

=== Corruption allegations against wife ===
On 5 April 2026, in the midst of 2026 Assembly Elections, Congress Spokesperson Pawan Khera made allegations against Sarma and his wife Riniki Bhuyan, including that his wife held multiple passports, foreign properties, and a foreign company listed in the United States. Kheda alleged his wife held three passports additional to an Indian passport, including the United Arab Emirates, Antigua and Barbuda, and Egypt. She was also accused of owning two properties in Dubai and having Rs. 52,000 crores worth of assets in a firm named, Riniki Bhuyan Sarma Asset Collective LLC, registered in the state of Wyoming.

Both Biswa Sarma and Riniki Bhuyan immediately reacted by rejecting these allegations as “malicious, fabricated and politically motivated”.

While Himanta presented a detailed point by point rebuttal of the charges, calling the documents AI generated and alleging the entire matter to have Pakistan connection, his wife getting an FIR registered against Pawan Khera at Crime Branch of Panbazar Police Station in Guwahati.

Khera initially approached the Telangana High Court, which on April 10, 2026 granted him one week's transit anticipatory bail to enable him to seek regular relief before the competent court in Assam. On April 15, the Supreme Court of India stayed the operation of the transit anticipatory bail. Following this, Khera moved the Gauhati High Court seeking anticipatory bail. The High Court rejected the plea, holding that custodial interrogation was necessary to ascertain the source of the documents relied upon by Khera. Later The Supreme Court granted anticipatory bail to Khera.

While the matter is still pending, Himanta seems to have changed his stand and is calling the entire episode political in nature, even thanking Khera for allegedly contributing in Congress defeat.

Meanwhile in May 2026, Pawan Khera was questioned by Assam Crime Branch for long hours continuously for two days, while he has been called for questioning the third time, and other Congress leaders like Randeep Surjewala have also been called for questioning.
