= The Shillong Times =

English-language newspaper in Meghalaya, India

- Type: Daily newspaper
- Format: Broadsheet
- Founder: Sudhindra Bhushan Chaudhuri
- Editor: Patricia Mukhim (2008–present); Manas Chaudhuri (till 1978–2008); P. N. Chaudguri (1961–1978); Sudhindra Bhushan Chaudhuri (1945–1961)
- Founded: 1945; 81 years ago
- Political alignment: Neutral
- Language: English
- Headquarters: The Shillong Times Pvt. Ltd. Rilbong, Shillong-4. Meghalaya, India.
- Sister newspapers: Salantini Janera (Garo); Sangbad Lahari (Bengali)
- Website: theshillongtimes.com
- Free online archives: epaper.theshillongtimes.com

The Shillong Times is an Indian newspaper. It is North-East India's oldest English-language daily newspaper founded by Sudhindra Bhusan Chaudhuri, which started as a tabloid-sized weekly on 10 August 1945, on a treadle machine in Shillong. In 1961, P. N. Chaudguri became the editor-proprietor, followed by his son Manas Chaudhuri on 1 April 1978, a Padma Shree awardee.

The Shillong Times switched to a modern computer typesetting and offset printing technique on 15 August 1991, and the first issue in broadsheet format came into being.

A second edition from the town of Tura in the Garo Hills of Meghalaya was launched on 9 November 1992.

Besides the Tura edition, Shillong Times Private Limited also publishes the only Garo language daily Salantini Janera since January 1993. The Bengali language daily Sangbad Lahari began publishing from Guwahati in June 2009.

The publication is headed by Patricia Mukhim as its editor, who succeeded Manas Chaudhuri in 2008.
