= Amita Malik =

Indian film critic

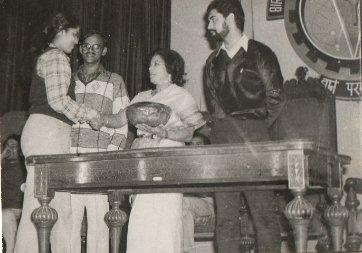
- Amita Malik Chief Guest at OASIS (CUSAT), 1983
- Born: 1921; Guwahati, Assam, India
- Died: 20 February 2009 (age 87); New Delhi, India
- Occupations: Film and television critic
- Awards: Kamal Kumari National Award; B.D. Goenka Journalism Award 1992

Amita Malik (1921 – 20 February 2009) was an Indian media critic. She was described by Time magazine as India's "most prominent film and television critic," dubbed the "first lady of Indian media" and "India's best known cinema commentator". She began her career at All India Radio in 1944 and later worked as a columnist for many Indian newspapers, including The Statesman, The Times of India, the Indian Express and Pioneer. She died of leukemia at the age of 87 at Kailas Hospital on 20 February 2009.

== Childhood ==
Amita Malik was born in 1921, in Guwahati, Assam.

The first film she ever saw was The Gold Rush by Charlie Chaplin, screened by the nuns of Loreto Convent Shillong.

== Career ==
In 1944, Malik joined All India Radio at Lucknow. She presented the weekly lunch hour programme of European music on Saturdays. The same year, she applied for the advertised post of programme assistant and was posted to All India Radio's Delhi station.

Amita Malik was the first reporter to interview Indira Gandhi when she unexpectedly became Prime Minister of India after Lal Bahadur Shastri's death in Tashkent.

Malik was awarded the first fellowship of the Canadian Women's Press Club which arranged accommodation for her with their members for 10 months in 1960. Among others, she interviewed Satyajit Ray, Elia Kazan, Akira Kurosawa, Marlon Brando, David Niven, and Alfred Hitchcock.

In 1960, Malik launched a campaign against foreigners in saris. "If there is anything uglier than an Indian matron in bulging jeans," she said, "it is a white woman. Tall, angular and with straw-colored hair, wearing a Dacca sari. Foreign wives fondly imagine that they look beautiful in saris, when they would look miles better in gingham."

=== Removal of restrictions on foreign press during Emergency ===
Amita Malik was responsible for getting the censorship curbs on foreign media during the Indian Emergency lifted.

=== Campaigns against misuse of media ===
In 1989 she launched a campaign against the misuse of India's state-owned media which had been converted into the private organ of the Indian National Congress party to promote Rajiv Gandhi.

=== Feud with Khushwant Singh ===
Khushwant Singh said that Malik had once written he was the worst dressed man she had ever known. He confessed it was the only time he genuinely agreed with her.

=== Syndicated column (Sight and Sound) ===
Amita's syndicated column "Sight and Sound" has been published in virtually every leading Indian newspaper at various times. Her column was read by generations of television news readers for Amita's biting sartorial observations on them. At the same time she strongly defended AIR and Doordarshan's underpaid staff who worked under political and bureaucratic pressure.

==== Memorable quotes from Sight and Sound ====
1. "One can certainly give credit to Doordarshan for one thing: It keeps whatever good programmes it has as secret as possible."
2. "Much as I appreciate Barkha Dutt's energy and enthusiasm, sometimes I get disturbed by her popping up all too frequently here, there and everywhere."
3. "The programme called Cook Na Kaho was hosted by Upen Patel and what Patel was doing revolted me. Like most Indians I believe in jootha, that is, not polluting food personally with fingers or spoon when it is meant for all. Not for any religious sentiments but because it is unhygienic and can spread infection. What Patel was doing was putting a fork into the ice-cream, licking it and putting it back into the ice-cream. Sorry Patel, but I would not eat your food after that."

== Books ==
- Amita, no holds barred: An autobiography Hardcover – January 1, 1999

== Awards ==
- Kamal Kumari National Award
- B.D.Goenka Award in Journalism 1992
- Hony. Fellowship of International Police Association
