= News Live (Indian TV channel) =

Assamese TV channel

- Logo used since 2008
- Country: India
- Broadcast area: India and Worldwide
- Headquarters: News Live Building, G.S. Road, Christian Basti, Guwahati, Assam, India

Programming
- Language: Assamese
- Picture format: 576i SDTV

Ownership
- Owner: Pride East Entertainments Pvt. Ltd.
- Key people: Riniki Bhuyan Sharma (Chairperson); Syed Zarir Hussain (Managing Director)
- Sister channels: Rang; Ramdhenu; Indradhanu; North East Live; Time8

History
- Launched: 21 January 2008; 18 years ago

Links
- Website: newslivetv.com

News Live is a 24-hour Indian Assamese-language satellite news channel broadcasting news, current affairs and infotainment programmes. It is owned by Pride East Entertainments Pvt Ltd, a Guwahati based media group whose majority stake is owned by Riniki Bhuyan Sarma, wife of Assam Chief Minister Himanta Biswa Sarma. News Live has the highest viewership among all Assamese news channels.

== Assamese of the Year ==
"Assamese of the Year" is an annual award presented by News Live. It carries a citation and 2 lakh Indian Rupees. The winner for this awards are:

- 2009: Arnab Goswami
- 2011: Jahnu Barua
- 2012: Shiva Thapa
- 2013: Gunaram Khanikar
- 2014: Adil Hussain
- 2015: Angaraag Mahanta (Papon)

== Programming ==
Current Programmes

- Breakfast Live
- Deoboriya Adda
- Kotha Barta
- Good Morning Assam
- Guwahati Live
- Prekhyapot
- Noixo Guwahati
- Talk Time

== See also ==
- List of Assamese-language television channels
- Rang
- Ramdhenu
- Indradhanu
