= Siva Prasad Barooah National Award =

- Civilian award for contributions to Journalism
- Awarded for: Given to individuals and groups for outstanding contribution to Journalism in India.
- Sponsored by: The Kamal Kumari Foundation
- Reward: Rs. 2 lakh
- First award: 1999
- Final award: 2008

Highlights
- Total awarded: 12
- First winner: The Assam Tribune
- Last winner: Amab Goswami
- Website: kkfindia.org

The Siva Prasad Barooah National Award is an Indian award given to individuals and groups in India for outstanding contribution to journalism, to promote news media excellence. It was instituted by the Kamal Kumari Foundation in 1999 in memory of Siva Prasad Barooah, the renowned tea-planter, philanthropist, politician, humanist and also the publisher of Batori, the first Assamese daily newspaper in Assam. He belongs to the famous Khongiya Barooah family of Thengal, Assam. The first award went to The Assam Tribune. The award carries a cash award of ₹2 lakh (equivalent to ₹2.6 lakh or US$2,700 in 2026), a trophy, a Chadar and a citation.

== List of Awardees ==
Year	Awardee	Associated	Ref
1999	The Assam Tribune		
1999	T. G. Baruah		
1999	P. G. Baruah		
2000	Sanjoy Hazarika		
2001	Dhirendra Nath Bezboruah		
2002	Teesta Setalvad		
2003	Prannoy Roy		
2004	Arup Kumar Dutta		
2005			
2006	Prafulla Chandra Barua	Executive Trustee, Media Trust, Assam	
2007	Patricia Mukhim	Editor, Shillong Times	
2008	Arnab Goswami	Editor-in-Chief, Times Now	
2009	Radhika Mohan Bhagawati		
2011	M. S. Prabhakara		

== See also ==
- Kamal Kumari Barooah
- Siva Prasad Barooah
- Kamal Kumari National Award
- The Kamal Kumari Foundation
