= Pawan Khera =

Indian politician (born 1968)

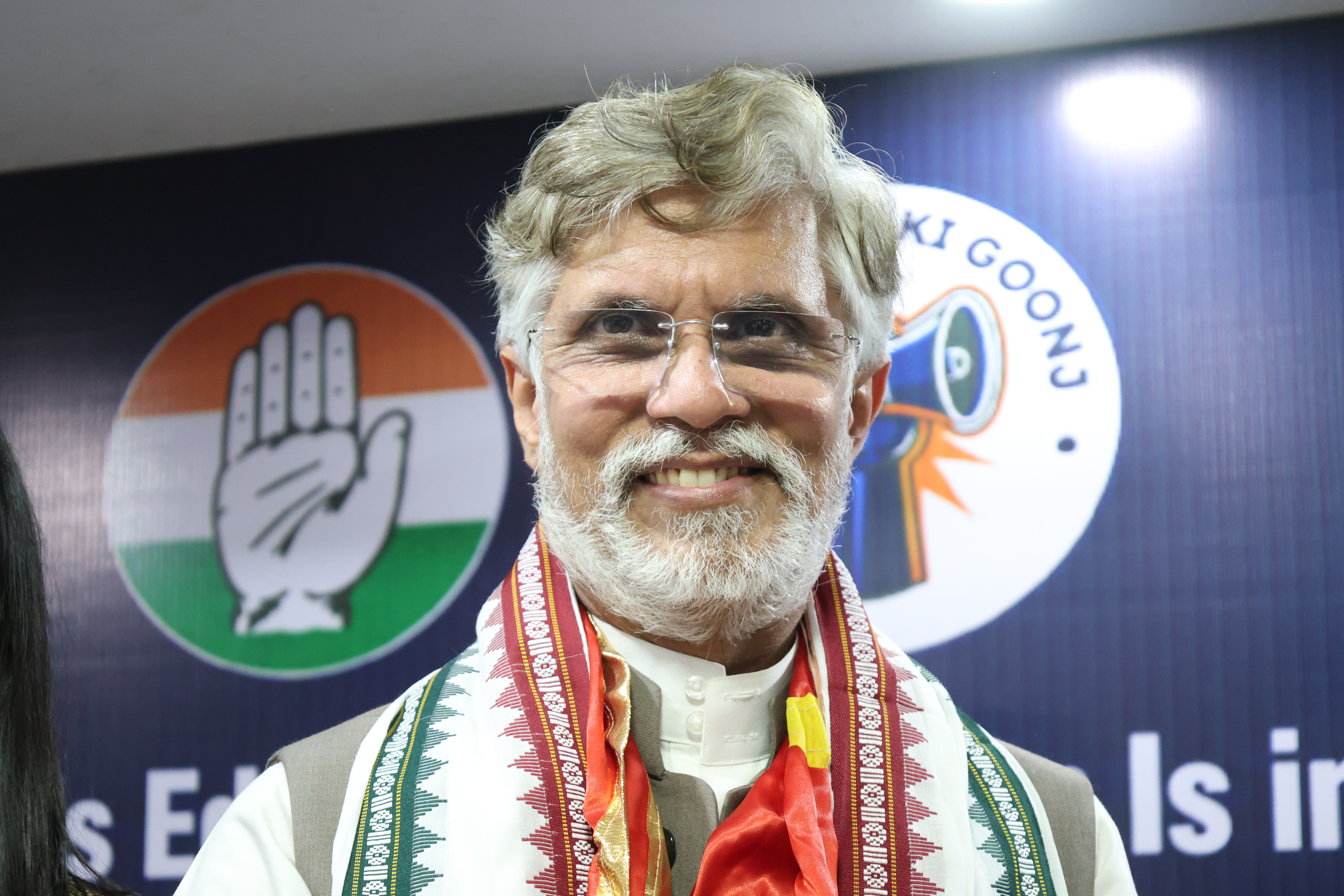
- Khera in 2026

Member of Parliament, Rajya Sabha
- Incumbent
- Assumed office 21 June 2026
- Constituency: Karnataka

Chairman of All India Congress Committee Media and Publicity Department
- Incumbent
- Assumed office 18 June 2022

Personal details
- Born: 31 July 1968 (age 58) Delhi, India
- Party: Indian National Congress
- Spouse: Dr. Kota Neelima
- Occupation: Politician; Journalist; Spokesperson

Pawan Khera (born 31 July 1968) is an Indian politician from the Indian National Congress party. He served as the political advisor to former Delhi Chief Minister Sheila Dikshit. He is a Member of parliament in Rajya Sabha since June 2026. He is the chairman of the media and publicity wing of the Indian National Congress party.

Pawan Khera was appointed as a member of the Empowered Action Group of Leaders and Experts (EAGLE), formed by the Indian National Congress on 2 February 2025 to monitor the conduct of free and fair elections by the Election Commission.

== Political career ==
He worked as a social activist before joining as political secretary to former Delhi Chief Minister Sheila Dikshit. Having started his political career in 1989 by joining the Indian Youth Congress but left the party after the assassination of former prime minister Rajiv Gandhi in 1991. He rejoined the Congress in 1998 as the political secretary to firebrand woman leader Sheila Dikshit the future chief minister of New Delhi. Khera held that tenure till 2013. He is considered as a senior public figure in the Congress and has held many key roles in party. Khera is currently the Chairman of Media & Publicity of the All India Congress Committee and a senior spokesperson of the party.

== Dispute over Himanta Biswa Sarma allegations ==
On 5 April 2026, in the midst of 2026 Assembly Elections, Pawan Khera made allegations against Assam Chief Minister Himanta Biswa Sarma and his wife Riniki Bhuyan Sarma, including that his wife held multiple passports, foreign properties, and a foreign company listed in the United States. Khera alleged Riniki Bhuyan Sarma, held three passports additional to an Indian passport, including the United Arab Emirates, Antigua and Barbuda, and Egypt. She was also accused of owning two properties in Dubai and having Rs. 52,000 crores worth of assets in a firm registered in the state of Wyoming.

Both Biswa Sarma and Riniki Bhuyan immediately reacted by rejecting these allegations as “malicious, fabricated and politically motivated”.

This was followed by Himanta's wife getting an FIR registered against Pawan Khera at Crime Branch of Panbazar Police Station in Guwahati.

Khera initially approached the Telangana High Court, which on April 10 2026 granted him one week's transit anticipatory bail to enable him to seek regular relief before the competent court in Assam. On April 15, the Supreme Court of India stayed the operation of the transit anticipatory bail. Following this, Khera moved the Gauhati High Court seeking anticipatory bail. The High Court rejected the plea, holding that custodial interrogation was necessary to ascertain the source of the documents relied upon by Khera. Later The Supreme Court granted anticipatory bail to Khera.

Later in May 2026, Pawan Khera was questioned by Assam Crime Branch for long hours continuously for two days, while he has been called for questioning the third time, and other Congress leaders like Randeep Surjewala have also been called for questioning.

== Personal life ==
Pawan Khera is married to Indian writer and politician Kota Neelima.
