= Sobha Brahma =

Indian painter and sculptor

Sobha Brahma सोभा ब्रह्मा
- Born: 14 October 1929; Gossaigaon, Kokrajhar district, Assam
- Died: 2012; Guwahati, Assam, India
- Known for: Painting and sculpture
- Movement: Modernism

Sobha Brahma (14 October 1929 – 2012) was an Indian painter and sculptor. He lived and worked in Guwahati. He graduated from the Kalabhavana Visva-Bharati University Shantiniketan West-Bengal. Brahma developed a unique individual style that mixed traditional folk and modern Indian art.

He served as the Principal of the Government College Of Arts and Crafts Assam, as the vice-chairman of the prominent cultural centre Srimanta Sankardev Kalakshetra, set up under the Assam Accord, and as a member of the general council of Lalit Kala Akademi.

== Early life and education ==
He received his Art education at Kalabhavan, Visva-Bharti Santiniketan, West Bengal from 1952 to 1957. He trained under several artists, including Nandalal Bose, Dhriendra Krishna Dev Barman and Ramkinkar Baij. In 1956, he participated at the 4th International Art Students Exhibition held in Prague Czechoslovakia.

In his early years, Brahma worked as an art teacher at Tarini Chowdhury HSMP School Guwahati, from 1955 to 1958. He participated in the decoration of the All India Congress session held at Pragjyotishpur in 1958. In 1959, Brahma was awarded a research scholarship by the Department of Tribal Culture and Folklore, Gauhati University. He subsequently made a tour of the tribal areas of the Bodos, Rabhas and Dimasa Kacharis to study their art materials, including their rich collection of variegated fabric designs.

From 1960 onward, Brahma worked as a teacher at the School of Arts and Crafts, Assam, which later became the Government College Of Arts and Crafts Assam. He was principal of the college from 1964 to 1989.

== Contribution ==
Sobha Brahma was renowned as an author, sculptor, and painter throughout the north-eastern states of India . He was able to write in Bodo, Assamese, English, and Bengali. Besides writing essays, biographies, and memoirs, he was also a film director. Brahma translated many important art books into Assamese. His paintings have been featured in numerous solo and group exhibitions internationally. Many of his works were specially showcased in Dacca, Bangladesh; Sofia, Bulgaria; Rome, Italy; and Prague, Czech Republic.

His work is part of collections at the Government Museum, Chandigarh, the Assam State Museum, Lalit Kala Akademi and several government departments in Assam, as well as private collections in Assam, Shillong, Bombay, and Germany.

Silpokalar Navajanma (Assamese Book on Art) is one of his noted creations.

== Honours and awards ==
He was honoured with felicitations from several social, cultural and art educational organizations such as the Assam Sahitya Sabha, the Bodo Sathitya Sabha, Kollol Gisthi of Nangoan, the Artist Guild of Guwahati, the State Bank of India and the Deputy Commissioner's Employees Association of Guwahati. In February 2000, he was artist-in-residence at the Lalit Kala Kendra, Kolkata.

Sobha Brahma was a member of the Central Lalit Kala Akademi, the New Delhi and the Assam Textbook Production Corporation. He served as vice-chairman of the Anundoram Borooah Institute of Language, Art and Culture, Guwahati.

Brahma was honored with the Assam Shilpi Dibash Award in 1977 and the Assam Government Artists pension in 1990. He was awarded the prestigious Kamal Kumari National Award in 1990 and the Assam State Bishnu Rabha Award in 1996.

== Death ==
At the age of 82, Sobha Brahma died at Guwahati following a prolonged illness.

== See also ==
- Kamal Kumari National Award
- Lalit Kala Akademi
- Visva-Bharti Santiniketan
