= Dhirendra Nath Bezbaruah =

Indian journalist

Dhirendra Nath Bezboruah
- Born: 1933 (age 92–93); Jorhat, Assam, India
- Occupations: Journalist; Writer
- Years active: 83
- Known for: Founder editor of The Sentinel
- Spouse: Late Kalpana Bezboruah
- Children: Gayatri Bezboruah, Maitreyi Roy, Bhaskar Bezboruah
- Parent(s): Late Surendra Nath Bezboruah, Late Kamala Bezboruah
- Awards: Padma Shri; B. D. Goenka Award; Katha Award; Nachiketa Samman

Dhirendra Nath Bezboruah is an Indian journalist, writer and the founder editor of The Sentinel, a Guwahati-based English language daily.

== Early life ==
Born in 1933 in the Jorhat district of the northeast Indian state of Assam, he started his career as a lecturer, after completing his post graduate studies at Reading University, UK. When The Sentinel daily was established in 1983, he was selected as the founder editor, a post he held for a number of years. He was associated with the Media Trust, Assam and was the working president of its celebration committee in 1992. The many books he has published from Assamese into English includes The Cavern and Other Stories, a short story anthology written by Bhabendra Nath Saikia. He received the B. D. Goenka Award for Journalism in 1997 and the Nachiketa Samman of Panchjanya weekly in 2001. He is also recipient of Katha Award for translation. The Government of India awarded him the fourth highest civilian honour of the Padma Shri, in 2016, for his contributions to literature.

== See also ==
- The Sentinel
- Bhabendra Nath Saikia
