= Patricia Mukhim =

Indian journalist

- Born: Shillong, Meghalaya, India
- Occupations: Writer, journalist, social activist
- Known for: Social activism, writings
- Awards: Padma Shri; Chameli Devi Jain Award for Outstanding Women Mediapersons; ONE India Award; FICCI FLO Award; UN Brahma Soldier of Humanity Award; Siva Prasad Barooah National Award; North East Excellence Award

Patricia Mukhim is an Indian social activist, writer, journalist and the editor of Shillong Times, known for her social activism. A recipient of honours such as Chameli Devi Jain award, ONE India award, Federation of Indian Chambers of Commerce and Industry FLO award, Upendra Nath Brahma Soldier of Humanity award, Siva Prasad Barooah National award and North East Excellence award, she was honored by the Government of India, in 2000, with the fourth highest Indian civilian award of Padma Shri.

== Biography ==
Patricia Mukhim was born in Shillong, Meghalaya. She had a difficult childhood as her parents divorced when she was young and was brought up by her single mother. She was educated in Shillong, and obtained graduate degrees in Arts (BA) and education (BEd). She started her career as a teacher but turned to journalism in 1987 as a columnist and, since 2008, as the editor of the Shillong Times, the first English-language daily in Meghalaya. She also contributes articles to other publications such as The Statesman, The Telegraph, Eastern Panorama and The North East Times.

Patricia Mukhim is the founder of Shillong, We Care a non-governmental organisation which was involved in the fight against militancy in Meghalaya. She was a member of the National Security Advisory Board of the Government of India and a member of the National Foundation for Communal Harmony, under the Ministry of Home Affairs, India. She is a former member of the Governors of the Indian Institute of Mass Communication.

Mukhim is credited with several articles on the socio-political milieu of Meghalaya. She has contributed a chapter to book on matriarchy by Heide Göttner-Abendroth under the title, Khasi matrilineal society - Challenges in the 21st century and is working on a book, When Hens Crow. She is the author of the book titled Waiting for an Equal World - Gender in India's Northeast.

Patricia Mukhim is a divorcee and has three children, two of her children having died earlier.

== Awards and recognition ==
Patricia Mukhim received the Chameli Devi Jain Award in 1996 from the Media Foundation, New Delhi. The Federation of Indian Chambers of Commerce and Industry (FICCI) conferred on her their FLO award for excellence in journalism in 2008. A few months later, in 2008, she received the Upendra Nath Brahma Soldier of Humanity award. The next year, in 2009, she received the Siva Prasad Barooah National Award. One year later, the Government of India included her in the Republic Day honours list for the civilian award of Padma Shri. In 2011, she was selected for the Northeast Excellence Award. She received the O.N.E. India award in 2014. In 1995, she was honoured with the Chameli Devi Jain Award for Outstanding Women Mediaperson.

== See also ==
- Shillong Times
- National Security Council (India)
