= The Sentinel (India) =

Indian English-language daily newspaper

- Type: Daily newspaper
- Format: Broadsheet
- Owner(s): Omega Printers & Publishers Pvt. Ltd.
- Publisher: Puspa Dhar Deka
- Editor: Shankar Rajkhewa
- Founded: 1983; 43 years ago
- Political alignment: Apolitical
- Language: English
- Headquarters: Sentinel Building, G.S. Road, Six Mile, Guwahati, Assam
- Circulation: 33,017
- Website: sentinelassam.com

The Sentinel is an English daily newspaper launched in 1983 in the city of Guwahati, in the state of Assam, India. It has two editions published simultaneously from Guwahati and Dibrugarh. The Sentinel caters to the entire North Eastern region of India.

As of November 2024, Shankar Rajkhewa is the Managing Editor, and Ramlal Sinha is the Executive Editor.

== History ==
It was first published in 1983 and the founding editor was Dhirendra Nath Bezbaruah. The newspaper was edited for a long time by Bezbaruah, who was also the former president of The Editors Guild of India. Former Assam DGP and litterateur Harekrishna Deka and renowned journalist Gauri Shankar Kalita also were editors of this newspaper at some point of time. When The Sentinel was launched in 1983, all newspapers in the North East were printed on letterpress machines, but The Sentinel was the first daily newspaper in the North East that started off with a combination of phototypesetting and web offset printing.

== Circulation ==
According to Audit Bureau of Circulation(ABC), The Sentinel in combination with its sister publications has the highest circulation in North East India making it the largest publishing house in the North East.

== See also ==
- The Assam Tribune
