= Kamal Kumari National Award =

- Civilian award for contributions to Art, Culture & Literature and Science & Technology
- Awarded for: Art, Culture & Literature, Science & Technology
- Sponsored by: The Kamal Kumari Foundation
- Reward: ₹ 200,000 in cash
- First award: 1991
- Final award: 2012

Highlights
- First winner: Sobha Brahma
- Last winner: Dhiraj Bora; Aisharjya P. Konwar; Pushpa Bhuyan

The Kamal Kumari National Award is an Indian Award given to individuals and groups in India for outstanding contribution to Art, Culture & Literature and Science & Technology. It was instituted by the Kamal Kumari Foundation in 1990 in memory of Kamal Kumari Barooah, the remarkable matriarch of the Khongiya Barooah family of Thengal, Assam. The foundation has till date a number of awardees. The first award was given to Sobha Brahma in 1991 in the category of Culture. The award carries a cash award of Rs. 200,000, a trophy and a citation.

== List of Awardees ==
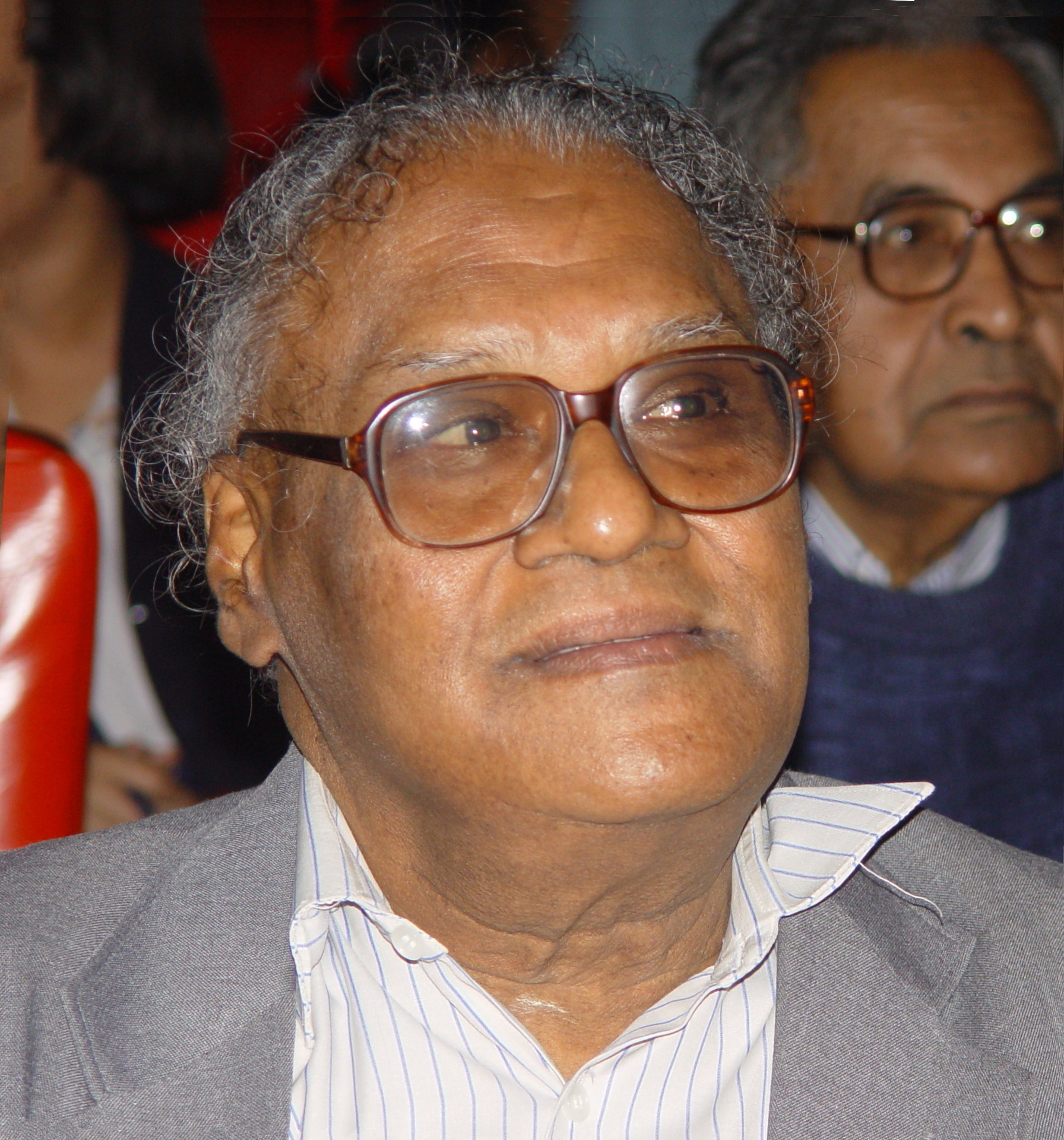
C. N. R. Rao

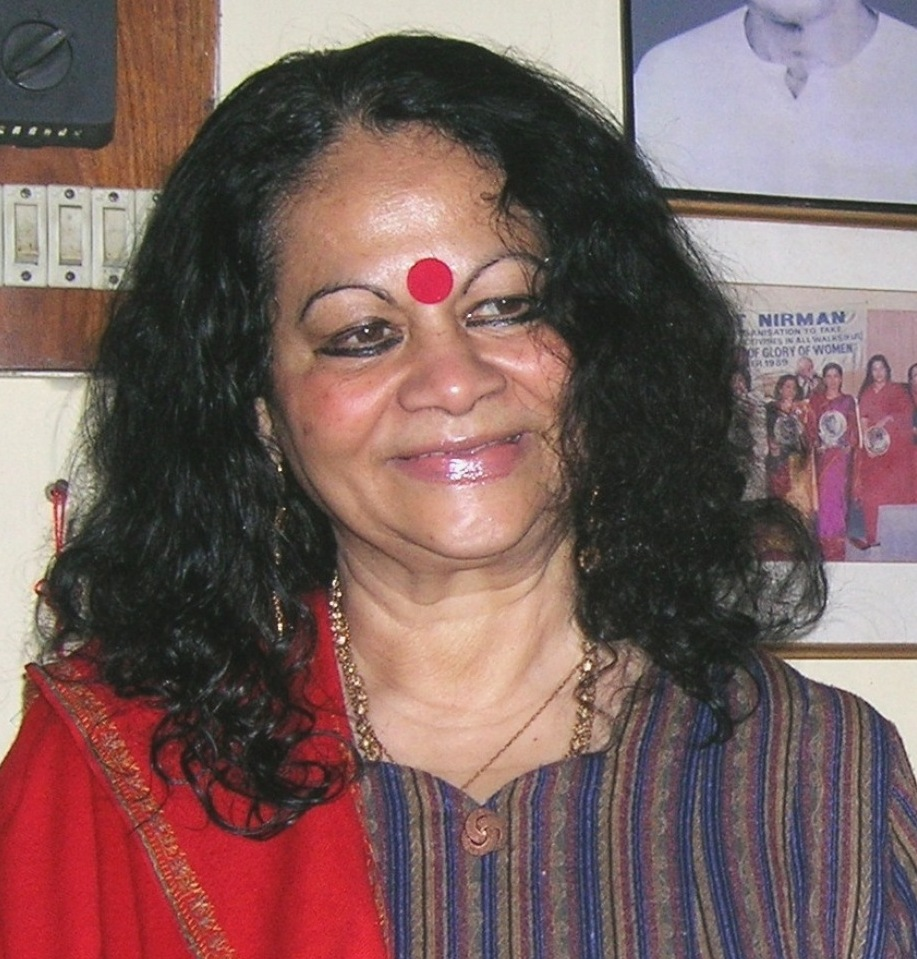
Mamoni Raisom Goswami

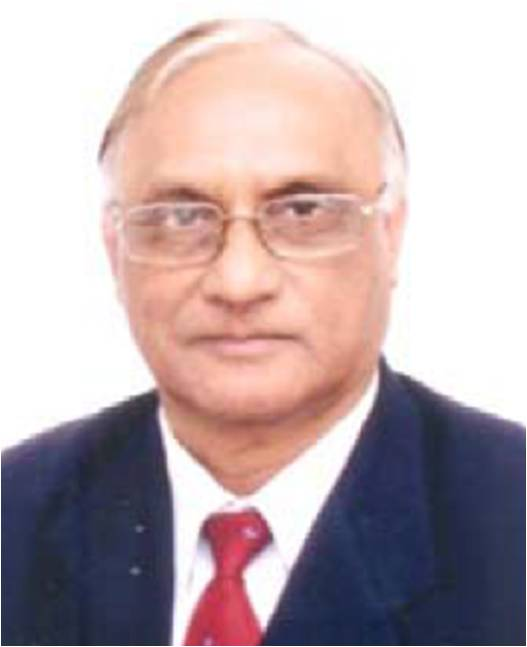
Ramesh C. Deka

Tej P. Singh

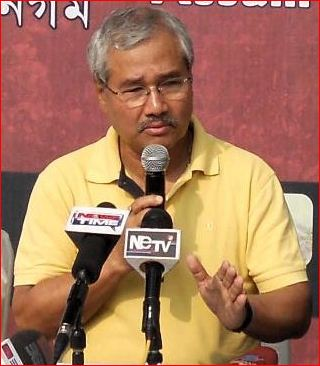
Jahnu Barua

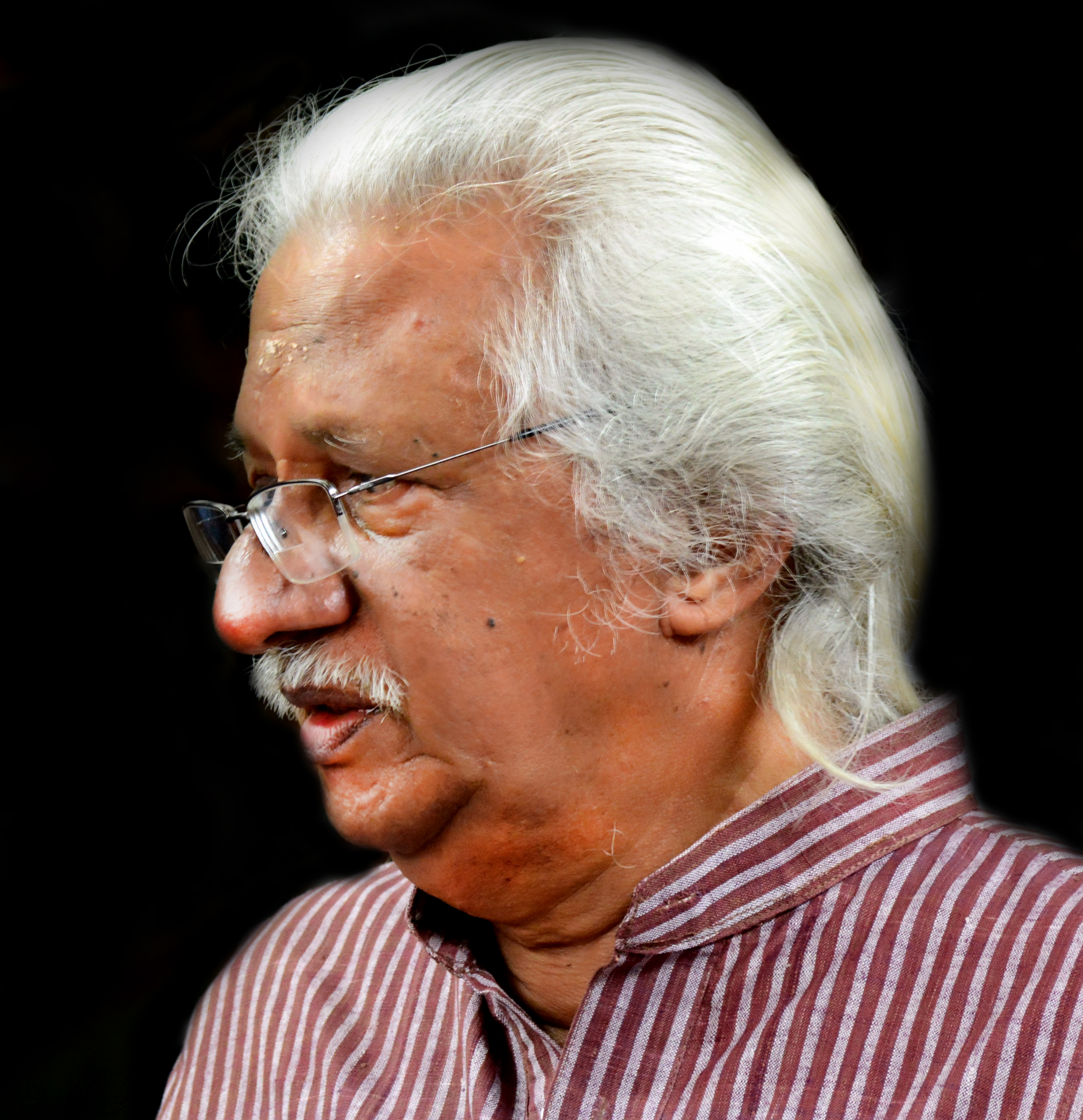
Adoor Gopalakrishnan

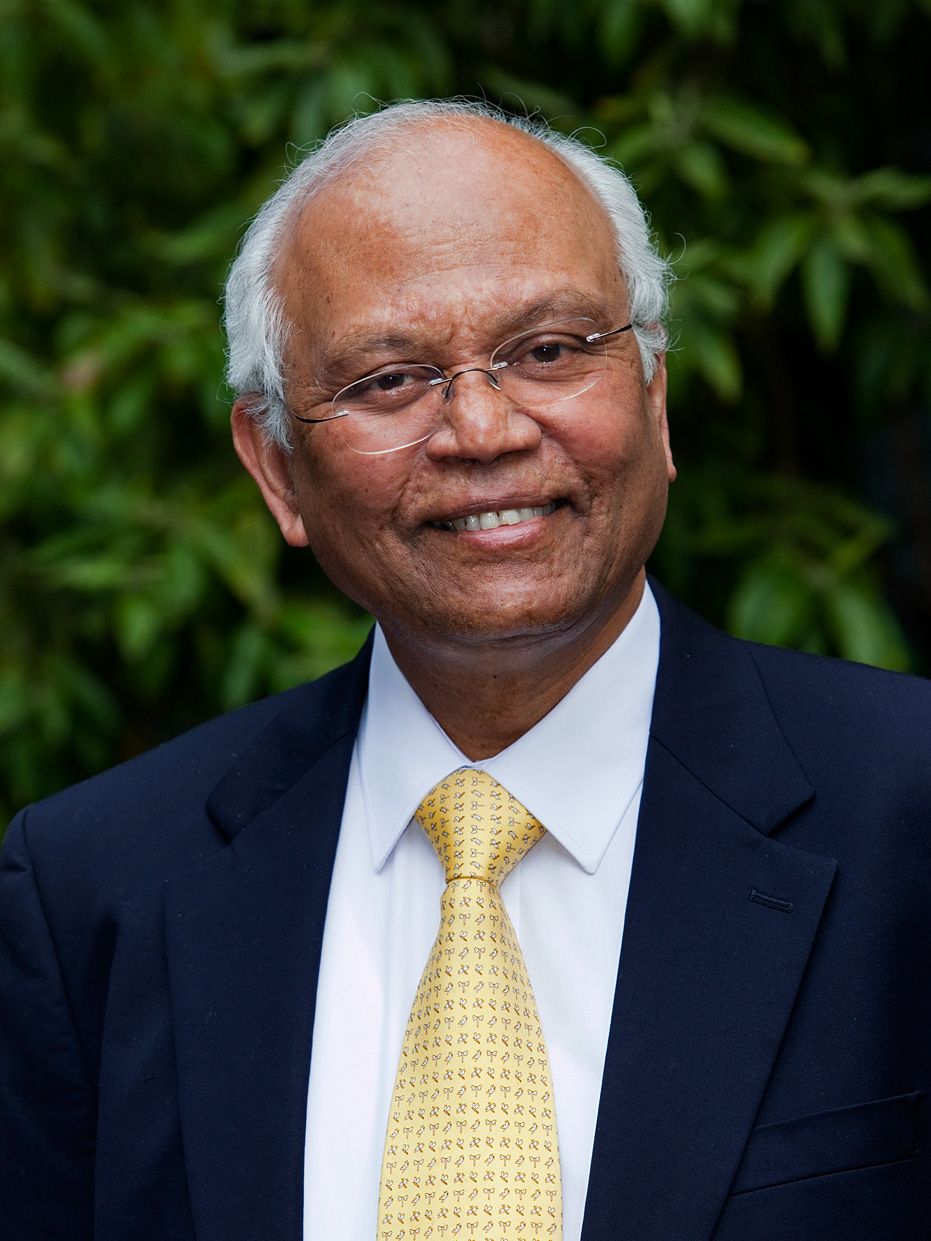
Raghunath Anant Mashelkar

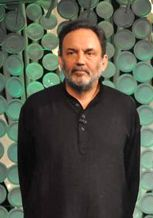
Prannoy Roy

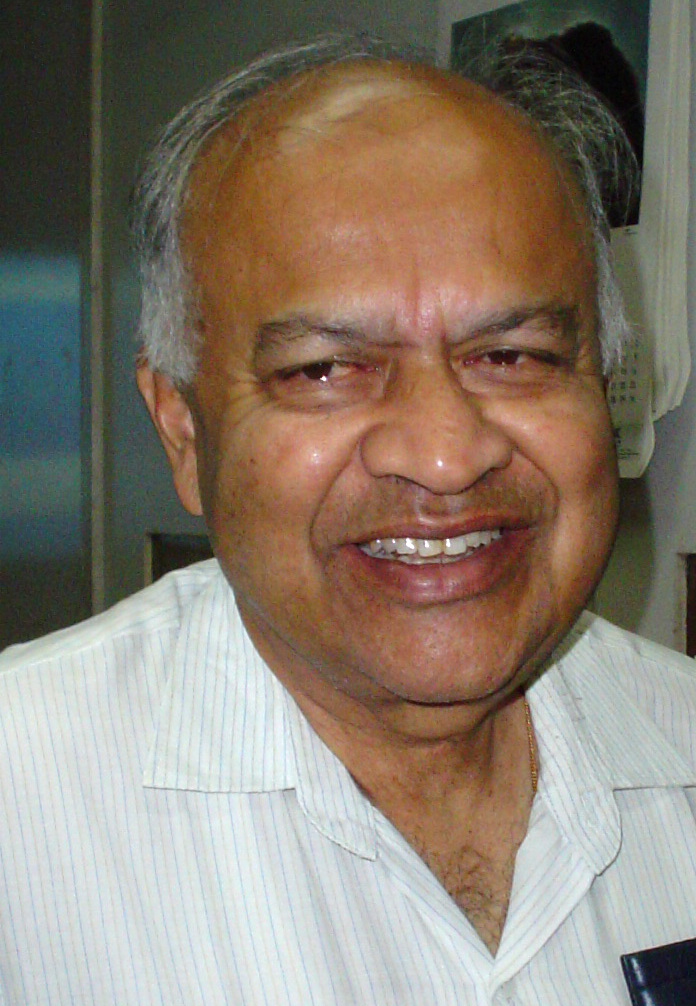
Jayant Narlikar

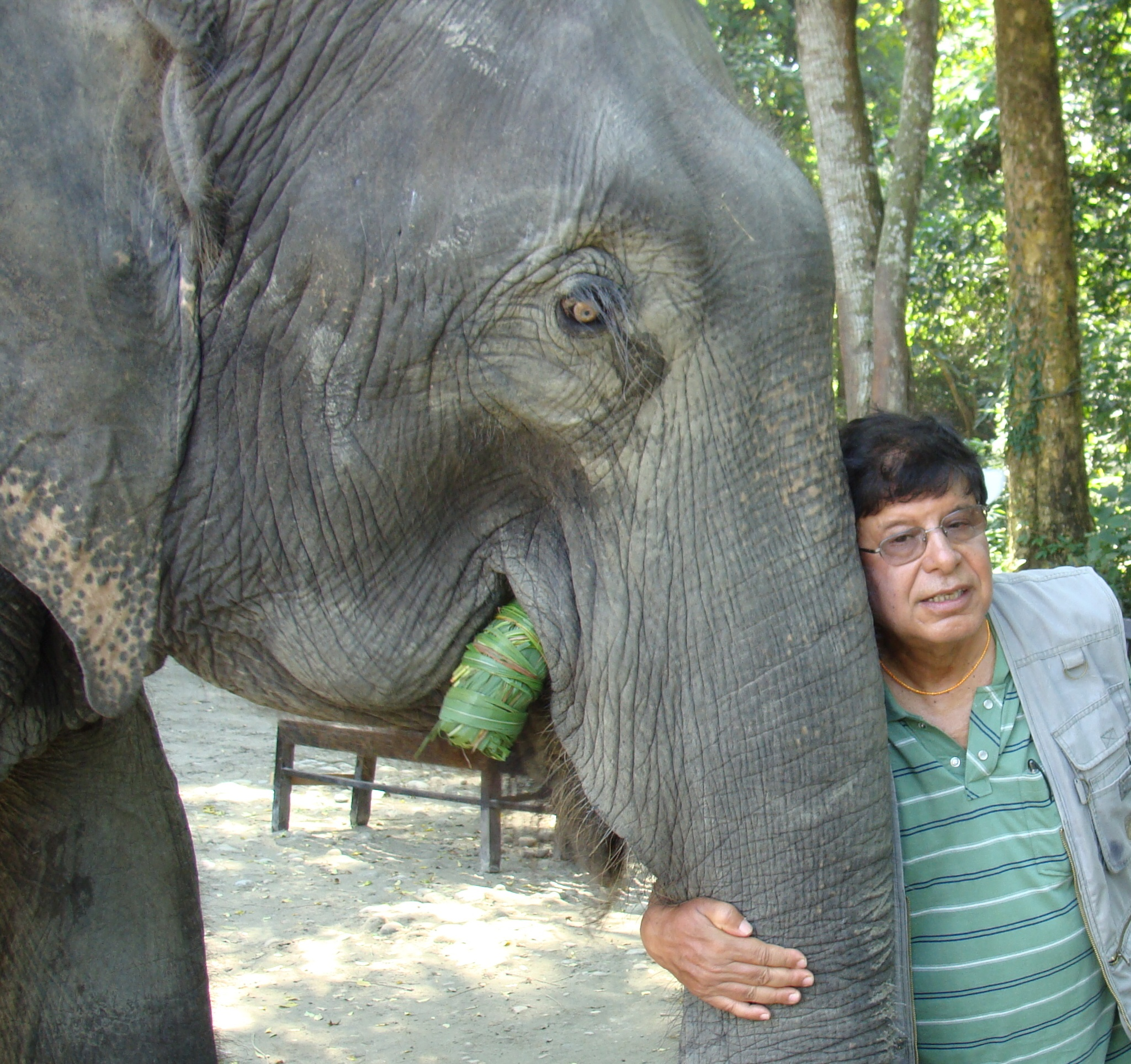
Hemanta Mishra

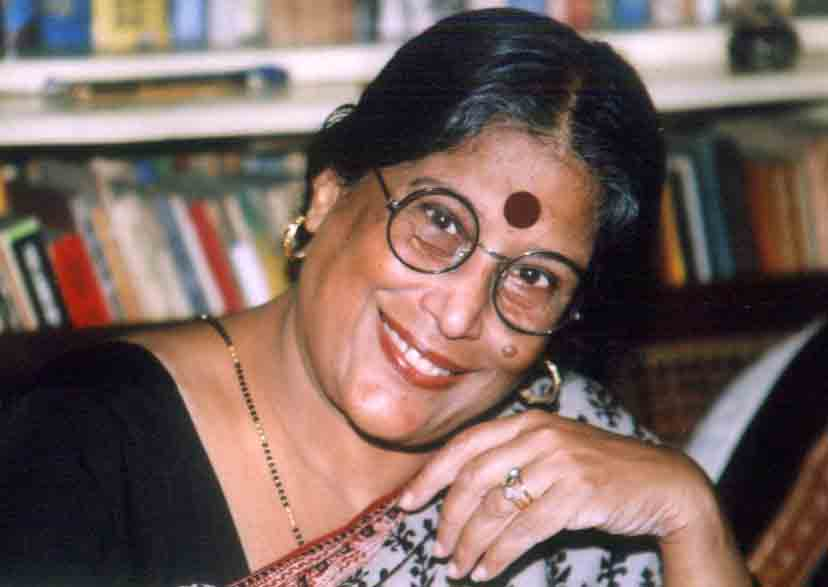
Nabaneeta Dev Sen

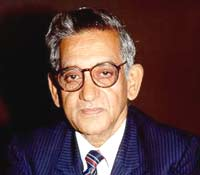
Ramakanta Rath

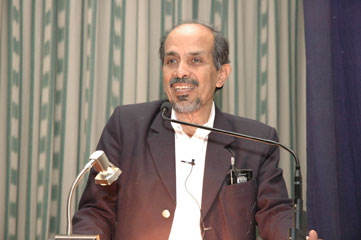
Roddam Narasimha

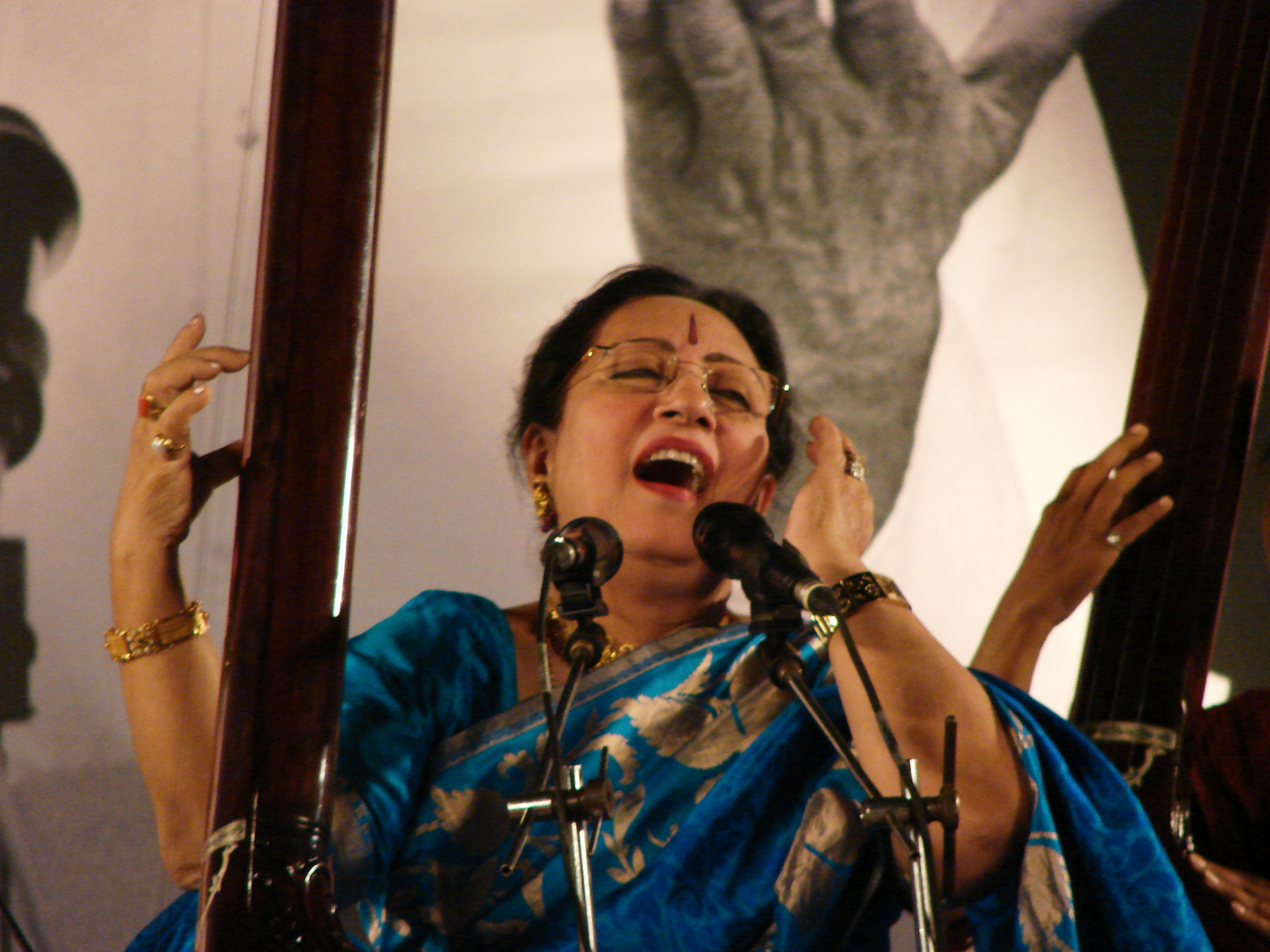
Parveen Sultana

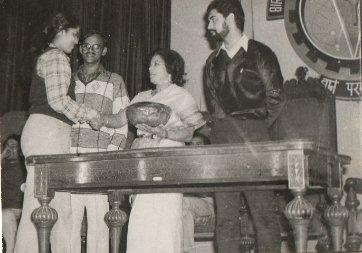
Amita Malik

| Year | Awardee | From | Profession | Category | Ref |
|---|---|---|---|---|---|
| 1991 | Sobha Brahma | Assam | Bodo writer | Art & Culture | |
| 1992 | C. N. R. Rao | Karnataka | Solid State chemist | Science & Technology | |
| 1992 | S. P. Thyagarajan | Tamil Nadu | Microbiologist | Science & Technology | |
| 1992 | Sankha Ghosh | West Bengal | Bengali poet | Art & Culture | |
| 1993 | Sarbeswar Bujarbarua | Assam | Plasma scientist | Science & Technology | |
| 1993 | Nilmani Phookan | Assam | Assamese poet | Art & Culture | |
| 1994 | Dilip Kumar Choudhury | Assam | Physicist | Science & Technology | |
| 1994 | Sisir Kumar Das | West Bengal | Bengali writer | Art & Culture | |
| 1995 | Indira Goswami | Assam | Assamese Writer | Art & Culture | |
| 1995 | T. S. R. Prasada Rao | Andhra Pradesh | Molecular catalysis | Science & Technology | |
| 1996 | Amita Malik | New Delhi | Media critic | Art & Culture | |
| 1996 | Lakshmidhar Satpathy | Bhubaneswar | Nuclear physicist | Science & Technology | |
| 1997 | Achyut Lahkar | Assam | Theatre personality | Art & Culture | |
| 1997 | Raghunath Anant Mashelkar | Goa | Former Director General, CSIR | Science & Technology | |
| 1998 | Nabakanta Barua | Assam | Assamese writer | Art & Culture | |
| 1998 | Vibha Dhawan | New Delhi | Biotechnologist | Science & Technology | |
| 1999 | Hiren Gohain | Assam | Social scientist | Art & Culture | |
| 1999 | Ashoke Sen | Kolkata | Theoretical physicist | Science & Technology | |
| 2000 | Bhabendra Nath Saikia | Assam | Assamese writer | Art & Culture | |
| 2000 | Jayant Narlikar | Maharashtra | Astrophysicist | Science & Technology | |
| 2001 | Adoor Gopalakrishnan | Kerala | Filmmaker | Art & Culture | |
| 2001 | Tej P. Singh | New Delhi | Biophysicist | Science & Technology | |
| 2002 | Samir Bhattacharya | West Bengal | Biotechnologist | Science & Technology | |
| 2002 | Maharaj Kumari Binodini Devi | Manipur | Manipuri writer | Art & Culture | |
| 2003 | Prannoy Roy | West Bengal | Psephologist | Art & Culture | |
| 2003 | Jitendra Nath Goswami | Assam | Astrophysicist | Science & Technology | |
| 2003 | Jahnu Baruah | Assam | Film Maker | Art & Culture | |
| 2004 | Dhrubajyoti Mukhopadhyay | West Bengal | Geologist | Science & Technology | |
| 2004 | Nabaneeta Dev Sen | West Bengal | Writer and academic | Art & Culture | |
| 2005 | Joyanti Chutia | Assam | Physicist | Science & Technology | |
| 2005 | Kanaksen Deka | Assam | Assamese writer | Art & Culture | |
| 2006 | Dhirendra Nath Burhagohain | Assam | Civil Engineer | Science & Technology | |
| 2006 | Hemanta Mishra | Nepal | Writer | Art & Culture | |
| 2007 | Maqsood Siddiqi | Kolkata | Chief, Cancer Foundation of India; Kolkata | Science & Technology | |
| 2007 | Aribam Syam Sharma | Manipur | Filmmaker | Art & Culture | |
| 2008 | Bhupendra Nath Goswami | Pune | Former Director; Indian Institute of Tropical Meteorology | Science & Technology | |
| 2008 | Ramakanta Rath | Orissa | Poet; Former Chairman, Sahitya Akademi. | Art & Culture | |
| 2009 | Roddam Narasimha | Karnataka | Aerospace scientist Indian Institute of Science | Science & Technology | |
| 2009 | Parveen Sultana | Assam | Classical singer | Art & Culture | |
| 2010 | Ramesh C. Deka | Assam | Otorhynolaryngologist; All India Institute of Medical Sciences | Science & Technology | |
| 2010 | Amaresh Datta | Assam | Professor; Guwahati University | Art & Culture | |
| 2011 | Shri Krishna Joshi | Uttarakhand | Physicist; IIT Roorkee | Art & Culture | |
| 2011 | Heisnam Kanhailal | Manipur | Theatre personality Founder-Director of Kalakshetra Manipur | Art & Culture | |
| 2012 | Dhiraj Bora | Gandhinagar | Professor; Institute for Plasma Research | Science & Technology | |
| 2012 | Aisharjya P. Konwar | Assam | Painter | Art & Culture | |
| 2012 | Pushpa Bhuyan | Assam | Dancer | Art & Culture | |

== See also ==
- Kamal Kumari Barooah
- The Kamal Kumari Foundation
- Siva Prasad Barooah National Award
