= Indradhanu =

Queer social club in India

- Founded: 23 January 2013
- Founded at: IIT Delhi
- Type: LGBTQIA+ Collective
- Location: IIT Delhi
- Official language: Hindi, English, Hinglish
- Website: Indradhanu

Indradhanu is the official LGBTQIA+ (Lesbian, Gay, Bisexual, Transgender, Queer, Intersex, Asexual+) collective of Indian Institute of Technology Delhi. The student-driven collective aims to create a safe space for LGBTQIA+ persons in the institute's campus. Members from Indradhanu have also been petitioners in the decriminalisation of homosexuality in India. In December 2021, it was accorded official recognition by the college administration. It now holds a nominated position in the Student Affairs Council of IIT Delhi and works with the office of Diversity and Inclusion, IIT Delhi.

== History ==
The support group started from 23 January 2013, by Kapil. Kapil used his representation in his course group to inform more students and soon developed into a collective to create a safer space for students belonging to sexual minority groups.

According to a survey conducted in IIT Delhi in 2015, around 72% of the respondents "believe homosexuality is as normal as heterosexuality".

== Involvement in decriminalisation of homosexuality in India ==
In May 2018, the collective with support of Naz Foundation filed a petition to review Section 377. The petition was filed by a team of 20 IITians, the youngest of whom was an undergraduate student at IIT Delhi. In response of the petition, the Supreme Court agreed to review after the central government declared that it would not oppose the petitions, and would leave the case "to the wisdom of the court".

On 6 September 2018, the Court overruled an earlier decision from 2013, thereby decriminalising homosexuality in India. After the verdict, the collective gained an established recognition.

== Gallery ==
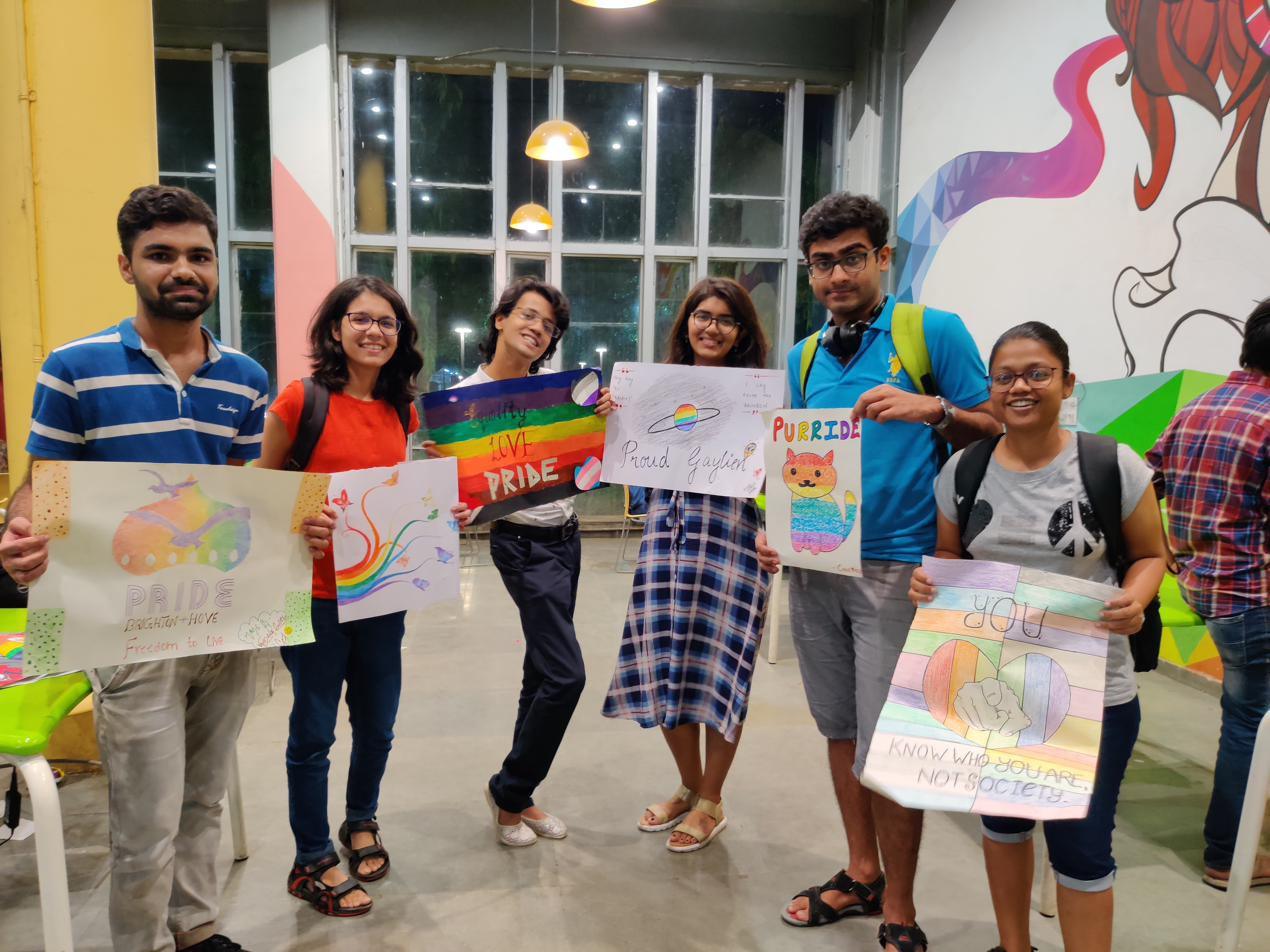
Members of Indradhanu

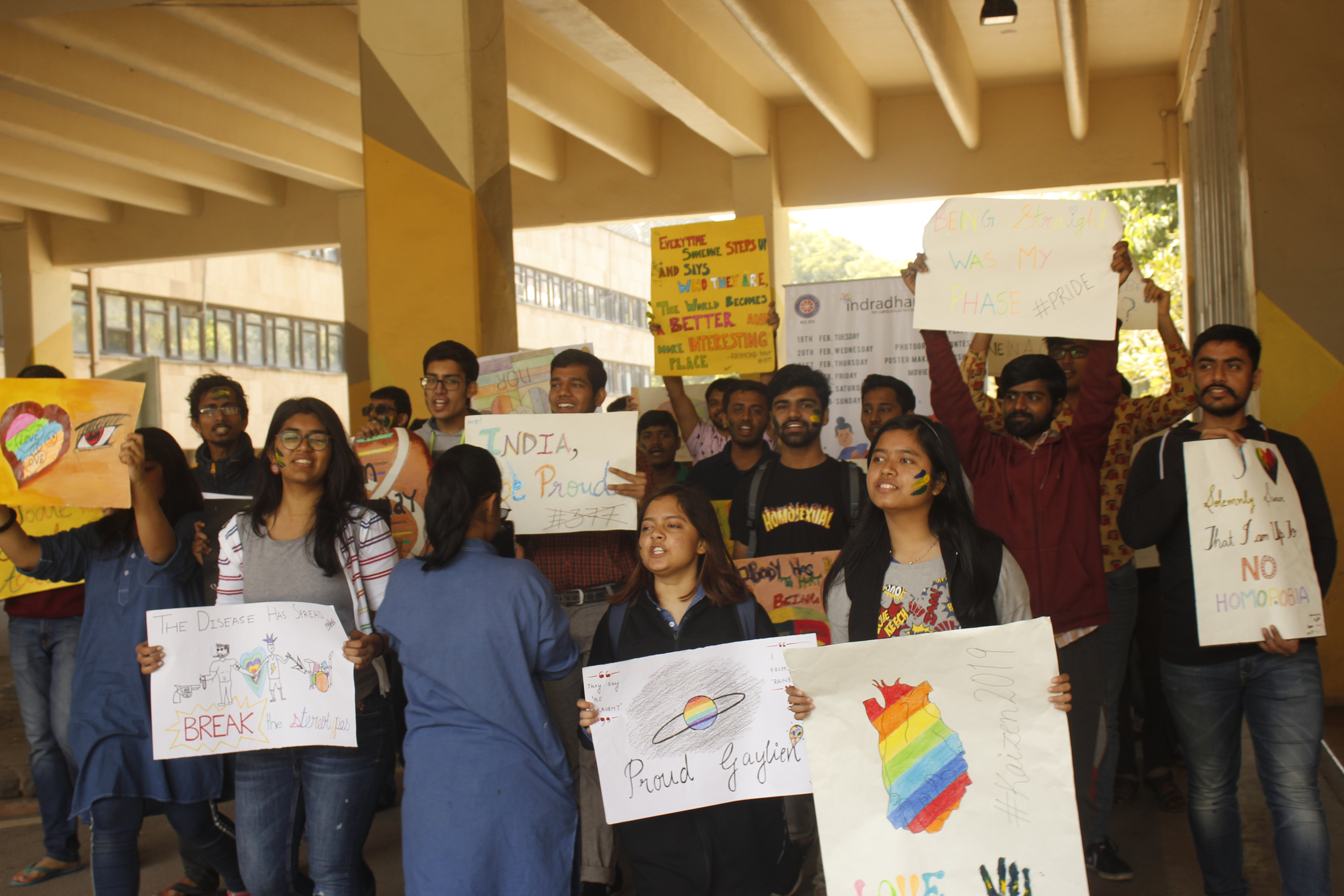
Indradhanu at the IIT-Delhi Pride March

Members with posters

== See also ==
- IIT Delhi
- LGBT rights in India
- Navtej Singh Johar v. Union of India
- Section 377 of the Indian Penal Code
