= Institute for Plasma Research =

Indian physics research institute

- Established: 1986 (40 years ago)
- Research type: Theoretical & Applied research
- Field of research: Plasma Physics
- Director: Dr. Shashank Chaturvedi
- Staff: 700 (app.) (200 Scientists & Engineers)
- Location: Gandhinagar, Gujarat, 382428, India; 23°05′52″N 72°37′34″E
- Affiliations: Department of Atomic Energy
- Website: www.ipr.res.in

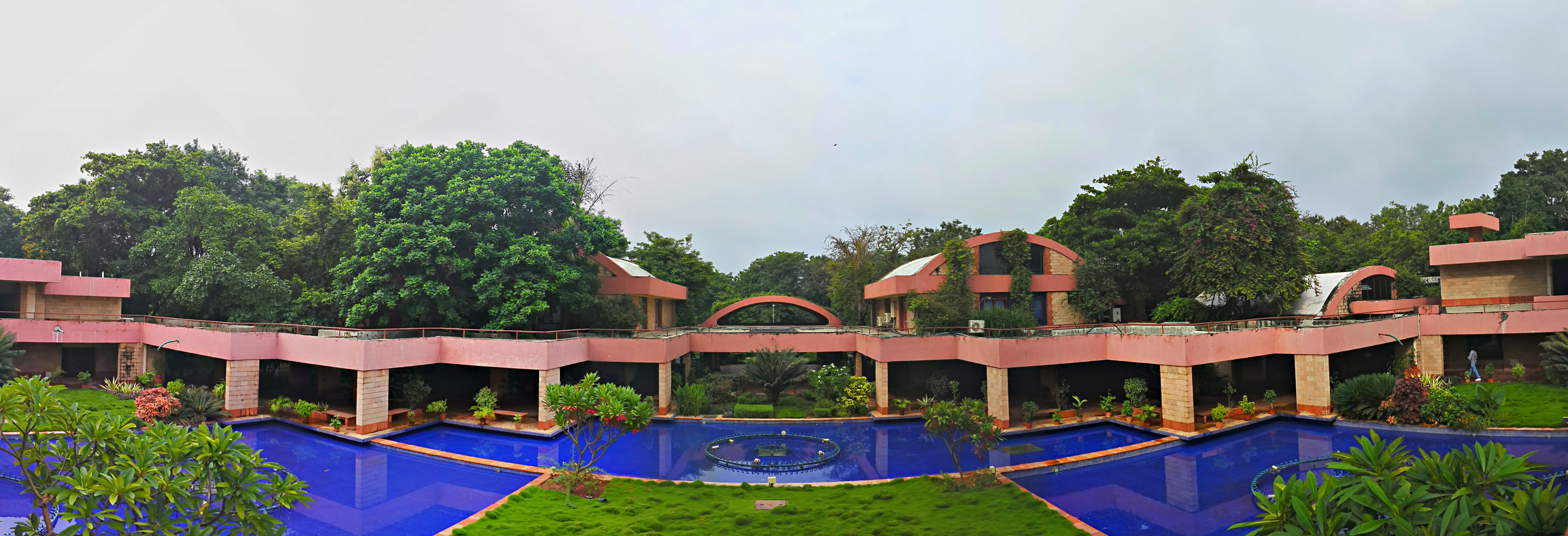
Panoramic view of Institute for Plasma Research main building.

The Institute for Plasma Research (IPR) is a public research institute in India. The institute conducts research in plasma science, including basic plasma physics, magnetically confined hot plasmas, and plasma technologies for industrial applications. It is the leading plasma physics organization of India and houses the largest tokamak of India - SST1. IPR plays a major scientific and technical role in Indian partnership in the international fusion energy initiative ITER. It is part of the IndiGO consortium for research on gravitational waves. It is an autonomous body funded by the Department of Atomic Energy.

== History ==
In 1982, the Government of India initiated the Plasma Physics Programme (PPP) for research on magnetically confined high-temperature plasmas.

In 1986, the PPP evolved into the autonomous Institute for Plasma Research under the Department of Science and Technology.

With the commissioning of ADITYA in 1989, full-fledged tokamak experiments started at IPR. A 1995 decision led to the second generation superconducting steady-state tokamak SST-1, capable of 1000-second operation. Due to this, the institute grew rapidly and came under the Department of Atomic Energy. The industrial plasma activities were reorganized under the Facilitation Centre for Industrial Plasma Technologies (FCIPT) and moved to a separate campus in Gandhinagar in 1998.

== Location ==
The institute is located on the banks of Sabarmati River in Gandhinagar district. It is approximately midway between the cities of Ahmedabad and Gandhinagar. It is 5 km from the Ahmedabad airport and 14 km from the Ahmedabad railway station.

== Remote campuses ==
- Centre of Plasma Physics - Institute for Plasma Research (CPP-IPR)
- ITER-India

=== Facilitation Centre for Industrial Plasma Technologies ===
The Facilitation Centre for Industrial Plasma Technologies (FCIPT) works in industrial plasma technologies. The centre was set up in 1997 to promote, foster, develop, demonstrate, and transfer industrially relevant plasma-based technologies to industries, thus enabling technology commercialization. The centre acts as an interface between the institute and industries. While working on industrial projects, FCIPT maintained and improved its R&D strengths and, at the same time, advanced industrial uses.

FCIPT works with national and international industries, such as Johnson & Johnson, ASP Ethicon Inc. USA, UVSYSTEC GmbH Germany, Thermax India Ltd., Mahindra & Mahindra Ltd., IPCL, Larsen & Toubro Ltd., NHPC Ltd., GE India Technology Centre Bangalore, BHEL, Triton Valves Ltd. Mysore, etc. and organizations such as BARC, DRDO, ISRO, IIT Kharagpur, National Aerospace Laboratories, and other CSIR labs. FCIPT has a material characterization laboratory with instruments such as Transmission Electron Microscope, Field Emission Scanning Electron Microscope with EDAX, Atomic Force Microscope, X-ray diffractometer, Spectroscopic Ellipsometer, UV-VIS spectroscopy, solar simulator, thickness profilometer, optical metallurgical microscope with phase analyser, full-fledged metallography laboratory, Vickers hardness tester, and an ASTM B117 corrosion testing setup. Other infrastructure include electronics and instrumentation lab, process demonstration systems, etc.

FCIPT developed technologies related to waste remediation and recovery of energy from waste, surface hardening, and heat treatment technologies such as plasma nitriding and plasma nitrocarburising, plasma-assisted metallization technologies using magnetron sputter deposition, Plasma-enhanced CVD for functional coatings on substrates, plasma melting, plasma diagnostics, and space-related plasma technologies.

Ion irradiation-induced patterning of semiconductor materials and amorphous solids is another focus. To this end, a § Broad-beam ion sources are used to generate patterns such as nanoripples or nanodots and are coated with silver for research in plasmonics.

=== Center of Plasma Physics – Institute for Plasma Research (CPP-IPR) ===
The Centre of Plasma Physics is an autonomous institute that pursues basic research in theoretical and experimental plasma physics. Its Governing Council consists of four scientists with representatives from the Institute for Plasma Research, Gandhinagar, Physical Research Laboratory, Ahmedabad, Bhabha Atomic Research Center, Bombay, and Saha Institute of Nuclear Physics, Calcutta; state government officers and local members.

==== History ====
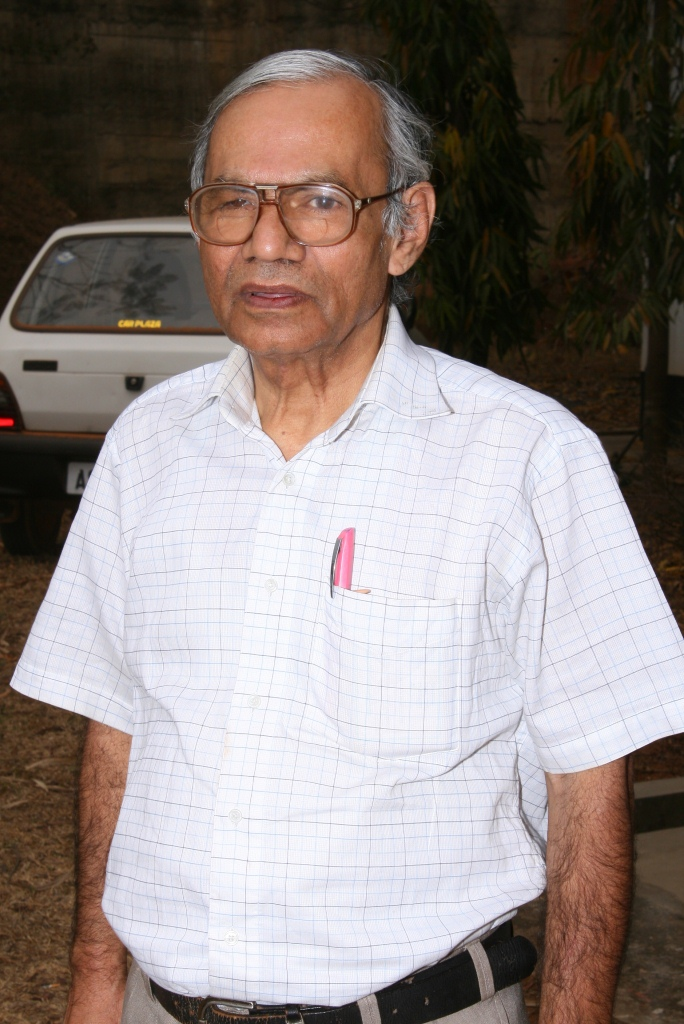
Founder of CPP-IPR Prof. S. Bujarbarua

The government of Assam established the Centre of Plasma Physics in 1991. The centre started functioning in April 1991 in a rented house located at Saptaswahid Pathi. The first chairman of the Governing Council was Professor Predhiman Krishan Kaw (died 18 June 2017) a world-renowned plasma scientist. After its three-year term, the Governing Council was reconstituted by the Education Department with Prof. A.C. Das, Dean of Physical Research Laboratory as its chairman. The founding director of the centre, Prof. Sarbeswar Bujarbarua, is a distinguished plasma scientist and a recipient of the 'Vikram Sarabhai Research Award' in 1989 and Kamal Kumari National Award in 1993.

Thereafter, the centre opened theoretical investigations in fundamental plasma processes such as nonlinear phenomena, instabilities, dusty plasma. It has set up facilities for conducting basic plasma physics experiments. Funds are available from several central government agencies (e.g. the Department of Atomic Energy and the Department of Science and Technology), the centre has taken up experimental programs in the frontline areas of plasma physics, such as dense plasma focus and dusty plasma. The centre has published more than 50 original research papers. The scientists work in close collaboration with national and international institutes like the Institute for Plasma Research, Gandhinagar; Physical Research Laboratory, Ahmedabad; Bhabha Atomic Research Centre, Bombay; Regional Research Laboratory, Bhubaneswar; Saha Institute of Nuclear Physics, Calcutta, Kyushu University, Japan; University of Bayreuth, Germany; Culham Laboratory, UK; and Flinders University, Australia. The centre runs a PhD programme with students registering with Guwahati University. Another component of the academic activity of the centre consists of holding lecturers and colloquia on plasma physics and other branches of physical sciences.

The Centre of Plasma Physics, Institute for Plasma Research, Sonapur, Kamrup, Assam, became a new campus of IPR as the Centre of Plasma Physics, Sonapur, was formally merged with IPR effective 29 May 2009. CPP-IPR is headed by Centre Director Dr K. S. Goswami and is managed by a Managing Board headed by the director of IPR. It has twelve faculty members, fourteen other staff and research scholars and project scientists. The research is oriented towards essential plasma physics and programs that complement the significant programmes at IPR.

==== Campus ====
The institute's campus is at Nazirakhat, Sonapur, about 32 km from Guwahati, the headquarters of the Kamrup(M) district of Assam. Nazirakhat is a rural area surrounded by peace-loving people of diverse caste, religion, and language, yet it presents the unique feature of unity in diversity. Nazirakhat is linked by a PWD road from the National Highway No. 37. It is about 800 metres from NH-37. Nazirakhat is connected by road with the rest of the state and the country. The institute is surrounded by greenery near the Air-India flying base at Sonapur.

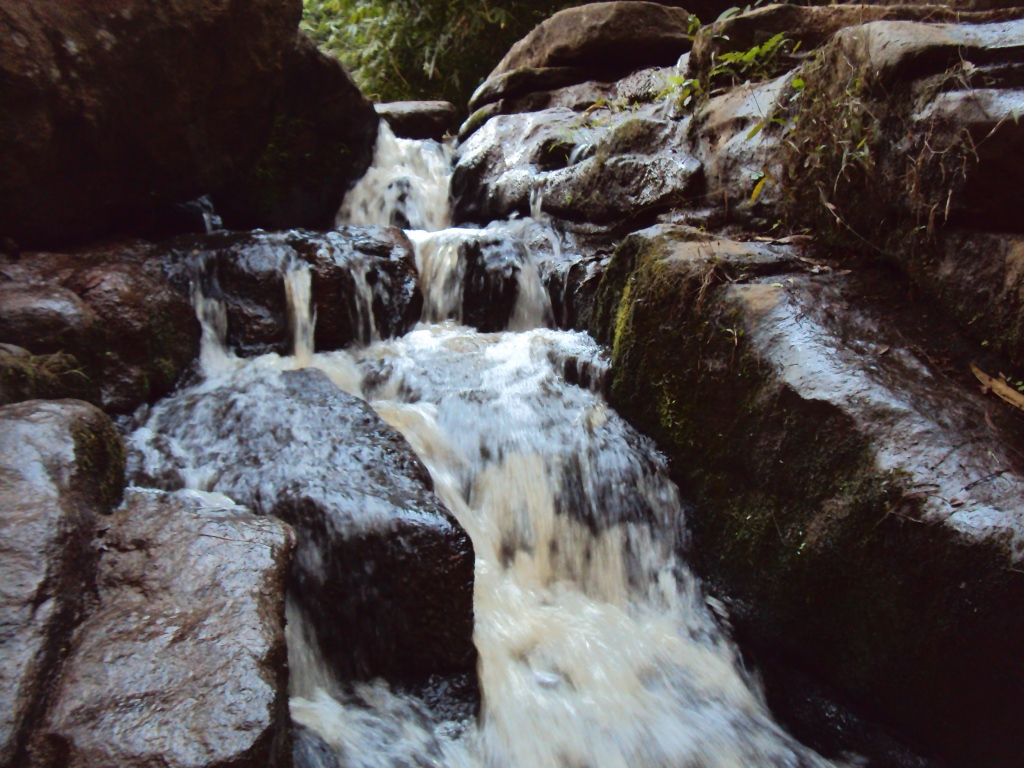
A waterfall near the campus

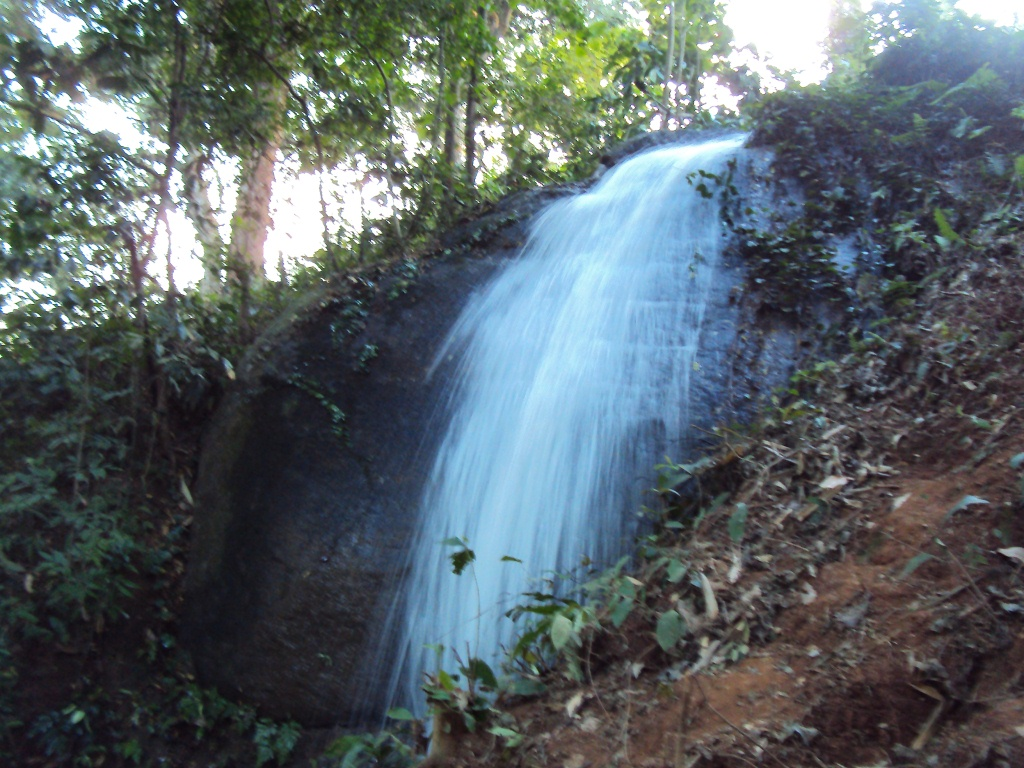
Another view of the water fall near campus

==== Publication ====
Research papers have been published in journals like Phys after the institute's establishment. Scr., Phys. Lett. A, Phys. Rev. Lett. and so on

==== Collaboration ====
The Centre collaborates with the following institutes and universities:

The Bhabha Atomic Research Centre, Bombay; Raja Ramanna Centre for Advanced Technology, Indore; Institute for Plasma Research, Gandinagar; IPP, Juelich, Germany; IPP, Garching, Germany; Kyushu University, Fukuoka, Japan; Physical Research Laboratory, Ahmedabad; National Institute for Interdisciplinary Science and Technology, Bhubaneswar; Ruhr University Bochum, Bochum, Germany; Saha Institute of Nuclear Physics, Calcutta; St. Andrews University, UK; Tokyo Metropolitan Institute of Technology, Tokyo; University of Bayreuth, Germany; and University of Kyoto, Japan.

==== Recognition ====
- S. Sen, Associate Professor, was awarded EPSRC Professorship Award (1998), UK; JSPS Professorship Award (1999), Japan; Junior Membership Award (1999), Isaac Newton Institute for Mathematical Sciences, Cambridge, UK; and Associateship Award (1999–2005), ICTP, Trieste, Italy.
- S.R. Mohanty, presently assistant professor, was awarded PhD degree by the University of Delhi for his thesis entitled "X-ray studies on dense plasma focus and plasma processing".
- M. Kakati, Research Scientist, was awarded a Senior Research Fellowship of the Council of Scientific & Industrial Research (1999–2001).
- K. R. Rajkhowa, was awarded the Plasma Science Society of India Fellowship in 1999.
- B.J. Saikia, Research Scientist, was awarded Japan Society for the Promotion of Science post-doctoral fellowship for two years in 1999.
- B. Kakati, Research Scholar, was awarded the BUTI Young Scientist Award in 2011.

=== ITER-India ===
ITER will be built mostly through in-kind contributions from the participant countries in the form of components manufactured delivered/installed at ITER.

ITER-India is the Indian Domestic Agency (DA), formed with the responsibility to provide ITER the Indian contribution.

== See also ==
- Aditya (tokamak)
- Indira Gandhi Centre for Atomic Research (IGCAR)
- Department of Atomic Energy
- List of plasma physics software
