= ADITYA (tokamak) =

Indian tokamak

ADITYA is a medium size tokamak installed at the Institute for Plasma Research in India. Its construction began in 1982, and it was commissioned in 1989. It was the first tokamak in India.

It has a major radius of 0.75 metres and a minor radius of 0.25 metres. The maximum field strength is 1.2 tesla produced by 20 toroidal field coils spaced symmetrically in the toroidal direction. It is operated by two power supplies, a capacitor bank and the APPS (ADITYA pulse power supply).

The typical plasma parameters during capacitor bank discharges are: I_{p} ~30 kA, shot duration ~25 ms, central electron temperature ~100 eV and core plasma density ~10^{19} m^{−3} and the typical parameters of APPS operation is ~100 kA plasma current, ~ 100 ms duration, central electron temp. ~300 eV and ~3×10^{19} m^{−3} core plasma density.

Various diagnostics used in ADITYA include electric and magnetic probes, microwave interferometry, Thomson scattering and charge exchange spectroscopy.

ADITYA has been upgraded to ADITYA-U, with first plasma obtained in 2016.
