= Rengaswamy Ramesh =

Indian climatologist (1956–2018)

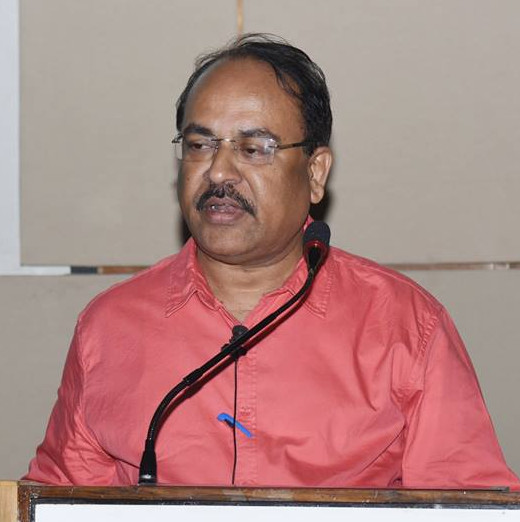
- Born: 2 June 1956; Tamil Nadu, India
- Died: 2 April 2018
- Education: University of Madras; Physical Research Laboratory; Gujarat University; Scripps Institution of Oceanography
- Known for: Paleo-climatic and paleo-oceanographic studies
- Awards: 1973 All India Bengali Literary Conference Medal; Jagirdar of Arni Gold Medal; Professor P. E. Subrahmanya Ayyar Gold Medal; 1987 INSA Young Scientist Medal; 1998 S. S. Bhatnagar Prize; 2006 TWAS Prize; ISRO Lifetime Achievement Award
- Scientific career
- Fields: Climatology; Oceanography
- Workplaces: National Institute of Science Education and Research Physical Research Laboratory
- Doctoral advisor: Kunchithapadam Gopalan; Devendra Lal

Rengaswamy Ramesh (1956–2018) was an Indian climatologist, oceanographer, a former Prof. Satish Dhawan Professor at the Physical Research Laboratory and a senior professor at the National Institute of Science Education and Research, Bhubaneswar. He was known for paleo-climatic and paleo-oceanographic studies and was an elected fellow of all the three major Indian science academies viz. Indian National Science Academy, Indian Academy of Sciences, and the National Academy of Sciences, India as well as of The World Academy of Sciences. The Council of Scientific and Industrial Research, the apex agency of the Government of India for scientific research, awarded him the Shanti Swarup Bhatnagar Prize for Science and Technology, one of the highest Indian science awards for his contributions to Earth, Atmosphere, Ocean and Planetary Sciences in 1998. (Note: Long link - please select award year to see details)

== Biography ==
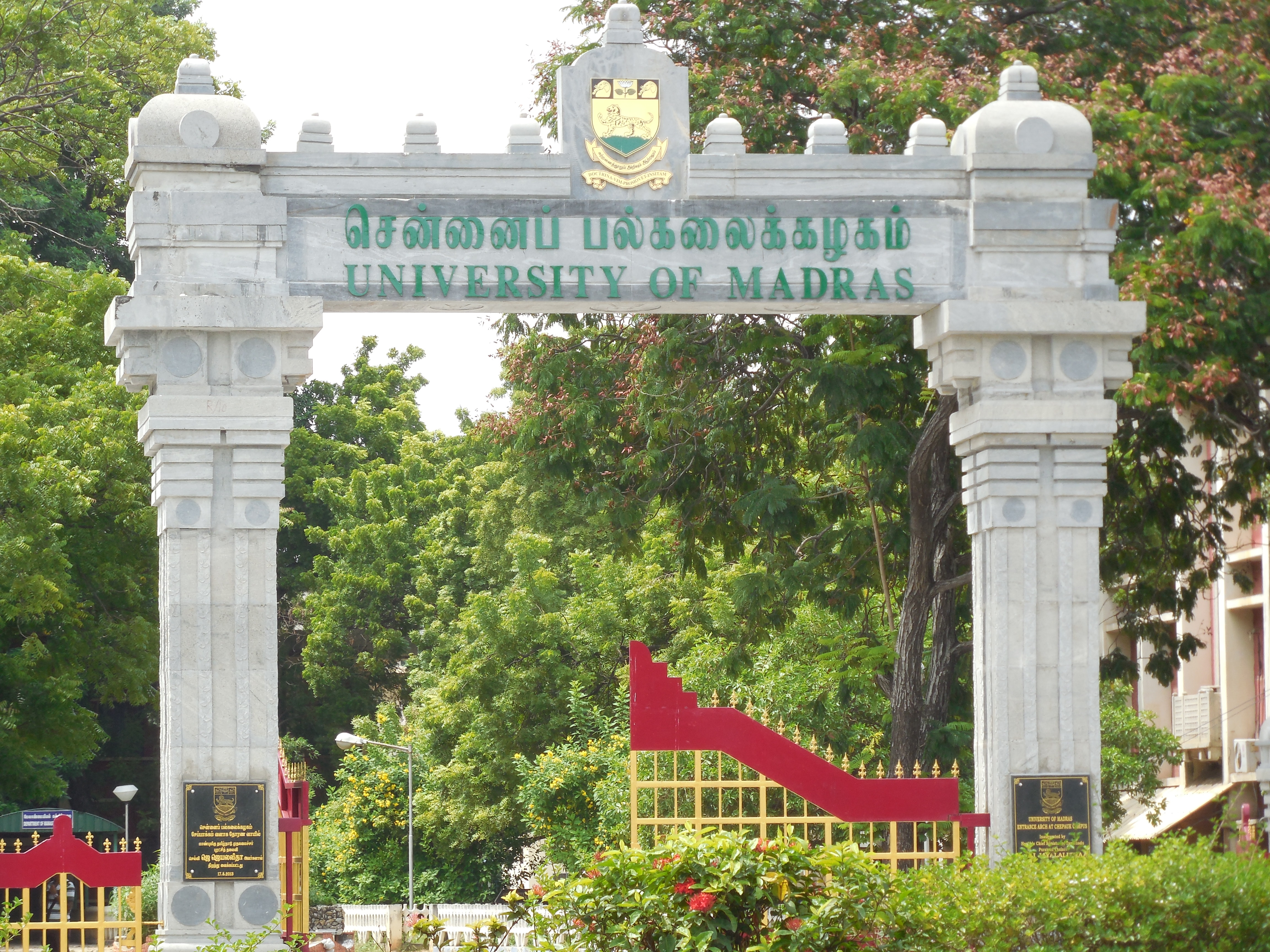
University of Madras

R. Ramesh, born on 2 June 1956 in the south Indian state of Tamil Nadu, did his graduate studies in physics (1976) at the University of Madras and completed his master's degree at the same university in 1978. Enrolling for his doctoral studies under the supervision of Kunchithapadam Gopalan of Physical Research Laboratory (PRL), he secured a PhD from Gujarat University in 1984 and did his post doctoral studies at his mentor's laboratory during 1985–86. He joined the Planetary and Geosciences Division of PRL as a research associate in 1987 and has served the institution in such various capacities as a Scientist-Grade D (1987–94), Reader (1994–98), Associate Professor (1999–2001), Professor (2002–07) and Senior Professor (since 2008) and holds the position of a Foundation for GLocal Science Initiatives (FGSI) Outstanding Scientist. In between, he had a short stint at Scripps Institution of Oceanography during 1992–93 as a visiting research associate, working under the guidance of Devendra Lal. He died on 2 April 2018, at the age of 61.

== Legacy ==
Ramesh is known to have contributed to the reconstruction studies of paleo-climatic and paleo-oceanographic conditions of the Indian Ocean. He is credited, along with S. K. Bhattacharya and Kunchithapadam Gopalan, with the establishment of a Stable Isotope laboratory for the first time in India. At the laboratory, he applied stable isotope methodology to study tree-rings, corals, peat deposits, speleothems, lake sediments and marine sediments and his studies assisted in widening the knowledge of the monsoons for the past 35 kiloannum. He developed equations for the calculation of past temperatures and rainfall using stable isotope ratios and prepared high resolution documentation of the monsoon changes during the Holocene epoch. His studies have been detailed in several peer-reviewed articles; (Note: Please see Selected bibliography section) ResearchGate and Google Scholar, two online repositories of scientific articles, have listed 208 and 267 of them respectively. He was one of the lead authors of the book, Climate Change 2013: The Physical Science Basis, a 1552-page compilation of reports of the Working Group I of the Intergovernmental Panel on Climate Change, published by Cambridge University Press in 2014. He has mentored 15 scholars in their doctoral studies who were also trained by him in stable isotope methodology. He is the project director of the National Program on Palaeoclimate studies of the ISRO-Geosphere Biosphere Programme (GBP) and sits in the Research Council of the National Geophysical Research Institute as an external member.

== Awards and honors ==
Ramesh, a National Merit Certificate holder of Ministry of Education and Social Welfare in 1972, received the All India Bengali Literary Conference Medal in 1973. He was selected for the Jawaharlal Nehru Memorial Fund Fellowship in 1976 for his project on The Life and Work of Professor Sir C. V. Raman and the Young Scientist Medal of the Indian National Science Academy reached him in 1987. The Council of Scientific and Industrial Research awarded him the Shanti Swarup Bhatnagar Prize, one of the highest Indian science awards in 1998. The Indian Academy of Sciences elected him as its fellow in 1996 and the other two major Indian science academies, the Indian National Science Academy and the National Academy of Sciences, India followed suit in 2001 and 2002 respectively. He received the TWAS Prize in 2006; TWAS honored him again in 2007 with an elected fellowship. The Indian Space Research Organization awarded him the Lifetime Achievement Award in 2016.

The Intergovernmental Panel on Climate Change listed Ramesh as one of the scientists who contributed to reports of the IPCC, which was awarded the 2007 Nobel Peace Prize. He is also a recipient of the Jagirdar of Arni Gold Medal and the Professor P. E. Subrahmanya Ayyar Gold Medal. The list of award orations and plenary speeches delivered by Ramesh includes the 2011 K. R. Ramanathan lecture of the Indian Geophysical Union and the address on Oceanic nitrogen cycling: new results based on isotopic tracers of 2013 held at the K.R. Ramanathan Auditorium of the Physical Research Laboratory.

== Selected bibliography ==
- Sheela Kusumgar, D. P. Agrawal, R. D. Deshpande, Rengaswamy Ramesh, Chhemendra Sharma, M. G. Yadava (January 1995). "A Comparative Study of Monsoonal and Non-Monsoonal Himalayan Lakes, India". Radiocarbon. 37 (2): 191–195. Bibcode:1995Radcb..37..191K. doi:10.1017/S0033822200030630.
- Tiwari, M., Ramesh, R., Bhushan, R., Somayajulu, B. L. K., Jull, A. J. T., Burr, G. S. (2006). "Paleoproductivity variations in the equatorial Arabian Sea: Implications for East African and Indian summer rainfalls and the el NIÑO frequency". Radiocarbon. 48 (1): 17–29. Bibcode:2006Radcb..48...17T. doi:10.1017/S0033822200035360.
- Murugan, M.; Mukund, V.; Ramesh, R.; Hiremath, M. B.; Josephrajkumar, A.; Shetty, P. K. (2008). "Centennial rainfall variation in semi arid and tropical humid environments in the cardamom hill slopes, Southern Western Ghats, India". Journal of Environmental Sciences. 6 (1): 31–39.
- Laskar, A. H.; Sharma, N.; Ramesh, R.; Jani, R. A.; Yadava, M. G. (2010). "Paleoclimate and paleovegetation of Lower Narmada Basin, Gujarat, Western India, inferred from stable carbon and oxygen isotopes". Quaternary International. 227 (2): 183–189. Bibcode:2010QuInt.227..183L. doi:10.1016/j.quaint.2010.05.020.
- Tiwari, Manish; Singh, Ashutosh K.; Ramesh, Rengaswamy (2011). "High-resolution monsoon records since last glacial maximum: a comparison of marine and terrestrial paleoarchives from South Asia". Journal of Geological Research. 2011: 1–12. doi:10.1155/2011/765248.
- Lekshmy, P.R; Midhun, M; Ramesh Rengaswamy (2014). "18O depletion in monsoon rain relates to large scale organized convection rather than the amount of rainfall". Scientific Reports. doi:10.1038/srep05661

== See also ==
- Mass spectrometry
- Mathematical modeling
