= Sethunathasarma Krishnaswami =

Indian geochemist (1945–2015)

- Born: 21 May 1945; Thiruvananthapuram, Kerala, India
- Died: 20 July 2015 (aged 70)
- Education: University of Kerala; Tata Institute of Fundamental Research; Bombay University; Scripps Institution of Oceanography; Yale University
- Known for: Studies on low temperature geochemistry
- Awards: 1975 INSA Young Scientist Medal; 1981 Krishnan Medal; 1984 Shanti Swarup Bhatnagar Prize
- Scientific career
- Fields: Geochemistry
- Workplaces: BARC Atomic Energy Training School; Physical Research Laboratory
- Doctoral advisor: Devendra Lal; Harmon Craig; K. K. Turekian

Sethunathasarma Krishnaswami (21 May 1945 – 20 July 2015), popularly known as Swami, was an Indian geochemist and an honorary scientist at the geosciences division of the Physical Research Laboratory. He was known for his studies on low temperature geochemistry and was an elected fellow of the Indian Academy of Sciences, Indian National Science Academy, The World Academy of Sciences, National Academy of Sciences, India, American Geophysical Union, Geochemical Society and European Association of Geochemistry (2003). The Council of Scientific and Industrial Research, the apex agency of the Government of India for scientific research, awarded him the Shanti Swarup Bhatnagar Prize for Science and Technology, one of the highest Indian science awards for his contributions to Earth, atmosphere, ocean and planetary Sciences in 1984.

== Biography ==
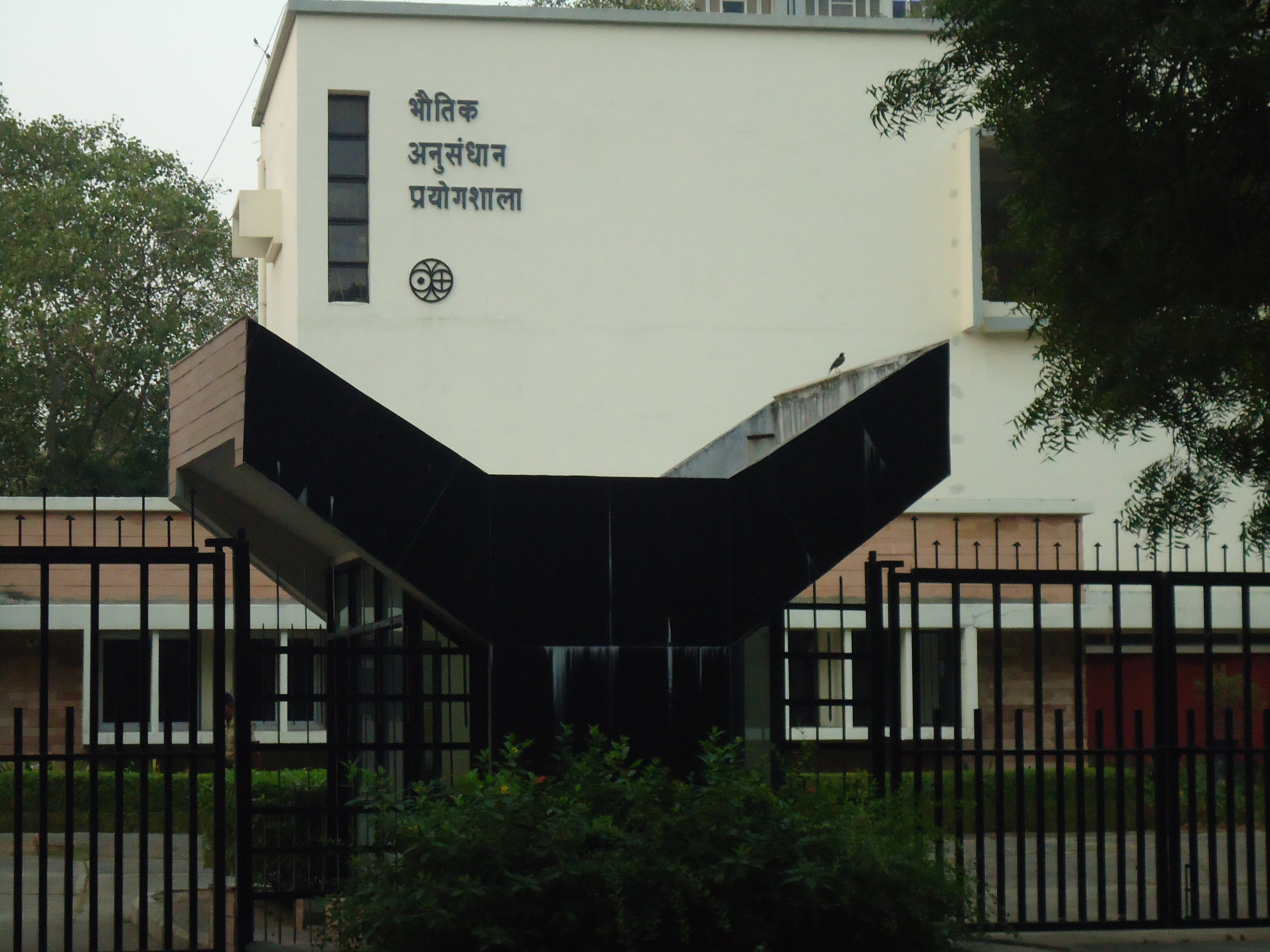
Physical Research Laboratory

Krishnaswami, born on 21 May 1945 in Thiruvananthapuram, in the south Indian state of Kerala, did his graduate studies in science at the University College, Thiruvananthapuram of the University of Kerala and on completion of the degree in 1963, he joined Bhabha Atomic Research Centre Training School for a short term training. Subsequently, he joined the geophysics group of Tata Institute of Fundamental Research as a research associate in 1964 where he stayed till 1972. Simultaneously, he enrolled in Bombay University and secured a PhD in 1974, working under the guidance of Devendra Lal. His post-doctoral researches were at Scripps Institution of Oceanography with Harmon Craig and at the laboratory of K. K. Turekian of Yale University. By this time, he had already moved to Physical Research Laboratory (PRL), Ahmedabad in 1973 and on returning to India, he spent the rest of his career there, superannuating from service in 2005. He held various positions during his tenure at PRL such as that of a dean from 1987 to 1993 and acting director during 2004–05 and continued his association with the laboratory post-retirement as an Indian National Science Academy scientist and honorary professor. He also served as a visiting scientist at Scripps Institute of Oceanography (1971–72) and as a visiting faculty at the Department of Geology and Geophysics of Yale University for three stints during 1976–77, 1979-1982 and 1986–87.

Krishnaswami died on 20 July 2015 at the age of 70, survived by his wife, son and daughter.

== Legacy ==
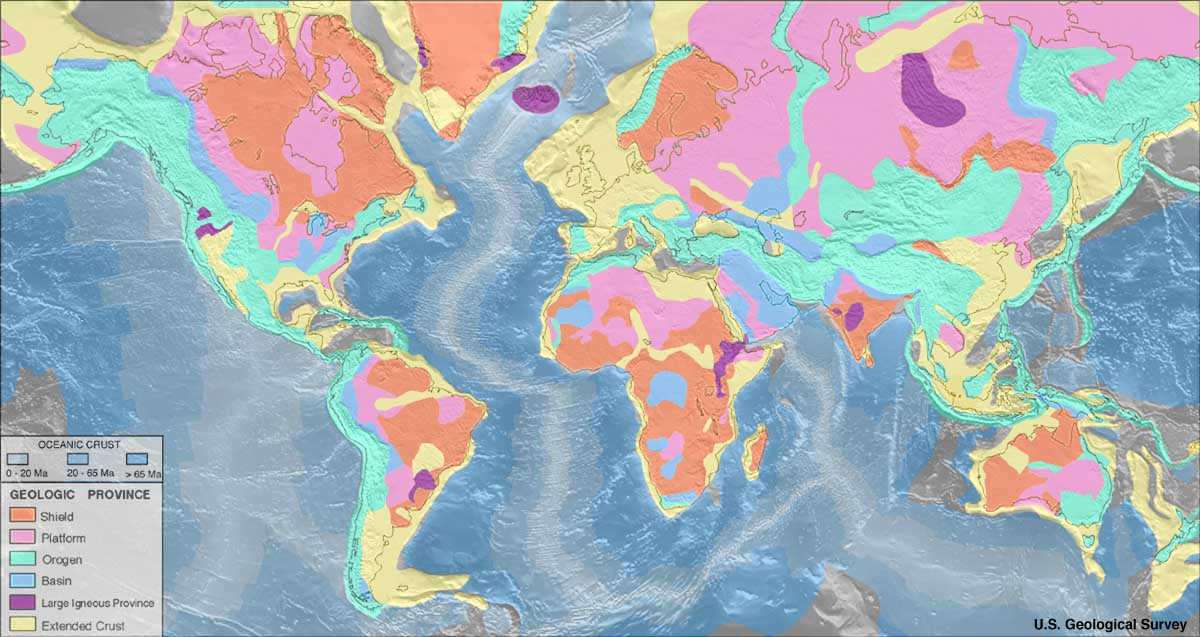
The Deccan Traps shown as dark purple spot on the geologic map of India

During his research collaborative study at Scripps Institution of Oceanography, Krishnaswami assisted Harmon Craig in his discovery of 210Pb-226Ra radioactive disequilibrium in the deep sea and his association with K. K. Turekian at Yale University helped develop U-Th series nuclide applications in aquatic systems which has been detailed in a book, U-Th Series Nuclides in Aquatic Systems, co-edited by him and published by Elsevier Science in 2008. His researches are known to have established the accretion rate and growth history of ocean-floor ferromanganese nodules which he estimated by radionuclide method and the work assisted in the determination of the history of sedimentation in Indian lakes and coastal regions. He applied these methods in estimating the weathering and erosion in the Himalaya and Deccan Traps and for assessing their influence on global change. He was also involved in geochemical studies on the rivers of Ganges and Brahmaputra for assessing the evolution of strontium isotopes and uranium concentration in the ocean since the Cenozoic era. His studies have been detailed in over 100 peer reviewed articles; (Note: Please see Selected bibliography section) the online article repository of the Indian Academy of Sciences has listed several of them. He served as the vice president of International Association for the Physical Sciences of the Oceans (2003–07) and Scientific Committee on Oceanic Research of the International Council for Science (1994–96), as the treasurer of the International Geosphere-Biosphere Programme, and as a member of the council of the Indian National Science Academy (2002–04). He was also associated with Geochimica et Cosmochimica Acta and Journal of Earth System Science as a member of their editorial boards and mentored 6 doctoral scholars in their studies.

== Awards and honors ==
Krishnaswami received the Young Scientist Medal of the Indian National Science Academy in 1975 and Krishnan Medal of the Indian Geophysical Union in 1981. The Council of Scientific and Industrial Research awarded him the Shanti Swarup Bhatnagar Prize for Science and Technology, one of the highest Indian science awards, in 1984. He was an elected fellow of all the three major Indian science academies; the Indian Academy of Sciences elected him as a fellow in 1986, followed by Indian National Science Academy in 1989 and the National Academy of Sciences, India in 1992. He became a fellow of The World Academy of Sciences with his election in 2000. He was also a fellow of the American Geophysical Union, Geochemical Society and European Association of Geochemistry (2003).

== Selected bibliography ==
=== Books ===
- S. Krishnaswami, J. Kirk Cochran, ed. (May 2008). U-Th Series Nuclides in Aquatic Systems. Elsevier Science. p. 440. ISBN 9780080450124.

=== Articles ===
- Dalai, Tarun K.; Krishnaswami, S.; Sarin, M. M. (2002). "Barium in the Yamuna River System in the Himalaya: sources, fluxes, and its behavior during weathering and transport". Geochemistry, Geophysics, Geosystems. 1076–1098 (12): 1076–1098. Bibcode:2002GGG.....3.1076D. doi:10.1029/2002GC000381.
- Rengarajan, R.; Sarin, M. M.; Krishnaswami, S. (2003). "Uranium in the Arabian Sea: role of denitrification in controlling its distribution". Oceanologica Acta. 26 (5–6): 687–693. Bibcode:2003AcOc...26..687R. doi:10.1016/j.oceact.2003.05.001.
- Das, Anirban; Krishnaswami, S.; Bhattacharya, S. K. (2005). "Carbon isotope ratio of dissolved inorganic carbon (DIC) in rivers draining the Deccan Traps, India: sources of DIC and their magnitudes". Earth and Planetary Science Letters. 236 (1–2): 419–429. Bibcode:2005E&PSL.236..419D. doi:10.1016/j.epsl.2005.05.009.
- Yadav, D. N.; Sarin, M. M.; Krishnaswami, S. (2007). "a". Journal of the Geological Society of India. 69 (1): 139–152. ISSN 0016-7622.
- Singh, Sunil K.; Rai, Santosh K.; Krishnaswami, S. (2008). "Sr and Nd isotopes in river sediments from the Ganga Basin: sediment provenance and spatial variability in physical erosion". Journal of Geophysical Research. 113 (F3): F03006. Bibcode:2008JGRF..113.3006S. doi:10.1029/2007JF000909.
- Tripathy, Gyana R.; Singh, Sunil K.; Krishnaswami, S. (2011). "Sr and Nd isotopes as tracers of chemical and physical erosion". In: Handbook of Environmental Isotope Geochemistry (Ed: M. Baskaran), Advances in Isotope Geochemistry, 521-552, DOI: 10.1007/978-3-642-10637-8_26.

== See also ==
- Devendra Lal
- Harmon Craig
