= Jyotiranjan Srichandan Ray =

Indian geochemist, geochronologist and a professor

- Born: 16 July 1970 (age 56); Odisha, India
- Education: Physical Research Laboratory
- Known for: Studies on geochronology of Indian subcontinent
- Awards: 1998 PRL Best PhD Thesis Award; 2000 INSA Young Scientist Medal; 2009 Krishnan Medal; 2009 MoM National Geoscience Award; 2013 PRL Research Award; 2015 Shanti Swarup Bhatnagar Prize
- Scientific career
- Fields: Geochemistry; Geochronology
- Workplaces: Physical Research Laboratory, National Centre for Earth Science Studies
- Doctoral advisor: Prof. R. Ramesh

Jyotiranjan Srichandan Ray (born 16 July 1970) is an Indian geochemist, geochronologist and a Professor at the Physical Research Laboratory. He is known for his studies on the geochronology of the Indian subcontinent and his studies have been documented in several peer-reviewed articles; (Note: Please see Selected bibliography section) ResearchGate and Google Scholar, online repositories of scientific articles, have listed 53 and 59 of them respectively. He has authored a book, Vindhyan Geology: Status and Perspectives, published in 2006 by the Indian Academy of Sciences and has also contributed chapters to books published by others. He served as a Director of National Centre for Earth Science Studies (NCESS), situated in Thiruvananthapuram, Kerala (India) from September 2020 to September 2023.

Ray, born on 16 July 1970, in the Indian state of Odisha, is a recipient of several honors including Best PhD Thesis Award of the Physical Research Laboratory, Young Associateship of the Indian Academy of Sciences, Young Scientist Medal of the Indian National Science Academy, Krishnan Medal of the Indian Geophysical Union, National Geoscience Award of the Ministry of Mines and Physical Research Laboratory Research Award. The Council of Scientific and Industrial Research, the apex agency of the Government of India for scientific research, awarded him the Shanti Swarup Bhatnagar Prize for Science and Technology, one of the highest Indian science awards for his contributions to the Earth, Atmosphere, Ocean and Planetary Sciences in 2015. (Note: Long link - please select award year to see details)

== Selected bibliography ==
=== Books and chapters ===
- Jyotiranjan S. Ray (2006). Vindhyan Geology: Status and Perspectives. Indian Acad. of Sciences.
- Vishwas S. Kale; Jyotiranjan S. Ray (23 May 2014). Landscapes and Landforms of India. Springer. pp. 12–. ISBN 978-94-017-8029-2.
- Jyotiranjan S. Ray; M. Radhakrishna (28 February 2020). The Andaman Islands and Adjoining Offshore: Geology, Tectonics and Palaeoclimate. Springer, Cham. doi:10.1007/978-3-030-39843-9

=== Articles ===
- Jyotiranjan S. Ray; Mark W. Martin; Ján Veizer; Samuel A. Bowring (February 2002). "U-Pb zircon dating and Sr isotope systematics of the Vindhyan Supergroup, India". GeoScienceWorld. 030 (2): 131. Bibcode:2002Geo....30..131R. doi:10.1130/0091-7613(2002)030<0131:UPZDAS>2.0.CO;2.
- Jyotiranjan S. Ray; Kanchan Pande; S. K. Pattanayak (2003). "Evolution of the Amba Dongar Carbonatite Complex: Constraints from 40Ar-39Ar Chronologies of the Inner Basalt and an Alkaline Plug". International Geology Review. 45 (9): 857–862. Bibcode:2003IGRv...45..857R. doi:10.2747/0020-6814.45.9.857. S2CID 129933424.
- Jyotiranjan S. Ray; P. N. Shukla (December 2004). "Trace element geochemistry of Amba Dongar carbonatite complex, India: Evidence for fractional crystallization and silicate-carbonate melt immiscibility". Journal of Earth System Science. 113 (4): 519–531. Bibcode:2004InEPS.113..519R. doi:10.1007/BF02704020. S2CID 129805424.
- Jyotiranjan S. Ray; S. K. Pattanayak; Kanchan Pande (2005). "Rapid emplacement of the Kerguelen plume–related Sylhet Traps, eastern India: Evidence from 40Ar-39Ar geochronology". Geophysical Research Letters. 32 (L10303). doi:10.1029/2005GL022586.
- Jyotiranjan S. Ray (2009). "Carbon isotopic variations in fluid-deposited graphite: evidence for multicomponent Rayleigh isotopic fractionation". International Geology Review. 51 (1): 45–57. Bibcode:2009IGRv...51...45R. doi:10.1080/00206810802625057. S2CID 97854500.
