= Kunchithapadam Gopalan =

Indian geochronologist

- Born: 12 August 1938; Tamil Nadu, British Raj (now India)
- Died: 10 October 2026 (aged 88); Chennai, Tamil Nadu, India
- Education: Madras University; Andhra University; Indian Institute of Science
- Known for: Studies on the chronologies of rock suites of the Indian subcontinent
- Awards: 1982 Shanti Swarup Bhatnagar Prize; 1982 Krishnan Medal; 1991 Eminent Mass Spectrometrist Award
- Scientific career
- Fields: Geochronology
- Workplaces: Tata Institute of Fundamental Research; Physical Research Laboratory; National Geophysical Research Institute
- Doctoral advisor: V. S. Venkatasubramanian; George Wetherill

Kunchithapadam Gopalan (12 August 1938 – 10 October 2026) was an Indian geochronologist and a former emeritus scientist at National Geophysical Research Institute. He was known for his studies on the chronologies of critical rock suites of the Indian subcontinent and was an elected fellow of the Indian Academy of Sciences, Indian National Science Academy, Indian Geophysical Union and the National Academy of Sciences, India. The Council of Scientific and Industrial Research, the apex agency of the Government of India for scientific research, awarded him the Shanti Swarup Bhatnagar Prize for Science and Technology, one of the highest Indian science awards for his contributions to earth, atmosphere, ocean and planetary sciences in 1982.

== Biography ==
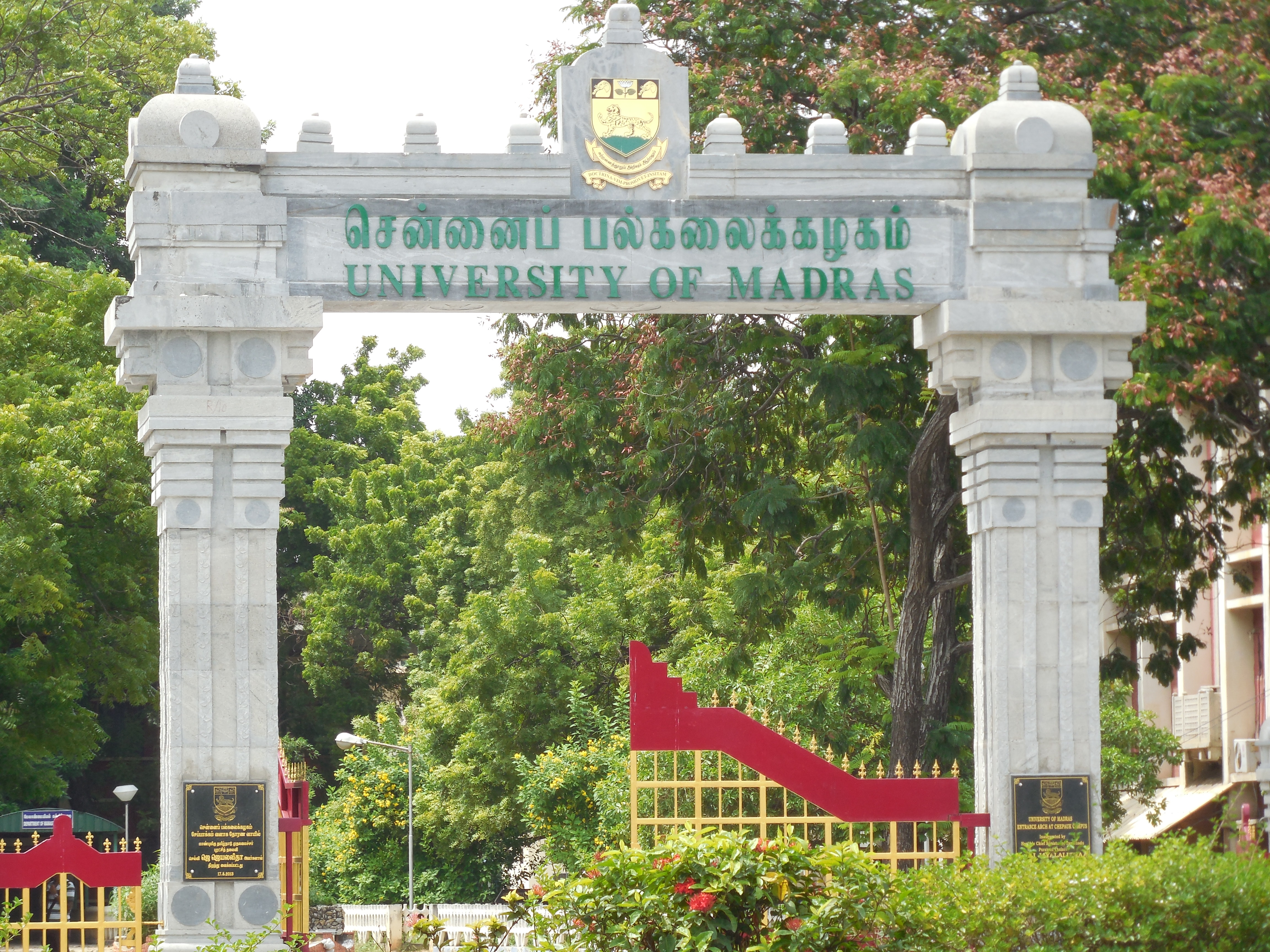
University of Madras entrance

K. Gopalan, born on 12 August 1938 in the south Indian state of Tamil Nadu, graduated in physics (Bsc hons) from the University of Madras in 1959 and completed his master's degree in nuclear physics from Andhra University in 1960, standing first in the university. Enrolling at the Indian Institute of Science for his doctoral studies, he secured a PhD in 1966, working under the guidance of V. S. Venkatasubramanian and moved to the University of California, Los Angeles where he did his postdoctoral studies at the laboratory of George Wetherill on meteorites and lunar samples. On his return to India, he joined Tata Institute of Fundamental Research in 1970 but moved to Physical Research Laboratory in 1973. His next move was to the National Geophysical Research Institute (NGRI) where he served for the rest of his career and after his superannuation in 1998, he continued his association with the institute as its emeritus scientist till 2015 .

== Legacy ==
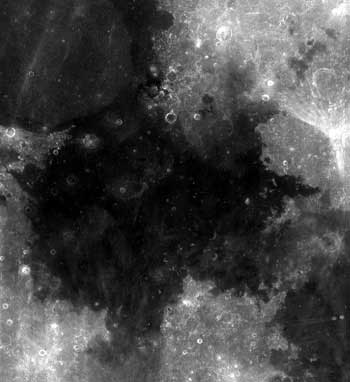
The Sea of Tranquility of the Moon

After his early studies on meteorites and lunar samples, Gopalan's focus shifted during his PRL days to geochronology. His work has been primarily in the field of geochronology and he is known to have conducted extensive studies on the chronologies of several critical rock suites of the Indian subcontinent for which he developed custom-built equipment. He worked on the precambrian Rajasthan and Madhya Pradesh using Rb-Sr dating techniques with mass spectrometer as well as the volcanic rocks of the Deccan Plateau and his researches have assisted in a wider understanding of the ages of solid bodies in the Solar System and basaltic volcanism in Mare Tranquillitatis. He is credited with the setting up of a mass spectrometer, a facility for Argon–argon dating of rocks, and an isotope facility at Physical Research Laboratory, a geochronology laboratory at National geophysical Research Institute and an Accelerator Mass Spectrometer for radiocarbon dating at the Institute of Physics, Bhubaneswar, the first such facility in India. His studies have been detailed in several peer reviewed articles; (Note: Please see Selected bibliography section) a number of them have been listed by online article repositories such as ResearchGate and Google Scholar. He has been associated with many science journals including the Academy Proceedings in Earth and Planetary Sciences as a member of their editorial boards and has delivered several invited or plenary lectures. His work has been cited by many authors and he has also mentored 8 doctoral scholars in their studies.

== Awards and honours ==
Gopalan, a Fulbright scholar during this doctoral studies, received the Krishnan Medal of the Indian Geophysical Union in 1982. The Council of Scientific and Industrial Research awarded him the Shanti Swarup Bhatnagar Prize, one of the highest Indian science awards, the same year. He was awarded the Eminent Mass Spectrometrist Award of the Indian Society for Mass Spectrometry in 1991. The Indian Academy of Sciences elected him as a fellow in 1986, followed by Indian National Science Academy in 1986, Indian Geophysical Union in 1988 and the National Academy of Sciences, India in 1992.

== Selected bibliography ==
- K. Gopalan; J. R. Trivedi; M. N. Balasubrahmanyan; S. K. Ray; C. Anjaneya Sastry (September 1979). "Rb-Sr Chronology of the Khetri Copper Belt, Rajasthan". Geological Society of India. 20 (9).
- R. Murari; P. Krishnamurthy; P. I. Tikhonenko; K. Gopalan (December 1993). "Magnesian Ilmenites in Picrite Basalts from Siberian and Deccan Traps—Additional Mineralogical Evidence for Primary Melt Compositions(?)". Mineralogical Magazine. 57 (389): 733–735. Bibcode:1993MinM...57..733M. doi:10.1180/minmag.1993.057.389.18. S2CID 129759160.
- Kunchithapadam Gopalan; J. Douglas Macdougall; Christopher Macisaac (September 2007). "High Precision Determination of 48Ca/42Ca Ratio by TIMS for Ca Isotope Fractionation Studies". Geostandards and Geoanalytical Research. 31 (3): 227–236. Bibcode:2007GGRes..31..227G. doi:10.1111/j.1751-908X.2007.00847.x. S2CID 94912050.
- K. Gopalan (April 2013). "A Simple Chemical Resistant Hotplate for Geochemical Applications". Geological Society of India. 81 (4): 455. Bibcode:2013JGSI...81..455G. doi:10.1007/s12594-013-0061-3. S2CID 140176680.
- K. Gopalan; A. Kumar; S. Kumar; B. Vijayagopal (August 2013). "Depositional history of the Upper Vindhyan succession, central India: Time constraints from Pb–Pb isochron ages of its carbonate components". Precambrian Research. 233: 108–117. Bibcode:2013PreR..233..108G. doi:10.1016/j.precamres.2013.04.014.

== See also ==
- George Wetherill
- Mare Tranquillitatis
- Rb-Sr dating
- Argon–argon dating
