= Sampat Kumar Tandon =

Indian geologist (born 1945)

- Born: 13 August 1945 (age 81); Delhi, India
- Education: University of Cambridge; Panjab University; University of Delhi
- Known for: Studies on the magnetostratigraphy of the Siwalik rocks
- Awards: 1974 INSA Young Scientists Medal; 1985 IGU Krishnan Medal; 1988 Shanti Swarup Bhatnagar Prize; 2009 Ordre des Palmes Académiques
- Scientific career
- Fields: Physical stratigraphy; Quaternary geology
- Workplaces: IIT Delhi; Wadia Institute of Himalayan Geology; University of Delhi
- Doctoral advisor: H. Okada; P. F. Friend

Sampat Kumar Tandon (born 13 August 1945) is an Indian geologist and a professor emeritus of geology at the University of Delhi. He is a former pro-vice chancellor of Delhi University, Sir J. C. Bose Chair Professor of the department of Earth and Environmental Sciences at the Indian Institute of Science Education and Research, Bhopal and a D. N. Wadia Chair Professor of the department of Earth Sciences at the Indian Institute of Technology, Kanpur.

Tandon is known for his geological studies of the Siwalik rocks and is an elected fellow of all the three major Indian science academies viz. the Indian Academy of Sciences, Indian National Science Academy, and the National Academy of Sciences, India as well as The World Academy of Sciences. The Council of Scientific and Industrial Research, the apex agency of the Government of India for scientific research, awarded him the Shanti Swarup Bhatnagar Prize for Science and Technology, one of the highest Indian science awards for his contributions to Earth, Atmosphere, Ocean and Planetary Sciences in 1988. (Note: Long link - please select award year to see details) He was knighted by the Government of France with the title, Chevalier of the Ordre des Palmes Académiques in 2009.

== Biography ==
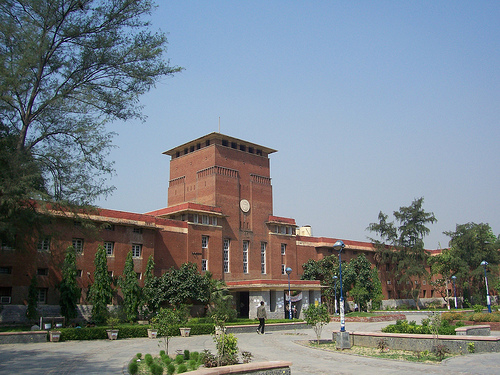
University of Delhi

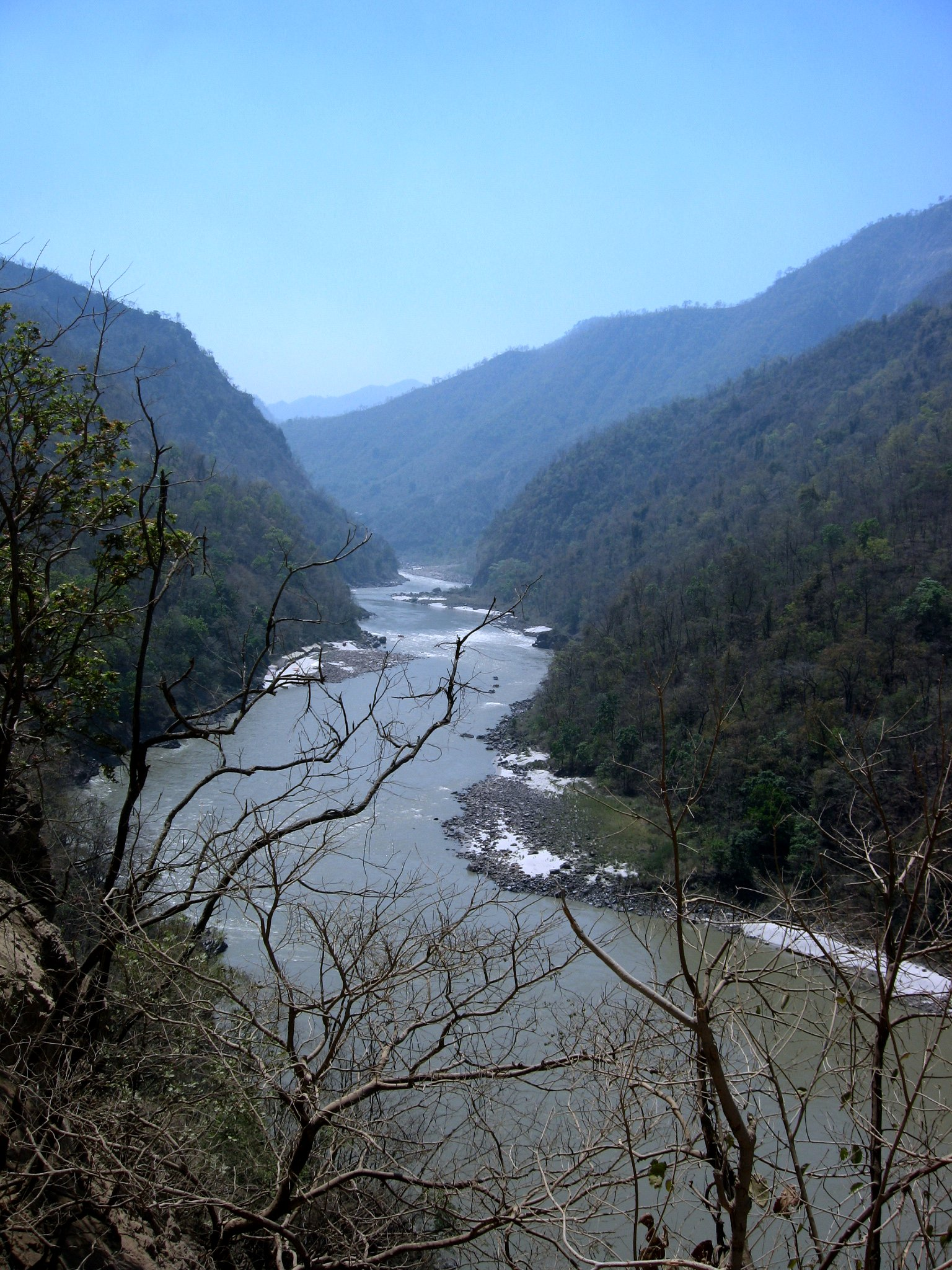
Shivalik ranges

S. K. Tandon, born on 13 August 1945 in the Indian capital of Delhi to Piara Lal Tandon and Karam Devi, completed his Senior Cambridge in 1961 and did his graduate studies (BSc hons) at Panjab University during 1961–65 after which he obtained a master's degree (MSc hons) from the same university in 1966. His doctoral studies were at the University of Delhi and after securing a PhD, he joined the Indian Institute of Technology, Delhi as a lecturer in 1966. Two years later, he shifted to Wadia Institute of Himalayan Geology as a scientific officer and in 1976, he returned to Delhi University as a member of faculty. He served the institution in various capacities; as the head of the department of geology from 1990 to 1993, dean of the faculty of science from 1992 to 1993 and as dean of the research and international relations from 2001 to 2006 before becoming the pro-vice chancellor of the university in 2005, a post he held till 2010. In between, he did his post-doctoral studies at the Institute of Geosciences of Shizuoka University in 1981 with H. Okada and at the Department of Earth Sciences of University of Cambridge during 1984-85 under the guidance of P. F. Friend. During his service at Delhi University, he chaired several bodies and empowered committees of the university such as the Governing Body of Ram Lal Anand College (1994–95), Academic Reforms and Accountability Committee (2002–03), Restructuring Undergraduate Science Programs Committee (2002–05), Committee for Designing B.Sc. (Hons.) course in Computer Science and the Committee for Restructuring M.Phil Courses.

Tandon served as a visiting professor at the University of Guelph in 1982 and as a Royal Society fellow at the University of Cambridge during 1984–85. He was a visiting scientist at Shizuoka University in 1981 and 1988, (Note: on Indian National Science Academy fellowship) at the French National Center for Scientific Research in 1985, at Japan Society for Promotion of Science in 1988, (Note: on Indian National Science Academy fellowship) at University of East Anglia in 1992 and 1997, (Note: on Indian National Science Academy / Royal Society fellowship) at Dalhousie University during 1993–94 (Note: on Commonwealth Scholarship and Fellowship Plan) and at University of Karlsruhe in 2002. (Note: on Indian National Science Academy / Deutsche Forschungsgemeinschaft fellowship) He was a member of the vice chancellors' delegation to France and Delhi University delegation to Kabul University in 2006. He was involved with the Indo-Hungarian Research Project sponsored by the Department of Science and Technology and visited Geological Institute, Budapest in 2006 and 2007 and paid visits to the University of Durham in 2008 and 2009 in association with the Indo-UKEIRI Program.

Tandon is married to Anita Mehrotra and the couple has two sons, Aditya and Amitabh. The family lives in Delhi.

== Legacy ==
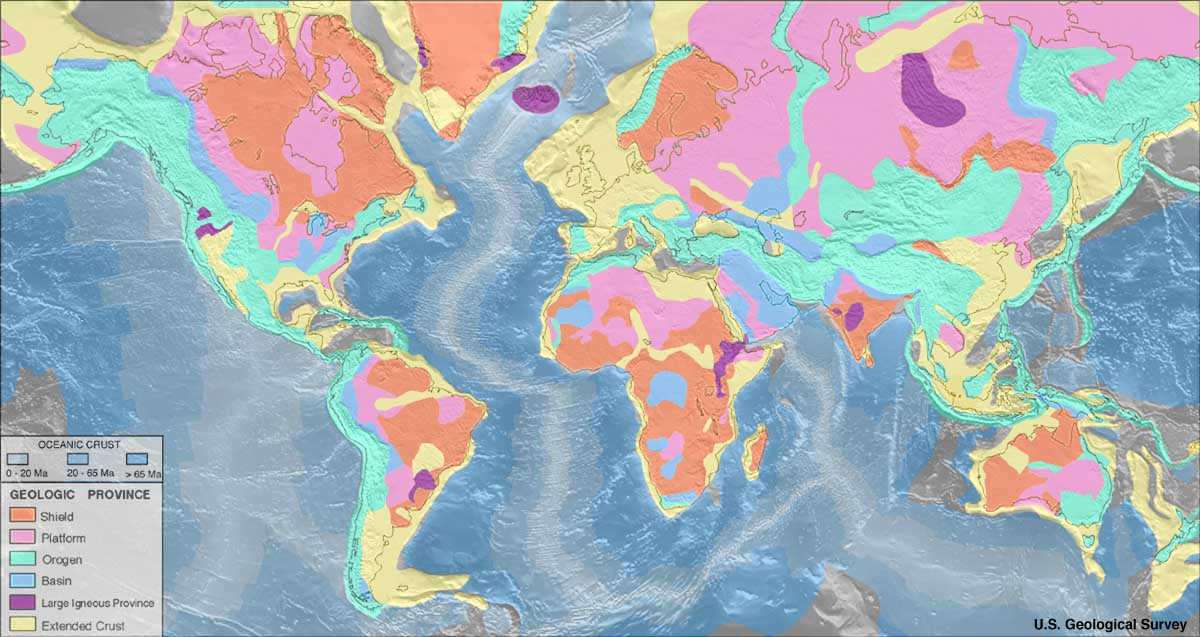
The Deccan Traps shown as dark purple spot on the geologic map of India

Tandon is known to have done extensive researches on sedimentary tectonics and magnetostratigraphy and his work on the Siwalik rocks is reported to have assisted in the wider understanding of this tectonically dynamic region of the Himalayas. He pioneered the physical dating techniques such as magnetic polarity, luminescence dating, fission track dating of zircons in India and he contributed to reconstruct the Late Cretaceous palaeogeography of Central India which revealed the impact of Deccan volcanism on contemporary sedimentary environments. His studies have been detailed in several peer reviewed articles; (Note: Please see Selected bibliography section) ResearchGate and Google Scholar, two online repositories of scientific articles has listed 110 and 180 of them respectively. He sat in several government agencies as a member. He was a member of the project advisory committees of the Department of Science and Technology (1994–97), Council of Scientific and Industrial Research (2001–05), Integrated Long-Term Program (2001–04) and Central Groundwater Board (2001–04) and chaired the Project Advisory Committee of the DST during 1998–2000. He also chaired the Research Advisory Committees of Wadia Institute of Himalayan Geology (2004–07) and Young Scientists Fast Track Scheme (Earth Sciences) of DST (2005–08) besides being associated with several other councils and committees as a member. He presided the Indian Association of Sedimentologists (2003–12), and served as the vice president of the Geological Society of India during 2007-10 and 2010-13. He was a councillor of International Union of Geological Sciences (IUGS) during 2010-14 and has been serving as the vice president of the Indian Mineralogists Association since 2005. He was the convenor of the editorial committee of the University Grants Commission of India for promoting research at educational institutions in 2004 and was a member of the editorial board of Current Science (2003–13) and the Proceedings in Earth and Planetary Sciences of the Indian Academy of Sciences. He is the incumbent chairman of the research advisory council of Birbal Sahni Institute of Palaeobotany and a member of the advisory committee of the Indian Statistical Institute.

== Awards and honors ==
Tandon received the Young Scientists Medal of the Indian National Science Academy in 1974 and the Krishnan Medal of the Indian Geophysical Union reached him in 1985. The Indian Academy of Sciences elected him as a fellow in 1987 and the Council of Scientific and Industrial Research awarded him the Shanti Swarup Bhatnagar Prize, one of the highest Indian science awards, in 1988. The year 1999 brought him two elected fellowships, that of the Indian National Science Academy and the National Academy of Sciences, India. He was elected as a fellow by The World Academy of Sciences in 2001 and the Government of France honored him with the Chevalier dans l’Ordre des Palmes Academiques in 2009. The award orations delivered by him include Professor K.P. Rode Memorial Lecture of the Indian Science Congress Association in 2000 and the VII Karunakaran Endowment Memorial Lecture of Centre for Earth Science Studies, Thiruvananthapuram in 2006.

== Selected bibliography ==
- Sinha, R.; Bhattacharjee, P. S.; Sangode, S. J.; Gibling, M. R.; Tandon, S. K.; Jaine, M.; Godfrey Smith, D. (2007). "Valley and interfluve sediments in the Southern Ganga plains, India: exploring facies and magnetic signatures". Sedimentary Geology. 201 (3–4): 386–411. Bibcode:2007SedG..201..386S. doi:10.1016/j.sedgeo.2007.07.004. S2CID 140711872.
- Singh, Vimal; Tandon, S. K. (2008). "The Pinjaur dun (intermontane longitudinal valley) and associated active mountain fronts, NW Himalaya: tectonic geomorphology and morphotectonic evolution". Geomorphology. 102 (3–4): 376–394. Bibcode:2008Geomo.102..376S. doi:10.1016/j.geomorph.2008.04.008.
- Saini, H. S.; Tandon, S. K.; Mujtaba, S. A. I.; Pant, N. C.; Khorana, R. K. (2009). "Reconstruction of buried channel-floodplain systems of the northwestern Haryana Plains and their relation to the 'Vedic' Saraswati". Current Science. 97 (11): 1634–1643.
- Singh, Vimal; Tandon, S. K. (2010). "Integrated analysis of structures and landforms of an intermontane longitudinal valley (Pinjaur dun) and its associated mountain fronts in the NW Himalaya". Geomorphology. 114 (4): 573–589. Bibcode:2010Geomo.114..573S. doi:10.1016/j.geomorph.2009.09.019.
- Nador, Annamaria; Sinha, Rajiv; Magyari, Arpad; Tandon, Sampat K.; Medzihradszky, Zsofia; Babinszki, Edit; Bozso, Edit Thamo; Unger, Zoltan; Singh, Ashish (2011). "Late quaternary (weichselian) alluvial history and neotectonic control on fluvial landscape development in the southern Körös plain, Hungary". Palaeogeography, Palaeoclimatology, Palaeoecology. 299 (1–2): 1–14. Bibcode:2011PPP...299....1N. doi:10.1016/j.palaeo.2010.09.018.

== See also ==
- Magnetostratigraphy
- List of foreign recipients of the Ordre des Palmes Académiques
- Deccan Traps
- Palaeogeography
