= Janardan Ganpatrao Negi =

Indian theoretical geophysicist and emeritus scientist

- Born: 1 August 1936; Khidhgaon, khandwa District, Madhya Pradesh, India
- Died: 9 November 2016 (aged 80); Hyderabad, Andhra Pradesh, India
- Education: MLB Govt. College of Excellence; Dan Singh Bisht Government College; IIT Kharagpur
- Known for: Studies on geoelectromagnetics and geomagnetism
- Awards: 1974 IGU Krishnan Medal; 1980 Shanti Swarup Bhatnagar Prize; 1991 Association of Exploration Geophysicists Award; 1991 AEG Lifetime Achievement Award; Holkar Science College Centenary Award; Vigyan Ratna
- Scientific career
- Fields: Theoretical geophysics
- Workplaces: Holkar Science College; IIT Kharagpur; National Geophysical Research Institute

Janardan Ganpatrao Negi (1 August 1936 – 9 November 2016) was an Indian theoretical geophysicist and emeritus scientist at National Geophysical Research Institute.

He is known for his studies on geoelectromagnetics and geomagnetism and is an elected fellow of the Royal Astronomical Society, London and the National Academy of Sciences, India.

The Council of Scientific and Industrial Research, the apex agency of the Government of India for scientific research, awarded him the Shanti Swarup Bhatnagar Prize for Science and Technology, one of the highest Indian science awards for his contributions to Earth, Atmosphere, Ocean and Planetary Sciences in 1980.

== Biography ==
Holkar Science College in 1964

J. G. Negi, born on 1 August 1936 in the tribal village of Khidhgaon of Khandwa district East Nimar in the Indian state of Madhya Pradesh to Ganpatrao and Laxmi Devi, completed his graduate studies in science at Victoria College (present-day MLB Government College of Excellence) in 1956 before obtaining a master's degree from Dan Singh Bisht Government College, Nainital in 1958.

His academic career started at Holkar Science College of Jiwaji University as a lecturer where he worked from 1958 to 1959 during which time he enrolled at the Indian Institute of Technology, Kharagpur for his doctoral studies and secured a PhD in 1962. He continued at IIT Kharagpur for two more years as a research scholar and joined National Geophysical Research Institute, Hyderabad in 1964 as a senior scientific officer. He spent the rest of his official career at NGRI, serving in such various positions as assistant director (1971–79), senior assistant director (1979–82), deputy director (1982–83), senior deputy director (1983–90) and director grade scientist to superannuate from service in 1996 as the director. Post retirement, he serves as an emeritus scientist of the institute.

Negi's theoretical studies have been focusing on the areas of geoelectromagnetics and geomagnetism of geophysics and his researches have assisted in the wider understanding of gravity, heat flow and electromagnetic fields of Earth's surface. His studies have been detailed in a book, Anisotropy in Geoelectromagnetism, as chapters in books by others, and as several peer reviewed articles (Note: Please see Selected bibliography section) and his work has been cited by many authors. He headed the Madhya Pradesh Council of Science and Technology as its director general and served as the scientific advisor to the Government of Madhya Pradesh for two terms during 1992–94 and 2005–06. When the Institute of Seismological Research, Gandhinagar was established in 2003, he served as the founder director general of the institution till 2005. He is a former UNESCO lecturer and a visiting faculty at many universities including Cooperative Institute for Research in Environmental Sciences, Federal University of Bahia and Federal University of Pará.

Negi is married to Asha Billore and the couple has two sons, Atul and Madhav. He died on 9 November 2016, in Hyderabad, at the age of 80.

== Awards and honors ==
Negi received the Krishnan Medal of the Indian Geophysical Union in 1974. The Council of Scientific and Industrial Research awarded him the Shanti Swarup Bhatnagar Prize, one of the highest Indian science awards, in 1980. A life fellow of the Royal Astronomical Society, he was elected as a fellow by the National Academy of Sciences, India in 1984, the same year as he received the National Lectureship of the University Grants Commission of India. He is also a recipient of the Holkar Science College Centenary Award, Vigyan Ratna and the 1991 Lifetime Achievement Award of the Association of Exploration Geophysicists. The award orations delivered by him include the Dr. H. N. Siddique Memorial Lecture of the Indian Geophysical Union in 2003.

== Selected bibliography ==
=== Books ===
- J. G. Negi; P. D. Saraf (1989). Anisotropy in geoelectromagnetism. Elsevier. ISBN 978-0-444-87495-5.

=== Chapters ===
- S. Böhme; U. Esser; H. Hefele, I. Heinrich, W. Hofmann, D. Krahn, V. R. Matas, L. D. Schmadel, G. Zech (11 November 2013). Literature 1987. Springer Science & Business Media. pp. 436–. ISBN 978-3-662-12358-4.

=== Articles ===
- J. G. Negi (1966). "Convergence and Divergence in Gravity and Magnetic Interpretation". Nature. 210 (5036) (published May 1996): 616–617. Bibcode:1966Natur.210..616N. doi:10.1038/210616b0. S2CID 4208224.
- JG Negi; OP Pandey; PK Agrawal (1986). "Super-mobility of hot Indian lithosphere". Tectonophysics. 131 (1–2) (published November 1986): 147–156. Bibcode:1986Tectp.131..147N. doi:10.1016/0040-1951(86)90272-6.
- JG Negi; PK Agrawal; OP Pandey (1987). "Large variation of Curie depth and lithospheric thickness beneath the Indian subcontinent and a case for magnetothermometry". Geophysical Journal International. 83 (6) (published March 1987): 763–775. Bibcode:1987GeoJ...88..763N. doi:10.1111/j.1365-246X.1987.tb01655.x.
- JG Negi; PK Agrawal; OP Pandey (1993). "A possible KT boundary bolide impact site offshore near Bombay and triggering of rapid Deccan volcanism". Physics of the Earth and Planetary Interiors. 76 (3) (published March 1993): 189–197. Bibcode:1993PEPI...76..189N. doi:10.1016/0031-9201(93)90011-W.
- OP Pandey; PK Agrawal; JG Negi (1995). "Lithospheric structure beneath Laxmi Ridge and late Cretaceous geodynamic events". Geo-Marine Letters. 15 (2) (published June 1995): 85–91. Bibcode:1995GML....15...85P. doi:10.1007/BF01275411. S2CID 140625794.

== See also ==
- Geomagnetism
