= Shyam Sundar Rai =

Indian seismologist

- Born: 16 March 1954 (age 72); Chandauli, Uttar Pradesh, India
- Education: Banaras Hindu University; IIT Roorkee; IIT Dhanbad; University of Toronto
- Known for: Studies on the seismic structure of Indian continental lithosphere
- Awards: 1988 CSIR Young Scientist Award; 1991 Krishnan Medal; 1996 S. S. Bhatnagar Prize; 2004 National Geoscience Award; 2006 GoAP Scientist Award; 2016 National Award in Geoscience and Technology
- Scientific career
- Fields: Seismology
- Workplaces: National Geophysical Research Institute; University of Kiel; Hirosaki University; IISER Pune

Shyam Sundar Rai (born 16 March 1954, Chandauli, U.P) is an Indian seismologist and a former chair professor (now an emeritus professor) at the department of Earth and Climate Science of the Indian Institute of Science Education and Research, Pune. He is known for his researches on the seismic structure of Indian continental lithosphere and is an elected fellow of all the three major Indian science academies viz. Indian National Science Academy, Indian Academy of Sciences, and the National Academy of Sciences, India as well as of the Indian Geophysical Union. The Council of Scientific and Industrial Research, the apex agency of the Government of India for scientific research, awarded him the Shanti Swarup Bhatnagar Prize for Science and Technology, one of the highest Indian science awards for his contributions to Earth, Atmosphere, Ocean and Planetary Sciences in 1996. (Note: Long link - please select award year to see details)

== Biography ==
S. S. Rai, born on 16 March 1954 in the Indian state of Uttar Pradesh, graduated in science (BSc hons) from Banaras Hindu University in 1973 and obtained a master's degree in engineering (MTech) from the Indian Institute of Technology Roorkee (then known as the University of Roorkee) in 1977. He started his career as a senior scientific assistant at the National Geophysical Research Institute (NGRI) of the Council of Scientific and Industrial Research and stayed with the institute for the rest of his career. Simultaneously, he did his doctoral studies at the Indian School of Mines to secure a PhD in 1988. He also had three stints abroad; as a UNDP fellow at the University of Toronto in 1981, as a German Academic Exchange Service fellow at the University of Kiel during 1986–88 and as a Japan Society for the Promotion of Science senior fellow at Hirosaki University in 1998. He held various positions of a junior scientist to Chief scientist at NGRI before his superannuation in 2014. In between, he also served as a professor at the Indian Institute of Science Education and Research (IISER) Kolkata during 2009–10. He moved to the Indian Institute of Science Education and Research Pune as founding Chair and Professor ( 2014-2019) of the Department of Earth and Climate Science.

== Legacy ==
Continental collision

Rai's researches have been focusing on the seismic structure of Indian continental lithosphere and his work has assisted in widening the understanding of its geotectonic evolution. His later studies on the seismic tomography of the region provided explanations to Indo-Asian continental collision. These studies are known to have helped in developing methodologies to target mineralized zones, ground water aquifers and kimberlite pipes. His contributions are reported in the preparation of a 3-D velocity image of the Indian subcontinent, identification and demarcation of Indian lithosphere in Western Tibet, and the later day exploration of diamond bearing Kimberlites in the eastern Dharwar Craton of South India. His studies have been detailed in several peer-reviewed articles; (Note: Please see Selected bibliography section) ResearchGate and Google Scholar, two online repositories of scientific articles, have listed 478 and 98 of them respectively. He was associated with the Indian Academy of Sciences as a member of its sectional committee during 1999–2002 and 2008–09 and as a council member during 2013–15. He also sat in the council of the Indian National Science Academy during 2011–13.

== Awards and honors ==
Rai, who held the Senior Associateship of the Abdus Salam International Centre for Theoretical Physics during 1994–2008 and the J. C. Bose National fellowship in 2010, received the Young Scientist Award of the Council of Scientific and Industrial Research in 1988 and the Krishnan Medal of the Indian Geophysical Union in 1991. The Council of Scientific and Industrial Research honored him again in 1996 with the Shanti Swarup Bhatnagar Prize, one of the highest Indian science awards. The Ministry of Mines awarded him the National Geoscience Award in 2004 and the Scientist Award of the Government of Andhra Pradesh reached him two years later. In 2016, the Ministry of Earth Sciences awarded him the National Award in Geoscience and Technology. The Indian Academy of Sciences elected him as its fellow in 1996 and the other two major Indian science academies, the National Academy of Sciences, India and the Indian National Science Academy, followed suit in 2005 and 2009 respectively. He is also an elected fellow of Indian Geophysical Union. The Indian National Science Academy honored him with Professor K. Naha Memorial Award in 2019. The IIT (Roorkee) and IIT (ISM, Dhanbad) honored Professor Rai with their Distinguished Alumnus award.

== Selected bibliography ==
- Prakasam, K. S.; Rai, S. S. (1998). "Teleseismic delay-time tomography of the upper mantle beneath Southeastern India: imprint of Indo-Antarctica rifting". Geophysical Journal International. 133 (1): 20–30. Bibcode:1998GeoJI.133...20P. doi:10.1046/j.1365-246X.1998.1331453.x.
- Rai, S. S.; Singh, Sunil K.; Rajagopal Sarma, P. V. S. S.; Srinagesh, D.; Reddy, K. N. S.; Prakasam, K. S.; Satyanarayana, Y. (1999). "What triggers Koyna region earthquakes? Preliminary results from seismic tomography digital array". Proceedings of the Indian Academy of Sciences - Earth and Planetary Sciences. 108 (1): 1–14. Bibcode:1999InEPS.108....1R. doi:10.1007/BF02840820. S2CID 129876385.
- Mitra, S.; Priestley, K.; Gaur, V. K.; Rai, S. S.; Haines, J. (2006). "Variation of rayleigh wave group velocity dispersion and seismic heterogeneity of the Indian crust and uppermost mantle". Geophysical Journal International. 164 (1): 88–98. Bibcode:2006GeoJI.164...88M. doi:10.1111/j.1365-246X.2005.02837.x.
- Kiselev, S.; Vinnik, L.; Oreshin, S.; Gupta, S.; Rai, S. S.; Singh, A.; Kumar, M. R.; Mohan, G. (2008). "Lithosphere of the Dharwar craton by joint inversion of P and S receiver functions". Geophysical Journal International. 173 (3): 1106–1118. Bibcode:2008GeoJI.173.1106K. doi:10.1111/j.1365-246X.2008.03777.x.
- Ashish; Padhi, Amit; Rai, S. S.; Gupta, Sandeep (2009). "Seismological evidence for shallow crustal melt beneath the Garhwal High Himalaya, India: implications for the Himalayan channel flow". Geophysical Journal International. 177 (3): 1111–1120. Bibcode:2009GeoJI.177.1111A. doi:10.1111/j.1365-246X.2009.04112.x.

== See also ==
- Plate tectonics
