= Ashok Kumar Singhvi =

Indian geoscientist

Ashok Singhvi
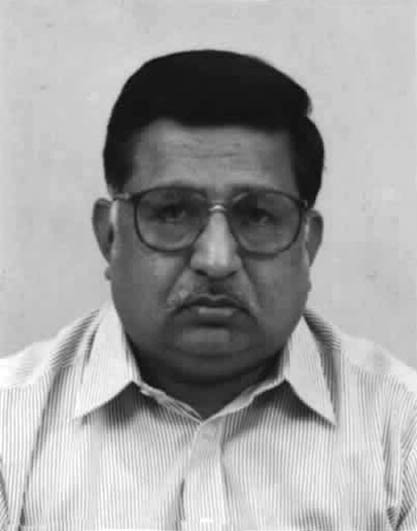
- Born: 1950 (age 75–76); Jodhpur, India
- Education: University of Oxford, Indian Institute of Technology, Jodhpur University
- Known for: Thermoluminescence
- Awards: Krishnan Medal, El-Baz Award Geological Society of America, Indian National Science Academy
- Scientific career
- Fields: Geophysics
- Workplaces: Physical Research Laboratory

Ashok Kumar Singhvi is an Indian geoscientist and former Dean of Physical Research Laboratory. His field of expertise is Geophysics, Quaternary Sciences and Quantitative Geomorphology.

== Career ==
Singhvi graduated with an MSc from Jodhpur University, Rajasthan. He earned a PhD (Nuclear Physics) (1976) from Indian Institute of Technology Kanpur for studies on hyperfine interaction, Mossbauer spectroscopy and nuclear reactions. He then joined the Geosciences Group at the Physical Research Laboratory (PRL), Ahmedabad, India in 1976 as a Postdoctoral Fellow, where he began applying mineral spectroscopy to study paleoclimates. From 1977 to 1978, he worked with Dr. Martin Aitkin at Keble College, University of Oxford, UK as a Ford Foundation Fellow, where he began thermoluminescence dating of sedimentary deposits in desert sands.

== Research ==
Prof. Singhvi's contribution in helping adopt thermoluminescence to date sedimentary deposits is a major method to measure paleoclimatic processes on geological timescales. His laboratory at PRL established thermoluminescence dating in India. Using luminescence spectroscopy of natural minerals in sand sediments, his group has dated various minerals across hot and cold deserts, including quartz, feldspar, gypsum, soil carbonates, carbonates, archeological sediments, glacial ice, geological faults and earthquakes, and meteorites. These studies have provided insights into monsoon trajectories, birth of deserts, wind patterns and tsunamis across multiple deserts, understanding climate–landform relationship and modeling climate activity in various regions including the Ganges plains and the Persian Gulf. More recently, his studies have contributed to understanding the origins of Indian Middle Palaeolithic culture and modern human dispersals.

Singhvi's leadership includes leading India's membership to the International Quaternary Union (INQUA) and led the Indian delegation to IUGS in 2004 and 2008. He has also served on the Research Advisory Committee (RAC) of the National Geological Research Institute (Hyderabad), Wadia Institute of Himalayan Geology (Dehradun), the Birbal Sahni Institute (Lucknow), the Geological Survey of India and the Archaeological Survey of India. Singhvi has been a Ford Foundation Fellow (University of Oxford and University of Missouri-St. Louis); A.v. Humboldt Fellow (University of Heidelberg), Lever Hulme Fellow (University of Sheffield), DFG Professor (University of Freiberg), Academy Professor (São Paulo) and Visiting Professor (USGS Denver). In his career, Singhvi has co-authored over 300 articles (8000+ citations), edited/authored about 12 conference proceedings/books.

== Awards and honors ==
Notable awards to Singhvi include the Krishnan Medal (1988), National Mineral Award by the MInistry of Mines, Government of India (2004), Farouk El-Baz Award for Desert Research by Geological Society of America (2003), the Decennial Medal by the Indian Geophysical Union (2006), the triennial K Naha Medal (2007), Goyal Prize (2009), SM Khaitan Gold Medal, and JC Bose National Fellowship.

He is an elected member of the Third World Academy of Sciences, Indian National Science Academy, Gujarat Science Academy (as President until 2019), Indian Academy of Sciences, The Indian Geophysical Union, and National Academy of Sciences (Allahabad, India), and the Luminescence Society of India (as President 1990–1992). Singhvi has served as the vice-president of the Indian National Science Academy (2018–2021).
