= Vijay Prasad Dimri =

Indian geophysical scientist

- Born: 1948 (age 77–78); Dimmar, Chamoli, Uttarakhand, India
- Occupation: Geophysical scientist
- Spouse: Kusum Dimri
- Parent: Ghanshyam Dimri
- Awards: Padma Shri; Sir Axford Lecture Award; Lorenz Lecture Award; National Award for Geoscience and Technology, MoES; Prof. G. P. Chatterjee Award; FAPCCI Outstanding Scientist Award; Department of Ocean Development Award; National Mineral Award; IGU Hari Narayan Lifetime Achievement Award; BASANT SAMMAN Award by ISM Dhanbad.
- Website: www.vijaydimri.com

Vijay Prasad Dimri is an Indian geophysical scientist, known for his contributions in opening up a new research area in Earth sciences by establishing a parallelism between deconvolution and inversion, the two vital geophysical signal processing tools deployed in minerals and oil and gas exploration. In 2010, the Government of India awarded him with the Padma Shri, India's fourth highest civilian award, for his contributions to the fields of science and technology.

== Biography ==
Lidar is a remote sensing technology that measures distance by illuminating a target with a laser and analyzing the reflected light. The term Lidar comes from combining the words light and radar, explains Dr. Dimri about the Light Detection and Ranging system (LIDAR).

Dimri was born in 1948[6] at a small hamlet called Dimmar in Chamoli district.[7] His post graduate and doctoral studies were at the Indian School of Mines, Dhanbad.[2][6][8][9] He received post doctoral fellowship from Norway (1986–88) for higher studies and research in Norway[6] and a German Academic Exchange Service (DAAD) fellowship (1996) for higher research at the University of Kiel, Germany[2] and also further training in Germany and at the Norwegian Research Council, Oslo.[2]

Dimri's career started at the National Geophysical Research Institute (NGRI) in 1970 where he rose in ranks to reach the position of the director in 2001, a position he held till 2010. He is also an honorary Professor at Andhra University and holds the position of adjunct professor at Indian Institute of Technology, Kharagpur and the Osmania University, Hyderabad.

In 2010, retiring from the NGRI, Dimri joined Gujarat Energy Research and Management Institute (GERMI), Gandhinagar and is the incumbent director there. He is a national correspondent of The International Association for the Physical Sciences of the Oceans and sits on the Scientific Planning and Review committee of the International Council for Science (ICSU).

== Legacy ==
One of the first scientific achievements of Dimri related to the mineral and oil and gas explorations. He is reported to have developed a redesigned Wiener filter, a common equipment used seismic deconvolution procedure, for application in magnetic and inversion of gravity measurements for mapping susceptibility and subsurface density. Thus, he was successful in establishing a parallelism between deconvolution and inversion, two vital signal processing tools. He demonstrated experimentally that single channel and multi channel time varying filters are equivalent and algorithms for stationary data could be applied to stationary geophysical data processing as well. He also propounded the usage of maximum entropy method to nonstationary and complex geophysical data analysis. His book, Deconvolution and Inverse Theory, published by Elsevier in 1992, contained these findings and was reported to be accepted by other scientists such as Professor M. Koch, who called it a didactical masterpiece and is considered as a reference book on the subject.

- V. Dimri (1992). Deconvolution and Inverse Theory. Elsevier. ISBN 978-0-444-89493-9.

Dimitri is credited with the first quantification of gravity interpretation. He also hypothesized a covariance gravity model for the Bay of Bengal. He argued that the earthquakes in Koyna and Warna areas were triggered by the self organized fractal seismicity of the neighbourhood reservoir. He has also contributed to the geophysical data analysis, interpretation of earthquakes and exploration of hydrocarbons and groundwater. His current projects relate to the development of a Tsunami Wave Propagation model in the aftermath of the Tsunami of 2004 that originated from the sea earthquake of Sumatra region and setting up of a pilot project for enhanced oil recovery from India oil wells, a Norwegian collaborative project.

During his tenure at the National Geophysical Research Institute, Dimri formulated two programs, Gas+Hydrates and Legal Continental Shelf and organised a fluoride free water project in Nalgonda, Andhra Pradesh, for assessment, management and exploration of groundwater in hardrock terrains. During this time, NGRI emerged as a premier institute of geophysics, with NISCAIR, New Delhi rating it as the no. 1 in geophysical outputs among Indian institutes in 2006 and SCOPUS 2007 placing NGRI among the top 1 per cent in the world in terms of citations. It was during his period, NGRI commercialised its first patent.

Vijay Prasad Dimri is credited with over 125 research papers published in peer reviewed journals and six books, two authored and four edited works, brought out by publishers such as Elsevier, Springer and Balkema He also holds three patents of which one is accepted by the US.

== Positions ==
Vijay Prasad Dimri is the president of Andhra Pradesh Academy of Sciences from 2010 and the sectional president of the Earth Science section of Indian Science Congress Association since 2007. He is a former president of the Indian Geophysical Union from 2006 till 2010. He held the chair of the National Committee of International Union of Geodesy and Geophysics during 2005–07. He also serves as a member of the International Scientific Programme Committee and the National Academy of Sciences. He delivered the presidential address at the ISCA in 2008 and IGU convention in 2009 and holds the chair of the Research Advisory Council of the Indian Institute of Geomagnetism (IIG), Mumbai.

== Awards and recognitions ==
Dimri featured in the President's honors list in 2010 when he was selected for the civilian award of Padma Shri, by the Government of India. He is the first Asian to receive the Lorenz Lecture Award of the American Geophysical Union (2007) and has delivered the Sir Axford Award Lecture at the Asia Oceania Geosciences Society. He is also a recipient of Prof. G. P. Chatterjee Award of the Indian Science Congress (2007), Outstanding Scientist Award by The Federation of Andhra Pradesh Chambers of Commerce and Industry (2008), Department of Ocean Development Award (2004) and the National Mineral Award. Dimri was also invited to chair the proceedings of the 2nd edition of Geoconfluence, ISM Dhanbad's annual Geo-Technical fest (www.geoconfluence.in).

Dimri has been honored with fellowships by several scientific organizations such as The World Academy of Sciences, (TWAS) Italy, Indian National Science Academy (INSA), New Delhi, National Academy of Sciences, Allahabad, Indian Society of Applied Geochemists and AP Akademy of Sciences, Andhra Pradesh. He has been recognised as the CSIR-Distinguished Scientist by the CSIR-National Geophysical Research Institute, Hyderabad.

== See also ==
- National Geophysical Research Institute
