= NGRI =

NGRI may refer to:

- National Geophysical Research Institute
- Not guilty by reason of insanity, also known as insanity defense
