= Kolluru Sree Krishna =

Indian earth scientist

- Born: 15 October 1958 (age 67); Andhra Pradesh, India
- Education: Andhra University
- Known for: Studies on the evolution of Indian Ocean
- Awards: 1996 Krishnan Medal; 2001 S. S. Bhatnagar Prize; 2010 IGU Decennial Award; 2010 National Geoscience Award; 2013 IGU Annie Talwani Memorial Prize
- Scientific career
- Fields: Marine geology; Geophysics
- Workplaces: Texas Instruments; [CSIR - National Institute of Oceanography]; University of Hyderabad

Kolluru Sree Krishna (born 1958) is an Indian marine geophysicist and former chief scientist at the National Institute of Oceanography, India. He is known for his studies on the evolution of the Indian Ocean and is an elected fellow of all the three major Indian science academies: Indian National Science Academy, Indian Academy of Sciences, and the National Academy of Sciences, India. The Council of Scientific and Industrial Research, the apex agency of the Government of India for scientific research, awarded him the Shanti Swarup Bhatnagar Prize for Science and Technology, one of the highest Indian science awards for his contributions to Earth, Atmosphere, Ocean and Planetary Sciences in 2001. (Note: Long link - please select award year to see details)

== Biography ==
K. Sree Krishna, born on 15 October 1958, in the south Indian state of Andhra Pradesh, graduated in science from Andhra University in 1979 and completed his master's degree in geophysics from the same university in 1982. He started his career as a seismologist at Geophysical Service Inc., a subsidiary of Texas Instruments, in 1983 when the company was involved in the hydrocarbon explorations in the basins of Krishna-Godavari and Cauveri rivers and spent one year with the company. In 1984, he joined the National Institute of Oceanography, Goa (NIO) as a B-grade scientist where he holds the post of the chief scientist since 2009. In between, he held several scientist positions at NIO and also secured a PhD from Andhra University in 1996.

== Legacy ==
One of the most important contributions of Krishna is his studies on the evolution of Indian Ocean on which he developed tectonic models and validated the same. He conducted extensive studies on the lithospheric studies of the central Indian Ocean in relation to the uplift of the Himalayas and on the primary hotspots of the global oceans and mantle circulation for which he has undertaken ocean expeditions. His studies assisted in a wider understanding about the relationship between the rise of the Himalayas, the sedimentation in the Bay of Bengal and the Indian monsoon. His studies have been detailed in several peer-reviewed articles; (Note: Please see Selected bibliography section) ResearchGate, an online repository of scientific articles, has listed 85 of them.

Krishna was the convenor of the Fall Meeting of the American Geophysical Union in 2015 where he chaired the session on 16 December 2015 and presented a paper on Sediment dispersal pattern in the Bay of Bengal - evidence for commencement of Bengal Fan sedimentation. He has also been associated with several science journals; he served as the associate editor of the Solid Earth section of the Journal of Geophysical Research published by the American Geophysical Union from 2005 to 2010 and sat in the editorial boards of Indian Journal of Marine Sciences (2008–10), Proceedings of the Indian National Science Academy (2015) and the Association of Exploration Geophysicists (2015).

== Awards and honors ==
Sree Krishna received the Krishnan Medal of the Indian Geophysical Union in 1996; IGU would honor him again in 2010 with its Decennial Award. In between, the Council of Scientific and Industrial Research awarded him the Shanti Swarup Bhatnagar Prize, one of the highest Indian science awards in 2001. The year 2010 brought him another award in the form of the National Geosciences Award of the Ministry of Mines and he received the inaugural Annie Talwani Memorial Prize of the Indian Geophysical Union in 2013.

Krishna held two fellowships of the Royal Society of London; the INSA-Royal Society fellowship in 1999 and the international fellowship in 2008. The Indian Academy of Sciences elected him as its fellow in 2002 and the other two major Indian science academies, the National Academy of Sciences, India and the Indian National Science Academy followed suit in 2010 and 2013 respectively. He is also an elected fellow of the Indian Geophysical Union (2002) and the Andhra Pradesh Akademi of Sciences (2011). He also held the J. C. Bose National Fellowship of the Department of Science and Technology in 2012 and the award orations delivered by him include the 2016 S. Balakrishna Memorial Lecture of the Telangana Academy of Sciences.

== Selected bibliography ==
- Krishna, K. S., Mohammad Ismaiel, Karlapati Srinivas, D. Gopala Rao, J Mishra, D Saha (2016). "Sediment pathways and emergence of Himalayan source material in the Bay of Bengal". Current Science. 110 (3): 363–372. doi:10.18520/cs/v110/i3/363-372. S2CID 55772329.
- Krishna, K. S.; Michael, Laju; Bhattacharyya, R.; Majumdar, T. J. (2009). "Geoid and gravity anomaly data of conjugate regions of Bay of Bengal and Enderby Basin: new constraints on breakup and early spreading history between India and Antarctica". Journal of Geophysical Research. 114 (B3). Bibcode:2009JGRB..114.3102K. doi:10.1029/2008JB005808. S2CID 128422030.
- Chatterjee, Sirsendu; Bhattacharyya, Rudradeb; Michael, Laju; Krishna, K. S.; Majumdar, Tapan Jyoti (2007). "Validation of ERS-1 and high-resolution satellite gravity with in-situ shipborne gravity over the Indian offshore regions: accuracies and implications to subsurface modeling". Marine Geodesy. 30 (3): 197–216. Bibcode:2007MarGe..30..197C. doi:10.1080/01490410701438323. S2CID 129383692.
- Krishna, K. S.; Gopala Rao, D.; Neprochnov, Yu. P. (2002). "Formation of diapiric structure in the deformation zone, central Indian Ocean: a model from gravity and seismic reflection data". Proceedings of the Indian Academy of Sciences - Earth and Planetary Sciences. 111 (1): 17–28. Bibcode:2002InEPS.111...17K. doi:10.1007/BF02702219. S2CID 129257397.
- Krishna, K. S.; Gopala Rao, D.; Subba Raju, L. V.; Chaubey, A. K.; Shcherbakov, V. S.; Pilipenko, A. I.; Radhakrishna Murthy, I. V. (1999). "Paleocene on-spreading-axis hotspot volcanism along the Ninetyeast Ridge: an interaction between the Kerguelen hotspot and the Wharton spreading center". Proceedings of the Indian Academy of Sciences - Earth and Planetary Sciences. 108 (4): 255–267. Bibcode:1999InEPS.108..255K. doi:10.1007/BF02840503. S2CID 140150739.

== See also ==
- Monsoon of South Asia
- Prashant Goswami
