= Dimri =

Dimri is a topnymic Indian (Sarola Brahmin) surname from Dimmar, a village near Karnaprayag in Uttarakhand, India. Notable people with this surname include:

- Preeti Dimri (born 1986), an Indian cricketer
- Shital Dimri, an Indian television actress
- Triptii Dimri (born 1994), an Indian actress in Hindi cinema
- Vijay Prasad Dimri, an Indian geophysicist
- Yogendra Dimri, a lieutenant general in the Indian Army
