= Prabhat C. Chandra =

Indian geophysicist

Prabhat C Chandra
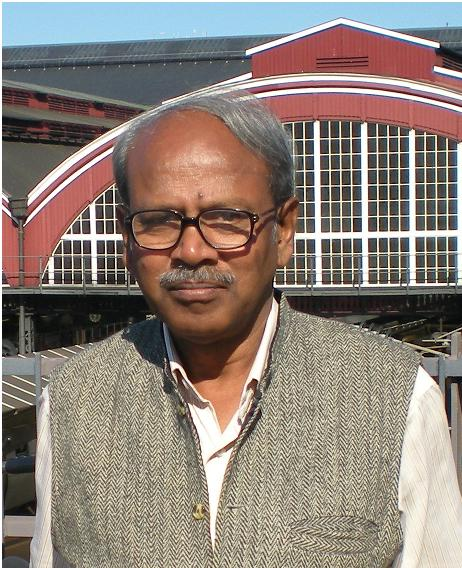
- Chandra in 2010
- Born: 4 December 1950 (age 75); Varanasi, India
- Citizenship: Indian
- Education: NGRI, CSIR, Hyderabad, Banaras Hindu University, Varanasi
- Spouse: Durga Chandra (1983–present)
- Scientific career
- Fields: Hydro Geophysics

Prabhat C Chandra (born 4 December 1950) is an Indian geophysicist. Since 1973, he has done extensive work in the field of hydrogeophysics, encompassing groundwater exploration, development and management with a specialization in groundwater geophysics using various geophysical methods.

== Early life and education ==
He was born in Varanasi. He graduated in Geology & post graduation in Geophysics from Banaras Hindu University, then pursued doctoral work in Groundwater Geophysics jointly from Banaras Hindu University & National Geophysical Research Institute, Hyderabad. He topped his class in geology as well as post graduation in geophysics, and was awarded the BHU Cash Prize and Master N.L. Sharma Memorial Gold Medal for standing first in Geology.

== Career ==
Chandra started his career with National Geophysical Research Institute, Hyderabad as a Research Fellow in 1973, joining the Central Ground Water Board, Ministry of Water Resources (India) as a geophysicist in 1978. He later became Regional Director in the same organization. Currently he is associated with WAPCOS as an advisor and with 'The World Bank' as a consultant.

His work includes source finding in drought prone areas, deep productive fracture zone aquifers in hard rocks, fresh/saline groundwater interface and aquifers in coastal tracts and cyclone inundated areas, aquifers in saturated cavities of limestone, safe aquifer delineation and well designing in contaminated areas.
