= Vinod Kumar Gaur =

Indian seismologist (born 1936)

- Born: 11 July 1936 (age 90); Azamgarh, Uttar Pradesh, India
- Education: Banaras Hindu University Varanasi; Imperial College, London; London University; Paris-Sorbonne University
- Known for: Studies on the tectonics of the Himalayas
- Awards: 1971 IITR Khosla Research Award; 1979 Shanti Swarup Bhatnagar Prize; 1979 IGU Krishnan Medal; 1996 MoM Award of Excellence; 2000 AGU Edward A. Flinn III Award; 2006 ISC Meghnad Saha Birth Centenary Medal; 2007 INSA D. N. Wadia Medal
- Scientific career
- Fields: Seismology
- Workplaces: National Physical Laboratory Indian Institute of Technology Roorkee; National Geophysical Research Institute; Indian Institute of Astrophysics; CSIR Fourth Paradigm Institute

Vinod Kumar Gaur (born 1936) is an Indian seismologist, a former director of the National Geophysical Research Institute and an honorary emeritus scientist at CSIR Fourth Paradigm Institute, known for his prediction of the April 2015 Nepal earthquake. He is reported to have conducted extensive studies on the tectonics of the Himalayas and is an elected fellow of the National Academy of Sciences, India, The World Academy of Sciences, Indian Academy of Sciences and the Indian National Science Academy. The Council of Scientific and Industrial Research, the apex agency of the Government of India for scientific research, awarded him the Shanti Swarup Bhatnagar Prize for Science and Technology, one of the highest Indian science awards for his contributions to Earth, Atmosphere, Ocean and Planetary Sciences in 1979.

== Biography ==
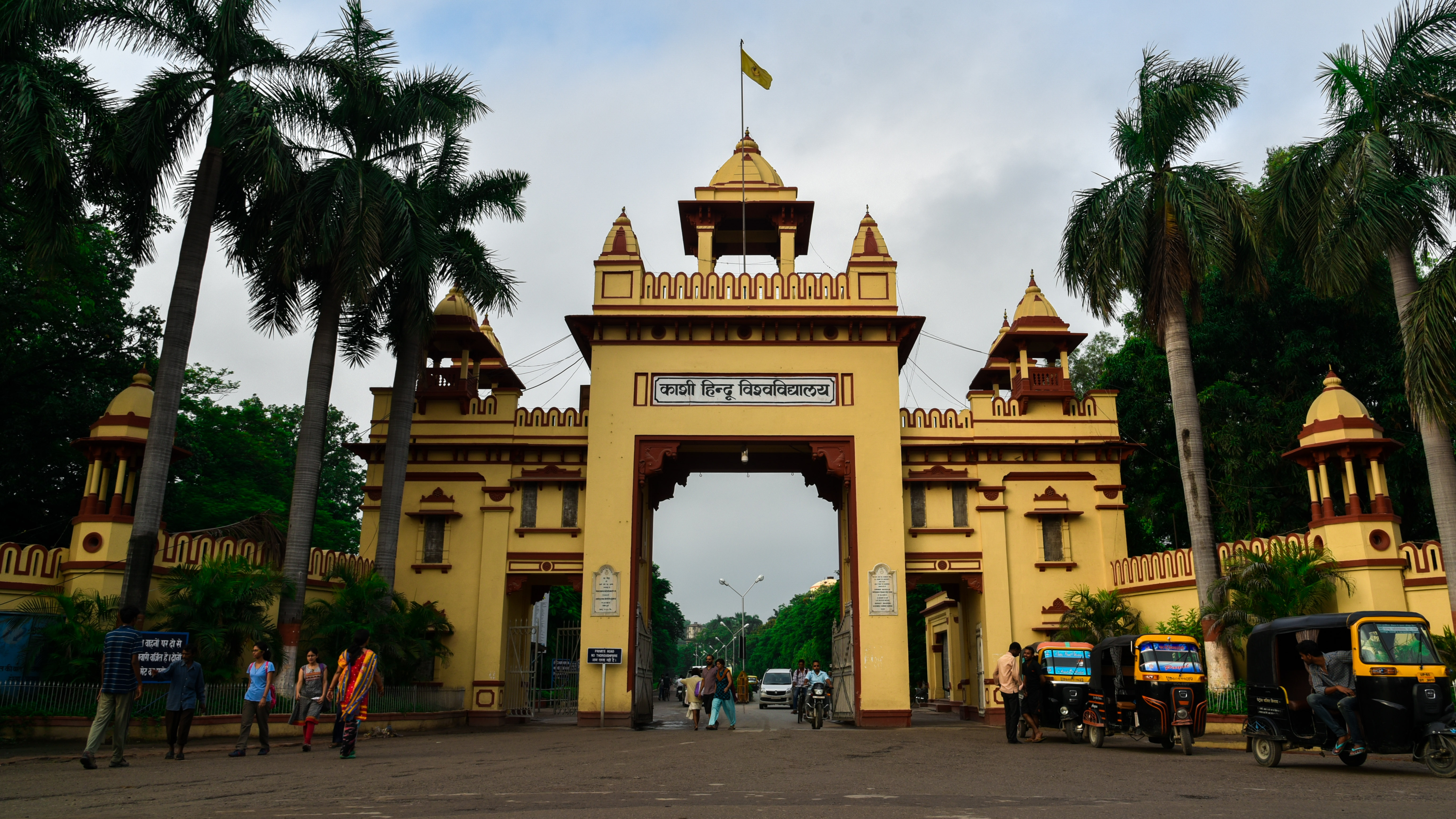
Banaras Hindu University

V. K. Gaur, born on 11 July 1936 in Varanasi, a temple town in the Indian state of Uttar Pradesh, completed his master's degree at Banaras Hindu University with gold medal in 1955 and proceeded to the UK for his doctoral studies at Imperial College, London. After securing a PhD from the University of London in 1959, he did his post-doctoral work at Paris-Sorbonne University and started his career by joining National Physical Laboratory (United Kingdom) as a scientific officer in 1960. A year later, he returned to India and joined University of Roorkee (present-day Indian Institute of Technology, Roorkee) as a reader where he spent 21 years, serving as a professor and the dean of research from 1978 till he moved to National Geophysical Research Institute as the director in 1983. After a service of 6 years, the Government of India appointed him as the secretary to the Department of Ocean Development of the Ministry of Earth Sciences, a post he held till 1992 when he joined CSIR Forth Paradigm (then known as CSIR Centre for Mathematical Modelling and Computer Simulation-CMMACS) as a Distinguished Professor. He served CMMACS till his superannuation in 1996, but continues to be associated with the institute as a CSIR Honorary Scientist. He also holds the position of a Distinguished Professor at the Indian Institute of Astrophysics. In between, he held the directorship of Deccan Gold Mines from 2006 to 2011.

== Legacy ==
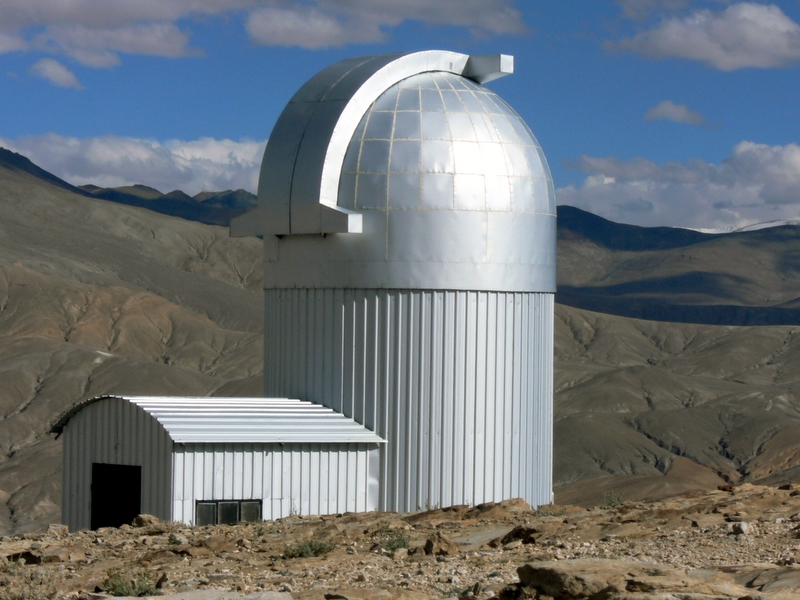
Indian Astronomical Observatory

One of the first contributions of Gaur to the science of geology came during his doctoral studies at Imperial College when he discovered the host rock effect in geo-electromagnetics, which had been unsuspected till then and this discovery assisted him in earning his PhD. His later studies covered the fields of geodesy, seismology and electromagnetics and his studies on the tectonics of Himalayas assisted in estimating the plate under-thrusts and understanding the micro-earthquakes in the region. He is credited with the discovery of the thick Deccan lithosphere which he accomplished using the seismic tomography experiments for the first time in India. He is reported to be the first scientist to use Global Positioning System Geodesy to measure the Indian plate velocity quantitatively in comparison to the Eurasian plate velocity and as well as the first to conduct an experiment to constrain global carbon fluxes in India and Central Asia through inversion of ultra-high precision atmospheric concentration data. His studies have been documented as several peer-reviewed articles, (Note: Please see Selected bibliography section) the article repository of the Indian Academy of Sciences has listed 61 of them. On the infrastructure development front, his contributions are reported in the implementation of Marine Satellite and Ocean Information Services and in the establishment of a CO_{2} laboratory at Indian Astronomical Observatory, Hanle. It was during his tenure as the professor, academic programs on signal analysis, inverse theory and computational geophysics were introduced at the University of Roorkee and the University Grants Commission of India subsequently extended the courses designed by him to other universities. His involvement is also known in the preparation of science texts for higher secondary studies of the Central Board of Secondary Education. He was one of the propagators of the Science to People programs and also sat in the councils of the Indian National Science Academy (1985–87 and 1994–96) and the Indian Academy of (Sciences 1992–97).

== Awards and honors ==
Gaur, a recipient of doctorates (honoris causa) from Jawaharlal Nehru Technological University, Hyderabad, Andhra University and Banaras Hindu University, received the Khosla Research Award of the Indian Institute of Technology, Roorkee in 1971. The Council of Scientific and Industrial Research awarded him the Shanti Swarup Bhatnagar Prize, one of the highest Indian science awards, in 1979. The Krishnan Medal of the Indian Geophysical Union reached him in 1996, followed by the Award of Excellence of the Ministry of Mines in 1996 and the Edward A. Flinn III Award of the American Geophysical Union in 2000. He is also a recipient of the Saha Birth Centenary Award of the Indian Science Congress Association and the D. N. Wadia Medal and the award orations he has delivered include the Guru Prasad Chatterjee Memorial Lecture of the Indian National Science Academy. The Indian National Science Academy also elected him as a fellow in 1980 and the Indian Academy of Sciences followed suit five years later. He became an elected fellow of the National Academy of Sciences, India in 1988 and The World Academy of Sciences in 2000. He is also a fellow of the Indian Geophysical Union and Andhra Pradesh Academy of Sciences.

== Selected bibliography ==
- Gaur, Vinod K.; Priestley, Keith F. (1997). "Shear wave velocity structure beneath the Archaean granites around Hyderabad, inferred from receiver function analysis". Proceedings of the Indian Academy of Sciences - Earth and Planetary Sciences. 106 (1–2): 1–8. doi:10.1007/BF02841745. S2CID 128835891.
- Gaur, V. K. (1999). "Inverse modelling for parameter estimation and experiment design". Sādhanā. 24 (1–2): 73–96. doi:10.1007/BF02747553. S2CID 120826773.
- Bilham, Roger; Gaur, Vinod K.; Molnar, Peter (2001). "a". Science. 293 (5534): 1442–1444. doi:10.1126/science.1062584. PMID 11520972. S2CID 129481998.
- Jade, Sridevi; Bhatt, B. C.; Yang, Z.; Bendick, R.; Gaur, V. K.; Molnar, P.; Anand, M. B.; Kumar, Dilip (2004). "GPS measurements from the ladakh himalaya, India: preliminary tests of plate-like or continuous deformation in tibet". Geological Society of America Bulletin. 116 (11–12): 1385–1391. Bibcode:2004GSAB..116.1385J. doi:10.1130/B25357.1.
- Niwas, Sri; Gupta, P. K.; Gaur, V. K. (2005). "Normalized impedance function and the straightforward inversion scheme for magnetotelluric data". Journal of Earth System Science. 114 (5): 523–531. Bibcode:2005JESS..114..523N. doi:10.1007/BF02702028.

== See also ==
- April 2015 Nepal earthquake
