= Krishnan Medal =

Indian geology award

The Krishnan Medal is an Indian geology award given annually by the Indian Geophysical Union. The award is named after M. S. Krishnan, an eminent geologist.

== Overview ==
The Indian Geophysical Union instituted the Krishnan Medal to be awarded each year to an outstanding geophysicist/geologist whose age does not exceed 40 years (on 1 January of the year) for outstanding work in specific branches of geophysics/geology and related geosciences.

== Nomination ==
Nominations each year are called from the members of the Executive Council, past recipients of the medal and past Presidents for the award of the Krishnan Medal and constitute an Expert Committee to make the selection for each year. The medallist is presented with the award at the next annual meeting. Since 1993 a Gold Medal has been awarded to the recipient.

Nominations, along with the bio-data, accompanied by 4 copies of the reprints of 3 important publications of the candidates should be sent to the Secretary, Indian Geophysical Union, by 31 July, of the year.

== Recipients ==
- 1964 Manik Talwani
- 1965 Devendra Lal
- 1966 H. M. Iyer
- 1967 S. Balakrishna
- 1968 A. Jayaraman
- 1969 Supriya Roy
- 1970 C. Radhakrishna Murthy
- 1971 D. N. Avasthi
- 1972 D. Gupta Sarma
- 1973 K. V. Raghava Rao
- 1974 J. G. Negi
- 1975 R. K. Verma
- 1976 K. L. Kaila
- 1977 M. B. Ramachandran Nair
- 1978 H. K. Gupta
- 1979 V. K. Gaur
- 1980 S. K. Verma
- 1981 S. Krishnaswamy
- 1982 K. Gopalan
- 1983 I. V. Radhakrishna Murthy
- 1984 B. H. Briz Kishore
- 1985 S. K. Tandon
- 1986 No award
- 1987 R .K. Tiwari
- 1988 A. K. Singhvi
- 1989 S. Dasgupta
- 1990 No award
- 1991 S. S. Rai
- 1992 No award
- 1993 Kusala Rajendran
- 1994 Rajiv Nigam
- 1995 Anil Kumar
- 1996 Kolluru Sree Krishna, K. Sain
- 1997 P. Divakar Naidu
- 1998 Ranadhir Mukhopadhyay
- 1999 A. K. Chaubey
- 2000 M.Radhakrishna and Y.V.B.Sarma
- 2001 P. Sengupta
- 2002 B. S. Daya Sagar
- 2003 No award
- 2004 U. Kulshrestha and Ajay Manglik
- 2005 V. Chakravarthi
- 2006 Vineet K. Gahalaut and Niloy Khare
- 2007 Chalapathi Rao, Laxmidhar Behera
- 2008 Virendra Mani Tiwari, Abhayaram Bansal
- 2009 Jyotiranjan Srichandan Ray
- 2010 Prakash Kumar and Hetu C. Sheth
- 2011 Pradeep Srivatsava and B. Prasanta Kumar Patro
- 2012 M. Ram Mohan and Rajesh Agnihotri
- 2013 Saumen Maiti and Senthil Kumar
- 2014 Pawan Dewangan
- 2015 Parthasarathi Chakraborty; M. S. Girish Kumar
- 2016 Uma Shankar
- 2017 Nimisha Vedanti and Develeena Mani

== See also ==
- List of geology awards
- List of geophysics awards
- List of earth sciences awards
