= Krishan Lal Kaila =

Indian geophysicist and seismologist

- Born: 7 September 1932; Lahore, British India
- Died: 2003 (aged 71); New Delhi, India
- Known for: Studies on deep seismic soundings
- Scientific career
- Fields: Seismology; Geophysics

Krishan Lal Kaila (7 September 1932 – 2003) was an Indian geophysicist and seismologist. Born to a Punjabi khatri family in Lahore of the British India (presently in Pakistan) on 7 September 1932, he was known for his studies on deep seismic soundings (DSS) and was one of the pioneers of the DSS technique in India. His studies covered the tectonic regions of Kadapa, Dharwar Craton, Deccan Traps, and the sedimentary basins of Gujarat and the Himalayas and added to the understanding of the geophysics of the region. His researches have been documented as several peer-reviewed articles; (Note: Please see Selected bibliography section) ResearchGate, an online article repository has listed 117 of them. Several authors have cited his works in their work.

== Awards ==
He received the Krishnan Medal and the Decennial Award of the Indian Geophysical Union in 1976 and 1994 respectively. The Council of Scientific and Industrial Research, the apex agency of the Government of India for scientific research, awarded him the Shanti Swarup Bhatnagar Prize for Science and Technology, one of the highest Indian science awards for his contributions to Earth, Atmosphere, Ocean and Planetary Sciences in 1977. He died in New Delhi in 2003, at the age of 71.

== Selected bibliography ==
- K. L. Kaila, Madhava Rao (December 1975). "Seismotectonic maps of the European area". Bulletin of the Seismological Society of America. 65 (6): 1721–1732. Bibcode:1975BuSSA..65.1721K. doi:10.1785/BSSA0650061721. S2CID 129043045.
- K. L. Kaila, Dipankar Sarkar (1982). "Earthquake intensity attenuation pattern in the United States". Geophys. J. Int. 70 (1): 31–39. Bibcode:1982GeoJ...70...31K. doi:10.1111/j.1365-246X.1982.tb06389.x.
- K. L. Kaila; K. M. Tripathi; M. M. Dixit (November 1984). "Crustal Structure Along Wular Lake-Gulmarg-Naoshera Profile Across Pir Panjal Range of the Himalayas From Deep Seismic Soundings". Journal of the Geological Society of India. 25 (11).
- V. G. Krishna, K.L. Kaila (1986). "Digitization program of analog DSS records and their reinterpretation". International Symposium on Deep Seismic Sounding Traverses. doi:10.13140/RG.2.1.2912.6809.
- K. L. Kaila, Kalachand Sain (April 1997). "Variation of Crustal Velocity Structure in India as Determined from DSS Studies and their Implications on Regional Tectonics". Journal of the Geological Society of India. 49 (4).
