= Prashant Goswami =

Indian computational geoscientist and climatologist

- Born: 1 January 1959 (age 67); Assam, India
- Education: Guwahati University; Indian Institute of Science
- Known for: Studies on the tropical atmospheric variability
- Awards: 2001 S. S. Bhatnagar Prize
- Scientific career
- Fields: Climatology; Atmospheric modeling
- Workplaces: IIT Kanpur; Fourth Paradigm Institute; Academy of Scientific and Innovative Research; École Normale Supérieure; NISTADS

Prashant Goswami (born 1959) is an Indian computational geoscientist, climatologist and the director of the National Institute of Science, Technology and Development Studies, New Delhi. He is a former scientist at the Fourth Paradigm Institute (formerly CSIR Centre for Mathematical Modelling and Computer Simulation) and is known for his studies on the tropical atmospheric variability across the time scales. The Council of Scientific and Industrial Research, the apex agency of the Government of India for scientific research, awarded him the Shanti Swarup Bhatnagar Prize for Science and Technology, one of the highest Indian science awards for his contributions to Earth, Atmosphere, Ocean and Planetary Sciences in 2001. (Note: Long link - please select award year to see details)

== Biography ==
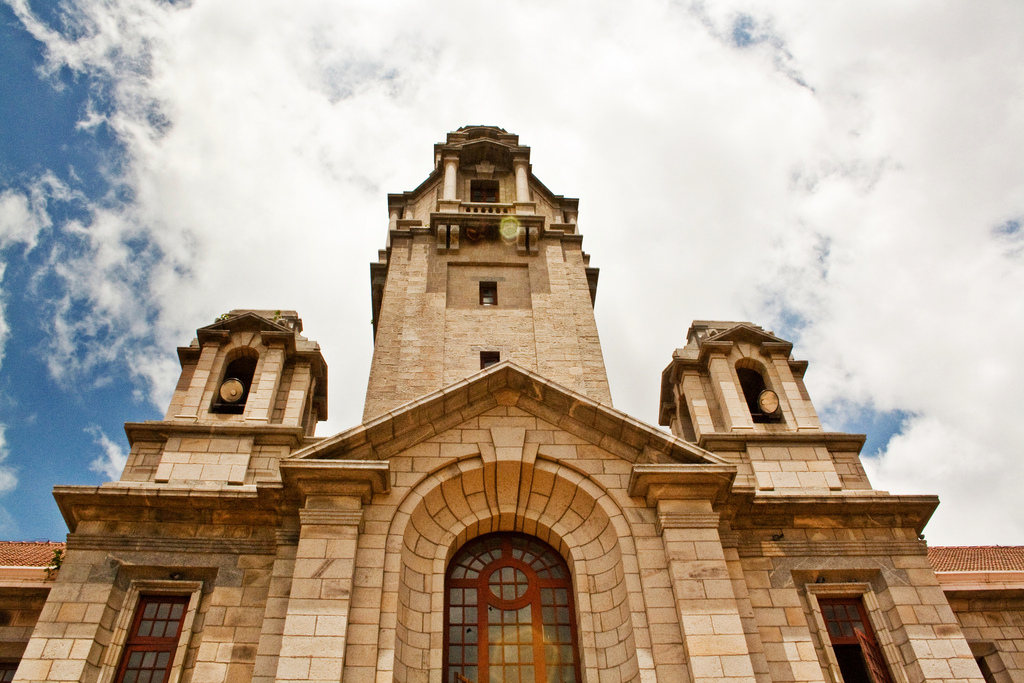
Indian Institute of Science

Prashant Goswami, born on the New Year's Day of 1959 in the Northeast Indian state of Assam, did his master's degree in physics at Guwahati University and secured a PhD from the Indian Institute of Science in 1982; his doctoral thesis was in mathematical and theoretical physics. After completing his post-doctoral studies at IISc, he joined the Indian Institute of Technology, Kanpur as a visiting professor and in 1993, he moved to the CSIR Centre for Mathematical Modelling and Computer Simulation (C-MMACS) (presently known as Fourth Paradigm Institute) as a scientist where he became the head of the Climate and Environmental Modelling Programme. He served the institute for over 22 years till his move to the National Institute of Science, Technology and Development Studies (NISTADS) as its director in November 2015. In between, he also served as a visiting professor at École Normale Supérieure during 2001–03 and as the dean of the Mathematical and Information Science at the Academy of Scientific and Innovative Research.

Goswami is known to have pioneered long-range, high-resolution dynamical forecasting of monsoon in India for which he developed innovative methodologies, algorithms, models and applications. His team is reported to have studies Cyclone Neelam that affected the southern parts of India in October 2012 which he has detailed in an article published in 2013. His studies have been documented in several peer-reviewed articles; ResearchGate, an online repository of scientific articles, has listed 131 of them. He contributed to the Climate Change 2013: The Physical Science Basis: Working Group I Contribution to the Fifth Assessment Report of the Intergovernmental Panel on Climate Change and was one of the lead authors of the Chapter 14, Climate Phenomena and their Relevance for Future Regional Climate Change. He was a member of the Steering and Program Organizing Committee of the International Conference Energy & Meteorology (ICEM) 2015 and retains his place in the committee for the 2017 conference. The Council of Scientific and Industrial Research awarded him the Shanti Swarup Bhatnagar Prize, one of the highest Indian science awards in 2001.

== Selected bibliography ==
- Prashant Goswami, Upadhayula Suryanarayana Murty, Srinivasa Rao Mutheneni, Avinash Kukkuthady, Swathi Trithala Krishnan (27 November 2012). "A Model of Malaria Epidemiology Involving Weather, Exposure and Transmission Applied to North East India". PLOS ONE. 7 (11) e49713. Bibcode:2012PLoSO...749713G. doi:10.1371/journal.pone.0049713. PMC 3507888. PMID 23209594.
- Jurismita Baruah, Prashant Goswami (10 April 2015). "Dynamical model of daily CO concentration over Delhi: assessment of forecast potential". Current Science. 108 (7): 1369–1374.
- Munnu Singh, Neha Guleria, Eranki Prakasa Rao, Prashant Goswami (2014). "Efficient C sequestration and benefits of medicinal vetiver cropping in tropical regions". Agronomy for Sustainable Development. 34 (3): 603–607. doi:10.1007/s13593-013-0184-3. S2CID 17766882.
- Krushna Chandra Gouda, Nagaraj Bhat, Prashant Goswami (2013). "Wind Analysis of Cyclone "Neelam" using Remote Sensing and Reanalysis Data". Proceedings of the Eighth Asia-Pacific Conference on Wind Engineering. pp. 1101–1108. doi:10.3850/978-981-07-8012-8_230. ISBN 978-981-07-8011-1.
- Prashant Goswami, Himesh Shivappa, Santhaveeranna Goud (June 2012). "Comparative analysis of the role of domain size, horizontal resolution and initial conditions in the simulation of tropical heavy rainfall events". Meteorological Applications. 19 (2): 170–178. Bibcode:2012MeApp..19..170G. doi:10.1002/met.253.
- Prashant Goswami and Swapan Mallick (February 2011). "Objective Bias Correction for Improved Skill in Forecasting Diurnal Cycles of Temperature over Multiple Locations: The Summer Case". Weather and Forecasting. 26 (1): 26–43. Bibcode:2011WtFor..26...26G. doi:10.1175/2010WAF2222407.1.
- Prashant Goswami, Swapan Mallick and K. C. Gouda (August 2011). "Objective Debiasing for Improved Forecasting of Tropical Cyclone Intensity with a Global Circulation Model". Monthly Weather Review. 139 (8): 2471–2487. Bibcode:2011MWRv..139.2471G. doi:10.1175/2011MWR3600.1.

== See also ==
- Kolluru Sree Krishna
