= Manik Talwani =

Indian-American geophysicist

Manik Talwani (August 22, 1933 – March 22, 2023) was an Indian-American geophysicist.

He was born in Patiala. Following his master of science degree in physics at the University of Delhi in 1953, he briefly worked in Norway before moving to the United States. He was a research fellow at the Lamont–Doherty Earth Observatory under Maurice Ewing, taking his PhD in 1959 and continuing at the institution, where he became director from 1973 to 1981.

From 1981 he was chief scientist and director of the Center for Marine Coastal Studies at Gulf Oil. As Gulf was merged with Chevron, Talwani became Schlumberger Professor of geophysics at Rice University. He was also a director at the Houston Advanced Research Center and president and CEO of the Integrated Ocean Drilling Program.

Talwani received the Krishnan Medal in 1964, the James B. Macelwane Medal in 1967, a NASA Exceptional Scientific Achievement Award in 1973, the Maurice Ewing Medal in 1981 and 2015 (as the first person to receive it twice), the George P. Woollard Award in 1983, the Alfred Wegener Medal in 1993 and the Wiechert Medal of Honor in 2009.

He was a Guggenheim Fellow, received an honorary degree from the University of Oslo in 1981 and was a fellow of the Norwegian Academy of Science and Letters from 1987 as well as the Russian Academy of Natural Sciences.

He died in March 2023 in Auburndale, Massachusetts.
