= Devendra Lal =

Indian geophysicist (1929–2012)

- Born: 14 February 1929; Varanasi, India
- Died: 1 December 2012 (aged 83); La Jolla, California, United States
- Education: Banares Hindu University; TIFR
- Spouse: Aruna Lal (née Damany)
- Awards: Shanti Swarup Bhatnagar Prize for Science and Technology, 1967; Krishnan Medal, Indian Geophysical Union, 1965; Fellow, Indian National Science Academy, 1972; Fellow, FRS, 1979; Fellow, Meteoritical Society, 1970; Foreign Associate, National Academy of Sciences, 1975; V.M. Goldschmidt Medal, Geochemical Society, 1997; Padma Shri, 1971
- Scientific career
- Fields: Geophysics
- Workplaces: TIFR; Director, Physical Research Laboratory; Scripps Institution of Oceanography
- Thesis: (1960)
- Academic advisors: Bernard Peters

Devendra Lal FRS (14 February 1929 – 1 December 2012) was an Indian geophysicist.

== Life ==
He was born in Varanasi, India. He graduated from Banaras Hindu University. He graduated from Bombay University; his thesis was on cosmic ray physics; his thesis adviser was Bernard Peters.

He was Director, of the Physical Research Laboratory, Ahmedabad from 1972 to 1983.

He was Visiting Professor at Scripps Institution of Oceanography, University of California, San Diego, from 1989 to 2012. Devendra Lal was President of the International Union of Geodesy and Geophysics (IUGG) from 1983 to 1987. He was also elected Fellow of the Royal Society in 1979.
