= National Centre for Earth Science Studies =

Indian research institute

- Motto: Vasudhaiva Kutumbakam
- Established: 1978; 48 years ago
- Research type: Autonomous Research Institute
- Budget: ₹17.60 crore (US$1.8 million) (2025–26)
- Field of research: Solid-earth science
- Director: N. V. Chalapathi Rao
- Chairman: M. Ravichandran
- Location: Thiruvananthapuram, Kerala, India
- Campus: Urban; 18.6 acres (7.5 ha)
- Operating agency: Ministry of Earth Sciences, Government of India
- Website: www.ncess.gov.in

The National Centre for Earth Science Studies (NCESS) (Malayalam: ദേശിയ ഭൗമ ശാസ്ത്ര പഠന കേന്ദ്രം) is an autonomous research centre to promote scientific and technological research and development studies in the earth sciences. NCESS pursues problems related to land, sea and atmosphere. It was instituted by the government of Kerala in 1978, at Thiruvananthapuram, Kerala. CESS was the earliest institute in the country to embrace the concept of Earth System Science (ESS). CESS contributions over the years have enhanced knowledge of the geological evolution of south India, the complexity of coastal processes and natural hazards, as well as in proposing mitigatory measures to deal with natural hazards.

CESS carries out studies in river basin evaluation, ground water management, coastal erosion, and other special problems. CESS does research in earth system, micro-level watershed planning, natural hazards management, chemical analysis, CRZ mapping, and studies of air, water, land, noise pollution, etc.

CESS also does environmental impact assessment, coastal and estuarine management, terrain analysis, natural resources management, laser applications, river sand mining, and microlevel planning. CESS conducts research courses leading to doctoral degree.

Recognizing the growth potential of CESS, resource constraints of the State Government and the role CESS can play in national development, the government of Kerala proposed the taking over of the institute by the Ministry of Earth Sciences, Government of India. An expert committee made an assessment of the scientific programs pursued by the institute and deliberated on a long-term vision for the institute as a national centre. The committee recommended the taking over of CESS by the MoES and according it the status of an autonomous institute under the Earth System Science Organization (ESSO) of MoES. The proposed thrust areas of research will be crustal evolution and geodynamics, sedimentology and depositional processes, coastal dynamics and cloud microphysics.

The total estimated budget requirements of CESS will be Rs.128.67 crore for the balance period of the 12th FYP.

== Campus ==
The Centre for Earth Science Studies is housed in a 50,000 sq. ft building constructed in a campus of 19 acres. The development of the CESS campus in 1986 saw the transformation of an abandoned clay mining site to a beautiful green campus within one year. The campus was the vision of the founder Director Prof. C. Karunakaran, realised through the leadership of Dr. H. K. Gupta, the then director and Sri M. Sethumadhavan, the then registrar, and Dr S. Satheeschandran Nair.

The CESS building is constructed on natural gradients, slopes and excavated mining areas in a nature friendly architectural design. Buildings are spread as different blocks. Main building houses Administration, Library, Conference Hall and an auditorium. Four interconnected blocks provide seating spaces for scientists. Laboratory block houses main laboratories of all divisions with a centralised access to scientists of all disciplines. A separate building for canteen and guest house is built away from the main buzz of activity.

The canteen functions from 9 am to 4:30 pm providing Kerala style breakfast and lunch with snacks and tea and coffee. In 2004 a laboratory block was added over the existing block to house new facilities and provide two smaller meeting and discussion halls.

== Research Groups ==
- Solid Earth Research Group (SERG)
- Environmental Hydrology Group (EHG)
- Marine Science Group (MSG)
- Atmospheric Science Group (ASG)

== Facilities ==
- X-Ray Fluorescence Spectrometer
- X-Ray diffractometer (XRD)
- Petrology and crustal evolution studies
- X-Ray Fluorescence (XRF)
- Electron Probe Microanalysis (EPMA)
- Laser Ablation Inductively Coupled Plasma Mass Spectrometry (LA-ICPMS)
- Multicollector Inductively Coupled Plasma Mass Spectrometry (MC-ICPMS)
- SEM-EDS Laboratory
- Isotope Ratio Mass Spectrometry (IRMS)
- Critical Zone Observatories (CZOs)
- NCESS Seismological Observatory Antarctica
- Seismology
- Palaeomagnetism Laboratory
- Raman spectrometer coupled to microscope
- Thin Section Laboratory
- Sedimentology Laboratory
- Placer laboratory
- Gas chromatograph
- Photo interpretation
- Geoinformatics Laboratory
- High Altitude Cloud Physics Observatory at Munnar
- Mid Altitude Observatory at Braemore
- Lightning Detection Network
- Particle Size Analyser
- Library
