= Wadia Institute of Himalayan Geology =

Research institution in Dehradun, India

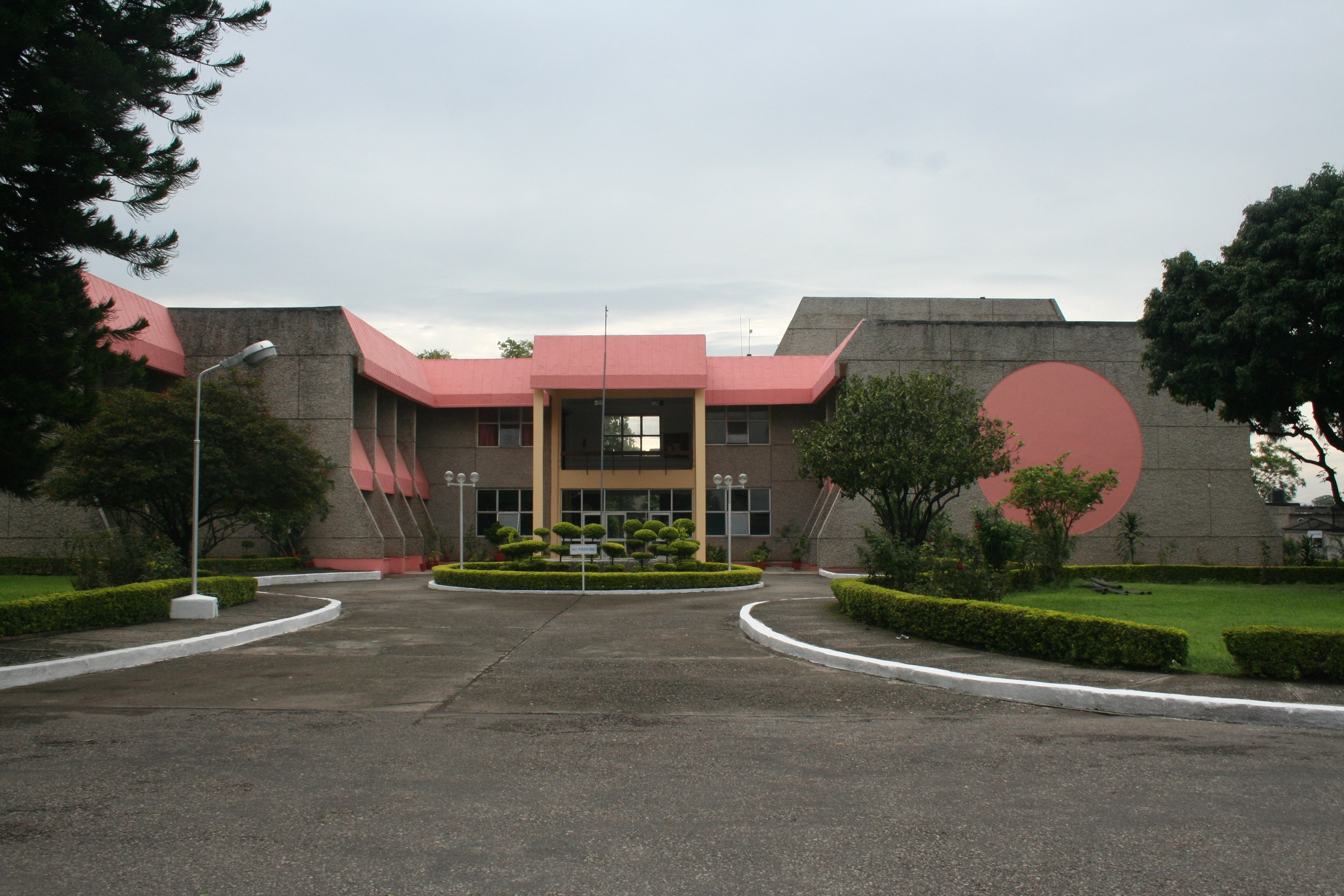
- Main Building (Entrance)
- Former name: Institute of Himalayan Geology
- Type: Natural Resources Research Institute
- Established: 1968
- Director: Prof M. Ram Mohan
- Location: Dehradun, Uttarakhand, India; 30°19′42″N 78°00′47″E
- Campus: Urban
- Website: www.wihg.res.in

Wadia Institute of Himalayan Geology, Dehradun is an autonomous Natural Resources research institute for the study of Geology of the Himalaya under the Department of Science and Technology, Ministry of Science and Technology, Government of India. It was established in June 1968 in the Botany Department, Delhi University, the Institute was shifted to Dehradun, Uttarakhand during April 1976. The institute also has three field search stations, at Naddi-Dharamshala, Dokriani Bamak Glacier Station and at Itanagar in Arunachal Pradesh.

== History ==
The institute has its origins in department of Geology at University of Delhi, after being shifted to Dehradun it was initially named as the Institute of Himalayan Geology, renamed in 1976 as the Wadia Institute of Himalayan Geology in memory of its founder, late Prof. Darashaw Nosherwan Wadia (F.R.S. and National Professor), in honor to his contributions to the geology of the Himalayas. During the last quarter century the Institute has grown as a center of excellence in the field Himalayan Geology and is recognise as a National Laboratory of international repute with advanced laboratories and other infrastructural facilities for undertaking higher level of research in the country. The institute is involved in both basic and applied research to unravel the Geodynamics of the mighty Himalaya, which covers a wide spectrum of Geoscientific disciplines: petrology, geochemistry, structural geology, geophysics, sedimentology, biostratigraphy, earthquake geology, geomorphology, environment & engineering geology, quaternary geology, hydrology, glaciology, etc.

== S. P. Nautiyal Museum ==
S. P. Nautiyal Museum is housed in the Wadia Institute of Himalayan Geology in Dehradun. The museum offers a glimpse of the mighty Himalaya; its origin, evolution in time and space, natural resources, life in the geological past, earthquakes and environmental aspects. Basic objective in organizing the museum is to educate students and general public as well as to highlight the Institute activities. The museum is very popular among children and tourists and is a center of attraction of large number of student visitors from different universities, local schools general public as well as international visitors. Students in large groups from different schools, universities, colleges and from other institutions visited the Museum and guided tours were provided to them. A relief model of the Himalaya and paintings depicting the impact of human activities on the environment displayed in the Museum remained a point of attraction for the visitors. Also, over the years visitors from US, Austria, U.K, Ukraine, Thailand, Australia, England, Japan, Nepal, France, Russia, Moscow, Israel and Canada visited the Museum.

== Center for Glaciology ==
The Centre for Himalayan Glaciology was inaugurated by the Hon'ble Minister for Science and Technology and Earth Sciences, Shri Prithviraj Chavan on 4 July 2009 in the benign presence of the Secretary, DST, Dr. T. Ramasami and Joint Secretary, Shri Sanjiv Nair. The primary mission of the Centre is to "Mount a coordinated research initiative on Himalayan glaciology to understand the factors controlling the effects of climate on glaciers in order to develop strategies for climate change adaptability for sustained growth of society". In addition, the Centre shall take up programmes of capacity building in this very specialized field, which will eventually nurture the independent Indian Institute of Glaciology. But, in August 2020 Government merged all the activities with Institute.

== Student Programmes/Fellowships ==
- Fellowships
  - Institute Fellowships:

The Institute provides two categories of Institute Fellowships every year: a) Junior Research Fellowship b) Institute Research Associate

- Project Fellowship

Project assistantships are advertised as and when vacancies in Institute projects or externally funded projects arise.

== Consultancy & Advisory Services ==
The Wadia Institute of Himalayan Geology provides consultancy and advisory services on small scale to various organisations for purpose of road alignment, site selection for bridges and their foundation, slope stability and control of landslides, site selection for deep tubewells, geotechnical feasibility of major and minor hydel projects and related structures, passenger and haulage ropeways, seismotectonics of hydel projects and environmental feasibility of developmental projects etc.

== See also ==
- Department of Science and Technology (India)
- Indian Institute of Technology Roorkee
- Indian Institute of Petroleum, Dehradun
