= Physical Research Laboratory =

Indian space research institute

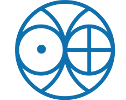
- Physical Research Laboratory, Ahmedabad
- Type: Research institution
- Established: 1947; 79 years ago
- Budget: ₹240.00 crore (US$25 million) (2025–26)
- Director: Anil Bhardwaj
- Location: Ahmedabad, Gujarat, India; 23°2′7.61″N 72°32′37.58″E
- Website: prl.res.in
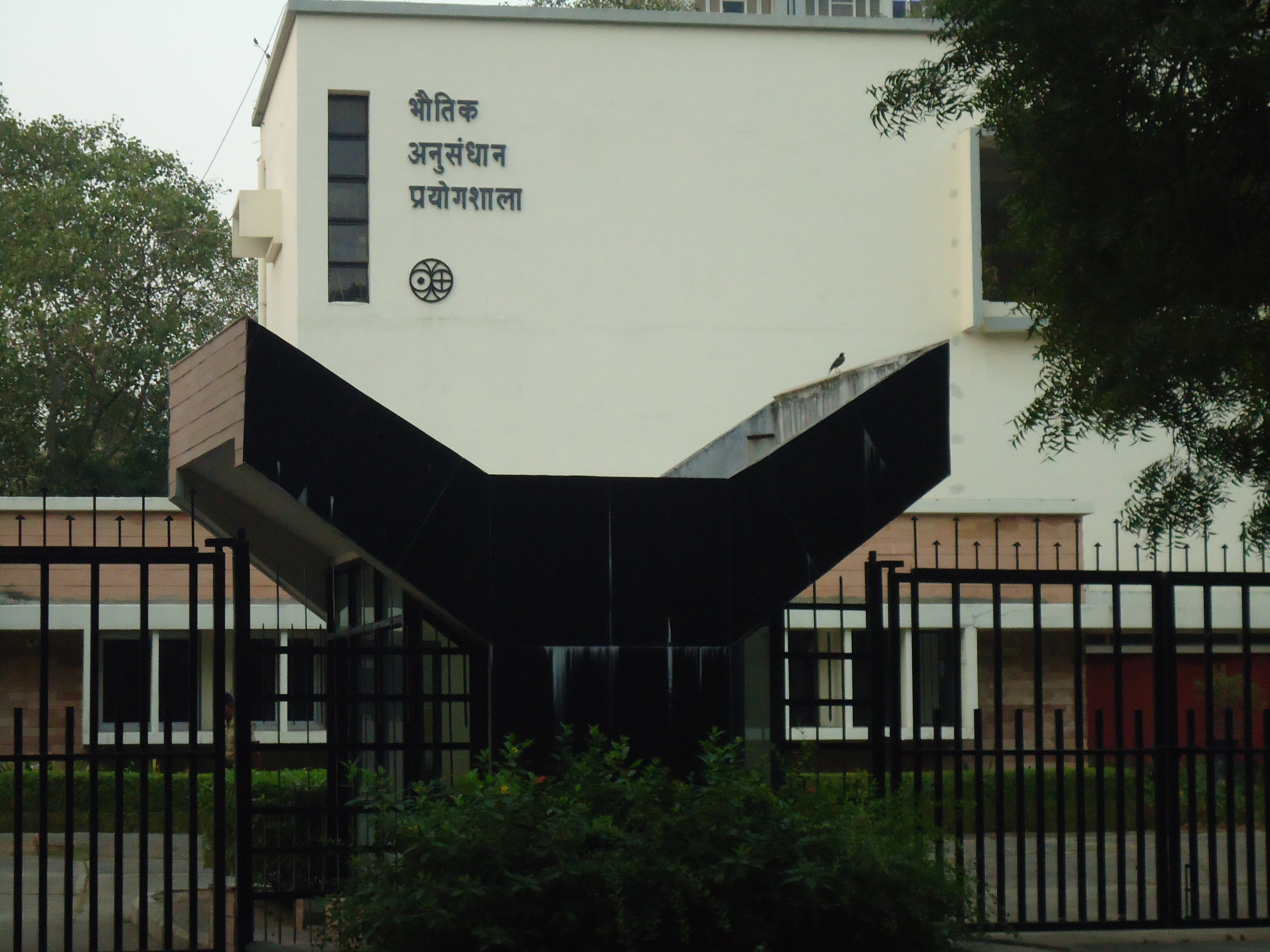

The Physical Research Laboratory (abbr. PRL; Hindi: भौतिक अनुसंधान प्रयोगशाला, IAST: Bhoutik Anusandhan Prayogashala) is a National Research Institute for space and allied sciences, supported mainly by the Department of Space, Government of India. This research laboratory has ongoing research programmes in astronomy and astrophysics, atmospheric sciences and aeronomy, planetary and geosciences, Earth sciences, Solar System studies and theoretical physics. It also manages the Udaipur Solar Observatory and Mount Abu InfraRed Observatory. The PRL is located in Ahmedabad.

The Physical Research Laboratory was founded on 11 November 1947 by Dr. Vikram Sarabhai. The laboratory had a modest beginning at his residence, with research on cosmic rays.

The institute was formally established at the M.G. Science Institute, Ahmedabad, with support from the Karmkshetra Educational Foundation and the Ahmedabad Education Society. Prof. K. R. Ramanathan was the first director of the institute. The initial focus was research on cosmic rays and the properties of the upper atmosphere. Research areas were expanded to include theoretical physics and radio physics later with grants from the United States Atomic Energy Commission.

PRL is involved in research, related to five major fields of science. PRL is also instrumental in the PLANEX planetary science and exploration programme.

In June 2018, PRL scientists discovered exoplanet EPIC 211945201b or K2-236b, located 600 light years away from the Earth.

The building of the PRL was designed by Achyut Kanvinde in 1962.

In September 2026, PRL researchers published a landmark study in the journal Current Science mapping seasonal, daily and large-scale temperature variations across Mars' Hellas and Argyre impact basins using data from the Emirates Mars Mission's Hope spacecraft — revealing surface temperature swings of up to 145°C and providing new insights into how the Martian atmosphere circulates across its uneven terrain

== Organizational Structure ==
PRL council of Management is on the top of the hierarchy of the organizational structure of PRL. The director of PRL works under it. The director is consulted by various scientific divisions, the dean, and the registrar to work consistently. PRL has the following scientific divisions: Astronomy & Astrophysics, Solar physics, Planetary sciences, Space & Atmospheric sciences, Geosciences, Theoretical physics, and Atomic, Molecular & Optical Physics. The dean of PRL offers several academic services. Administration, workshop, construction & maintenance, computational services, and library are managed by the registrar of PRL. The administration takes care of general administration, stores & purchases, accounts, medical cell, and Hindi cell.

== History ==
The Physical Research Laboratory was founded on 11 November 1947 by Dr. Vikram Sarabhai. The laboratory had a modest beginning at his residence, with research on cosmic rays.

The institute was formally established at the M.G. Science Institute, Ahmedabad, with support from the Karmakshetra Educational Foundation and the Ahmedabad Education Society. After retiring from the India Meteorological Department, Prof. Kalpathi Ramakrishna Ramanathan joined as the first director of the institute. The initial focus was research on cosmic rays and the properties of the upper atmosphere as the science behind very high energetic particles bombarding the Earth was not much known. The dream of the founders was to establish a leading institute at Ahmedabad for conducting fundamental research on cosmic rays and some other selected areas of Physics. Atmospheric physics being Prof. Ramanathan's primary research interest, the Department of Atmospheric Physics was added to extend the scope of research activities. In some M. G. Science Institute rooms, the laboratory was initiated with few research students and assistants.

The overall scientific programs expanded in the direction of a unified study of the various types of radiation imparted on the Earth, with the growth of the laboratory. The need to incorporate radiophysics, theoretical physics, and an electronics group into the then existing atmospheric physics and cosmic ray groups was strongly felt in the interest of adequate implementation of this type of program. For the financial support, the Atomic Energy Commission of the Government of India was requested, and the request was accepted in 1949. A Council of Management for PRL was framed in 1950 with support from several bodies such as erstwhile Government of Bombay, Ministry of Natural Resources and Scientific Research, Karmakshetra Educational Foundation, Ahmedabad Educational Society, and Atomic Energy Commission. The ozone observing station was set up at Mount Abu by Prof. Ramanathan in 1951. On the date of October 12, 1951, the first measurement of ozone was performed using Dobson ozone spectrophotometer.

As the number of activities and workers were increasing, Ahmedabad Education Society decided to provide land for a separate building. Ahmedabad Education Society and Karmakshetra Educational Foundation contributed money for the cost of the building. Nobel laureate Prof. C. V. Raman placed the foundation stone of the building on February 15, 1952, and the late Prime Minister Jawaharlal Nehru inaugurated the first building of the campus on April 10, 1954. In the years of 1957–58, the scientists of PRL were taking part in a variety of scientific programs related to Earth sciences. Due to this, a need for in-house development of radiation detectors and electronic instruments was felt. Thus, PRL started developing and implementing Meson Telescopes, Photometers, Geiger-Muller Counters, Ionosonde, Dobson Spectrometers, etc. For the observations of airglow during the nighttime, ozone concentration in the atmosphere, the intensity of cosmic rays, etc., a research station at Gulmarg in Kashmir was established in 1955 by PRL. As this station was giving fruitful results, it was decided to set up a complete High Altitude Research Laboratory at Gulmarg in 1963. In the 1960s, many of rocket payloads were being manufactured at PRL. So PRL started emerging as the center for developing payloads for rockets.

Research on lunar meteorites and rocks and Earth sciences was started as they were favorite subjects of Prof. Devendra Lal, who took charge of the position of director of PRL in 1972. Various novel branches of studies such as Astronomy and Plasma Physics were launched in the 1970s. The research on Plasma Physics had two significant goals. One was to provide theoretical and experimental support to the then present research at PRL on space and ionosphere. The other was to commence research on the plasma of high temperature, which was crucial for the development of fusion research. The second goal was shifted and emerged as an institute named Institute for Plasma Research (IPR), Gandhinagar. In the 1970s, a program on atomic and Molecular physics was added to the existing programs as atomic and molecular reactions are crucial in order to understand astrophysics and atmospheric science. During the same era, three radio telescopes were also developed at Rajkot, Surat, and Thaltej(Ahmedabad). They were established with an aim to measure the speed of solar wind via observing radio source scintillations at the same time with all telescopes.

== Research in Scientific Divisions ==
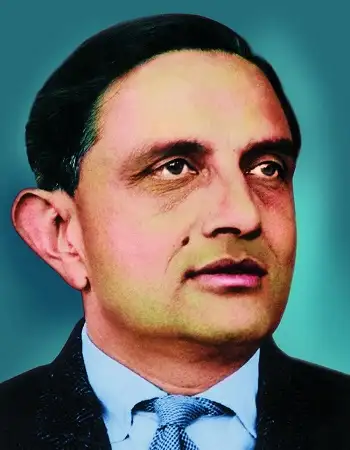
Dr. Vikram Sarabhai, the Laboratory's founder.

The research in various scientific divisions of PRL is as follows:

=== Astronomy and Astrophysics ===
This research program looks into optical, infrared, X ray, and radio wavelengths to study the problems concerned to galactic and extragalactic cosmic phenomena. The studies include the fields of star formation, evolution of intermediate mass stars, photometric and polarimetric studies of active galaxies and BL Lac objects and high angular resolution studies by lunar occultations, and the study on circumstellar structure. The astronomical observations are taken through a 1.2 m infrared telescope that is located in Mount Abu. The laboratory has also undertaken solar photospheric and chromospheric studies under the Global Oscillations Network Group project at Udaipur Solar Observatory. A 12 ft SPAR telescope is being used in this project. By utilizing radio techniques, the Solar Activity and its effect on space weather are also studied.

=== Atomic, Molecular and Optical Physics ===
This interdisciplinary research program works on a broad range of topics such as astrochemistry, foundations of quantum mechanics, luminescence dating, etc. It also studies classical and quantum properties of light, atoms, molecules, molecular clusters via broad range of electromagnetic spectrum, high energy electrons, etc. To cover the research activities in the area of quantum information science, the "Quantum Science and Technology Program" is started by this research group. The other research areas under this program are ion-momentum spectroscopy, quantum optics and quantum information, laser produced plasmas, non-linear optics and quantum entanglement, light scattering, etc. The available experimental facilities are diode-pumped solid state laser, femtosecond fiber laser, nikon inverted research microscope, spatial light modulators, single photon counting modules(SPCM), spin coating unit, FTIR spectrometer, etc.

=== Planetary Sciences ===
The division focuses on characterization of the processes which took place in the early Solar System. To do so, the program utilizes the applications of stable and radioactive isotopes. Main goal is to understand the origin and evolution of the Solar System with a special focus on inner planets. Another goal is to comprehend the physical and chemical processes of atmospheres of planets by simulations, observation, and modelling. Planetary Science and Exploration Program (PLANEX) is also run by this division. Some of the other research activities being conducted in this division are, but not limited to, solar X-ray and fluorescence emission from lunar surface, observations and modeling of trace gases, ions, and dust, in the lower atmosphere of Mars, reflectance spectroscopy of terrestrial and lunar samples, galactic chemical evolution, etc. Nobel gas mass spectrometer, electron probe micro analysis(EPMA), etc., are the experimental facilities available at this division.

=== Theoretical Physics ===
The theoretical physics division at PRL aims to study theoretical and phenomenological aspects of atomic physics, condensed matter physics, gravitation and astroparticle physics, non-equilibrium phenomena, and particle physics. Current research programs include neutrino physics, physics beyond standard model, standard and non-standard CP violation, Fermion masses, super-symmetry, baryogenesis, phenomenology of higher-dimensional theories, QCD and quark gluon plasma, colour superconductivity, chiral symmetry breaking, study of quantum chaos in nuclear energy levels, group theoretical models and nuclear structures, study of atomic Rydberg states, stark spectroscopy of atomic levels, stability analysis of synchronized structures in coupled map networks.

=== Space and Atmospheric Sciences ===
This goal of the division is to study radiative, chemical, ionization, and dynamical processes in the atmosphere of our planet by different methods such as in-situ rocket and balloon borne experiments, laboratory experiments, and theoretical simulation and modeling of the atmosphere of Earth. Wide research domains of this division are atmospheric chemistry; aerosol, radiation, and climate; and plasma and neutral interactions in near-Earth space. Measurement and modeling of trace gases and ozone are performed to investigate the dynamics and chemistry of the lower part of the atmosphere. Atmospheric aerosols are attempted to be characterized via different methods of observations and analysis. Some experimental facilities of this division include aerosol chemical speciation monitor(ACSM), surface trace gas analyzers, rocket and balloon borne sensors, near infrared imaging spectrograph(NIIS), Lidar, Greenhouse gas analyzers, etc.

=== Geosciences ===
Studies that are particularly related to geochronology, geochemistry, glaciology, oceanography and palaeoclimatology are carried out in this department. The major focus is on studying Earth and its components' origin and evolution. Isotope geology is one of the most researched subjects. Their research is based on measurements of abundances of radioactive isotopes, elements, etc. This division runs several research programs, particularly aerosol chemistry, hydrology, paleoclimatology, oceanography, etc. The experimental facilities of this division incorporate accelerator mass spectrometer(AMS), aethalometer, isotope ratio mass spectrometer(IRMS), ion chromatographs, and many more.

== Academics ==
The Physical Research Laboratory holds various seminars and public lectures. It has a workshop, computer centre, library and various other laboratories. It also offers a five-year doctoral programme in physics, with specialisations in theoretical physics and complex systems, outer space and atmospheric sciences, quantum optics and quantum information, astronomy and astrophysics (infrared, sub-mm and radio astronomy, Solar physics, planetary and geosciences). The admission is through a written test and interview.

== National awards ==
The research institution offers national awards to scientists who have made outstanding contributions in the field of science and technology. The awards presented are:

- Hari Om Ashram Prerit Senior Scientist Award
- Hari Om Ashram Prerit Vikram Sarabhai Research Awards
- PRL Award
- Aayushi award

== Scientific milestones ==
- 1950s: Cosmic rays, atmospheric sciences
- 1960s: Theoretical physics, radio physics
- 1970s: Earth and planetary sciences infrared astronomy
- 1980s: Particle physics, Solar physics
- 1990s: Laser physics and quantum optics, non-linear dynamics and computational physics, astroparticle physics and cosmology
- 2000s: Quantum information, solar X-ray astronomy, submillimeter astronomy, planetary exploration
- 2010s: Exoplanet detection
