= National Geophysical Research Institute =

Geoscientific research organization

- Type: Autonomous, Government, CSIR
- Established: 1961
- Director: Dr. Prakash Kumar
- Location: Hyderabad, Telangana, India

The National Geophysical Research Institute (NGRI) is a geoscientific research organization established in 1961 under the Council of Scientific and Industrial Research (CSIR), India's largest Research and Development organization. It is supported by more than 200 scientists and other technical staff whose research activities are published in several journals of national and international repute.

Research areas covered by this institute include hydrocarbon and coal exploration, mineral exploration, deep seismic sounding studies, exploration and management of groundwater resources, earthquake hazard assessment, studies on the structure and evolution of the Earth's interior (theoretical studies), geophysical instrument development, geothermal exploration, and the development and application of Artificial Intelligence and Machine Learning techniques for geoscientific data analysis, interpretation, and modeling.The institute also plays a leading role in advancing multidisciplinary Earth science research through the integration of field observations, laboratory experiments, and computational modeling to better understand subsurface processes and Earth system dynamics.

The major facilities available at NGRI include:

- Laser Ablation Multi-Collector Inductively Coupled Plasma Mass Spectrometer (LA-MC-ICPMS) with clean chemistry laboratory facility.
- Mineral Physics Laboratory with high-pressure Diamond Anvil Cell (DAC), ultra high resolution (0.02/cm) double monochromator, and micro-Raman spectrometer.
- High-pressure laboratory consisting of Keithly electrometer, strain-measuring sensors, universal testing machine (100 tons), and Bridgeman-Birch high-pressure apparatus.
- In-situ stress measurement facility consisting of hydraulic equipment.
- Rock magnetism laboratory consisting of astatic magnetometer, digital spinner magnetometer, alternating magnetic field and thermal demagnetizers, high-field and low-field hysteresis and susceptibility meter.
- Geochemical laboratory consisting of fully automated X-ray Fluorescence Spectrometer (XRF), Atomic Absorption Spectrometer, Inductively Coupled Plasma Mass Spectrometer (ICPMS), and Electron Probe Micro Analyzer (EPMA).
- Geochronology and isotope geochemistry laboratory with facilities for Rb-Sr, Sm-Nd, and Pb-Pb analyses.
- EM, Resistivity, and IP Model Laboratories.
- Continuous Flow Isotope Ratio Mass Spectrometer Laboratory (CFIRMS).
- Helium Emanometry, Heatflow and Radiometry Laboratory.
- Tritium and carbon dating laboratory for groundwater.
- Centralized computing facilities: PC-LAN and an array of Sun Workstations.
- Thermoluminescence (TR) Optically Stimulated Luminescence (OSL) dating facility.
- Absolute Gravity Lab.
- Airborne magnetic and electromagnetic surveys.
- Laser Interferometer Seismological Observatory (LISO), for precision seismological observations and interferometric monitoring of crustal and lithospheric deformation.
- Centre for Geothermal Energy Research (CGER), for geothermal resource assessment, heat flow studies, and sustainable energy research.
