= Indian Geophysical Union =

Indian government research body

The Indian Geophysical Union is the Government of India's scientific body responsible for all activities related with Earth Science System such as seismology, magnetism, meteorology, geodesy, volcanology, oceanography, hydrology and tectonophysics and to encourage the study of and research in geophysical problems and to provide media for publication of the results. It is situated near another Geophysical Centre Indian National Centre for Ocean Information Services, Hyderabad.

== Awards, Lectures and Medals ==
- PROF.K.R.RAMANATHAN MEMORIAL LECTURE: Instituted in, and issued annually since 1993. An eminent earth/atmospheric scientist is invited to deliver a special lecture on a topic of current scientific interest. The invited scientist is presented with a Gold Medal.
- DR.H.N.SIDDIQUE MEMORIAL LECTURE: Instituted in, and issued annually since 2001, an eminent earth/ocean scientist to deliver a special lecture on a topic of current scientific interest. The invited scientist is presented with a Gold Medal.
- PRINCE MUKHARRAMJAH ENDOWMENT LECTURE: instituted in 1964 an eminent earth scientist to deliver a special lecture on a topic of current scientific interest to earth sciences. Since 1993 the invitee has been presented with a Gold Medal.
- Each year it also gives out the Krishnan Medal for outstanding work by a geophysicist or geologist under the age of 40.
