= Aditi Pant =

Indian oceanographer

- Born: 5 July 1943 (age 83); Nagpur, Bombay state, India
- Education: BSc University of Pune; MSc University of Hawaiʻi; PhD Westfield College; National Chemical Laboratory
- Known for: Oceanography
- Awards: SERC Award; Antarctica Award
- Scientific career
- Fields: Oceanography
- Workplaces: National Institute of Oceanography, India University of Pune Botany Department

Aditi Pant (born 5 July 1943), is an Indian oceanographer. She was the first Indian woman to visit Antarctica, alongside geologist Sudipta Sengupta in 1983 as part of the Indian Antarctic Program. She has held prominent positions at institutions including the National Institute of Oceanography, National Chemical Laboratory, University of Pune, and Maharashtra Academy of Sciences.

== Early life and education ==
Aditi Pant was born in a Marathi-speaking Deshastha Brahmin family in Nagpur, India. Her Father Appa Saheb Pant was a respected diplomat and served Government of India for forty years. He also served as High Commissioner in many countries of Europe and Africa. Her mother Nalini Devi was a medical doctor and a Fellow of the Royal College of Surgeons. Aditi began taking an interest in science at a young age. Her curiosity grew from her exposure to the natural world by her parents, in the form of dinnertime conversation and outdoor activities. At the time Pant was growing up, it was uncommon for women to obtain advanced degrees. Pant completed her BSc at University of Pune (also known as the University of Poona). She was inspired to take up oceanography as a profession when she came across the book The Open Sea by Alister Hardy from a family friend. She was happily surprised to be awarded a US government scholarship to take up a Master of Science in Marine Sciences in the University of Hawaiʻi.^{[3]} Her academic interest lay in photosynthesis in plankton communities. She wrote her thesis on the effect of tropical light intensities on photosynthesis by natural plankton communities and the nature and amount of reduced carbon flow from phytoplankton to bacteria. Studying this target organism in the open sea proved to be very problematic and strenuous, and with help from her mentor Dr. M S Doty, Pant decided to focus on a single bacterium model before moving to a larger community.

Pant then went on to pursue a Doctor of Philosophy in Physiology in Marine Algae at Westfield College London University. Her thesis dealt with the subject matter of the physiology of marine algae. She went on to earn a SERC award and a stipend for her investigations.

== Career ==
Due to financial constraints, her advanced education abroad was not easy to obtain, so it was a joyous event when she got a US Government grant to the University of Hawaiʻi. Her proposition depended on photosynthesis in tiny fish networks as she was first presented to this marine structure in the book "The Open Sea". As she approached the finish of her work for the Ph.D., she had her sights on two or three labs where she would have wanted to work, however, meanwhile she met Professor N K Panikkar, a senior researcher with CSIR, who was the author Director of the National Institute of Oceanography, (NIO) Goa. At NIO between 1973–76, they were bound by the exigencies of our circumstance to beachfront investigations and probably secured the entire west bank of India from Veraval to Kanyakumari and the Gulf of Mannar. The NIO had a 10-year program in the Antarctic Ocean for studies on topics such as; The natural way of life, material science, and various other sciences. By 1990, she had moved out of NIO, following 17 years there, to the National Chemical Laboratory in Pune and went through the following 15 years examining enzymology of salt-tolerant and salt-loving organisms engaged in the food chain. After completing her studies, Pant decided not to pursue a tenure or postdoctoral research position. Instead, she returned to India to join the National Institute of Oceanography (NIO) in Goa, after being inspired by the founder of the institute, N. K. Panikkar.

In 1990, after 17 years of working with the NIO, Pant moved to Pune to work at the National Chemical Laboratory. Here, she studied the enzymology of salt-tolerant and salt-loving microbes involved in the food chain.

She was also Professor Emeritus for the University of Pune Botany Department from 2003 to 2007.

== Antarctic Expedition ==
Between December 1983 and March 1984, Pant embarked on an expedition to one of the most untouched regions on earth, Antarctica. This was the third in a series of expeditions spearheaded by then Prime Minister Indira Gandhi. India's signing of the Antarctic Treaty System Antarctic Treaty in 1981 began the Indian Antarctic Program (under the National Centre for Antarctic and Ocean Research National Centre for Polar and Ocean Research). Along with structural geologist Sudipta Sengupta, Aditi Pant was the first Indian woman to set foot on Antarctica. Pant's expedition was aimed at gathering information related to food chain physics, chemistry, and biology in the Antarctic Ocean. Under the severe and harsh climate conditions Dr. Aditi Pant studied the mainland for four months and turned out with brilliant disclosures. During the course of the mission, the team built Dakshin Gangotri, the first Indian scientific research base station of Antarctica (located 2,500 km from the South Pole). Pant also participated in the fifth expedition to the Antarctic in 1984, carrying out research in oceanography and geology.

== Patents and awards ==
Pant is the owner of five patents and has over 67 publications in international journals. She was honored with the Antarctica Award by the Government of India for her contributions to the Indian Antarctic programme. She shared the honor with colleagues Sudipta Sengupta, Jaya Naithani, and Kanwal Vilku. She was a recipient of the SERC award and stipends for her investigations in her field of research.

She is a member of the Maharashtra Society for the Cultivation of Science, General Body of Maharashtra Association for the Cultivation of Science, Biofuel Committee, Department of Biotechnology, CGO Complex, New Delhi. She is also a fellow member of Maharashtra Academy of Science.

== See also ==
- India's Antarctica Expedition
- An Oceanographer's Life, by Aditi Pant
- Timeline of women in science
