= Women in geology =

List of significant women in the field of geology

Women in geology concerns the history and contributions of women to the field of geology. There has been a long history of women in the field, but they have tended to be under-represented. In the era before the eighteenth century, science and geological science had not been as formalized as they would become later. Hence early geologists tended to be informal observers and collectors, whether they were male or female. Notable examples of this period include Hildegard of Bingen who wrote works concerning stones and Barbara Uthmann who supervised her husband's mining operations after his death. Uthmann was also a relative of Georg Agricola. In addition to these names, various aristocratic women had scientific collections of rocks or minerals.

In the nineteenth century, a new professional class of geologists emerged that included women. In this period the British tended to have far more women of significance to geology.

In 1977 the Association for Women Geoscientists was formed.

== Timeline of women in geology ==
=== 17th century ===
- 1642: Martine Bertereau, first recorded woman mineralogist, was imprisoned in France on suspicion of witchcraft.

=== 19th century ===
- 1824: Emma Hart Willard published Ancient Geography as a supplement to Woodbridge's System of Universal Geography.
- 1833: Mary Austin Holley remarked and published on the soils, water resources, minerals, and mountains of the Texas region.
- 1841: Orra White Hitchcock, Sarah Hall, and Mrs. Brooks were among the first women to illustrate geological publications.
- 1865: Elizabeth Carne was elected the first female Fellow of the Royal Geological Society of Cornwall.
- 1866: Mrs. Myers, Kate Andrews, and Harriet Huntsman's work appeared in the Illinois, Ohio, and Kansas survey reports respectively.
- 1889: Mary Emilie Holmes became the first female Fellow of the Geological Society of America.
- 1893: Catherine Raisin became the first woman to receive the "Lyell Fund" award from the Geological Society of London. However, a man needed to accept the honor for her benefit, since the Geological Society of London did not permit women to go to its gatherings at the time.
- 1893: Florence Bascom became the second woman to earn her Ph.D. in geology in the United States, and the first woman to receive a Ph.D. from Johns Hopkins University. Geologists consider her to be the "first woman geologist in this country [United States]."
- 1896: Florence Bascom became the first woman to work for the United States Geological Survey.

=== 20th century ===
- 1901: Florence Bascom became the first female geologist to present a paper before the Geological Survey of Washington.
- 1907: A decision was made by the Geological Society of London to admit women as Associates, under the condition they distinguished themselves as geological investigators or submitted their own original research.
- 1909: Alice Wilson became the first female geologist hired by the Geological Survey of Canada. She is widely credited as being the first Canadian woman geologist.
- 1919: Women were first allowed to become Fellows of the Geological Society of London. Margaret Crosfield became the first, due to alphabetical primacy, of the first eight women to be elected Fellows of the Geological Society of London, on 21 May 1919.
- 1921: Ludmila Slavíková was made head of the Department of Mineralogy and Petrology at the National Museum in Prague.
- 1924: Florence Bascom became the first woman elected to the Council of the Geological Society of America.
- 1936: Inge Lehmann discovered that the Earth has a solid inner core distinct from its molten outer core.
- 1938: Alice Wilson became the first woman appointed as Fellow to the Royal Society of Canada.
- 1942: American geologist Marguerite Williams became the first African-American woman to receive a PhD in geology in the United States. She completed her doctorate, entitled A History of Erosion in the Anacostia Drainage Basin, at Catholic University.
- 1943: Eileen Guppy was promoted to the rank of assistant geologist, therefore becoming the first female geology graduate appointed to the scientific staff of the British Geological Survey.
- 1948: Doris Schachner became the first female professor for mineralogy in Germany
- 1953: Alice Mary Weeks, and Mary E. Thompson of the United States Geological Survey, identified uranophane.
- 1955: Moira Dunbar became the first female glaciologist to study sea ice from a Canadian icebreaker ship.
- 1957: In 1957, Marie Tharp and Heezen published the first physiographic map of the North Atlantic Ocean floor.
- 1963: Elsa G. Vilmundardóttir completed her studies at Stockholm University and became the first female Icelandic geologist.
- 1966: Eileen Guppy became the first female staff member of the British Geological Survey to be awarded an MBE.
- 1967: Sue Arnold became the first female British Geological Survey person to go to sea on a research vessel.
- 1969: Beris Cox became the first female paleontologist in the British Geological Survey.
- 1971: Audrey Jackson became the first female field geologist in the British Geological Survey.
- 1975: Female officers of the British Geological Survey no longer had to resign upon getting married.
- 1977: The Association for Women Geoscientists was founded.
- 1980: Geochemist Katsuko Saruhashi became the first woman elected to the Science Council of Japan.
- 1982: Janet Watson became the first female president of the Geological Society of London.
- 1983: Geologist Sudipta Sengupta (and marine biologist Aditi Pant) became one of the first two Indian women to join an Antarctic expedition.
- 1991: Doris Malkin Curtis became the first female president of the Geological Society of America.
- 1991: Indian geologist Sudipta Sengupta became the first woman scientist to receive the Shanti Swaroop Bhatnagar Award in the Earth Sciences category.
- 1991: H. Catherine W. Skinner becomes the first woman to win the Mineralogical Society of America's distinguished public service medal.
- 1995: Karst in China: its Geomorphology and Environment by Marjorie Sweeting was published; it was the first comprehensive Western account of China's karst.
- 1995: Jane Plant became the first female Deputy Director of the British Geological Survey.

=== 21st century ===
- 2010: Marcia McNutt became the first female director of the United States Geological Survey.
- 2014: Maureen Raymo became the first woman to be awarded the Wollaston Medal, the highest award of the Geological Society of London.
- 2016: Geophysicist Marcia McNutt became the first female president of the American National Academy of Sciences.
- 2019: Karen Hanghøj became the first female director of the British Geological Survey.

== See also ==
- Women in science
- Women in the workforce
