= Ved Prakash =

Ved Prakash may refer to:

- Ved Prakash Airy, Indian army officer
- Ved Prakash Goyal, Indian politician
- Ved Prakash Gupta, Indian politician
- Ved Prakash Kamboj, Indian endocrinologist
- Ved Prakash Malik, Indian army officer
- Ved Prakash Marwah, Indian police officer
- Ved Prakash Nanda, Indian-American academic
- Ved Prakash Sharma, Indian writer

== See also ==
- Ved Parkash, Indian politician
- Rajesh Vedprakash, Indian voice actor
