= Himadri (research station) =

Himadri Station
- Arctic Research Station
- Location within Svalbard
- Coordinates: 78°55′N 11°56′E
- Country: India Norway
- Established: 1 July 2008
- Named for: Himadri Range of Himalayas

Government
  - Type: Polar Research Organisation
  - Body: National Centre for Polar and Ocean Research

Himadri is India's first permanent Arctic research station located at Spitsbergen, Svalbard, Norway. It is located at the International Arctic Research base, Ny-Ålesund. It was inaugurated on the 1st of July, 2008 by the Minister of Earth Sciences. It was set up during India's second Arctic expedition in June 2008. It is located at a distance of 1,200 kilometres (750 mi) from the North Pole.

== Research Goals ==
Himadri's functions include long term monitoring of the fjord (Kongsfjorden) dynamics, and atmospheric research. The primary goals of India's research includes research on aerosol radiation, space weather, food-web dynamics, microbial communities, glaciers, sedimentology, and carbon recycling. The research base has devoted time for the research of governance and policy of the Arctic. India has prioritised research and study in the fields of genetics, glaciology, geology, pollution in the atmosphere, and space weather among other fields.

In 2012–2013, a total of 25 scientists visited the base which was staffed for 185 days to carry out studies under 10 distinct projects.

== Strategic Interests ==
The United States Geological Survey estimates that 22% of the world's oil and natural gas could be located beneath the Arctic. India's ONGC Videsh is reported to be interested in joint-venture with Russia for oil exploration and has reportedly requested Rosneft for stake in a project. In addition, using Arctic sea lanes for shipping would reduce voyage times by 40% compared to Indian, Pacific or Atlantic Ocean routes. On 15 May 2013, India was made a permanent observer at the Arctic Council.

India is the 11th country after Britain, Germany, France, Italy, China, Japan, South Korea, The Netherlands, Sweden and Norway to set up a permanent research station in Ny-Ålesund.

== Description ==
The station was set up in a refurbished two floored building with four bedrooms. The building has an area of 220 m^{2} (2,400 sq ft) and has other facilities including a computer room, store room, drawing room and internet. It can host eight scientists at normal conditions. The crew of the station are given training in shooting with rifles to protect themselves from polar bears.

== New research in Arctic IndARC ==
Established in August 2014. Designed and developed by scientists from the National Centre for Polar and Ocean Research (NCPOR) and National Institute of Ocean Technology (NIOT), the observatory has been deployed in the Kongsfjorden fjord of the Arctic, roughly halfway between Norway and the North Pole is named IndARC

== See also ==
- List of research stations in the Arctic
