= Subir Kumar Ghosh =

Bengali Earth, Atmosphere, Ocean and Planetary scientist

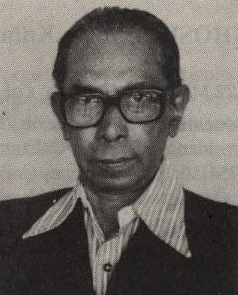
- Born: 1 March 1932; Kolkata, West Bengal, India
- Died: 30 October 2008 (aged 76); Kolkata, West Bengal, India
- Education: Calcutta University; Presidency College, Kolkata; Uppsala University
- Known for: Studies on theoretical and experimental structural geology
- Awards: 1977 Shanti Swarup Bhatnagar Prize; 1998 INSA K. Naha Memorial Medal
- Scientific career
- Fields: Structural geology
- Workplaces: Calcutta University; Jadavpur University
- Doctoral advisor: Santosh Kumar Roy

Subir Kumar Ghosh (1 March 1932 – 30 October 2008) was an Indian structural geologist and an emeritus professor at Jadavpur University. He was known for his studies on theoretical and experimental structural geology and was an elected fellow of the Indian National Science Academy, and the Indian Academy of Sciences. The Council of Scientific and Industrial Research, the apex agency of the Government of India for scientific research, awarded him the Shanti Swarup Bhatnagar Prize for Science and Technology, one of the highest Indian science awards for his contributions to Earth, Atmosphere, Ocean, and Planetary Sciences in 1977.

== Biography ==
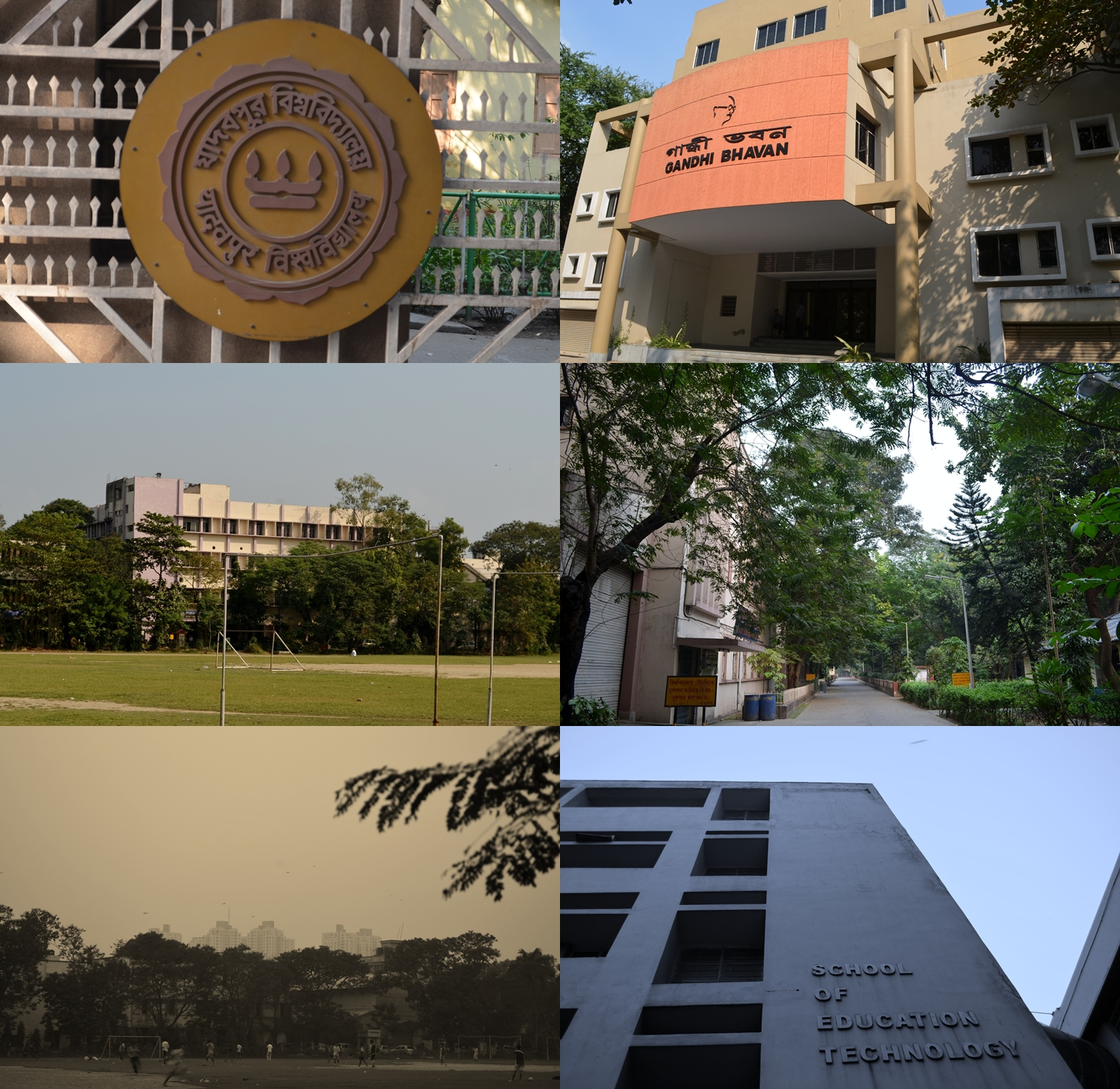
Jadavpur University

Born on 1 March 1932 in the Indian state of West Bengal, S. K. Ghosh graduated in science (BSc) from University of Kolkata and after completing a master's degree from the same institution, he joined his alma mater as a member of the faculty of geology in 1958. Simultaneously, enrolled at Presidency College, Kolkata for his doctoral studies under the guidance of Santosh Kumar Ray and secured a PhD working on the time-correlation of the structural and metamorphic histories of the terrain in Kuilapal village in Purulia District. Subsequently, he moved to Uppsala University where he worked under Hans Ramberg, a renowned geologist who would later lend his name to Rambergite mineral. He stayed with Ramberg for two years at the end of which period he received the degree of Filosofisk doktorgrad from Uppsala University in 1967 and returned to join Jadavpur University where he set up an experimental laboratory to continue his researches. He served the university till his superannuation in 1997 but continued his association post-retirement as an emeritus professor, an INSA senior scientist, and as an INSA honorary scientist. During this period, he also had a short stint in Sweden as a research associate for the Swedish National Programme for the Geodynamics Project.

Dr. Ghosh was married to Sheila Ghosh née Sen and the couple's son Abhik Ghosh is a noted chemist. He died on 30 October 2008, at the age of 76.

== Legacy ==
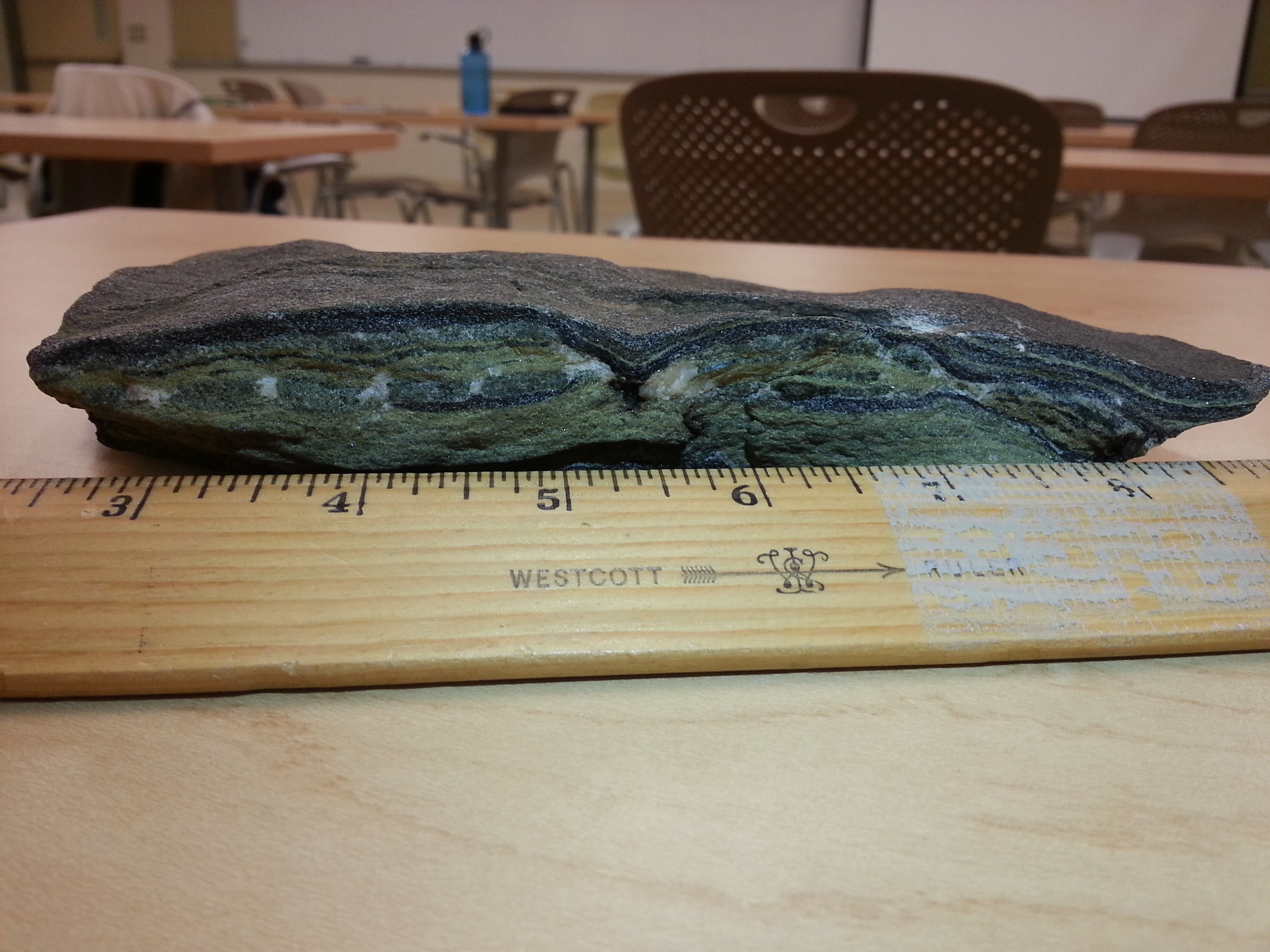
Boudinage

Focusing his attention on the theoretical and experimental aspects of structural geology, Ghosh studied the geometrical relationships of the axial surfaces of folds with the principal planes of deformation and his researches assisted in the wider understanding of the geological phenomena such as superposed buckle folding, buckling due to constructional deformation, rotation of spherical and ellipsoidal inclusions in shear zones, deformation of early lineations, chocolate tablet boudinage and evolution of shear zone structures. A theory on conglomerate deformation and an analysis of the mechanism of distortion of planar structure around rigid bodies have been credited to him. His researches have been documented as a book, Structural Geology: Fundamentals and Modern Developments, as chapters in books edited by others and as over 50 peer-reviewed articles, (Note: Please see Selected bibliography section) the article repository of the Indian Academy of Sciences has listed a number of them. He also published a field guide for field research in Ghatsila. He served as a National professor of the University Grants Commission of India during 1979–80 and sat in the editorial boards of the Journal of Structural Geology of Oxford University Press and Tectonophysics of Elsevier, besides mentoring thirteen doctoral scholars in their studies.

== Awards and honors ==
The Council of Scientific and Industrial Research awarded Ghosh the Shanti Swarup Bhatnagar Prize, one of the highest Indian science awards, in 1977. The Indian National Science Academy elected him as their fellow in 1979, INSA would honor him again in 1998 with K. Naha Memorial Medal. The same year, the Indian Academy of Sciences also elected him as a fellow. Evolution of Geological Structures in Micro- to Macro-scales, edited by Sudipta Sengupta and published by Springer in 1997 is a festschrift on Ghosh and Kshitindramohan Naha, another noted geologist.

== Selected bibliography ==
=== Books ===
- S.K. Ghosh (24 October 2013). Structural Geology: Fundamentals and Modern Developments. Elsevier. ISBN 978-0-08-098399-8.
- Subir Kumar Ghosh; Sanjib Chandra Sarkar; Sudipta Sengupta (1987). A field guide for Ghatsila and neighbouring mineral-belt. Jadavpur University. p. 87.

=== Chapters ===
- Hans Ramberg; Hemin A. Koyi; Neil S. Mancktelow (2001). Tectonic Modeling: A Volume in Honor of Hans Ramberg. Geological Society of America. pp. 1–. ISBN 978-0-8137-1193-5.
- S. Sengupta (6 December 2012). Evolution of Geological Structures in Micro- to Macro-scales. Springer Science & Business Media. ISBN 978-94-011-5870-1.

=== Articles ===
- Kshitindramohan Naha, Subir Kumar Ghosh (1960). "Archaean Palaeogeography of Eastern and Northern Singhbhum, Eastern India". Geological Magazine. 97 (5) (published October 1960): 436–439. Bibcode:1960GeoM...97..436N. doi:10.1017/S0016756800061781. S2CID 140183934.
- Subir Kumar Ghosh (1970). "A theoretical study of intersecting fold patterns". Tectonophysics. 9 (6) (published June 1970): 559–569. Bibcode:1970Tectp...9..559G. doi:10.1016/0040-1951(70)90006-5.
- Subir Kumar Ghosh (2001). "Types of transpressional and transtensional deformation". GSA Memoirs. 193 (published April 2000): 1–20. doi:10.1130/0-8137-1193-2.1. ISBN 9780813711935.

== See also ==
- Kshitindramohan Naha
- Abhik Ghosh
- Hans Ramberg
- Sudipta Sengupta
