= Manju Sharma (biologist) =

Indian biotechnologist (1940–2024)

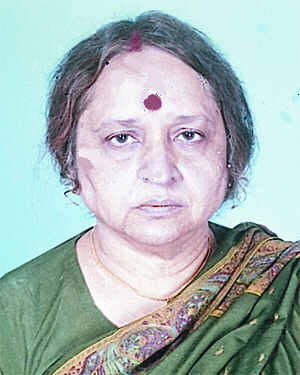
- Born: 13 December 1940
- Died: 31 October 2024 (aged 83); New Delhi, India
- Education: University of Lucknow (Ph.D.)
- Known for: Research and Administration in Biotechnology
- Spouse: Vinod Prakash Sharma
- Children: Amit Sharma
- Awards: Padma Bhushan (in 2007)
- Scientific career
- Fields: Biotechnology, plant science
- Workplaces: Purdue University; Institute of Plant Anatomy and Cytology, Denmark; Forest Research Institute; Institute of Advanced Research
- Patrons: Government of India, The Puri Foundation for Education in India

Manju Sharma (13 December 1940 – 31 October 2024) was an Indian biotechnologist and administrator of several scientific research and policy-making bodies in India. She was most recently the president and executive director at the Indian Institute of Advanced Research in Gandhinagar, Gujarat. She earlier served as the secretary, Department of Biotechnology, in the Indian Ministry of Science and Technology, and was awarded the Padma Bhushan in 2007.

Some credit Sharma with pioneering biotechnology research in India. She played a significant role in establishing several institutions in the country, including the National Institute of Immunology, the National Institute of Plant Genome Research, the Biomass Research Centres at Lucknow and Madurai, the Plant Molecular Biology Unit in University of Delhi and the Centre for DNA Fingerprinting and Diagnostics.

== Life and career ==
Sharma was the granddaughter of Madan Mohan Malaviya, an educationist and politician. She was married to Vinod Prakash Sharma, a malariologist and entomologist. Their son, Amit Sharma, specialises in protein crystallography.

Sharma graduated from Lucknow University, winning the first rank and receiving the Birbal Sahni Memorial Gold Medal. She earned her Ph.D. at Lucknow University in 1961 and then worked at Purdue University as a post-doctoral researcher. Collaborating with A. Carl Leopold and Richard Hall, her research on enhancing latex production through the use of ethereal oil found commercial application in Malaysian rubber plantations.

Sharma's research on plant idioblasts led to her becoming a visiting scientist at the Institute of Plant Anatomy and Cytology, University of Copenhagen. She then joined the Forest Research Institute, Dehra Dun, where in researching woody plants, she established a correlation between silica content and the hardness of wood. After moving to Delhi, she became a research officer at the Indian Council of Medical Research and co-authored a monograph on Indian medicinal plants.

Sharma joined the Indian Department of Science and Technology in 1974 as a senior scientific officer. She became the senior advisor in 1990, and assumed charge as the secretary of the government body in 1996. She was instrumental in the creation of the Biotech Consortium India Limited, a public-private partnership to promote the commercialization of biotechnology research. Upon the completion of her tenure, she was appointed advisor to the Ministry of Science and Technology in 2004.

Sharma founded the Indian Institute of Advanced Research in 2006, helped by endowments from the Puri Foundation for Education in India, to conduct research and provide higher education in plant sciences, human health, biomolecular medicine and bioinformatics. She served as president and executive director until 2012, when the institute re-constituted itself as a university and introduced a new governance mechanism. When M. S. Swaminathan took initiative in introducing a chapter on science and technology for women in the Sixth Five-Year Plan (1980–85), a team led by Sharma prepared a report which was incorporated in the plan document on women and development. This was the first focused scheme on the subject, which has since been operated by the Department of Science and Technology.

Sharma died in New Delhi on 31 October 2024, at the age of 83.

== Awards and honours ==
- The Chandaben Mohanbhai Patel Industrial Research Award for Women Scientists (1991)
- The Borlaug Award (1995)
- The first woman president of the National Academy of Sciences (1995–96)
- President of the Indian Science Congress Association (1999)
- The Dr B. P. Pal Memorial Award from the Indian Science Congress Association (2001)
- G. M. Modi Science Award (2002)
- Padma Bhushan (2007)
- Honorary Doctorate, Purdue University (2012)
- Fellow, The World Academy of Sciences
- Honorary Fellow, Indian Society of Agricultural Biochemists
- The first chairperson of the International Council for Science's Forum on Science for Women (2004)
