= Amit Singh (scientist) =

Indian microbiologist

- Born: March 18, 1976 (age 50); India
- Education: Indian Institute of Technology Roorkee; University of Delhi South Campus; University of Alabama at Birmingham
- Known for: Mycobacterium tuberculosis pathogenesis
- Awards: 2021 Shanti Swarup Bhatnagar Prize for Science and Technology; 2017/18 N-BIOS Prize
- Scientific career
- Fields: Microbiology
- Workplaces: International Centre for Genetic Engineering and Biotechnology; Indian Institute of Science
- Doctoral advisor: Anil Kumar Tyagi; Adrie JC Steyn

Amit Singh (born 18 March 1976) is an Indian microbiologist and professor in the Department of Microbiology & Cell Biology at the Indian Institute of Science. His research focuses on pathogenesis, including drug resistance mechanisms in both mycobacterium tuberculosis (TB) and human immunodeficiency viruses (HIV).

== Biography ==
Amit Singh was born on 18 March 1976. He earned a Bachelor of Science from the University of Delhi, and a master's in Biotechnology from the Indian Institute of Technology Roorkee. In 2004, he completed a PhD under the supervision of Professor Anil Kumar Tyagi at the University of Delhi South Campus. Subsequently, he conducted postdoctoral research in the lab of Dr. Adrie JC Steyn at the University of Alabama in Birmingham (UAB).

Upon returning to India in 2010 Singh held a Wellcome Trust-DBT Intermediate Fellowship at the International Centre for Genetic Engineering and Biotechnology. In January 2014 he became an assistant professor of microbiology and cell biology at the Indian Institute of Science (IISc). He leads a research group at the Centre for Infectious Disease Research, investigating the mechanisms of chronic human infections with a focus on Mycobacterium tuberculosis and human immunodeficiency virus (HIV).

== Awards ==
Singh has held a Wellcome Trust-DBT Senior Fellowship since 2016. He received the 2017/18 National Bioscience Award for Career Development from the Department of Biotechnology of the Government of India.

Singh is a co-inventor on a patent titled "Shortening Tuberculosis Therapy and Reducing Relapse by Co-administering Chloroquine in TB and HIV-TB Co-infected Conditions," filed in 2020 and published in 2021.

In 2021, Singh was awarded the Shanti Swarup Bhatnagar Prize for Science and Technology for his contributions to understanding host-pathogen interactions in Mycobacterium tuberculosis and HIV. In 2022, Singh was included in the Asian Scientist 100 list.

== Publications ==
=== Most cited articles at University of Alabama ===
- Singh, A; Crossman, DK; Mai, D; Guidry, L; Voskuil, MI; Renfrow, MB; Steyn, AJ (2009). "Mycobacterium tuberculosis WhiB3 maintains redox homeostasis by regulating virulence lipid anabolism to modulate macrophage response". PLOS Pathog. 5 (8) e1000545. doi:10.1371/journal.ppat.1000545. PMC 2718811. PMID 19680450. (Cited by 204 articles according to Google Scholar.)
- Singh, A; Guidry, L; Narasimhulu, KV; Mai, D; Trombley, J; Redding, KE; Giles, GI; Lancaster, JR Jr; Steyn, AJ (2007). "Mycobacterium tuberculosis WhiB3 responds to O2 and nitric oxide via its [4Fe-4S] cluster and is essential for nutrient starvation survival". Proc Natl Acad Sci U S A. 104 (28): 11562–7. Bibcode:2007PNAS..10411562S. doi:10.1073/pnas.0700490104. PMC 1906726. PMID 17609386. (Cited by 154 articles according to Google Scholar.)

=== Most cited articles at IISc ===
- Ashima Bhaskar, Manbeena Chawla, Mansi Mehta, Pankti Parikh, Pallavi Chandra, Devayani Bhave, Dhiraj Kumar, Kate S Carroll, Amit Singh. Reengineering redox sensitive GFP to measure mycothiol redox potential of Mycobacterium tuberculosis during infection. 2014. PLOS Pathogens. 10:1 e1003902. (Cited by 88 articles according to Google Scholar.)
- Rufai SB, Kumar P, Singh A, Prajapati S, Balooni V, Singh S. Comparison of Xpert MTB/RIF with line probe assay for detection of rifampin-monoresistant Mycobacterium tuberculosis. Journal of clinical microbiology. 2014 June; 52 (6): 1846–52. (Cited by 76 articles according to Google Scholar.)
- Chawla M, Parikh P, Saxena A, Munshi M, Mehta M, Mai D, Srivastava AK, Narasimhulu KV, Redding KE, Vashi N, Kumar D. Adrie JC Steyn and Amit Singh. Mycobacterium tuberculosis WhiB4 regulates oxidative stress response to modulate survival and dissemination in vivo. Molecular microbiology. 2012 September; 85 (6): 1148–65. (Cited by 56 articles according to Google Scholar.)
