= Amit Singh =

Amit Singh may refer to:

- Amit Singh (cricketer), Indian cricketer
- Amit Singh (scientist), Indian microbiologist

== See also ==
- Amit Singhal, Indian-American computer engineer
