= Sunil Kumar Singh =

Sunil Kumar Singh may refer to:

- Sunil Kumar Singh (Bihar politician) (died 2020), Indian politician
- Sunil Kumar Singh (Jharkhand politician) (born 1962), Indian politician
- Sunil Kumar Singh (geochemist) (born 1971), Indian geochemist
