= Vigyan Gaurav Award =

The Vigyan Gaurav Award or the Vigyan Gaurav Samman is a lifetime achievement award for scientific research conferred by the Council of Science and Technology, Government of Uttar Pradesh in India. The council also presents a Vigyan Ratna Award. Since 2013, the award includes cash price of ₹500,000 (US$5,200) which was earlier ₹100,000 (US$1,000). This is the highest science related award given by Uttar Pradesh government.

== Recipients ==
- 2000 - Ved Prakash Kamboj
- 2001 - 2002 - Prem Chand Pandey
- 2002-03 - Dr. Lalji Singh - Vice-Chancellor of Banaras Hindu University
- 2003-04 - Dr. J. S. Yadav - director of Indian Institute of Chemical Technology (IICT), Hyderabad
- 2003-04 - Dr. R. P. Bajpai - director of Central Scientific Instruments Organisation (CSIO), Chandigarh
- 2005-06 - Professor Javed Iqbal- Director, Institute of Life Sciences, University of Hyderabad Campus, Gachibowli, Hyderabad
- 2008-09 - Prof. Anil Kumar Tyagi - head of biochemistry department, Delhi University
- 2008-09 - Prof. Kabiruddin - chemistry department, Aligarh Muslim University
- 2010-11 - Prof. R. K. Sharma - director of Sanjay Gandhi Post Graduate Institute of Medical Sciences
- 2010-11 - Prof. Sunil Pradhan - neurologist at Sanjay Gandhi Post Graduate Institute of Medical Sciences
- 2010-11 - Prof. Mohammad Iqbal - professor of botany from Jamia Hamdard University
- 2010-11 - Chandra Shekhar Nautiyal - director of National Botanical Research Institute
- 2015-16 - Prof. Nirmal Kumar Gupta - Head of Cardio Vascular Thoracic Surgery, Sanjay Gandhi Post Graduate Institute of Medical Sciences, Lucknow

== See also ==
- List of general science and technology awards
