= Prem Chand Pandey =

Indian scientist

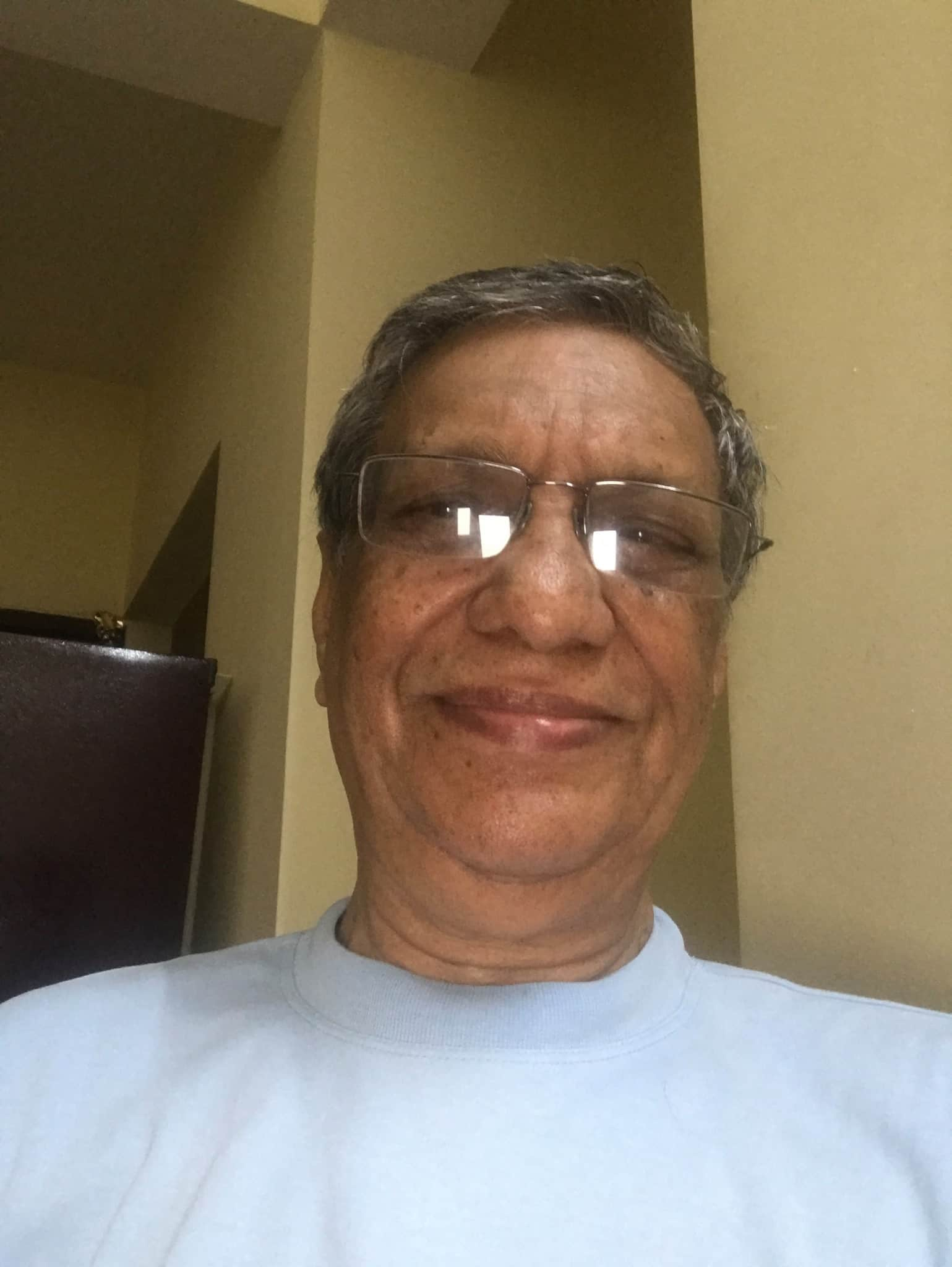
- Prem Chand Pandey at his residence of Indian Institute of Technology Kharagpur
- Born: 10 August 1945 (age 81); Ramapur, United Provinces, British India
- Education: University of Allahabad
- Known for: Polar-Remote Sensing; Bhaskara Satellite series ISRO's past and future mission such as OCEANSAT and CLIMATESAT Ocean-Satellite, Indian Remote Sensing satellite, Climate-Satellite, and Indian Antarctic Program
- Awards: NASA Certificate of Recognition and Cash Award; Shanti Swarup Bhatnagar Award; Vigyan Gaurav Award
- Scientific career
- Fields: Space Science, Planetary Scientist, Climate-Satellites, Polar-Remote Sensing
- Workplaces: Space Applications Centre; Indian Space Research Organization (ISRO); Ministry of Earth Sciences; NCAOR; IIT Kharagpur; IIT Bhubaneswar
- Doctoral advisor: S. L. Srivastava

Prem Chand Pandey is an Indian space, and planetary scientist, academic in the fields of satellite oceanography, remote sensing, atmospheric science, the Antarctic and climate change, and the founding director of the National Centre for Polar and Ocean Research (NCPOR).

== Education and career ==
Pandey obtained his masters and bachelor's degrees in Electronics and science respectively from Allahabad University. He completed his D.Phil. degree from the same university (on microwaves) in 1972.

In 1966, Pandey became a lecturer in DAV Degree college, Azamgarh. From 1968 to 1972 he was Council of Scientific and Industrial Research Research Fellow at the microwave research laboratory of the Department of Physics, University of Allahabad, and from 1973 to 1977 a research officer at the Central Water and Power Research Station, Khadakwasla. In 1977 he joined the Space Applications Centre (SAC)/ ISRO, Ahmedabad and became the founder head of the Oceanic Sciences Division/ Meteorology and Oceanography Group/ Remote Sensing Applications Area (OSD/ MOG/ RESA). He worked for the next twenty years at SAC. In the 1980s he was also a research associate at the NASA – Jet Propulsion Laboratory, Pasadena, where he worked on the Upper Atmosphere Research Satellite and SEASAT programs. During 1997–2005, he was the founding director of the National Centre for Polar and Ocean Research (NCPOR)/Ministry of Earth Sciences (MoES), Goa. At the initiative of Murali Manohar Joshi he founded the K. Banerjee Centre of Atmospheric and Ocean Studies (KBCAOS) to initiate Atmospheric and Ocean Science Studies at Allahabad University which is now a full-fledged faculty academic centre of Allahabad University. He was Visiting Professor at the Center for Ocean, River, Atmosphere and Land Sciences (CORAL), IIT Kharagpur (IIT-Kgp) from 2005 to 2007 then Emeritus Professor from 2007 to August 2011, playing a key role in the establishment of the CORAL. He joined the faculty of School of Earth, Ocean and Climate Sciences, IIT Bhubaneswar as a Professor with effect from 1 September 2011. where also he played key role in establishment of the School of Earth, Ocean and Climate Sciences, IIT Bhubaneswar and after a satisfactory development of this school, Dr. Pandey returned to IIT Kharagpur (IIT-Kgp) and worked as Emeritus Professor since 20 November 2017 as to 25 November 2020. Currently he is working as adjunct professor at Department of Earth Sciences, IIT Gandhinagar since 1 January 2021.

== Honour and awards ==
- Fellow of the National Academy of Sciences, India, Indian Meteorological Society, Indian Academy of Sciences, Society of Earth Science India, Indian Geophysical Union, Indian Society of Remote Sensing, Dehradun (1999). Indian Society for Mathematical Modelling and Computer Simulation and Geological Society of India, Bangalore.
- Certificate of Recognition and Cash Award-1985 by NASA.
- Shanti Swarup Bhatnagar Prize for Science and Technology Award in Earth, Atmosphere, Ocean and Planetary Sciences (1989) given by Council of Scientific and Industrial Research (CSIR) for outstanding scientific contributions. He is the first recipient of this award from the subdivision of Ocean and Atmosphere because from this year onwards, the scope of recognition under discipline Earth Sciences has been extended to Atmosphere, Ocean and Planetary Sciences as per statement of the CSIR (SSB Prize) web page as on 17 August 2020.
- Vigyan Gaurav Award awarded by the Council of Science and Technology, Government of Uttar Pradesh (2001–02)
- Prof. K. R. Ramanathan Memorial Gold Medal awarded by the Indian Geophysical Union (2007)
- Bharat Gaurav Award in the field of Science and Technology by India International Friendship Society (2001)
- Om Prakash Bhasin Award in Engineering Including Energy and Aero Space 2004–2005
- Hari Om Ashram Prerit Dr. Vikram Sarabhai Award and gold medal in the field of Atmospheric Sciences and Hydrology, in 1987 (first recipient in ISRO)
- D.Sc. (Hornoris Causa) from V B. S. Purvanchal University, Jaunpur
- Khosla National Award, Gold Medal and Citation by Indian Institute of Technology, Roorkee, during convocation Ceremony, 15 November 2007
- The Rekha Nandi and Bhupesh Nandi Prize from the Institution of Engineers (India)
- Felicitation by Shri Kapil Sibal, Honorable Minister for S/T and Ocean Development, for outstanding achievements in Polar Science & Ocean Science and Technology, on 27 July 2004, on DOD (MoES) foundation Day.
- An Honour of "Proud Past Alumni" in the list of 42 members, from "Allahabad University Alumni Association", NCR, Ghaziabad (Greater Noida) Chapter 2007–2008 registered under society act 1860 with registration no. 407/2000.
- Honoured by listed as Distinguish Alumni in the official Distinguish Alumni list of University of Allahabad.

== Membership ==
- IIT Kharagpur Nominee : Ocean Atmospheric Science and Technology Cell of MoES
- Advisory Board Member, Text Books for Higher Education : The Energy Research Institute, New Delhi
- Member of the Working Group on Promotion of Radar Meteorology, in Kolkata : India Meteorological Department, New Delhi
- Member, ISRO-CNES Joint Working Group : Indian Space Research Organisation, Bangalore
- Chairman, National Advisory Committee, to set up School of Earth Ocean and Climate Sciences : Indian Institute of Technology Bhubaneswar
- Member, Joint Scientific Working Group of SAC-ISRO, for SARAL Mission
- Chairman, Research Advisory Committee of Indian Institute of Tropical Meteorology (IITM), Pune
- Member, Governing Council, IITM, Pune.
- Honorary Professor, Goa University
- Member, Academic Council, Goa University (Governor's Nominee).
- Member : (Visitor's Nominee )Selection Committee for Earth Sciences in Pondicherry University (A Central University).
- Adjunct Professor at BITS (Goa Region) (up to 2007).
- Member, Special Advisory committee, School of Environmental Science Jawaharlal Nehru University (JNU), Delhi
- Chairman, National Academy of Sciences, India, Kharagpur local Chapter
- Member, Research Advisory Committee of Center of Atmospheric Sciences (CAS) of IIT Delhi.
- Vice Chairman of OSTC Cell of DOD at Mangalore/ Tamil University.
- Member, High Power Ministerial delegation led by Hon Shri Kapil Sibal to Antarctica.
- Member, ICSU/WMO committee for International Polar Year (IPY) framework documents preparation.
- President (sectional); Environmental Science Section, Indian Science Congress Association, 2006–7.
- Also remained member of Executive Council of the Indian Geophysical Union (1991–1993).

== Works ==
Pandey has published more than 134 research papers, 7 books, 9 reports and 4 Atlases, and has guided 11 PhDs. He has also edited the journals Marine Geodesy, Indian Journal of Polar Science, 2008 and the Remote Sensing section in Mausam, the quarterly research journal of India Meteorological Department. He has been a member of the editorial board of the Journal of the Indian Society of Remote Sensing Indian Journal of Radio & Space Physics (IJRSP), Indian Journal of Marine Science, India (1995–2000), Vayu Mandal, Bulletin of Indian Meteorological Society, (1995–1996), Proceedings of Indian Academics (Physical Sciences) and the Journal of Indian Society of Remote Sensing (2006).

=== Bibliography ===
- Advances in Marine and Antarctic Science, with Dinabandhu Sahoo. APH Publishing, 2002. ISBN 81-7648-347-8. Excerpts
- India in the Antarctic: Scientific and Geopolitical Perspectives, with Sanjay Chaturvedi, Neloy Khare, Centre for the Study of Geopolitics, National Centre for Antarctic and Ocean Research, India. 2005. ISBN 81-7003-287-3.
- Dharati Se Pare Antariksha Tak: Vigyan Ki Pahal, with Neloy Khare, National Centre for Antarctic and Ocean Research, India. 2001.
- Bharat Me Vigyan Ki Uplabdhiyan: Ek Jhalak, with Neloy Khare, National Centre for Antarctic and Ocean Research, India. 2002.
- Antarctic Geoscience, Ocean -Atmosphere interaction and Palaeoclimatology, with S. Rajan, National Centre for Antarctic and Ocean Research, India. 2005.
- Dharakata Mahadweep, with Neloy Khare and Rakesh Sharma, National Centre for Antarctic and Ocean Research, India. 1998.
- Pandey, P.C. (2007) in "India: Antarctic Program", Encyclopedia of the Antarctic edited by Beau Riffenburgh, pp. 529–530, Abingdon and New York: Taylor & Francis, ISBN 0-415-97024-5.
- Remote Sensing Applications to Coastal Oceanography, in Modelling and Monitoring of Coastal Marine Processes, with Rakumar, A K Verma, A K Mathur and Neera Chaturvedi, Antarctic Study Centre-National Centre for Antarctic and Ocean Research, Space Application Centre(ISRO), pp 45–55, Edited by C. R. Murthy, P. C. Sinha and Y. R. Rao, India. 2008. Springer Netherlands.ISBN 1-4020-8326-2.Excerpts
