= N. Kesava Panikkar =

Indian zoologist (1913–1977)

Nedumangattu Kesava Panikkar
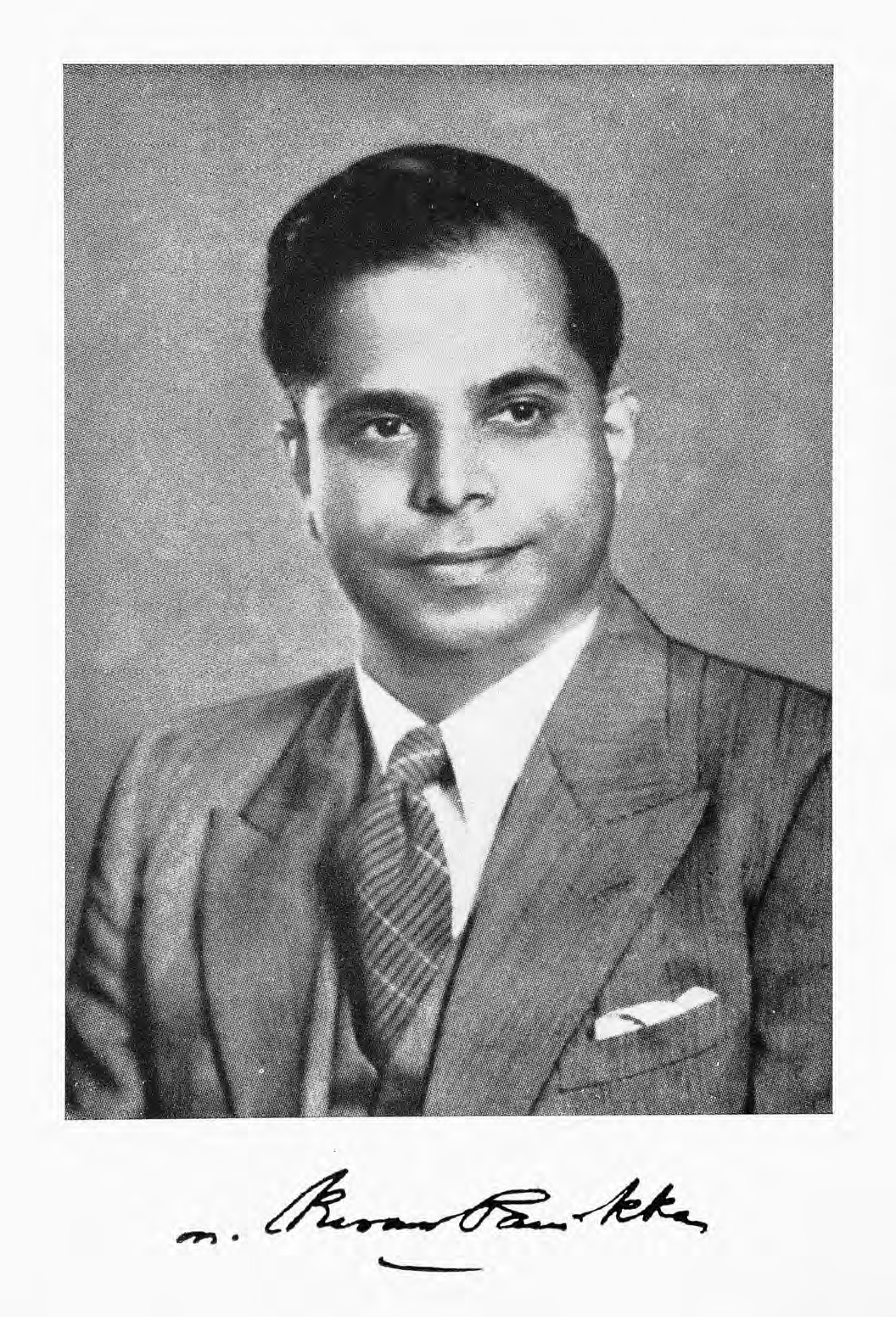
- N. Kesava Panikkar
- Born: 17 May 1913; Kerala, India
- Died: 24 June 1977 (aged 64); Tiruvanathpuram, India
- Occupation: Zoologist
- Known for: Marine biological research
- Awards: Padma Shri; Galathea Medal of Denmark; ZSI Sir Dorabji Tata Medal; INSA Chandrakala Hora Medal

Nedumangattu Kesava Panikkar (1913–1977) was an Indian zoologist, a former director of the Central Marine Fisheries Research Institute, a former adviser to the Government of India on fishery development and a former vice chancellor of the Cochin University of Science and Technology. He was a recipient of the Indian civilian award of Padma Shri in 1973.

== Life sketch ==
Panikkar was born 17 May 1913 in Kottayam, Kerala. He was the only son of his parents Sankunni Menon and JJanaki. His father was a Headmaster of a Government High School in Travancore State. Panikkar did his primary, secondary and initial college education from C. M. S. College, Kottayam. A doctoral degree (DSc) holder from the University of Madras, he was reported to have undertaken research on marine organisms, conducted 22 voyages in the Indian Ocean for collecting specimens and credited with the compilation of a series of atlases. His efforts were also reported behind the establishment of the National Institute of Oceanography (NIO), the Central Marine Fisheries Research Institute, Central Inland Fisheries Research Institute, Central Institute of Fisheries Technology, Central Institute of Fisheries Education and Central Institute of Fisheries Operatives. He served as the Head of the Zoology Department at University College, Thiruvananthapuram, as the director of the Zoological Laboratory at the University of Madras, as the Officer on Special Duty at the Ministry of Agriculture (India), as the director of the International Indian Ocean Expedition, as the director of the National Institute of Oceanography and as a member of the National Commission on Agriculture. He also served as a member of the Indian National Science Academy and the Kerala State Planning Board and sat on the editorial boards of journals such as Journal of the Zoological Society of India, Indian Journal of Experimental Biology, Indian Journal of Marine Science, and Marine Biology.

Panikkar was an elected fellow of the Indian National Science Academy, Royal Society of Arts, London, National Academy of Sciences, India and Indian Geophysical Union. The Government of India awarded him the fourth highest Indian civilian award of Padma Shri in 1973. He was also a recipient of the Galathea Medal of Denmark (1953) Sir Dorabji Tata Medal from the Zoological Society of India and the Chandrakala Hora Medal by the Indian National Science Academy. Panikkar died on 24 June 1977.

== See also ==
- Central Marine Fisheries Research Institute
- Cochin University of Science and Technology
