= Sudipta Sengupta =

Indian geologist

- Born: 20 August 1946 (age 79); Calcutta, Bengal Presidency, British India
- Education: Jadavpur University
- Alma mater: Jadavpur University
- Awards: Shanti Swarup Bhatnagar Prize for Science and Technology, 1991
- Scientific career
- Fields: Structural geology Precambrian Geology
- Institutions: Jadavpur University
- Doctoral advisor: Subir Kumar Ghosh
- Other academic advisors: Janet Watson; John Ramsay; Hans Ramberg

Sudipta Sengupta (born 20 August 1946) is a professor in structural geology in Jadavpur University, Calcutta, India, and a trained mountaineer. She is one of the first Indian women (along with Aditi Pant) to set foot on Antarctica. She is also popularly known in India for her book Antarctica in Bengali and numerous articles and television interviews on geosciences. She has published extensively in international peer-reviewed journals of structural geology. The Council of Scientific and Industrial Research, the apex agency of the Government of India for scientific research, awarded her the Shanti Swarup Bhatnagar Prize for Science and Technology, one of the highest Indian science awards for her contributions to Earth, Atmosphere, Ocean and Planetary Sciences in 1991.

== Early life ==
Sengupta was the youngest daughter of three, born to Jyoti Ranjan Sengupta and Pushpa Sengupta in Calcutta, India. Her father was a meteorologist and their family spent a lot of time in both India and Nepal.

She says she "comes from the land of Durga. We worship Durga and as a child, I believed that she lived in Kailash. Now, I know that Durga lives in us, in all women."

== Early career ==
Sudipta Sengupta graduated from Jadavpur University with top honors in both the B.Sc. and M.Sc. examinations. She obtained her Ph.D. degree from Jadavpur University in 1972 under the supervision of Dr. Subir Kumar Ghosh. She worked as a geologist in the Geological Survey of India between 1970 and 1973. In 1973, she received the prestigious scholarship of the Royal Commission for the Exhibition of 1851 from U.K. and carried out post-doctoral research work for the next three years at the Imperial College, London. In 1977 she joined the Institute of Geology of Uppsala University, Sweden as a docent for six months and thereafter carried out research as a visiting scientist in connection with the International Geodynamics Project which was supervised by Professor Hans Ramberg. On her return to India in 1979, she joined the Geological Survey of India as a Senior Geologist. In 1982, she joined Jadavpur University as a lecturer and retired as a Professor.

Sengupta recounts that "for the first 15 years of my life, there were hardly any women in the class - in most of the years none." She talks about the fact that the university wasn't prepared to accommodate women during field-trips. Conditions didn't improve until 1996, Sengupta says "In our times, it was terrible. We stayed in dharamshalas and sometimes huts." Sengupta also talks about the fact that in some ways it was better in her days. She went on her PhD studied alone and traveled to remote places with "bad roads and no communication, but never felt unsafe" but that these days she "wouldn't dare to send a girl alone for field work."

== Mountaineering ==
Sudipta Sengupta is an expert mountaineer and was trained in Advanced Mountaineering by Tenzing Norgay in the Himalayan Mountaineering Institute. Tenzing Norgay was one of the first two men to scale Mt Everest in 1953. She has participated in numerous mountaineering expeditions in India and Europe, including an unnamed virgin peak in the Lahaul Region, which they later named Mount Lalana

Sengupta remembers that her field work taught her much. She says "people are the same everywhere. They are basically good and helpful" even if "to seen an Indian girl moving around with a hammer was very new for them."

== Antarctic expedition and research ==
In 1983, Sudipta Sengupta was selected as a member of the Third Indian Expedition to Antarctica and conducted pioneering geological studies in the Schirmacher Hills of East Antarctica. Sudipta and Dr. Aditi Pant, a Marine Biologist were the first women scientist from India to take part in Antarctic Expedition. In 1989 she visited Antarctica for the second time as a member of the Ninth Indian Expedition to Antarctica. Her work in the Schirmacher Hills is of fundamental importance as it became the basis of further research in that area. In the major part of her research in structural geology, Professor Sudipta Sengupta has combined geological field studies with laboratory experiments and theoretical analyses. Apart from doing structural field studies in varied terrain, including the Precambrian structures of Peninsular India, the Scottish Highlands, the Scandinavian Caledonides and East Antarctica.

She talks about her experience in Antarctica and says that the Geology prejudices extended to that land as well. She says "Antarctica was also a male bastion, women scientists weren't allowed there before 1956." She remembers men joking that a woman couldn't go without a beauty parlor in Antarctica. In 1982 she applied to join an Indian Expedition to Antarctica but her application was rejected because she was a woman. She was later taken on expeditions in 1982 and 1989.

On both expeditions, she traveled on ships taking a month to get there. Once they were on land, the crew had to work during blizzards and a Sun that never set. In the days that she went to Antarctica, India only had one base station — Dakshin Gangotri, which now is not in function and is fully submerged in ice. The Maitri station was already up and running by then in Schirmacher Oasis in East Antarctica and is still an active research base.

== Publications and awards ==
Professor Sengupta has published numerous papers in Indian as well as international journals. She has edited a book with contributions by renowned structural geologists and also authored a book on her travels and work in Antarctica which has become a best seller in West Bengal. She was awarded the Bhatnagar Award for excellence in science by the Government of India. She is a Fellow of the Indian National Science Academy. Professor Sengupta also received the National Mineral Award and the Antarctica Award from the Government of India, along with numerous other awards like the Profession and Career Award of the Lady Study Group.

Professor Sengupta was part of a forum titled 'Women in Science and Technology' at the India International Centre in New Delhi. It was acknowledged that Sengupta was a geologist during the 80s, a time when women were discouraged from taking part in any field work. Sengupta was a guest speaker during the event and began by quoting Eleanor Roosevelt: "The future belongs to those who believe in the beauty of their dreams."

== See also ==
- Kshitindramohan Naha
- Timeline of women in science
