= Ved Prakash Kamboj =

Indian scientist

Ved Prakash Kamboj (1937 – 21 November 2023) was an Indian endocrinologist who was president of the National Science Academy of India (NASc; 2005–2006) and director, CDRI and CSIR Emeritus Scientist, Central Drug Research Institute (CDRI).

== Background and education ==
Ved Prakash was born in a Punjabi family of Lamba Pind village, Jullundur, in the Punjab Province of British India, on 1 April 1937. He received his basic education from Jullundur city. He obtained his B.Sc (Honours) in 1959, M.Sc. (Honours) in 1960, Ph.D. in 1965 and D.Sc. in 1970, all from Punjab University, Chandigarh. He took advanced training in Reproductive Biology and Contraceptive Technology in 1975 in West Germany, his field of specialisation being Reproductive Biology, Fertility Regulation and Endocrinology.

Kamboj died in Jalandhar, Punjab on 21 November 2023, at the age of 86.

== Scientific career ==
After graduation in 1960, Kamboj joined the Division of Endocrinology, Central Drug Research Institute (CDRI), Lucknow, Uttar Pradesh, India, in 1961 as a research scientist where he later became the Head of the Department of Endocrinology, which position he held until 1981. In 1981, Kamboj was appointed the Deputy Director, Division of Endocrinology of the Central Drug Research Institute which position he held till 1992. In 1992, he took over as Director, Central Drug Research Institute, Lucknow and continued till 1997. From 2005 till 2006, he was the President of the National Academy of Sciences, India (NASI).

== Other assignments ==
Kamboj has been the Chairman of Review Committee on Genetic Manupulation (RCGM) 2007 and INSA Honorary Scientist 2006. He was also the Chairman of Biotech Consortium India Limited (BCIL) Proteomics for drug discovery 2003.

== Fellowships and memberships ==
In 1989, Kamboj was elected a Fellow of the Indian National Science Academy (INSA). He has been Administrative Member, Indian National Science Academy (INSA) Council in 1998, 1999, 2007 and 2008–2010 and Member, Indian National Science Academy (INSA) Sec. Committee, 1991-192, 2003–2005, and 2004–2006, and 2007.

== Awards and honors ==
Kamboj has won many distinctions and awards including Ranbaxy Research award 1992 in Medical Sciences. On 12 January 2000, he was also awarded the Vigyan Gaurav Award the Council of Science & Technology (CST), a division of the Government of Uttar Pradesh, for his contributions to medicine. Kamboj also holds honours like F.N.A.Sc. and F.N.A..

== Research activities ==
Kamboj has authored or co-authored over 300 research papers and articles appearing in Indian and international journals. He has been instrumental in the development of a nonsteroidal once-a-week contraceptive pill, ormeloxifene. He is the editor/author of several books including Chemistry and Biology of Herbal Medicine which is the proceeding of the conference held in January 1997 at CDRI, Lucknow.
