= National Institute of Oceanography, India =

Facility in Panaji, India

CSIR-National Institute of Oceanography

- Motto: Understanding the seas
- Established: 1 January 1966; 60 years ago
- Research type: Advanced science/technology
- Field of research: Oceanography
- Director: Sunil Kumar Singh
- Location: Dona Paula, Goa, 403 004, India; 15.4561°N 73.8021°E
- Regional centres: Kochi; Mumbai; Visakhapatnam
- Operating agency: CSIR
- Website: www.nio.res.in

Map
- Location within Goa

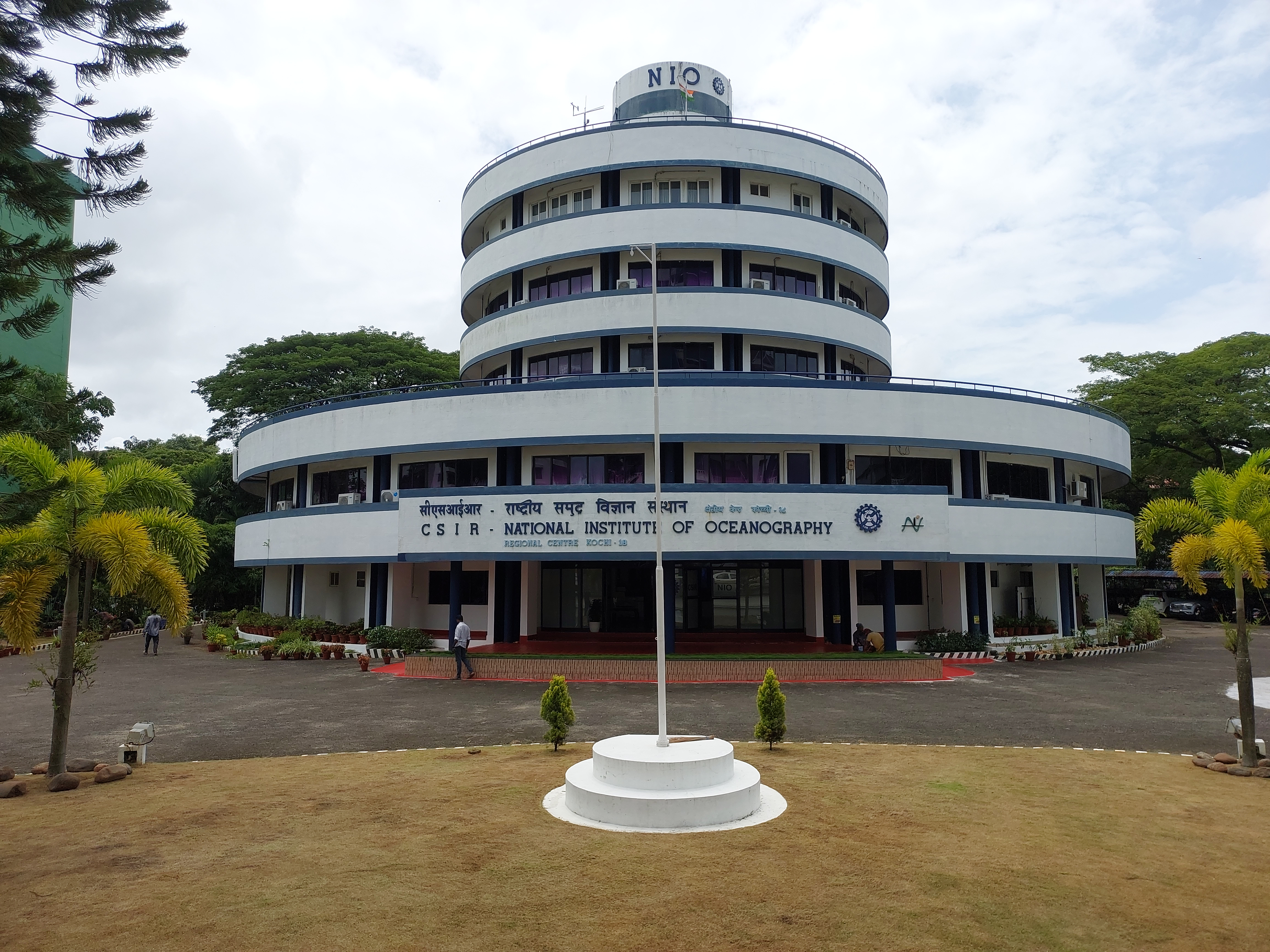
Regional center in Kochi

The National Institute of Oceanography, founded on 1 January 1966 as one of 38 constituent laboratories of the CSIR, is a self-governing research organisation in India that conducts scientific research and studies on the unique oceanographic features of the northern Indian Ocean. It is headquartered in Goa and has regional offices in Kochi, Mumbai, and Visakhapatnam.

== History ==
By the 1950s, oceanographers all over the world realised that, while progress had been made in describing and understanding the observed features of the Atlantic and Pacific Oceans, the Indian Ocean remained largely unexplored. It was critical to address fundamental oceanographic issues related to the northern Indian Ocean's monsoonal cycles, chemical properties of the water column, abundance and distribution of food resources such as fish productivity, and understanding the geology of the Indian Ocean through sea bed mapping and sampling.

These are important not only to the global community of researchers, but also to the large population that lives in the countries surrounding the Indian Ocean in general, and the North Indian Ocean in particular. As a result, the international community of oceanographers organised the International Indian Ocean Expedition (IIOE) from 1959 to 1965 to describe and understand the basic features of the Indian Ocean. This expedition was enthusiastically supported by the Government of India. As the IIOE approached its conclusion, the government decided that the Indians who had participated in the expedition needed an institution where they could build on the oceanographic research skills they had learned during the expedition. The National Institute of Oceanography (NIO) was founded as a result of these considerations. Dr. N.K. Panikkar, Padma Shri, was appointed director of this institute, a position he held until his retirement in May 1973.

Today, the institute employs approximately 170 scientists (sanctioned strength is 200), 120 of whom hold Ph.D.'s, 210 technical and support staff, and 120 administrative staff. The faculty and staff are spread across four campuses: Goa, Mumbai, Kochi, and Visakhapatnam. The main campus is in Dona Paula, Goa, where approximately 80% of the employees work.

== Research contribution ==
A project on polymetallic nodules, which has been funded by the Government of India for over 25 years, is an example of the institute's dual role. By the late 1970s, the government had determined that the country's mineral resources of strategic importance needed to be expanded. NIO was tasked with exploring the oceans for this purpose. NIO recovered polymetallic nodules from a depth of 4,800 meters in the western Indian Ocean on 26 January 1981, using its first research vessel, RV Gaveshani, which was purchased in 1976.

Subsequently, work by NIO researchers helped India to gain the status of "Pioneer Investor" from the International Sea Bed Authority. While this research was aimed at placing the country in a strategically enhanced position, it also provided the institute an opportunity to study the marine geology and geophysics of the Indian Ocean. Some of the issues they addressed are the following: Evolution of the Indian tectonic plates and its implications; determination of the time when the Himalayas started rising leading to monsoonal climate of the Indian subcontinent; nature of mid-ocean ridges (where new crusts form); characteristics of marine sedimentary facies; the role of rivers on the Indian subcontinent in marine sediment budget and paleoclimatic evolution as archived in the sediment cores.

During the first decade and a half of its founding, besides developing its main campus at Goa, a major project taken up by the institute was organising the first Indian Expedition to Antarctica in 1981. This project, together with exploration for polymetallic nodules, established close ties between NIO and the then Department of Ocean Development and subsequently the Ministry of Earth Sciences, Government of India. These ties helped the institute to grow while the government expanded the infrastructure for ocean research, technology and services in the country.

Since the early 1980s, an important theme for basic research in the institute has been, and continues to be, understanding oceanographic implications of the special characteristics of the North Indian basin, which has some unique features: the basin is strictly tropical, with the Asian landmass restricting it south of about 25 degrees N; it is a relatively small basin when compared to the North/South Atlantic/Pacific and even the South Indian Ocean and, of course, there is the seasonality imposed by the monsoons. In the figure above red areas represent areas with elevation of a few kilometers. The presence of the Tibetan Plateau and the Himalayas influences the monsoons.

NIO's scientists have made handsome contributions to understanding the implications of these special features through observations and analyses. The former have included ship-based observations, time-series data collected with moored instruments and satellite data. ORV Sagar Kanya, which was acquired by the Government of India for use by oceanographic research institutions in India, has been playing a major role in these observations.

As noted earlier, an important theme of research at NIO has been understanding the oceanography of the North Indian Ocean – a tropical and small basin driven by strongly seasonal winds. The uppermost 200 m (oceans are on average about 4000 m deep) form the most active portion of the ocean. Here, major currents are forced by winds, and primary producers (microscopic plants that drift with currents) set the stage for intricate interactions that go across the traditional boundaries between disciplines, leading to a new discipline, biogeochemistry of the oceans. Some of NIO's most cited research contributions have been about two aspects of the upper layer: its circulation and biogeochemistry. Currents in this layer are driven by winds. As these are periodic over the North Indian Ocean, so are the currents, in striking contrast to other tropical regions of the world. The link between the winds and currents, however, is rather intricate. NIO researchers played a leading role in defining the nature of seasonality in the currents over the basin in general, and along the coast of India in particular. Subsequent analysis and model studies showed that the circulation of the North Indian Ocean needs to be looked at holistically across the basin because the winds at a location influence not only the local current, but affect the current at remote locations at a later time owing to the propagation of large-scale waves. For example, it is now known that the winds along the Indian east coast significantly affect the seasonal cycle of the current off the Indian west coast.

By restricting the North Indian Ocean to south of 25° N, the Asian landmass prevents the basin from having access to the sub-tropical convergence zone, a region that usually occurs at a latitude of about 40° and is an important supplier of oxygen to the ocean. Not having access to such a regime, the North Indian Ocean is starved of oxygen. Another reason why oxygen is low is the consequence of high concentration of the primary producers of the region. When these plants and Zooplankton that feed on them die and sink they get microbially degraded, thus consuming oxygen. NIO researchers have played a major role in answering critical questions concerning the processes that go on in this basin with lower than normal oxygen levels. Some of the questions that have been addressed are the following: Does the monsoon cycle lead to other seasonal cycles, such as that of biological production and flux of sinking particles? What are the special features of biogeochemistry of the ocean regime with low oxygen? How do the biogeochemical processes (denitrification, for example) that characterize this system work? What are the physical processes that sustain high productivity in the region? How does the monsoon cycle influence temporal evolution of ecosystems in the region?

The research contributions (journal publications, reports, books, etc.) from the institute that provide details about the contributions mentioned above are available from the NIO website, www.nio.org.

== Intellectual property ==
NIO possesses about 50 patents, 60% of which are related to marine biotechnology research. Organisms in the marine environment carry molecules that could be useful in the development of new drugs and other healthcare products. This is a new area of study for NIO researchers. Their research has resulted in research papers and intellectual property for the institute.

Marine instrumentation is another area of research for which the institute has received patents. The Maya AUV is an autonomous underwater vehicle (AUV) developed by the institute.

== Services ==
NIO researchers have undertaken a number of projects in service of the industry in India. One of the first projects taken up by NIO on acquiring its research vessel RV Gaveshani was demarcation of a pipeline for carrying oil from India's first offshore oil field at Mumbai High Field. This project was undertaken at the request of India's public sector organisation, the Oil and Natural Gas Corporation (ONGC). Since then, NIO has carried out a number of projects for India's public sector undertakings and private enterprises. The list of NIO's clientele includes major petroleum companies and ports. NIO's services have been used in the development of coastal areas by Bharuch Eco-Aqua Infrastructure Ltd., Ankleshwar, and Coastal Marine Construction & Engineering Ltd., Mumbai. NIO's services have also been sought by central and state governments. Sponsored and consultancy projects taken up by NIO include Environmental impact Assessment (EIA), Coastal Zone Management, Resource Surveys, Biofouling & Corrosion studies, and development of marine instruments.

A problem that has been worrying governments around the world during recent years is the transfer of organisms from one port to another located far away owing to transfer of water used by ships for ballast. Such transfer has been shown to lead sometimes to uncontrolled growth of organisms alien to the local Ecology, which can then wipe out local fisheries. NIO scientists have played a major role in spreading awareness of the problem in India. In recognition of their efforts, the Directorate General of Shipping, Government of India, has sought NIO's help to develop plans for ballast water management in major Indian ports.

== Facilities for research ==
The NIO Data Centre (NIODC) acquires, processes, formats and stores data generated by the institute (from about 1000 cruises during 1973 to 2009) in a database for easy and efficient retrieval and supply to end users.

The library of the institute has a collection of over 35,000 books and bound volumes of journals is almost certainly the largest such collection in the country in the field of oceanography. Besides the print collection, the library has on-line access to over 3,000 journals either by direct subscription or as a part of a consortium. Participation of the library in international programmes has made this library a source of information about Indian oceanographic studies for the rest of the world and also to network with other, larger libraries to access documents not available in its holdings.

Research at the institute is supported by a large number of well-equipped laboratories on its campuses and by the seagoing capability offered by its ships. To support its multi-disciplinary ocean research programmes, the institute plans to maintain a fleet of three research vessels. The smallest of these is the 23 m long coastal research vessel CRV Sagar Sukti. The recently acquired 56.5 m long RV Sindhu Sankalp serves primarily on the continental margins, but it is capable of open-sea voyages. NIO's 80 m long research vessel RV Sindhu Sadhana, which will be capable of full open-sea studies, was constructed at the ABG Shipyard, Surat. It was joined the institute during 2011–12.

The institute has, over time, developed the capability of deploying and retrieving instruments hoisted over moorings in depths from 5 to 5,000 m. These instruments record time-series data during the period of deployment, which can be as long as two years.

== Opportunities to pursue research and doctoral studies ==
To support its varied activities, NIO uses the services of limited-tenure staff, including doctoral students, project assistants and post-doctoral fellows. Their numbers have grown significantly with the growth in research programmes. The largest increase has been in the number of project assistants since CSIR introduced the "Project Assistant Scheme" to tap the services of fresh graduates for enhancing the productivity of its institutions. Hired regularly through walk-in interviews, the fresh graduates are permitted by this scheme to gain hands-on exposure to oceanographic research. The graduates also have the option of becoming doctoral students through the Senior Research Fellow scheme of the Human Resource Development Group (HRDG) of CSIR. A number of universities have recognized NIO as a centre for doctoral research and about 50 scientists from amongst its staff are at present recognized by these universities as doctoral research guides. With the establishment of the Academy of Scientific and Innovative Research (AcSIR), CSIR's institutions are poised to take major initiatives in advanced education in the country. NIO's Research Council has recommended that the institute take steps to start a school of oceanography as early as possible to address the problem of shortage of advanced manpower in ocean sciences in the country. The number of Junior Research Fellows, qualified through NET (i.e., the National Eligibility Test, conducted by CSIR), Senior Research Fellows (selected by HRDG, CSIR) and Project Assistants who are enrolled for Ph.D. in the institute is now 80. Accommodation to doctoral students is usually provided on the institute's residential campus.
