= Kshitindramohan Naha =

Indian geologist

- Born: 2 January 1932; Comilla, Bengal, British India
- Died: 24 May 1996 (aged 64); Kolkata, West Bengal, India
- Education: Presidency College, Kolkata; Rajabazar Science College; University of Calcutta; University of California, Berkeley La Trobe University
- Known for: Studies on Precambrian geology
- Awards: 1958 Asiatic Society S. L. Biswas Medal; 1970 National Mineral Award; 1972 Shanti Swarup Bhatnagar Prize
- Scientific career
- Fields: Precambrian geology; Structural geology
- Workplaces: University of Calcutta; IIT Kharagpur
- Doctoral advisor: Santosh Kumar Ray

Kshitindramohan Naha (2 January 1932 – 24 May 1996) was an Indian geologist and a professor and CSIR Emeritus scientist at the Indian Institute of Technology, Kharagpur. He was known for his studies on structural geology of Precambrian era and was an elected fellow of the Indian National Science Academy, and the Indian Academy of Sciences. The Council of Scientific and Industrial Research, the apex agency of the Government of India for scientific research, awarded him the Shanti Swarup Bhatnagar Prize for Science and Technology, one of the highest Indian science awards for his contributions to Earth, Atmosphere, Ocean and Planetary Sciences in 1972.

== Biography ==
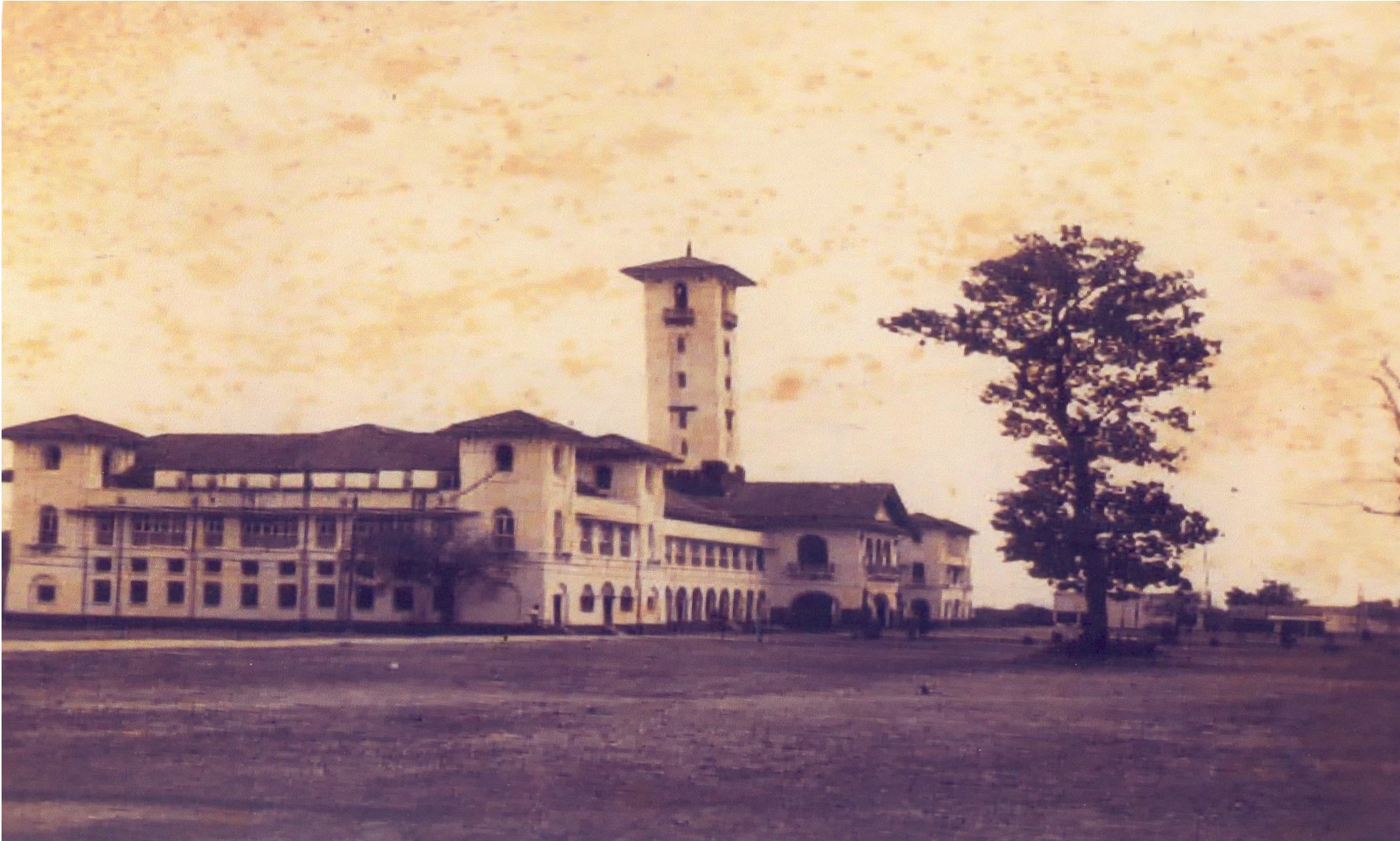
The Hijli Detention Camp (photographed in 1951) served as IIT Kharagpur's first academic building

Born on 2 January 1932 in Comilla, in the Bengal region of British India (presently in Bangladesh), Kshitindramohan Naha graduated in science from Presidency College, Kolkata and later completed his master's degree from the Rajabazar Science College where he continued at the same institution as a research scholar under the guidance of Santosh Kumar Ray. In 1958, he moved to the Indian Institute of Technology, Kharagpur as a member of faculty of the department of geology and geophysics and it was during his service there, he received the degree of Doctor of Science from the University of Calcutta in 1959. He rose in ranks at IIT Kharagapur and when he superannuated from service in 1992, he was holding the post of a professor. During this period, he had two stints abroad as a visiting professor at the University of California, Berkeley (1968) and La Trobe University (1975–76). Post retirement, he served as a CSIR Emeritus scientist of the institute till his death on 24 May 1996, at the age of 64.

== Legacy ==
Naha was known to have made extensive studies on the structural geology of Precambrian era and was credited with compiling an integrated geological history of Precambrian rocks in Ghatsila in Singhbhum of Bihar and in Simla region. Through his studies, he estimated the time of formation and kinematic significance of deformation lamellae in quartz. Migmatites and its architecture, the geometry of reclined folds and the early precambrian terrance of the southern parts of India and central Rajasthan were some of the other foci of his studies. His studies also assisted in developing methodologies for the recognition of angular run conformity in metamorphic terraces as well as the coaxial refolding prior to non- coaxial deformation. His researches are available as several peer-reviewed articles (Note: Please see Selected bibliography section) and he was associated with the Indian Journal of Earth Science, Indian Journal of Geology and Precambrian Research as a member of their editorial boards. He chaired the Indian National Committee on Continental Lithosphere and served as a member of the council of the Indian National Science Academy during 1990–92.

== Awards and honours ==
Naha received the S. L. Biswas Medal of the Asiatic Society in 1958 and the National Mineral Award in 1970. The Council of Scientific and Industrial Research awarded him the Shanti Swarup Bhatnagar Prize, one of the highest Indian science awards, in 1972. The Indian National Science Academy elected him as their fellow in 1977 and he became an elected fellow of Indian Academy of Sciences in 1983. He was also a fellow of the Mining and Metallurgical Society of India and the Geological Society of India. He delivered several award orations which included Professor K. P. Rode Memorial Lecture of the Indian Science Congress (1992), Professor H. C. Dasgupta Memorial Lecture of the Geological, Mining and Metallurgical Society of India (1992) and Dr. S. Balakrishna Memorial Lecture of the Andhra Pradesh Academy of Sciences (1992). Evolution of Geological Structures in Micro- to Macro-scales, edited by Sudipta Sengupta and published by Springer in 1997 is a festschrift on Subir Kumar Ghosh, another noted geologist and Naha, but the book could be released only after the latter's death. The Indian National Science Academy and the Geological Survey of India have instituted awards, Professor K. Naha Memorial Medal and K. Naha Award respectively, in his honour.

== Selected bibliography ==
- Kshitindramohan Naha (1959). "Time of Formation and Kinematic Significance of Deformation Lamellae in Quart". Journal of Geology. 67 (1) (published January 1959): 120–124. Bibcode:1959JG.....67..120N. doi:10.1086/626564. S2CID 128983650.
- Kshitindramohan Naha (1959). "Steeply Plunging Recumbent Folds". Geological Magazine. 96 (2) (published April 1959): 137–140. Bibcode:1959GeoM...96..137N. doi:10.1017/S0016756800060015. S2CID 129853434.
- Kshitindramohan Naha, Subir Kumar Ghosh (1960). "Archaean Palaeogeography of Eastern and Northern Singhbhum, Eastern India". Geological Magazine. 97 (5) (published October 1960): 436–439. Bibcode:1960GeoM...97..436N. doi:10.1017/S0016756800061781. S2CID 140183934.
- Kshitindramohan Naha (1972). "Structural Geometry and the Time-Relation of Metamorphic Recrystallization to Deformation in the Precambrian Rocks near Simulpal, Eastern India: Discussion". Geological Society of America Bulletin. 83 (7) (published December 1971): 2201–2204. Bibcode:1972GSAB...83.2201N. doi:10.1130/0016-7606(1972)83[2201:sgatto]2.0.co;2.

== See also ==
- Precambrian
- Sudipta Sengupta
