= Abhik Ghosh =

Indian chemist (born 1964)

Abhik Ghosh (Bengali: অভীক ঘোষ)
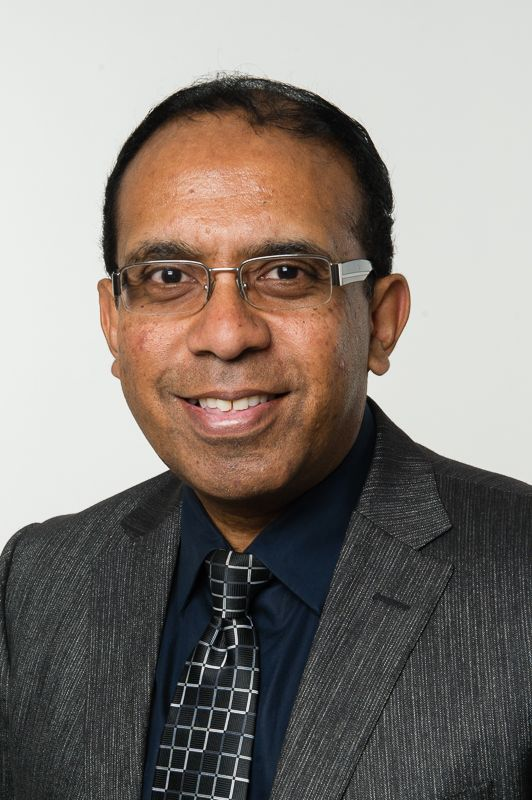
- Ghosh in 2014
- Born: Abhik Ghosh; 12 June 1964; Kolkata, West Bengal, India
- Education: University of Minnesota; Jadavpur University; South Point School; St. Lawrence High School, Kolkata
- Occupations: Professor of chemistry at University of Tromsø; inorganic and materials chemist; science communicator
- Known for: Contributions to: inorganic and bioinorganic chemistry; porphyrin and corrole chemistry; relativistic effects; quadruple bonds; science communication; history of chemistry; LGBT history
- Children: Avroneel Ghosh (son)
- Parent(s): Subir Kumar Ghosh (father); Sheila Ghosh (mother)
- Awards: PROSE Award for Best Textbook in Mathematics and Physical Sciences (2015); Hans Fischer Career Award for lifetime contributions to porphyrin science (2022); Olav Thon Prize for Outstanding Teaching (2025)
- Honours: Member of the European Academy of Sciences (2022–); Member of the Academia Europaea (2023–); Member of the Norwegian Academy of Science and Letters (2025–)

Abhik Ghosh (Bengali: অভীক ঘোষ) is an Indian inorganic chemist and materials scientist and a professor of chemistry at UiT – The Arctic University of Norway in Tromsø, Norway.

== Early life and education ==
Abhik Ghosh was born in Kolkata, West Bengal, India, in 1964. He attended St. Lawrence High School (1971–1981) and South Point High School (1981–1983).

Ghosh obtained a B.Sc. (Honours) in chemistry from Jadavpur University, Kolkata, India, in 1987. Subsequently, he joined the University of Minnesota, where he completed a PhD under the supervision of Professors Paul G. Gassman and Jan Almlöf in 1992. From 1992–1994, he did postdoctoral research with Lawrence Que Jr. During this period, he reported some of the first ab initio and density functional theory calculations on bioinorganic systems. He did a second, brief postdoctoral stint with David Bocian at the University of California Riverside, focusing on the problem diatomic ligand discrimination by heme proteins.

== Career ==
Ghosh moved to UiT – The Arctic University of Norway in 1996 as Associate Professor, rising to Professor in 2000. He has held several secondary affiliations: Senior Fellow of the San Diego Supercomputer Center at the University of California San Diego (1997–2004), Outstanding Younger Researcher awardee of the Research Council of Norway (2004–2010), a co-principal investigator at the national center of excellence Centre for Theoretical and Computational Chemistry (2007–2017), Visiting Professor at the University of Auckland, New Zealand, on many occasions (2006–2016), and Visiting Professor at the University of Rome Tor Vergata (2024–2025). He has authored or coauthored over 300 scientific papers, which have been cited nearly 14,000 times with an h-index of 68 (according to Google Scholar). He received a number awards, including the Olav Thon Prize for Outstanding Teaching (2025) and the Hans Fischer Career Award for Lifetime Contributions to Porphyrin Chemistry. He is an elected member of the Norwegian Academy of Science and Letters, the Norwegian Academy of Technological Sciences, the Academia Borealis, the European Academy of Sciences, and the Academia Europaea.

Ghosh has edited two books, namely The Smallest Biomolecules: Diatomics and their Interactions with Heme Proteins (Elsevier, 2008), a monograph on the subject, and Letters to a Young Chemist (Wiley, 2011), a popular science book on careers in chemistry research. In 2014, he coauthored the text Arrow Pushing in Inorganic Chemistry: A Logical Approach to the Chemistry of the Main Group Elements (Wiley), which won the 2015 Prose Award for 'best textbook in the Physical Sciences and Mathematics'.

== Research ==
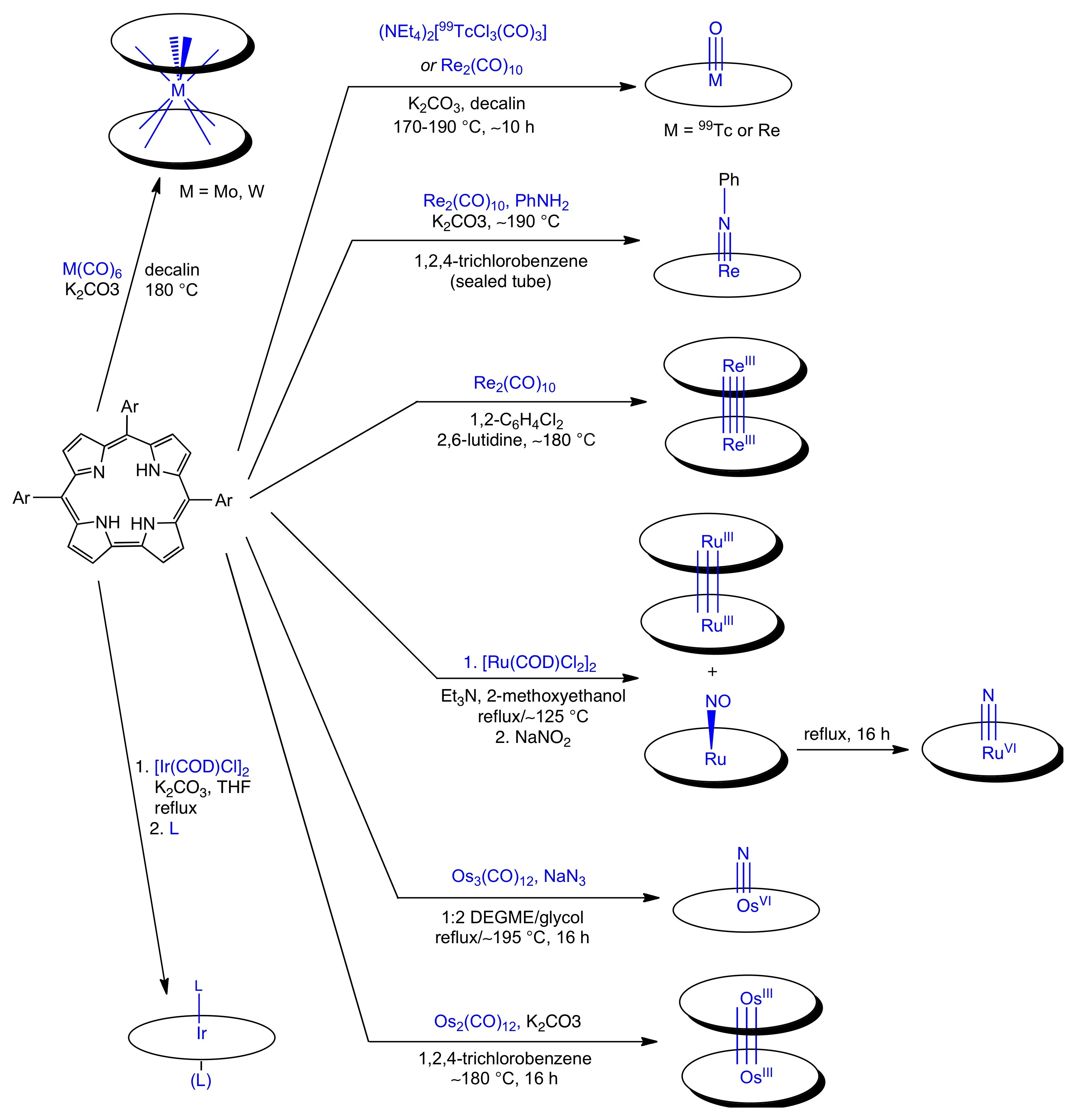
Selected routes to 4d and 5d metallocorroles (ref 19).

Ghosh is known primarily for his research on porphyrins and porphyrin analogues.

Computational bioinorganic chemistry. In the 1990s, Ghosh reported some of the earliest large-scale ab initio and density functional theory calculations on porphyrins and other bioinorganic systems. In particular, he worked on the problem of diatomic ligand discrimination by heme proteins, arguing against the then-prevalent steric model and emphasizing the key role of hydrogen bonding in the distal pocket.

Transition metal spin state energetics. In the 1990s, Ghosh showed that common exchange-correlation functionals yield highly divergent results on the energetics of low-energy spin states of transition metal complexes. He showed that classic pure functionals tend to unduly favor lower-spin states, while hybrid functionals such as B3LYP err in the other ditrection, favoring higher-spin states. Subsequently, he showed that GGA functionals based on the OPTX exchange functional often provide a good solution to the problem, as does B3LYP* (with 15% exact exchange).

Noninnocent ligands. Ghosh has made numerous studies of the phenomenon of ligand noninnocence, particularly as it pertains to transition metal corrole derivatives. He has also used multiconfigurational ab initio calculations to tackle the longstanding question of local oxidation states in transition metal nitrosyls.

Heavy element chemistry. Since 2010, Ghosh has developed the field of heavy element coordination chemistry of corroles, focusing on 4d or 5d transition metal derivatives. He reported some of the first examples of ^{99}Tc, rhenium, osmium, platinum, and gold corroles. A number of these complexes exhibit near-IR phosphorescence and have found applications as photosensitizers in oxygen sensing, photodynamic therapy, anddye-sensitized solar cells.

Low-barrier hydrogen bonds and tautomerism. Early in his career, Ghosh used X-ray photoelectron spectroscopy (XPS) to study short-strong hydrogen bonds in porphyrin-type molecules. Subsequently, he reported the first example of a stable cis tautomer of a free-base porphyrin in the form of a termolecular hydrogen-bonded complex, ultimately formulating a general approach to synthesizing such species.

Miscellaneous. Ghosh has contributed significantly to a number of other problems in physical organic and physical inorganic chemistry, including transition metal complexes with unusually low and high coordination numbers, stereochemistry of sandwich compounds, metal-metal quadruple bonds and quintuple bonds, transition metal carbides, low-valent main-group species, electronic consequences of scandide contraction, and the perfluoro cage effect.

== Science communication ==
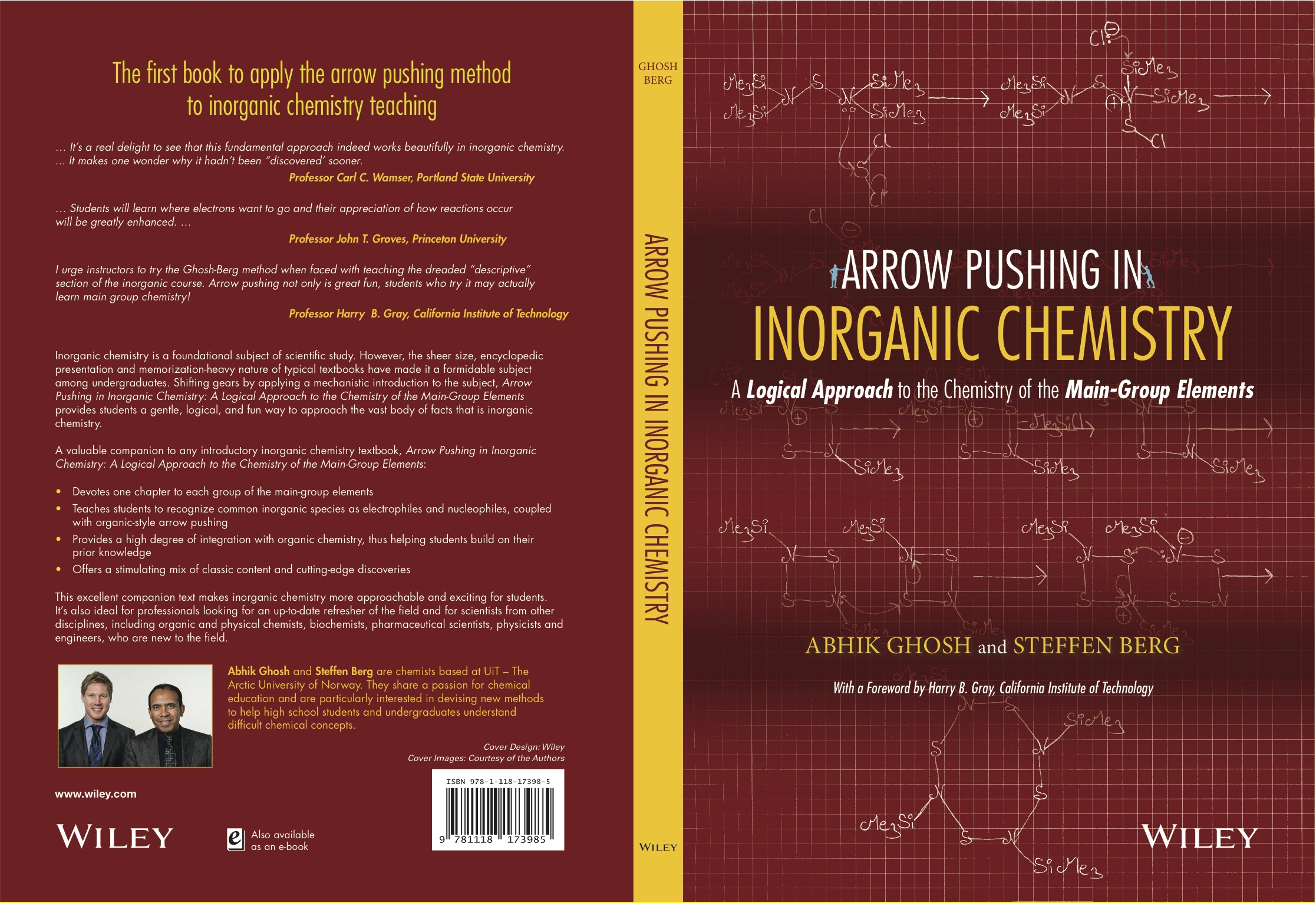
Cover of Arrow Pushing in Inorganic Chemistry; design by the authors.

In collaboration with linguist Paul Kiparsky, Ghosh has written about the possible influence of Pāṇini's Sanskrit grammar, in particular the periodic Sanskrit alphabet (the Shiva sutras), on Mendeleev's conception of the periodic table, a potentially important, new insight into the history of the periodic table. Ghosh has also published popular articles on arrow pushing, on the occasion of the 100th anniversary of its first use by Sir Robert Robinson, and on the impact of relativity in chemistry, among many others.

As a queer chemist, Ghosh has been involved in a variety of diversity initiatives. The 2011 book Letters to a Young Chemist with a young woman as the protagonist and several contributions by leading female scientists has gone through numerous reprints and remains a bestseller. In 2020–2021, Ghosh published two biographical essays on the late Martin Gouterman, a noted porphyrin chemist and one of the first openly gay/LGBT scientists, drawing a parallel with astronomer and gay rights activist Frank Kameny (see LGBT history for a more general discussion). Subsequently, he co-edited a Virtual Issue on “Out in Inorganic Chemistry: A Celebration of LGBTQIAPN+ Inorganic Chemists” highlighting queer authors in Inorganic Chemistry and other American Chemical Society journals.
