= National Centre for Polar and Ocean Research =

Indian research and development institution

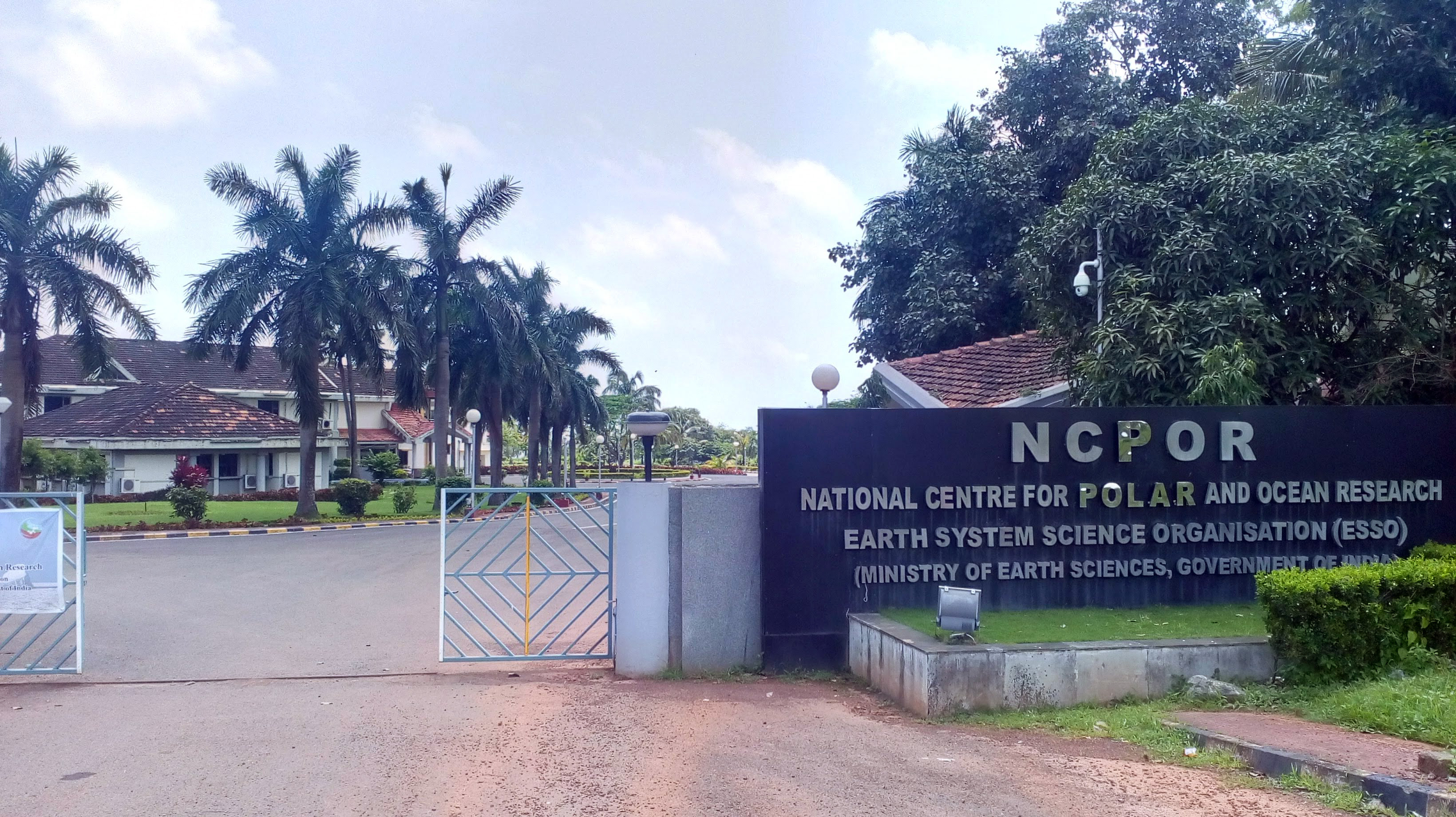
- Main Entrance of NCPOR
- Abbreviation: NCPOR
- Formation: May 25, 1998; 28 years ago
- Headquarters: Vasco da Gama, Goa
- Coordinates: 15.397°N 73.793°E
- Region served: India
- Director: Dr. Thamban Meloth
- Main organ: Governing Council
- Budget: ₹1,897 crore (US$200 million) (2021 - 2022)
- Website: Official website

The National Centre for Polar and Ocean Research (NCPOR) is an Indian research and development institution, situated in Vasco da Gama, Goa.

== History ==
It is an autonomous institution of the Department of the Ministry of Earth Sciences, Government of India which is responsible for administering the Indian Antarctic Programme and maintains the Indian government's Antarctic research stations, Bharati and Maitri. NCPOR was established originally as NCAOR on 25 May 1998, with Dr. Prem Chand Pandey as the founding director.

NCPOR is known for its participation in global experiments, hosting of international conferences and in the leadership of international committees concerned with Antarctic science. The chairman of NCPOR is Dr. M. Ravichandran who is also Secretary of the Ministry of Earth Sciences since 2021.Year-round maintenance of the two Indian stations (Maitri & Bharati) in Antarctica is the primary responsibility of the Centre. Maitri (1989) and Bharati (2011) were established, for carrying out research by the Indian scientists in all disciplines of polar research. These stations have been provided with comfortable living accommodations, state of the art laboratories and well-equipped library and communication systems.

[2] The director of NCPOR is Dr. Thamban Meloth.[11]

NCPOR complex is home to a special low-temperature laboratory and is setting up a National Antarctic Data Centre and a Polar Museum.

The main duties of the NCPOR include:

- storing ice core samples, from Antarctica and the Himalayas.
- operating the Himadri and IndARC Arctic research stations in Svalbard, Norway.
- managing the oceanic research vessel ORV Sagar Kanya, the flagship of India's fleet of oceanographic study vessels. This ship has contributed significantly to India's study of the Arabian Sea, the Bay of Bengal, and the Indian Ocean.
- it supported the KBCAOS, University of Allahabad from the initial stage of establishment up to the final stage of the center as full-fledged faculty centre, in form of a project as per collaborative work with the university.

This centre was previously referred to as the Antarctic Study Centre. It came into existence with joining of Dr. P. C. Pandey as the director on 12 May 1997.

As part of the Indian government’s initiatives for better understanding of glacier –climate inter-relationship and quantify the Himalayan glacier responses towards the climate change, National Centre for Antarctic and Ocean Research (NCAOR), Goa, under the Ministry of Earth Sciences has established a high altitude research station in Himalaya called HIMANSH. HIMANSH is a dedicated Research Station established at Sutri Dhaka, Chandra Basin, Lahaul-Spiti valley of Himachal Pradesh which has an altitude of 4080m amsl. The station was unveiled on Sunday 9th October 2016 and since then the station has made for functioning round the year however for 2016 it have plan to closed during winter (15th November to April 2017).The station is situated above 13500 feet (> 4000 m) at a remote region in Spiti, Himachal Pradesh.
