= Anil Kumar Tyagi =

Indian academic (born 1951)

Dr. Anil Kumar Tyagi
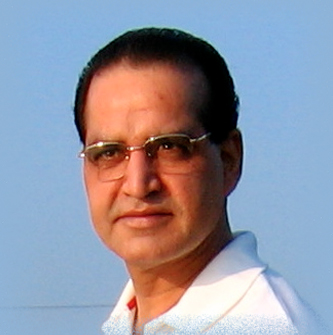
- Born: 2 April 1951 (age 75)
- Education: Bachelor of Science in Botany from University of Meerut, Master of Science degrees in Biochemistry from University of Allahabad, Ph.D. Medical (Biochemistry), 1977 from University of Delhi, Post Doctoral Fellow at National Institutes of Health, 1983
- Awards: J.C. Bose National Fellow; Vigyan Gaurav Samman
- Scientific career
- Fields: Biochemistry and Botany
- Workplaces: University of Delhi, University of Allahabad, University of Meerut and IP University
- Doctoral advisor: WUS Health Centre, University of Delhi South Campus
- Website: www.aniltyagi.org

Anil Kumar Tyagi (born 2 April 1951) is former Vice Chancellor of Guru Gobind Singh Indraprastha University Delhi. Prior to this he was co-ordinator of UGC- SAP Programme and head of Department of Biochemistry at South Campus of Delhi University and was Vice President of the Society of Biological Chemists, India from the year 2004 to 2006.

== Awards and distinctions ==
- J.C. Bose Fellowship (2010).
- Vigyan Gaurav Samman Award from CST, UP Government. (2010).
- Vice President, Society of Biological Chemists (India) from 2004 to 2006.
- Ranbaxy Research Award, 1999.
- Dr. Nitya Anand Endowment Lecture Award of INSA, 1999.
- Shanti Swarup Bhatnagar Prize for Science and Technology in Medical Science, 1995.
- P.S. Sarma memorial award of the Society of Biological Chemists (India), 1993.
- Dr. Kona Sampath Kumar prize of the University of Delhi, 1983.
- Fellow of the National Academy of Sciences, Indian Academy of Science and Indian National Science Academy.
- C.R. Krishnamurthy Memorial Oration Award by CDRI, Lucknow (2007)
- Prof. S.H. Zaidi Oration Award by ITRC, Lucknow (2005)
- Dr. Kona Sampath Kumar prize by the University of Delhi (1983)
- Fellow of the Society for Immunology and Immunopath

== Professional associations and societies ==
- Member of Guha Research Conference
- Life Member of the Society of Biological Chemists
- Life Member of Indian Society of Cell Biology
- Life Member of Association of Microbiologists of India

== Publications ==
- Communalism and ramakatha in historical perspective
- Women Workers In Ancient India
