= IndARC =

IndARC Observatory
- Arctic Research Station
- Location within Svalbard
- Coordinates: 78°57′N 12°01′E
- Country: India
- Established: 23 July 2014

Government
  - Body: National centre for Polar and Ocean Research
- Website: www.ncaor.gov.in/pages/display/398-indarc

IndARC is India's first underwater moored observatory in the Arctic region. It was deployed in 2014 at Kongsfjorden fjord, Svalbard, Norway which is midway between Norway and North Pole. The observatory's research goal is to study the Arctic climate and its influence on the monsoon.

== Development ==
This moored observatory is designed and developed by Earth System Science Organisation (ESSO)-National Centre for Polar and Ocean Research (NCPOR) and ESSO- National Institute of Ocean Technology (NIOT).

== See also ==
  - List of research stations in the Arctic
