= Central Marine Fisheries Research Institute =

Indian fisheries research facility

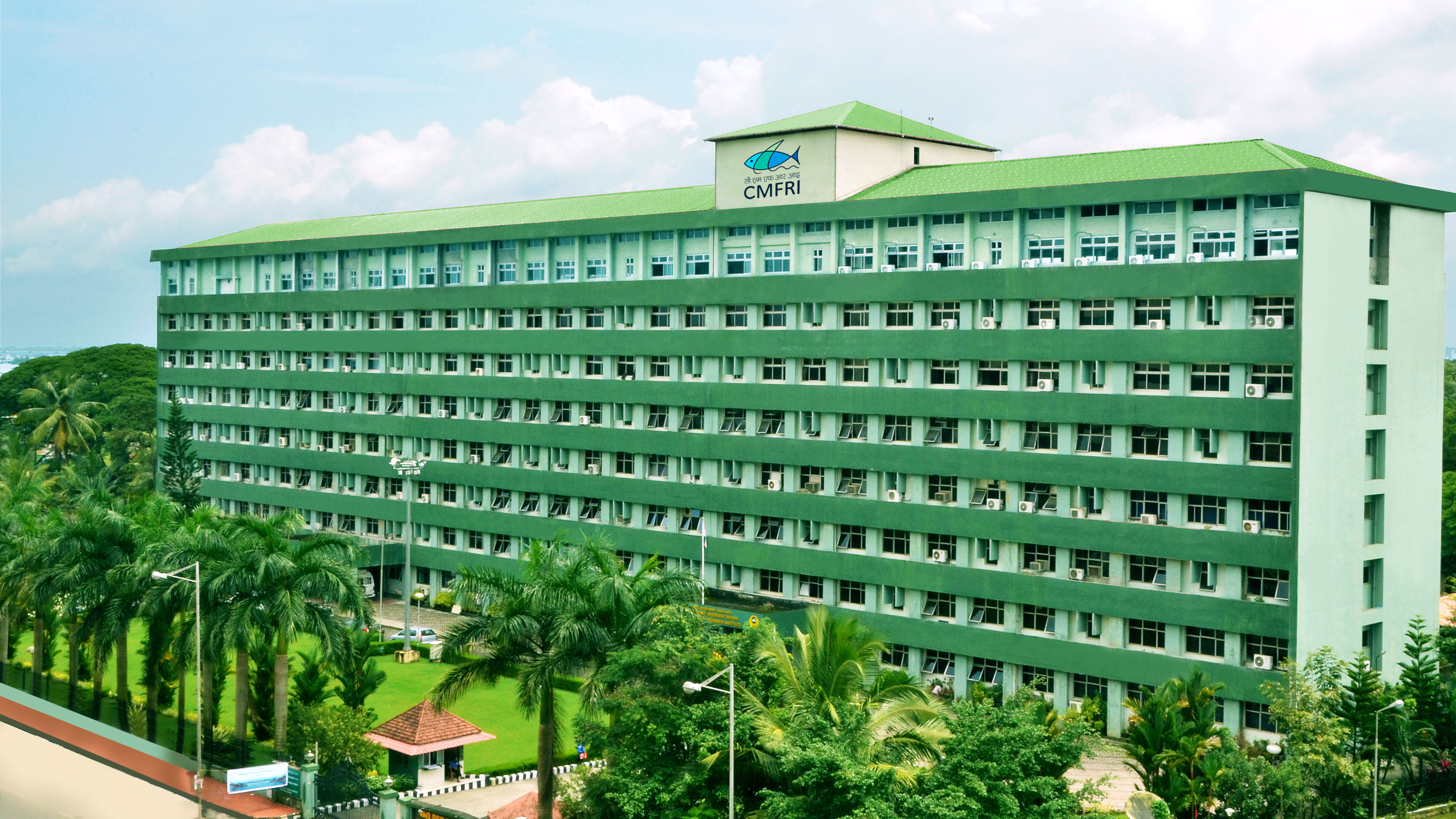
- Central Marine Fisheries Research Institute Headquarters, Kochi, Kerala
- Established: 1947; 79 years ago
- Affiliations: ICAR, Department of Agricultural Research and Education, Ministry of Agriculture and Farmers Welfare, Government of India
- Director: Dr. Grinson George
- Location: Kochi, Kerala, 682018, India; 9°59′18″N 76°16′20″E
- Website: cmfri.org.in

The Central Marine Fisheries Research Institute was established in the government of India on 3 February 1947 under the Ministry of Agriculture and Farmers Welfare and later, in 1967, it joined the Indian Council of Agricultural Research (ICAR) family and emerged as a leading tropical marine fisheries research institute in the world. The Headquarters of the ICAR-CMFRI is located in Kochi, Kerala. Initially the institute focused its research efforts on creating a strong database on marine fisheries sector by developing scientific methodologies for estimating the marine fish landings and effort inputs, taxonomy of marine organisms and the biological aspects of the exploited stocks of finfish and shellfish on which fisheries management were to be based. This focus contributed significantly to development of the marine fisheries sector from a predominantly artisanal, sustenance fishery till the early sixties to that of a complex, multi-gear, multi-species fisheries.

One of the major achievements of ICAR-CMFRI is the development and refinement of a stratified multistage random sampling method for estimation of marine fish landings in the country with a coast line of over 8,000 km (5,000 mi) coastline and landing centers. Institute personnel maintain the National Marine Fisheries Data Centre (NMFDC) with over 9 million catch and effort data records of more than 1000 fished species, from all maritime states of India.

The institute has four regional centres located at Mandapam, Visakhapatnam, Mangalore and Vizhinjam and seven regional stations at Mumbai, Chennai, Calicut, Karwar, Tuticorin, Veraval and Digha. There are also fifteen field centres and 2 KVKs (Ernakulam and Kavaratti, Lakshadweep) under the control of the institute. The nearly fivefold increase in marine fish production and the increasing contribution of marine fisheries to the GDP growth are supported by the robust research efforts and its impact on fisher folk, fish farmers, fisheries policy planners and managers.

== Vision ==
Sustainable marine fisheries through management intervention and enhanced coastal fish production through mariculture for improved coastal livelihoods.

== Mission ==
To develop an information based management system for changing over from open access to regulated regime in marine fisheries, augment coastal fish production through mariculture and sea ranching and restore critical marine habitats.

== Mandate ==
- Monitor and assess the marine fisheries resources of the Exclusive Economic Zone (EEZ) including the impact of climate and anthropogenic activity and develop sustainable fishery management plans.
- Basic and strategic research in mariculture to enhance production.
- Act as a repository of geo-spatial information on marine fishery resources and habitats.
- Consultancy services; and human resource development through training, education and extension.

== Objectives ==
• Marine Fishery Resource Assessment • Productivity and Production Enhancement through Mariculture • Conservation of Marine Biodiversity • Transfer of Technology, Training and Consultancy

== Major research focus and its impact on marine fisheries sector in India ==
=== Support to strengthen the marine fishery management regime in India ===
Right from its inception, CMFRI has focused on gathering information of the marine fishery resources of India. Through its sustained efforts, a database on fisheries landings and effort statistics has aided the developing effective fisheries management plans with stakeholders participation; proactive measures to ensure regulated and sustainable fisheries and aiding efforts in marine fisheries management realm by preparing policy guideline documents based on the research programmes of the institute. Notably, the National policy on Marine Fisheries (NPMF) 2017 notified by the Ministry of Agriculture and Farmers’ Welfare was developed with wide stakeholders’ consultations by the institute and is a major step towards a framework for a sustainable marine fisheries development model in the country.

Marine fisheries policies for the state of Kerala & Lakshadweep Islands, Karnataka, Goa and Andhra Pradesh are formulated with the reassert and policy inputs from CMFRI scientific expert teams. The institute has also prepared a document entitled Indian Marine Fisheries Code which guides the establishment of a sustainable marine fisheries resources management model for India in accordance with Food and Agriculture Organization (FAO's) Code of Conduct for Responsible Fisheries (CCRF). Other contributions of CMFRI recognized as major inputs for the national level policy making are policy guidance on Fish Aggregating Device (FAD); based on which Government of Karnataka banned an FAD assisted cuttlefish fishery that was contributing to growth and recruitment overfishing of cuttlefishes and leading to loss of livelihoods and income to local fishers, Guidance on National Plan of Action (NPOA) for sharks in India for increasing awareness of the need to ensure their sustainable exploitation and conservation, guideline on temporal and spatial measures of effective Trawl Ban for Government of Kerala, recommendation on Minimum legal size (MLS) of commercially important marine fishes aimed at restricting juvenile fishing for various coastal States (Based on which Govt. of Kerala notified MLS for 58 commercially important species in the Gazette), recommendations on use of technology in agricultural insurance’ to NITI Aayog, Guidelines for the Mariculture Policy in India etc. ICAR-CMFRI also coordinated and provided scientific inputs for India's first Marine Stewardship Council (MSC) certified fishery, for the short-neck clam in the Ashtamudi Lake, Kerala.

=== Estimation of marine fish landings ===
The institute collects Marine Fisheries Statistics for estimating species-wise landings from all along the coast which is released every year as a booklet. CMFRI has coordinated the Marine Fisheries Census of India by Department of Animal Husbandry, Dairying and Fisheries (DADF) during the years 2005, 2010 and 2016. The latest marine fisheries census data (2016) collected by CMFRI contains information from 882263 fisher households in 4057 villages. Details of marine fisherfolk residing in the marine fishing villages of all the 9 maritime states and 2 union territories of India, information regarding the fishing craft and fishing gears from 50 fishing harbours and 1281 fish landing centers in the country and the socio-economics were collected. Software for enabling the data entry into a database was developed in-house. The innovative and time relevant way of data entry of marine fish landings data using electronic tablets at landings centres with web based computer application in the IBM server with Oracle RDBMS for online data entry support has been developed, tested and implemented enabling swift collation and dissemination of vital fish landings statistics on a national basis. The spatial mapping of fishing grounds on a continuous basis, which will help in identifying the seasons of high abundance of spawners/juveniles and in identification of critical fishing grounds where seasonal and spatial closure of trawl fishery can be implemented is facilitated under the various projects operated by the institute. Multi-species biomass dynamic models are being developed to address the multi-species and multi-gear fisheries assessments in India.

=== Integration of satellite technologies into fisheries management ===
To effectively utilize satellite technology for managing marine fisheries sector the institute has joined hands with the Indian Space Research Organization (ISRO) with the aim to identify and forecast Potential Fishing Zones (PFZ). GIS based resource mapping of distribution and abundance of fin fishes and shellfishes off the Indian coast and using the GIS technology for mapping of marine fish landing centres. The CMFRI Special Publication on `Handbook on Application of GIS as a Decision Support Tool in Marine Fisheries’ in Marine Fisheries and the GIS based inventory of 1278 marine fish landing centres of Indian coast prepared by CMFRI, was sought by Indian Navy. The types of fishing activity, seasonality of fishing and the extent of fishing operations from each fishing centres are available in this database.

Identification of seasonal peak spawning grounds and seasonal juvenile abundance grounds, mapping of fishing area for newly targeted and emerging resources such as ‘bull’s eye’ to understand its spatial distribution patterns, trawling footprint analysis and GIS based site selection and mapping of natural seed resources for mariculture are now possible due to the application of this technology. In addition, in collaboration with INCOIS the institute carried out satellite telemetry studies to analyse migratory patterns of tunas in the Indian seas by using pop-up satellite tags.

=== Ecosystem Approach to Fisheries Management (EAFM) ===
CMFRI's initiative in promoting EAFM is based on the fact that the country needs to shift from traditional single species management approach to a more advanced one addressing ecological and human well-being with good governance. An Ecosystem Based Fisheries Management (EBFM) model has been successfully developed for the South-west, northwest, Gulf of Mannar coasts and can be used to facilitate well managed fisheries.

=== Addressing climate change concerns in the marine fisheries sector ===
Climate change is now recognized as one of the greatest long-term challenges to marine ecosystems and fisheries. Under the National Innovations on Climate Resilient Agriculture (NICRA), a network project of Indian Council of Agricultural Research (ICAR), to deal with climate change in marine ecosystem CMFRI has focussed on preparing the marine fisheries sector to minimize the impact of climate change. It is also aimed at addressing the critical knowledge gaps about climate change impacts, improve monitoring and translating the knowledge into active management responses. Relationship between temperature and abundance of resources such as threadfin breams and the effect of projected rise in sea surface temperature due to climate change by modeling the biomass dynamics using a variant of SEAMICE models for the south Kerala region has been done. The carbon foot print, blue carbon potential of mangroves and sea grass and life cycle assessment of fishing operations indicated that fishing operations for Kerala coast had highest emissions during harvest phase followed by post-harvest and pre-harvest phases. Multivendor e-commerce portal and Mobile App, low cost feeds for Integrated Multi-trophic Aquaculture (IMTA) and Participatory mode of coastal vulnerable resource mapping are some other initiatives to improve the adaptive capacity and secure resilience for the stakeholders from adverse impacts of climate change. Through adoption of a number of coastal villages and converting it as "Climate Smart Villages" and organizing awareness programmes and field demonstrations on technologies and practice for climate change adaptation and mitigation, livelihood sustainability enhancement through provision of know- how and do –on alternative income generating activities are some of the other interventions carried out by CMFRI.

==== Mobile app for online fish sale ====
As an adaptation strategy to improve income of fishermen and to help them cope up with adverse climatic events, the ICAR-Central Marine Fisheries Research Institute(CMFRI) developed a multivendor E-commerce website and associated android app (marinefishsales) through the National Innovations on Climate Resilient Agriculture (NICRA) project. The website and mobile app is aimed at helping fish farmers and fishermen to sell their farmed fish and marine catch directly to the customers online and to fetch better income without depending middlemen. Various fishermen SHGs can register as vendors (fishers and farmers) based on their fish products and update their stock availability under pre-approved categories and products, which shall be displayed in the website and associated mobile app. Customers visiting the website or app could place the order and subsequently the registered fisher/farmer shall be notified through email and SMS, upon which the quality products within the pre-assigned time frame shall be delivered, enabling direct product sale between customers and SHGs.

=== Fishery socioeconomics, marketing, trade and fisheries governance ===
Studies on economics of fishery enterprises and socio-economic conditions of fisher folk come under the mandate of the ICAR-CMFRI. Valuation, estimation and analysis of marine fish landings and its economic performance, supply chain management, price behaviour of marine fish varieties, fish consumption patterns, impact of GST on fisheries sector and vulnerability of coastal villages are being estimated annually both at landing centre and retail market levels for different maritime states. An estimation of value of marine fish landings in India, during 2011–2017 indicated an increase of fish landings at landing centre level from ₹24,369 crores in 2011 to ₹52,431 crores in 2017, with an annual increase of 14.5%, while at retail centre level, increased from ₹38,147 crores to ₹78,404 crores with an annual increase of 15.08%. Economic performance of different fishing methods were assessed in different maritime states using the indicators like net operating income, capital productivity (operating ratio), labour productivity, input-output ratio and gross value added. Various communication tools are developed periodically for inculcating the concept of responsible fisheries management in the minds of the fishers.

=== Innovations in mariculture ===
Globally, mariculture is the fastest growing animal food producing sector and an increasing source of protein for human consumption. Envisaged to be the future of Indian marine fisheries mariculture has not yet developed into a major contributor of seafood production in India. However, ICAR – CMFRI remains on the forefront to promote various mariculture activities such as cage fish farming, seaweed farming, bivalve and pearl farming, ornamental fish culture, integrated multi-trophic aquaculture, etc. The Research & Development programme on marine cage farming in India which was initiated by CMFRI with the grants received from the Ministry of Agriculture has been successfully demonstrated technically all along the Indian coast with the financial support of National Fisheries Development Board (NFDB). By year 2018, 1609 cages were installed in different marine locations in India under the technical support and guidance of CMFRI. The continuous refinement of the technology is taking place through various research projects of CMFRI and All India Network Project on Mariculture (AINP-M) funded by the ICAR, Government of India. Considerable research thrust has given in mariculture to develop hatchery technologies, seed production protocols and mass rearing techniques of promising species of marine fish. Culture protocols for eight species of copepods suitable for larval feeding of marine finfishes and raceway system for mass production of phytoplankton for bivalve seed production were developed by mariculture division of CMFRI. The successful seed production of a marine ornamental, camel shrimp, Rhyncocinetes durbanensis was achieved,. The Tribal Sub Plan (TSP) programme of the institute has extended technical support in cage farming to several tribal groups in the states of Gujarat, Maharashtra, Karnataka and Kerala and helped them to attain better livelihood skills and income through fish farming.

==== Hatchery technologies ====
The technologies for the seed production and grow-out culture of cobia (Rachycentron canadum), groupers (Epinephelus coioides) silver pompano (Trachinotus blochii), Indian pompano (Trachinotus mookalee) and pink ear emperor (Lethrinus lentjan) have been developed and demonstrated by the CMFRI, while efforts are on to bring more promising species under farming. In addition, five species of snappers and carangids have been prioritized for developing seed production technology. Hatchery production technology for mussel, edible oyster and 14 varieties of marine ornamentals, including Marcia's anthias, clowns, damsels, hybrids, camel shrimp and cleaner shrimp has been achieved. The indigenously developed Re-Circulatory Aquaculture System (RAS) is also functioning at the institute to boost seed production round the year. The establishment of national brood banks of Cobia and Pompano in Mandapam and Vizhinjam Centres of the institute with funding support of the NFDB is a testimony to the determination of the institute for providing necessary support for hatchery technologies of commercially important food fishes that will enhance their mariculture prospects.

==== Integrated Multi-Trophic Aquaculture, a novel method ====
Integrated Multi-Trophic Aquaculture (IMTA) is the practice which combines appropriate proportions of finfish/shrimp with shell/ herbivorous fish and seaweeds in farming to create balanced systems for environmental and economic stability. The CMFRI has successfully conducted the demonstration of IMTA under participatory mode with fishermen groups by integrating seaweed with cage farming of cobia. It has been proved that in one crop of 45 days the seaweed rafts integrated with cobia cage will give an average yield of 260 kg (570 lb) per raft against a control, which yielded 150 kg (330 lb) per raft.

=== Marine biotechnology ===
Bioprospecting of marine and oceanic resources, through which the institute has produced several nutraceuticals useful for treating life style diseases and dietary supplements from seaweeds has been recognised. The institute has developed and commercialized the nutraceutical products CadalminTM Green Algal extract (CadalminTMGAe) and Antidiabetic extract (CadalminTMADe to combat rheumatic arthritic pains and type-2 diabetes, respectively. Nutraceuticals from seaweeds to combat dyslipidemia and obesity and treat hypo-thyroid have also been developed and products are being out-licensed to pharmaceutical companies. βNodadetect a single tube RT lamp diagnostic for β-Noda virus detection in marine fish of mariculture interest has been developed by the institute. This highly specific, sensitive and rapid method of screening marine broodstock fish ensures certified specific pathogen free eggs and larvae. To understand the population genetic structure of fishery resources in Indian waters specific studies were carried out. The complete mitogenome characterisation of Etroplus suratensis from Vembanad Lake, genetic stock structure investigations in Lutjanus argentimaculatus and Indian oil sardine Sardinella longiceps and bioprospecting for biotic and abiotic stress responsive genes from Crassostrea madrasensis and their characterisation have yielded valuable baseline data,,.

== CMFRI's major contributions to the nation ==
- Estimation of the multispecies multi-gear marine fish landings for more than 1200 species covering 1511 fish landing centres on a GIS platform from the EEZ of India for marine fish stock assessment following the self-developed stratified multi-stage random sampling design and maintaining a National Marine Fishery Resources Database which is generated based on continuous and perpetual field data collection on marine fishery resources over decades,
- Annual estimation of marine fish landings at landing centre and retail market level carried out to work out the contribution of fisheries sector to the agricultural and National GDP,
- ICT initiatives include 'Fish Watch', a web portal for real time landing and market information from the landing centres; 'Choose Wisely' – a sustainability labeling code developed by CMFRI which was adopted by the ITC chain of restaurants all over India serving seafood; m@krishi service supported by TCS in collaboration with CMFRI provided and tested a platform to inform fishermen in Maharashtra on potential fishing zones (PFZ) through mobile phones in local language; Litter atlas an interactive map on litter status of Indian beaches
- National quinquennial census of marine fisher population and infrastructure facilities and estimated value of marine fisheries and fishing fleet economic efficiencies,
- Optimized fishing fleet size of various craft-gear combinations for rational exploitation of marine resources in all maritime states of India
- Monitored biology and health of commercial marine fish stocks (133 stocks) of India. Developed and applied several analytical models to assess the finfish and shellfish stocks in all maritime states for providing Fishery Management Plans and advisories on seasonal fishing bans and potential yields
- Developed hatchery and grow-out technologies for shrimps, pearl oysters, oysters, mussels, clams, ornamental fishes, sea bass, cobia, pompano and groupers (totaling 37 species)
- Established commercial farming of mussels and oysters in coastal areas with an annual production of over 10,000 tonnes benefitting nearly 6000 women self-help groups
- Identified and mapped new and non-conventional deep sea marine resources by vessel based surveys, including abundance maps of oceanic squid resources. The institute has so far described 255 marine species new to science from various groups of fishes
- Used modern biotechnological tools for development of marine nutraceuticals (GMe, GAe, Ade & Ate) for human well-being and functional feeds (Varna &‘Varsha) for mariculture species
- Assessed major marine and island habitats and evaluated their biodiversity; and developed restoration protocols through artificial reef deployment
- CMFRI conducts regular training programmes in fisheries and marine biology. So far, the institute has produced over 300 Masters and 160 Ph.D. degree holders
- Provided science back-up for India’s first eco-labelled (MSC certified) fisheries (short-neck clam) meeting global standards of fisheries management
- Delineated the scientific reasons behind the recent decline in oil sardine fishery along the south-west coast of India, to support formulation of management guidelines to improve the status of the fishery

== Outreach activities ==
The Agricultural Technology Information Centre (ATIC) of CMFRI serves as a ‘single window delivery system’ for the technologies and services developed by the institute. There are two Krishi Vigyan Kendras (KVK) functioning under the institute presently. KVK-Ernakulam has developed and disseminates location specific technological modules and acts as Knowledge and Resource Centre for agriculture, fisheries and allied activities. During the last five years, it has set up many satellite seed production centres of pearl spot, a highly favoured local fish species for culture, with the financial support of the National Fisheries Development Board (NFDB) and also formed two farmer producer's companies – Periyar Valley Spices Farmer Producer Company (PVSFPO) and Pokkali Farmer Producer Company (PFPO) with funding from NABARD to empower farmers in direct marketing. KVK is maintaining strong linkages with the AMTA and line departments to provide technology backstopping for their field level activities. A number of natural and bio based crop production and protection inputs like Nurtislurry, Desi Gomuthra, Vermicompost, Cowdung and tapioca leaf extract based biopesticides have been developed.

The administrative control of Krishi Vigyan Kendra (KVK) at Kavaratti, Lakshadweep Islands has been recently taken up by the institute from the CIARI, Port Blair. The main focus will now be for enhancing farmers’ income and employment opportunities especially for women, through value-added products development and facilitate increased market access for the farmers of Island.

== Academic collaboration and training ==
Collaborations with a number of research and academic organizations inside and outside the country have included the Plymouth Marine Laboratory, UK; Nansen Environmental and Remote Sensing Centre (NERC), Norway; Michigan State University, United States; Rhodes University, South Africa and Commonwealth Scientific and Industrial Research Organization (CSIRO), Australia besides fisheries related institutes and academic universities in the country. Department of Science and Technology and Department of Biotechnology of the Government of India and all the Fisheries Departments of various coastal states in the country are important partners in the institute's bid to promote marine fisheries sector in the country. To disseminate the technologies developed training programmes for various stakeholders such as fisheries officials, fishermen, fish farmers and entrepreneurs in areas such as fisheries governance, fish stock assessment, mariculture, have been provided including a few specialised programmes for member countries of SAARC, African-Asian Rural Development Programme – Ministry of Rural Development, Govt. of India (AARDO) and BOBP. CMFRI is also providing consultancy services in core areas like Fish Aggregating Devices (FADs), Fish Taxonomy, Fish stock assessment, Hatchery protocols, Mariculture technology, Fish Nutrition, Fish Health Management, Environmental Monitoring etc. in accordance with ICAR guidelines. The institute recently launched a programme to train 5000 fishermen in open sea cage farming technologies under NFDB funding. CMFRI has thus emerged as a platform effectively extend the results emanating from its various research programmes to the fishermen community and other stakeholders.

== Way forward ==
Sustainability of the fishery resources is core to a healthy and vibrant marine fisheries sector in India. To grow further, the following focus areas have been identified

- fishery modelling and forecasting
- Green auditing – valuation of marine bio-diversity and ecosystem services
- Nanotechnological approaches in mariculture and environment management.
