= ORV Sagar Kanya =

History

India
- Name: Sagar Kanya
- Owner: National Centre for Polar & Ocean Research (NCPOR)
- Launched: 4 September 1982
- Completed: 1983
- Identification: IMO number: 8123183; MMSI number: 419320000; Callsign: VTJR
- Status: Active as of 2020

General characteristics
- Type: Research vessel
- Tonnage: 4,888 GT; 1,029 NT; 1,554.5 DWT
- Length: 100.34 m (329 ft 2 in)
- Beam: 16.39 m (53 ft 9 in)
- Propulsion: Engine Electric propulsion, 2 x 1,230 kW (1,650 hp)
- Speed: 14.25 knots (26.39 km/h; 16.40 mph)
- Range: 45 days/10,000 nmi (19,000 km; 12,000 mi)

ORV Sagar Kanya is a research vessel owned and operated by India's National Centre for Polar and Ocean Research (NCPOR). The ship has helped in India's studies of the Arabian Sea, the Bay of Bengal, and the Indian Ocean.

The multidisciplinary research vessel was built in Germany in 1983 and delivered in India to the Ministry of Earth Sciences (then Department of Ocean Development). The vessel is an ocean-observing platform equipped with scientific equipment and related facilities.

The vessel was built to the class requirements of Lloyd's Register of Shipping and Indian Register of Shipping. The vessel is fully automatic diesel-electric and equipped with dynamic positioning. In addition to the twin-screw propulsion, two fin rudders and one bow thruster give the vessel enhanced manoeuvring ability.
