= Sunil Kumar Singh (geochemist) =

Indian geochemist

- Born: 16 March 1971 (age 55); India
- Known for: Studies on low temperature elemental and isotope geochemistry
- Awards: 2012 National Geoscience Award; 2016 Shanti Swarup Bhatnagar Prize; 2023 J.C. Bose Fellowship
- Scientific career
- Fields: Geochemistry
- Workplaces: Physical Research Laboratory, National Institute of Oceanography, India

Sunil Kumar Singh (born 1971) is an Indian geochemist, a professor at the Physical Research Laboratory on lien and serving as Director of the National Institute of Oceanography, India since 2017. He is known for his studies on low temperature elemental and isotope geochemistry and his researches are reported to have assisted in widening the understanding of the evolution of the Himalayas and biogeochemical cycling in the Indian Ocean. His studies have been documented in several peer-reviewed articles; (Note: Please see Selected bibliography section) Google Scholar, an online repository of scientific articles, has listed 99 of them respectively.

Singh, born on 16 March 1971, has done his education BSc, MSc(Tech), at Banaras Hindu University and PhD in geology at Physical Research Laboratory and MS University, Vadodara. He is a former Scientific Steering Committee member and the incumbent member of the Data Management Committee of GEOTRACES, an international forum for research on the marine biogeochemical cycles of trace elements and isotopes. As a collaborator, he is associated with the Ganga Corridor program, an initiative of the Indian Institute of Technology, Kanpur and the Department of Science and Technology, India. He was the co-coordinator of Weathering and Erosion session of the 2016 Goldschmidt conference held in Yokohama. He is a recipient of the National Geoscience Award and an elected fellow of the Indian Academy of Sciences, the National Academy of Sciences, India, and the Indian National Science Academy. The Council of Scientific and Industrial Research, the apex agency of the Government of India for scientific research, awarded him the Shanti Swarup Bhatnagar Prize for Science and Technology, one of the highest Indian science awards for his contributions to Earth, Atmosphere, Ocean and Planetary Sciences in 2016. (Note: Long link - please select award year to see details)

== Awards ==
- 2012: National Geoscience Award
- 2014: Eminent Mass spectrometry Award ISMAS
- 2016: Shanti Swarup Bhatnagar Prize
- 2016: Fellow, Indian Academy of Sciences
- 2017: Asian Scientist 100, Asian Scientist
- 2018: Indian National Science Academy (INSA)
- 2019: Doctor of Engineering, NIT Goa
- 2019: Fellow, National Academy of Sciences, India
- 2021: Ocean Science Awards, The Ministry of Earth Sciences
- 2022: Life time Achievement Award, Indian Society of Applied Geochemists (ISAG)
- 2022: Recognised as one among "75 Under 50 Scientists Shaping Today's India" from the Department of Science and Technology, Government of India
- 2023: JC Bose Fellowship, SERB
- 2025: Awarded IGU–Prof. K.R. Ramanathan Memorial Lecture in recognition of outstanding contributions to Earth Sciences

== Selected bibliography ==
- Mishra T.K., and Singh S.K., Water Column Cycling of Cadmium in the North-Eastern and Subtropical Gyre Region of the Indian Ocean, Journal of Geophysical Research – Oceans, 130, e2025JC022817, 2025; https://doi.org/10.1029/2025JC022817
- Malla N. and Singh S.K., Atmospheric deposition, shelf sediment supply, riverine input, and redox conditions control dissolved manganese in the Indian Ocean. Global Biogeochemical Cycles, 39, e2025GB008660, 2025 https://doi.org/10.1029/2025GB008660
- Yadav C., Singh S.K. and Chinni V., Persistent elevated levels of dissolved lead in the Indian Ocean post-leaded gasoline ban: The impact of anthropogenic activities, sediment desorption, and dust storms, Marine Pollution Bulletin 215, 2025: 117874; https://doi.org,10.1016/j.marpolbul.2025.117874.
- Satinder Pal Singh, Sunil Kumar Singh, Vineet Goswami, Ravi Bhushan, Vinai. K. Rai (2012). "Spatial distribution of dissolved neodymium and εNd in the Bay of Bengal: Role of particulate matter and mixing of water masses". Geochimica et Cosmochimica Acta. 94: 38–56. Bibcode:2012GeCoA..94...38S. doi:10.1016/j.gca.2012.07.017.
- Gyana Ranjan Tripathy, Sunil Kumar Singh, Harsh Bhu (2013). "Re-Os isotopes and major and trace element geochemistry of carbonaceous shales, Aravalli Supergroup, India: Impact of post-depositional processes". Chemical Geology. 354: 93–106. Bibcode:2013ChGeo.354...93T. doi:10.1016/j.chemgeo.2013.06.014.
- Venigalla purnachandra Rao, R. Shynu, Sunil Kumar Singh, S.W.A. Naqvi, Pratima M. Kessarkar (2014). "Mineralogy and Sr-Nd isotopes of SPM and sediment from the Mandovi and Zuari estuaries: Influence of weathering and anthropogenic contribution". Estuarine, Coastal and Shelf Science. 156 (1): 103–115. doi:10.1016/j.ecss.2014.07.004.
- Satinder Pal Singh, Sunil Kumar Singh, Ravi Bhushan, Vinai. K. Rai (2015). "Dissolved silicon and its isotopes in the water column of the Bay of Bengal: Internal cycling versus lateral transport". Geochimica et Cosmochimica Acta. 151: 172–191. Bibcode:2015GeCoA.151..172S. doi:10.1016/j.gca.2014.12.019.
- A.K. Sudheer, MY Aslam, M Upadhyay, Ramabadran Rengarajan, Ravi Bhushan, JS Rathore, Sunil Kumar Singh, Sanjeev Kumar (2016). "a". Atmospheric Research. 178. doi:10.1016/j.atmosres.2016.03.026.

== See also ==
- Isotope geochemistry
