= Molecular Microbiology (journal) =

- Discipline: Molecular microbiology
- Language: English
- Edited by: John D. Helmann

Publication details
- History: 1987–present
- Publisher: Wiley-Blackwell
- Frequency: Biweekly
- Impact factor: 3.6 (2022)

Standard abbreviations
- ISO 4: Mol. Microbiol.

Indexing
- CODEN: MOMIEE
- ISSN: 0950-382X (print); 1365-2958 (web)
- LCCN: 87659182
- OCLC no.: 15473109

Links
- Journal homepage; Online access; Online archive

Molecular Microbiology is a bimonthly peer-reviewed scientific journal covering all aspects of molecular microbiology. It was established in 1987 and is published by Wiley-Blackwell. The editor-in-chief is John D. Helmann (Cornell University).

== Abstracting and indexing ==
The journal is abstracted and indexed in:

- Academic Search
- AGRICOLA
- Aquatic Sciences and Fisheries Abstracts
- BIOBASE
- Biochemistry & Biophysics Citation Index
- Biological Abstracts
- BIOSIS Previews
- Biotechnology Citation Index
- CAB HEALTH
- CABDirect
- Chemical Abstracts Service
- CSA Biological Sciences Database
- CSA Environmental Sciences & Pollution Management Database
- CSA Microbiology Databases
- CSA Virology and AIDS Abstracts
- Current Contents/Life Sciences
- EMBASE/Excerpta Medica
- Embiology
- Food Science & Technology Abstracts
- Index Medicus/MEDLINE/PubMed
- InfoTrac
- Neurosciences Abstracts
- Science Citation Index
- VINITI

According to the Journal Citation Reports, the journal has a 2022 impact factor of 3.6.
