= Hans Ramberg =

Norwegian-Swedish geologist (1917–1998)

- Born: 15 April 1917; Trondhjem, Norway
- Died: 7 June 1998 (aged 81); Uppsala, Sweden
- Education: University of Oslo
- Awards: Celsius Medal (1969); Wollaston Medal (1972); Royal Swedish Academy (1973); Arthur L. Day Medal (1976); Arthur Holmes Medal (1983); Björkénska priset (1980)

Hans Ramberg (15 March 1917 – 7 June 1998) was a Norwegian-Swedish geologist. The mineral rambergite was named after him. He was a pioneer in tectonic modelling with a centrifuge.

== Biography ==
He received his PhD from the University of Oslo in 1946. He subsequently worked at the University of Chicago (1948–1961) and at the Geophysical Laboratory of the Carnegie Institution for Science (1952–1955) at the Universidade Federal de Ouro Preto (1960–1961) and for the rest of his career at the University of Uppsala (1961–1982), where he established the Hans Ramberg Laboratory. Together with his assistants and students, he simulated a variety of tectonic models with the centrifuge, which are summarized in his second book: Gravity; deformation and the Earth's crust. Until the end of his career, he was focused on explored the potential of numerical modelling in combination with analogue modelling.

=== Awards ===
In 1967, he was elected a member of the Royal Swedish Academy of Sciences. He was awarded by the Royal Society of Sciences at Uppsala for the Celsius Gold Medal (Celsiusmedaljen i guld) in 1969, by the Geological Society of London the Wollaston Medal in 1972 and for the Grand Prize from the Royal Academy for Natural Sciences in Sweden 1973. He received the Arthur L. Day Medal from the GSA in 1976 as well as the Arthur Holmes Medal awarded by the EGU in 1983. He was awarded the Björkén Prize (Björkénska priset) at Uppsala University in 1980.
