= Biotech Consortium India Limited =

Indian biotechnology company

- BCIL Official Logo
- Abbreviation: BCIL
- Formation: 1990
- Type: Public
- Headquarters: New Delhi, India
- Location: BCIL, Anuvrat Bhawan, Vth Floor, 210, Deen Dayal Upadhay Marg, New Delhi-110002
- Managing Director: Dr. Purnima Sharma
- Parent organisation: Department of Biotechnology, India
- Website: www.biotech.co.in

Biotech Consortium India Limited (BCIL), New Delhi was incorporated as public limited company in 1990 under the Companies Act, 1956. The consortium is promoted by the Department of Biotechnology, Government of India and financed by the All India Financial Institutions and some corporate sectors. BCIL's major functions include the development and transfer of technology for the commercialisation of biotechnology products, project consultancy, biosafety awareness and human resource development.

BCIL has been successfully managing several flagship schemes and programmes of the Department of Biotechnology. Most notable include:

1. Biotechnology Industry Partnership Programme 2. Biotechnology Industrial Training Programme 3. Small Business Innovation Research Initiative
