= List of Indian Bengali scientists =

This is a list of notable Indian Bengali scientists.

List of the Greatest Influential Indian (British Indian Citizen and Indian Citizen) Bengali Scientists, Mathematicians, Engineers, Doctors and Economists

Rank	Image	Name	Family	Field	Legacy and Remarks	Born	Died
1		Sir Acharya Jagadish Chandra Bose	Bengali Hindu family, Bikrampur, Dhaka, Bengal, now Bangladesh (East Bengal)	Physics and Biophysics	One of the Fathers of Radio Science (Wireless Communication/Technology), Father of Modern Science in India, first person in the world to use a Semiconductor Junction to detect Electromagnetic Waves, discoverer of Millimetre Wave (Extremely High Frequency/EHF/MMW), inventor of Crescograph	30 November 1858, Mymensingh, Bengal, now Bangladesh (East Bengal)	23 November 1937, Giridih, Bihar, now Jharkhand
2		Sir Acharya Prafulla Chandra Roy	Bengali Hindu family, Khulna, Bengal, now Bangladesh (East Bengal)	Chemistry	Father of Chemistry in India, discoverer of Mercurous Nitrite	2 August 1861, Khulna, Bengal, now Bangladesh (East Bengal)	16 June 1944, Calcutta, Bengal, now West Bengal
3		Dr. Bidhan Chandra Roy	Bengali Hindu family, Khulna, Bengal, now Bangladesh (East Bengal)	Medicine	National Doctors' Day in India is celebrated every year on July 1 to commemorate his birth anniversary, recipient of Bharat Ratna (1961), Chief Minister of West Bengal (1948-1962)	1 July 1882, Patna, Bengal, now Bihar	1 July 1962, Calcutta, West Bengal
4		Prasanta Chandra Mahalanobis	Bengali Hindu Brahmin family, Bikrampur, Dhaka, Bengal, now Bangladesh (East Bengal)	Statistics	Father of Statistics in India, National Statistics Day in India is celebrated every year on June 29 to commemorate his birth anniversary, introducer of Mahalanobis Distance	29 June 1893, Calcutta, Bengal, now West Bengal	28 June 1972, Calcutta, West Bengal
5		Satyendra Nath Bose	Bengali Hindu family, Nadia, Bengal, now West Bengal	Mathematics and Physics	Best Student of Indian Bengali Physicist Sir Acharya Jagadish Chandra Bose, when he (Satyendra Nath Bose) was a Reader (later made Professor by the recommendation of Albert Einstein) at the University of Dhaka (Bengal, now in Bangladesh/East Bengal), he developed the foundation of the Bose–Einstein Statistics and the theory of the Bose–Einstein Condensate in collaboration with European German Physicist Albert Einstein, although seven (7) Nobel Prizes in Physics were awarded for research related to Bose–Einstein Statistics and Bose–Einstein Condensate, he (Satyendra Nath Bose) himself was not awarded a Nobel Prize in Physics	1 January 1894, Calcutta, Bengal, now West Bengal	4 February 1974, Calcutta, West Bengal
6		Amartya Sen	Bengali Hindu family, Wari, Dhaka, Bengal, now Bangladesh (East Bengal)	Economics	Winner of Nobel Prize (Nobel Memorial Prize) in Economics (1998) for his contribution to Welfare Economics, only Indian (Indian Citizen) to win Nobel Prize (Nobel Memorial Prize) in Economics, recipient of Bharat Ratna (1999)	3 November 1933, Birbhum, Bengal, now West Bengal	-

List of the Greatest Influential Bangladeshi (British Indian Citizen, Pakistani Citizen and Bangladeshi Citizen) Bengali Scientists, Mathematicians, Engineers, Doctors and Economists

Rank	Image	Name	Family	Field	Legacy and Remarks	Born	Died
1		Muhammad Yunus	Bengali Muslim family, Chattogram (Chittagong), Bengal, now Bangladesh (East Bengal)	Economics	Winner of Nobel Peace Prize (2006) for founding the Grameen Bank and pioneering the concepts of microcredit and microfinance in Bangladesh (East Bengal), only Bangladeshi (Bangladeshi Citizen) to win Nobel Prize (Nobel Peace Prize)	28 June 1940, Chittagong (Chattogram), Bengal, now Bangladesh (East Bengal)	-

List of the Greatest Influential Bengali Origin Scientists, Mathematicians, Engineers, Doctors and Economists

Rank	Image	Name	Citizenship (Nationality)	Family	Field	Legacy and Remarks	Born	Died
1		Abhijit Banerjee	American (Citizen of United States of America)	Bengali Hindu Brahmin family, Hooghly, West Bengal	Economics	Winner of Nobel Prize (Nobel Memorial Prize) in Economics (2019) for Experimental Approach to Alleviating Global Poverty	21 February 1961, Mumbai, Maharashtra	-
2		Jawed Karim	American (Citizen of United States of America)	Bengali Muslim family, Rural Dhaka, Dhaka, Bangladesh (East Bengal)	Computer Engineering	Co-founder of YouTube, first person in the world to upload a video to YouTube, he designed many of YouTube's core components including YouTube's Real-Time Anti-Fraud System (RTAFS), YouTube is owned by Google, YouTube is the second most visited website in the world after Google Search, Google's (1998) Founders and Owners: Larry Page (American) and Sergey Brin (Russian), YouTube's (2005) Founders: Chad Hurley (American), Steven Chen (Chinese) and Jawed Karim (Bengali)	October 28, 1979, Merseburg, Bezirk Halle, East Germany, now Germany	-

== A ==
- Abhijit Mukherjee
- Abhik Ghosh
- Aditi Sen De
- Ajoy Ghatak
- Alok Krishna Gupta
- Amal Kumar Raychaudhuri
- Amar Bose
- Amar Gupta
- Ambarish Ghosh
- Amiya Charan Banerjee
- Amitabha Mukhopadhyay
- Amitava Datta
- Amitava Das
- Amitava Raychaudhuri
- Anadish Pal
- Anil Kumar Bhattacharyya
- Anil Kumar Das
- Anil Kumar Mandal
- Animesh Chakravorty
- Aninda Sinha
- Anirban Basu
- Anirvan Ghosh
- Archana Bhattacharyya
- Arnab Rai Choudhuri
- Arun Kumar Sharma
- Asok Kumar Barua
- Ashoke Sen
- Asoke Nath Mitra
- Asima Chatterjee

== B ==
- Basanti Dulal Nagchaudhuri
- Basiswar Sen
- Basudeb DasSarma
- Bibha Chowdhuri
- Bidyut Baran Chaudhuri
- Bidyendu Mohan Deb
- Bikas Chakrabarti
- Biman Bagchi
- Biraj Mohan Das Gupta
- Birendra Bijoy Biswas
- Biswa Ranjan Nag
- Biswarup Mukhopadhyaya
- Bhupati Mohan Sen

== C ==
- Chitra Dutta
- Chitra Mandal
- Chanchal Kumar Majumdar
- Charusita Chakravarty
- Chinmoy Sankar Dey

== D ==
- Deb Shankar Ray
- Debabrata Goswami
- Debasish Ghose
- Debendra Mohan Bose
- Dibyendu Nandi
- Dilip Mahalanabis
- Dipan Ghosh
- Dipankar Chatterji

== G ==
- Girindrasekhar Bose
- Gopal Chandra Bhattacharya

== H ==
- Harinath De
- Hassan Suhrawardy
- Hiralal Chaudhuri

== I ==
- Ipsita Biswas
- Indira Chakravarty
- Indira Nath
- Indrani Bose
- Indumadhab Mallick

== J ==
- Jamini Bhushan Ray
- Jagdish Chandra Bose
- Jayanta Bandyopadhyay
- Jitendra Nath Goswami
- Jnan Chandra Ghosh
- Jayanta Haldar

== K ==
- K.C. Das
- K. S. Dasgupta
- Kamanio Chattopadhyay
- Kanny Lall Dey
- Kaushik Basu
- Kshitindra Mohan Chakravarty
- Kshitindramohan Naha
- Kishori Mohan Bandyopadhyay
- Koustav Kumar Mondal

== L ==
- Lilabati Bhattacharjee
- Lotika Sarkar

== M ==
- Madhusudan Gupta
- Maharani Chakravorty
- Maitree Bhattacharyya
- Mani Lal Bhaumik
- Manju Ray
- Manoj Majee
- Meenakshi Banerjee
- Meghnad Saha
- Mihir Chowdhury
- Mihir Kumar Bose
- Mitali Mukerji
- Mrinal Datta Chaudhuri
- Monita Chatterjee
- Moumita Dutta
- Mrinal Kumar Das Gupta

== N ==
- N. C. Paul
- Nani Gopal Majumdar
- Nandini Mukherjee
- Nandita Basu
- Narendra Karmarkar
- Nibir Mandal
- Nilratan Sircar

== P ==
- Palash Sarkar
- Partha Sarathi Mukherjee
- Pinaki Majumdar
- Polly Roy
- Prabha Chatterji
- Prabodh Chandra Sengupta
- Pradyut Ghosh
- Prafulla Chandra Ray
- Pran Ranjan Sengupta
- Prasanta Chandra Mahalanobis
- Probir Roy
- Pulak Sengupta
- Purnima Sinha
- Purushottam Chakraborty

== R ==
- Radhanath Sikdar
- Rajdeep Dasgupta
- Rajeshwari Chatterjee
- Ram Chet Chaudhary
- Ramendra Kumar Podder
- Ranajit Chakraborty
- Ranjan Mallik
- Rupamanjari Ghosh

== S ==
- S. A. Hussain
- S. C. Dutta Roy
- S. M. Ullah
- Samir Das
- Sampa Das
- Sankar K. Pal
- Samarendra Nath Biswas
- Samaresh Bhattacharya
- Sanghamitra Bandyopadhyay
- Santanu Bose
- Santanu Chaudhuri
- Sarit Kumar Das
- Sasanka Chandra Bhattacharyya
- Satya Churn Law
- Satyendra Nath Bose
- Shantanu Chowdhury
- Sharmila Bhattacharya
- Shehla Pervin
- Shipra Guha-Mukherjee
- Shireen Akhter
- Siddhartha Mukherjee
- Snehasikta Swarnakar
- Sisir Kumar Mitra
- Siva Brata Bhattacherjee
- Somak Raychaudhury
- Somnath Dasgupta
- Souvik Maiti
- Srikumar Banerjee
- Subhabrata Sen
- Subhash Mukhopadhyay
- Subir Kumar Ghosh
- Subrata Adak
- Subrata Roy
- Sudeshna Sinha
- Sudhansu Datta Majumdar
- Sudipta Sengupta
- Sujoy K. Guha
- Suman Kumar Dhar
- Sunetra Gupta
- Sunil Kumar Manna
- Suniti Devi
- Sunny Sanwar
- Surajit Chandra Sinha
- Surya Ganguli
- Sushanta Kumar Dattagupta
- Susmita Bose
- Suvendra Nath Bhattacharyya
- Swapan Chattopadhyay

== T ==
- Tamal Dey
- Tanusri Saha-Dasgupta
- Tapas Kumar Kundu
- Tista Bagchi

== U ==
- Ujjwal Maulik
- Usha Ranjan Ghatak

== See also ==
- List of Indians
- Lists of scientists
- List of Indian scientists
