= Theranautilus =

Indian healthcare company

Theranautilus Private Limited
- Company type: Private
- Industry: Healthcare, Robotics, Nanotechnology
- Founded: 2020; 5 years ago
- Founder: Ambarish Ghosh; Debayan Dasgupta; Shanmukh Peddi
- Headquarters: Bengaluru, Karnataka, India
- Key people: Ambarish Ghosh; Debayan Dasgupta; Shanmukh Peddi
- Products: Theradrive, Therablaze
- Website: www.theranautilus.com

Theranautilus, is an Indian private, deep-tech, nanotechnology and healthcare company, headquartered in Bangalore, India. The company was established in 2020. The company was initially a lab spin-off from the Indian Institute of Science, Bangalore. Theranautilus's device can be used to guide the nanorobots to their targets deep inside the dentinal tubules. Once the nanorobots reach the bacterial infestation site, they can be remotely activated to deploy their antibacterial mechanism. This novel solution minimizes root canal failure, which currently afflicts up to 14-16% of the millions of root canal treatment procedures performed every year globally. They were awarded the National award under Technology Start-up category by the Government of India. Theranautilus was also ranked amongst the "Top 10 med-tech companies solving real health challenges" by the Board of Innovation Recently, the company demonstrated controlled formation of cement plugs inside dentin tubules by deploying bioceramic laden nanobots. This innovation may alleviate dentine hypersensitivity in patients.
