= Biraj Mohan Das Gupta =

Bengali parasitologist (1889–1945)

Biraj Mohon Dasgupta
- বিরাজ মোহন দাশগুপ্ত
- Born: 1889
- Died: 1945 (aged 55–56); Calcutta, Bengal Presidency, British India
- Occupation: parasitologist

Biraj Mohan Das Gupta or Dasgupta (Bengali: বিরাজ মোহন দাশগুপ্ত, c. 1889 – 1945) was a Bengali parasitologist, known for his discovery, with Robert Knowles, of the Plasmodium species now known as Plasmodium knowlesi.

== Biography ==
After qualifying as a physician, Das Gupta was appointed in 1921 to a position as a researcher and assistant surgeon at the Calcutta School of Tropical Medicine.

At the Calcutta School of Tropical Medicine, in 1931 H. G. M. Campbell detected the Plasmodium species now known as P. knowlesi in a macaque imported from Singapore. Campbell showed his discovery to his supervisor Lionel Everard Napier, who injected the strain into three monkeys, one of which developed symptoms of malaria. Aware of the Protozoological Department's search for a monkey malaria strain, Napier and Campbell gave the infected monkey to Das Gupta, working under Knowles. Das Gupta maintained the Plasmodium species by serial passage in monkeys until Knowles returned from leave. In 1932, Knowles and Das Gupta published their description of the Plasmodiium species and their account of how it could be transmitted from monkey to human by blood passage to three human volunteers. The Plasmodium species was not given a name by Knowles and Das Gupta but was named Plasmodium knowlesi by Sinton and Mulligan in 1932.

Das Gupta was the director of the Calcutta School of Tropical Medicine from 1943 until his death in 1945. He was the School's second Indian director and its first non-Indian-Medical-Service director.

== Selected publications ==
=== Articles ===
- "A Note on some Cultural Phases of Leishmania donovani". Indian Journal of Medical Research. 9 (4): 809–813. 1922.
- with R. Knowles & L. E. Napier: "A Preliminary Note on the Relationship of the Intestinal Protozoa of Man to the Hydrogen Ion Concentration of their Environment". Indian Medical Gazette. 58 (4): 151–155. 1923.
- "On a Species of Trichomonas prevalent in Calcutta". Indian Medical Gazette. 61 (1): 10–14. 1926.
- "A Note on the Parasite of" Dermal Leishmanoid"". Indian Medical Gazette. 62 (1): 11–12. 1927.
- with R. Knowles: "Laboratory Studies in Surra. I. On the Role of the Thyroid Gland in Susceptibility and Resistance to a Protozoal Infection". Indian Journal of Medical Research. 15 (4)): 997–1057. 1928.
- with Ram Nath Chopra & B. Sen: "Atebrin in the Treatment of Indian Strains of Malaria". Indian Medical Gazette. 68 (8): 425–432. 1933.
- Das Gupta, B. M. (1936). "Observations on the flagellates of the genera Trichomonas and Eutrichomastix". Parasitology. 28 (2): 195–201. doi:10.1017/s0031182000022393.
- Das Gupta, B. M. (1936). "Trichomonas sp. from the gut contents of a corai snake". Parasitology. 28 (2): 202–205. doi:10.1017/s003118200002240x.

=== Books ===
- with R. Knowles and Ronald Senior-White: Studies in the parasitology of malaria. Indian Medical Research Memoirs 18. Calcutta: Thacker, Spink & Co. 1930.
- with R. Knowles and B. C. Basu: Studies in Avian Spirochaetosis: Parts I & II. Indian Medical Research Memoirs 22. Calcutta: Thacker, Spink & Co. 1932.
- with R. Knowles: Knowles's introduction to medical protozoology (2nd ed.). Calcutta: U. N. Dhur & Sons. 1944.
