= Purnima Sinha =

Indian physicist (1927–2015)

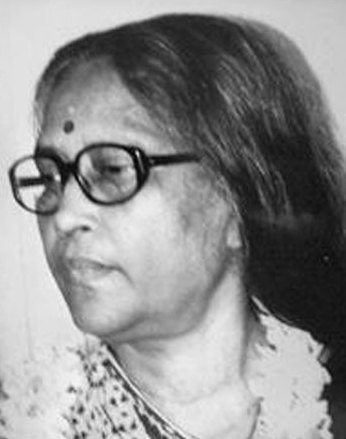
- Born: 12 October 1927; Kolkata, British India
- Died: 11 July 2015 (aged 87); Bengaluru, India
- Education: Rajabazar Science College; University of Calcutta
- Known for: Being the first Bengali woman to receive a doctorate in physics
- Spouse: Surajit Chandra Sinha
- Children: Sukanya Sinha, Supurna Sinha
- Parent: Nares Chandra Sen-Gupta
- Scientific career
- Fields: X-ray crystallography of clay minerals
- Workplaces: Indian Institute of Science, Bangalore
- Doctoral advisor: Satyendra Nath Bose

Dr. Purnima Sinha (12 October 1927 – 11 July 2015) was an Indian physicist and was one of the first Bengali women to earn a doctorate in physics. She did work in the field of x-ray crystallography of clay minerals. She was raised by a progressive family in a traditional era. She was able to further her education, pursue her passion of physics, and engage in artistic activities such as singing, painting, and writing.

== Early life ==
Purnima was born on 12 October 1927 to a Hindu Baidya family from the village of Banshi in Tangail (present-day Bangladesh). She was the daughter of Dr. Nares Chandra Sen-Gupta, a constitutional lawyer and progressive writer. She married the anthropologist Surajit Chandra Sinha, former vice-chancellor of Visva-Bharati University, who made significant contributions to understanding the process of acculturation of tribal peoples in India.

Her daughters Supurna Sinha and Sukanya Sinha are physicists at Raman Research Institute and Indian Statistical Institute, respectively.

With her husband, she started an informal school, Mela Mesha r Pathshala in Shantiniketan, an institute for tribal children.

== Education and career ==
Sinha's early education started in Lake School for girls, in Kolkata, which was founded by her elder sister Sushama Sengupta. She then attended Asutosh College, followed by the Scottish Church College, and finally the prestigious Rajabazar Science College, University of Calcutta. She became the first woman to earn a PhD in Physics from Calcutta University in 1956. She was mentored by Professor Satyendra Nath Bose, a theoretical physicist known for his work in quantum mechanics.

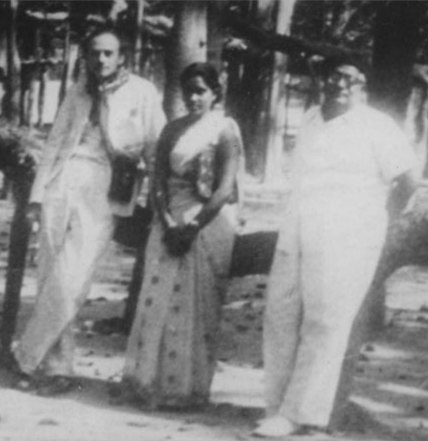
Dr Purnima Sinha with Satyendra Nath Bose and Paul Dirac at Botanical Gardens in Calcutta during the 1954 visit

Sinha's career in science spanned several decades. She earned her doctorate in x-ray crystallography of clay minerals. She received her doctorate from the University of Calcutta as a student of the Rajabazar Science College in 1956–7, under the guidance of professor Satyendra Nath Bose. She was the first Bengali woman to receive a doctorate in physics.

At the start of joining Professor Satyendra Nath Bose, she had scoured surplus army equipment sold as scrap on the footpaths of Calcutta after the Second World War. Sinha was looking for spare parts to build the X-ray equipment she needed for her doctoral research. X-ray techniques were being applied to unravel DNA structure on the other side of the globe around 1953. Her research was funded by Assam Oil Company at a time when research-industry collaboration was rare. Not only did she build it, but she also went on to study different types of clay from across India. Later, Sinha joined the Biophysics Department at Stanford University's ‘Origin of Life’ project, which had an interface with her work. She compared the X-ray structure of clay with DNA patterns, geometrically, and was fascinated to find a connection.

== Publications ==
Sinha wrote extensively on many subjects in both English and Bengali. She was a regular contributor to Jnan O Bijnan (Knowledge and Science), a Bengali-language scientific journal published by Bangiya Bijnan Parishad (Bengal Science Association), founded by Satyendra Nath Bose. Recently Bangiya Bigyan Parishad awarded and felicitated her for popularizing science in Bengali, a passion she shared with her teacher. She translated Erwin Schrödinger's Mind and Matter into Bengali in 1990. She wrote the book An Approach to the Study of Indian Music in 1970, and articles about folk music based on folk music recordings done in the field by her husband and her during anthropological field studies in the tribal regions of Purulia in West Bengal. She wrote the analytical article "Jarawa Songs and Vedic Chant: A Comparison of Melodic Pattern" for the Journal of Asiatic Society in 2005, based on their field trip to the Andaman Islands in 1988.

She wrote extensively on Satyendra Nath Bose, including:

- Bijnan Sadhanar Dharay Satyendranath Bose, book published by Visva Vidya Sangraha
- Amar Katha, book published by Bangiya Bijnan Parishad
- Satyen Bose-er Byaktitto O mononer dhara, article published in Desh

== Other interests ==
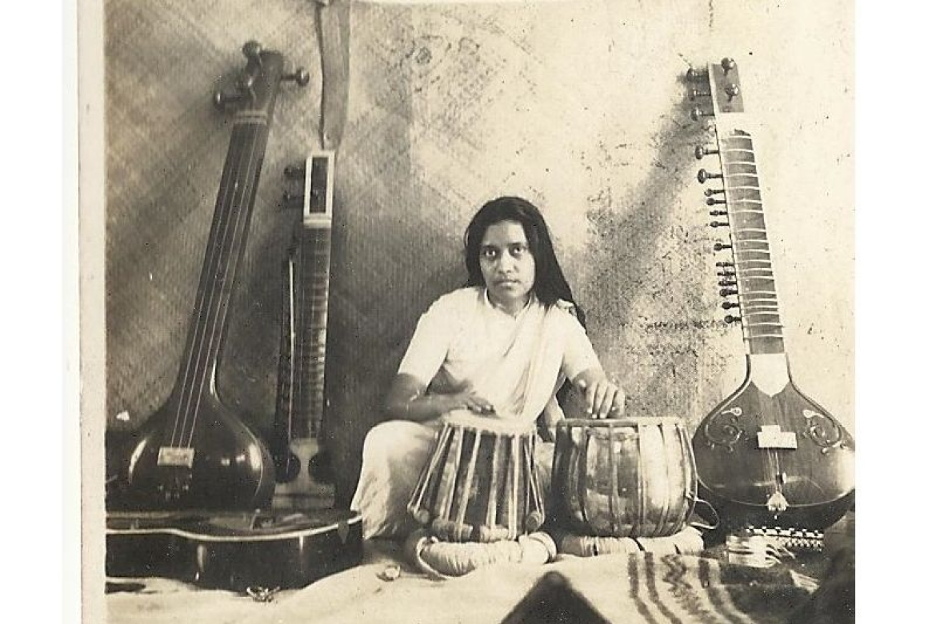
Sinha playing the tabla

Sinha enjoyed singing, painting, writing, and reading books. She had a large, rare collection of books and journals at home. At the age of 80, she continued to enjoy meeting people, conversing and reminiscing. When she joined the Central Glass and Ceramic Research Institute, Sinha continued her work on clay minerals and ceramic colours. She also moulded the material that she studied in artistic ways and learned clay modelling. When not indulging her creative pursuits, Sinha was translating science books into Bengali.

Her artistic interests were varied and included learning Hindustani classical music from Yamini Ganguly, and painting from the well-known painter Gopal Ghosh. She also took tabla lessons from Pandit Jnan Prakash Ghosh. Her other interests included sculpting and painting.
