= Surajit Chandra Sinha =

Indian anthropologist

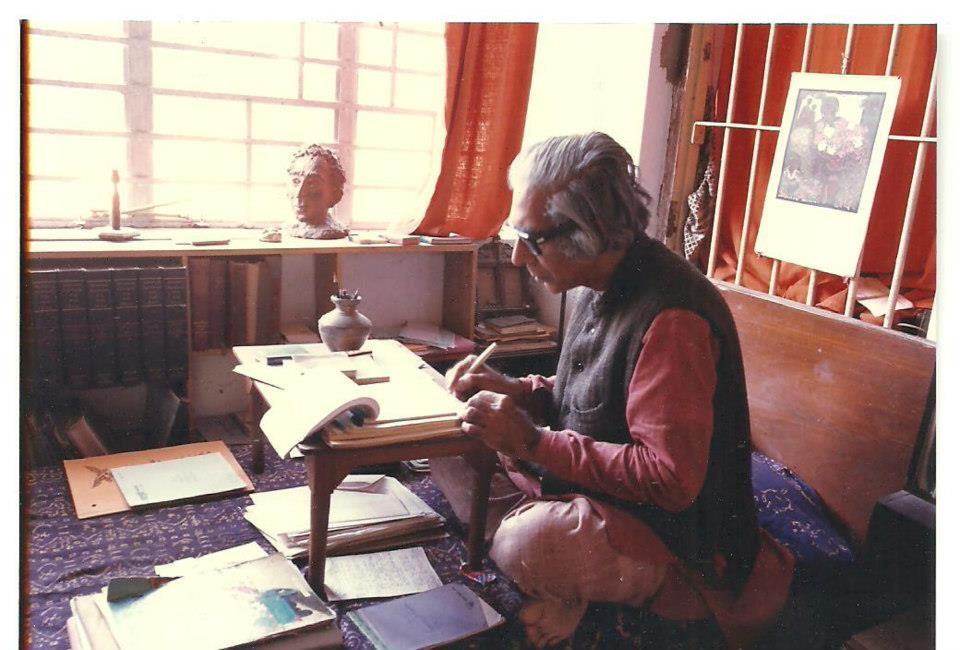
- Prof. Surajit Sinha working at his home in Shantiniketan.
- Born: 1 August 1926; Durgapur, Bengal Presidency, British India
- Died: 27 February 2002 (aged 75); Santiniketan, West Bengal, India
- Occupations: Anthropologist, administrator
- Spouse: Purnima Sinha
- Relatives: Mani Sinha (paternal uncle)

Surajit Chandra Sinha (1 August 1926 – 27 February 2002) was an Indian anthropologist.

== Background ==
Born in Durgapur Upazila under Netrokona in the Bengal Presidency (now in Bangladesh), he was the eldest son of Maharaja Bhupendra Chandra Sinha of Susang, who was a student of Presidency College, Calcutta and a well-known landscape painter. His mother was a daughter of Jogendranath Moitra, the zamindar of Sithlai in Pabna District. Her family members traced their origins to the reign of Emperor Jahangir. Sinha's youngest sister is Purba Dam, the eminent exponent of Rabindrasangeet.

A close paternal uncle, Maharajkumar Mani Singh was a well-known Communist Party leader who wrote Jiban Sangram. and was later elected head of the communist party of East Pakistan. In his youth he (Sinha) followed in the footsteps of his paternal uncle. His maternal uncle was Kumar Jyotirindra Moitra (popularly called "Botukda"), of the Sithlai family, who distinguished himself as an eminent Rabindrasangeet singer, and who later wrote the school anthem, 'Amader Patha Bhavan', for Patha Bhavan, Kolkata.

Sinha was married to Dr. Purnima Sinha, a physicist, author and music scholar, who was the daughter of the eminent legal scholar and Bengali novelist, Naresh Chandra Sen Gupta.

== Education ==
After his education in a high school in Mymensingh and at Ballygunge Government High School, Calcutta, he started his college education in physics at Presidency College, Calcutta, but then changed to geology and then finally to anthropology. Nirmal Kumar Bose, the eminent anthropologist, became his mentor soon after they met in the viva examination for the master's degree, where Bose was one of the examiners. Later, Sinha completed his Ph.D. in anthropology from Northwestern University in Illinois, United States on a Fulbright Scholarship. He was trained in social anthropological fieldwork at Calcutta University by Tarak Chandra Das, another name among the foremost of the Indian anthropologists, and it was Das who first introduced Sinha to take up the Bhumij community of the then Bihar state for his doctoral work.

== Career ==
He held a number of academic and administrative posts such as deputy director and director of the Anthropological Survey of India in Calcutta. At this time he was considered to be an advisor of the then Indian prime minister, Indira Gandhi. He was the professor of anthropology at the Indian Institute of Management, Calcutta. He became the upacharya of Visva Bharati, Santiniketan. After retirement he became the second director of the Indian Council of Social science Research sponsored Centre for Studies in Social Sciences, Calcutta.

Sinha distinguished himself in the field of social and cultural anthropology. Upon returning to India from the United States, he continued to conduct field research. His main area of interest were Indian tribes, especially the Bhumij tribe in central India. While in USA, Sinha did a unique field study in an American village on religion. His research report entitled "Religion in an Affluent Society" was published in Current Anthropology. Surajit Sinha's original contribution in Indian anthropology could be found in his articles on 'Tribe-Caste and Tribe-Peasant Continua in Central India' (1965), 'State formation and Rajput myth in Tribal Central India' (1962) and 'Bhumij-Kshatriya social movement in south Manbhum (1959) in which he viewed tribes and castes not as separate and isolated social and cultural categories but as parts of the greater Indian civilization in an evolutionary scheme under which formation of the early states in India took place. Sinha was basically a pioneering historical anthropologist of India who combined field and archival data in a very early period of Indian anthropology.

== Opinion ==
Sinha was committed to the ideologies of both Mahatma Gandhi and Rabindranath Tagore, two of the most eminent Indians in the nineteenth and the twentieth centuries. The difference between the views of these two men was that whereas Gandhi wanted every Indian to be (in the best sense) a Shudra, Tagore wanted every Indian to be (also in the best sense) a Brahmin. Sinha held a self-critical view on Indian anthropology. According to him Indian anthropologists save a few exceptions, largely remained 'Western apprentice' and could not develop their own tradition.

== Death ==
He was diagnosed with Alzheimer's disease in 1993 and died after a prolonged illness in 2002.

== Publications ==
- Science, Technology, and Culture: A Study of the Cultural Traditions and Institutions of India and Ceylon in Relation to Science and Technology
- (ed.), Tribal Polities and State Systems in Pre-Colonial Eastern and North Eastern India, (Calcutta, 1987)
- Tribes and Indian Civilization: Structures and Transformation (Varanasi, 1982)
- (ed.), Ascetics of Kashi : An Anthropological Exploration, (co-edited with Baidyanath Saraswati) (Varanasi, 1978)
- (ed.), Field Studies on the People of India : Methods and Perspectives, (In Memory of Professor Tarak Chandra Das), (Calcutta, 1978)
- (ed.), Anthropology in India, Tribal Thought and Culture, (Calcutta, 1976)
- (ed.), Aspects of Indian Culture and Society: Essays in Felicitation of Professor Nirmal Kumar Bose, (Calcutta, 1972)
- (ed.), Cultural Profile of Calcutta, (Calcutta, 1972)
- (ed.), Research Programmes on Cultural Anthropology and Allied Disciplines, (Calcutta, 1970)
- (ed.), Ethnic Groups, Villages, and Towns of Pargana Barabhum: Report of a Survey, (co-edited with Biman Kumar Dasgupta and Hemendranath Banerjee) (Calcutta, 1966)
- (ed.), Levels of a Economic Initiative and Ethnic Groups in Paragana Barabhum, (Durham, N.C., 1964)

== See also ==
- Indian feudalism
