= Indira Chakravarty =

Indian public health specialist

- Born: India
- Education: University College of Science and Technology, University of Calcutta
- Occupation: Public health specialist
- Awards: Padma Shri; Edourdo Souma Award; Indira Gandhi National Priyadarshini Award; USF Global Leadership Award

Indira Chakravarty is an Indian public health specialist, scholar, environmentalist, and 2014 recipient of the Padma Shri, the fourth highest civilian award by the Government of India, for her contributions to the fields of public health and environment.

== Biography ==
Micronutrient deficiency is a serious public health concern in most developing countries. In India, iron deficiency, vitamin A deficiency, and iodine deficiency disorder are of greatest public health significance. In addition, subclinical zinc deficiency, fluorosis, and fluoride-deficient dental caries are important areas of concern, writes Dr. Indira Chakravarty.

Chakravarty is from West Bengal and secured a doctoral degree (PhD) in Biochemistry from Calcutta University, followed by a second doctoral degree (DSc). She is active in the food safety and hygiene industry of India and globally, and has participated in 30 research projects. She has also been involved with two projects of the World Health Organization (WHO), the World Summit for Children and the Hunger Project.

Some of the studies conducted by Chakravarty, such as one conducted on the street vendors of Calcutta, have led to policy changes and new initiatives by the Indian Government. A Global Council member of the International Museum of Women (IMOW), Chakravarty has held many positions of importance such as:

- Chief Advisor – Public Health Engineering Department, Government of West Bengal
- Member – National Drinking Water and Sanitation Council, Government of India
- Board Member – International Institute of Global Health, United Nations University
- Former Member – Food Safety and Standards Authority of India, Government of India
- Former Regional Director, South Asia – Micronutrient Initiative – International Development Research Centre (IDRC)
- Former Director and Dean – All India Institute of Hygiene and Public Health, Government of India
- Former Director – Chittaranjan National Cancer Institute, Government of India
- Former Regional Advisor Nutrition(Act) – Regional Office for South East Asia, World Health Organization
- Regional Coordinator – Asian Regional Centre on Street Foods – Food and Agriculture Organization
- Honorary Scientific Advisor – Foundation for Community Support and Development (FCSD)
- Consultant – World Summit for Children – World Health Organization

== Bibliography ==
Chakravarty is credited as the author of one book and over 250 articles, and has been published in national forums and international journals.

- Indira Chakravarty (1972). Saga of Indian Food A Historical and Cultural Survey. Sterling Publishers. p. 183. ASIN B0000CQ98Q.
- Indira Chakravarty, R K Sinha (2002). "Prevalence of micronutrient deficiency based on results obtained from the national pilot program on control of micronutrient malnutrition". Nutr. Rev. 6 (5): 553–558.

== Awards and honours ==
Chakravarty was awarded the Padhma Shri by the Government of India for her contributions in the fields of public health and environment.

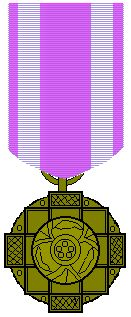
Padma Shri

The Food and Agriculture Organization awarded the first Edourdo Souma Award to Chakravarty. She is also a recipient of the Indira Gandhi National Priyadarshini Award of the All India National Unity Council (AINUC) and the Global Leadership Award of the University of South Florida, the highest international honour of the university. She has also featured in The Multimedia Encyclopedia of Women in Today's World. The Government of India recognized her services by including her in the 2014 Republic Day honours.

== See also ==
- Micronutrient Initiative
- World Summit for Children
- International Museum of Women
