= Mihir Kumar Bose =

Indian geologist and professor

- Born: 1 September 1933; Kolkata, West Bengal, India
- Died: 1 October 2009 (aged 76); Kolkata, West Bengal, India
- Education: University of Kolkata; Presidency College, Kolkata; University of Oslo
- Known for: Studies on Igneous petrology
- Awards: 1972 National Mineral Award; 1976 Shanti Swarup Bhatnagar Prize; 2006 ACS P. N. Bose Memorial Gold Medal
- Scientific career
- Fields: Petrology; Mineralogy
- Workplaces: Presidency College, Kolkata; Council of Scientific and Industrial Research
- Doctoral advisor: S. Ray; Tom F. W. Barth

Mihir Kumar Bose (1 September 1933 – 1 October 2009) was an Indian geologist and a professor at the Presidency College, Kolkata. He was known for his studies on igneous petrology and was an elected fellow of the Geological Survey of India, Indian National Science Academy, and the Indian Academy of Sciences. The Council of Scientific and Industrial Research, the apex agency of the Government of India for scientific research, awarded him the Shanti Swarup Bhatnagar Prize for Science and Technology, one of the highest Indian science awards for his contributions to Earth, Atmosphere, Ocean and Planetary Sciences in 1976.

== Biography ==
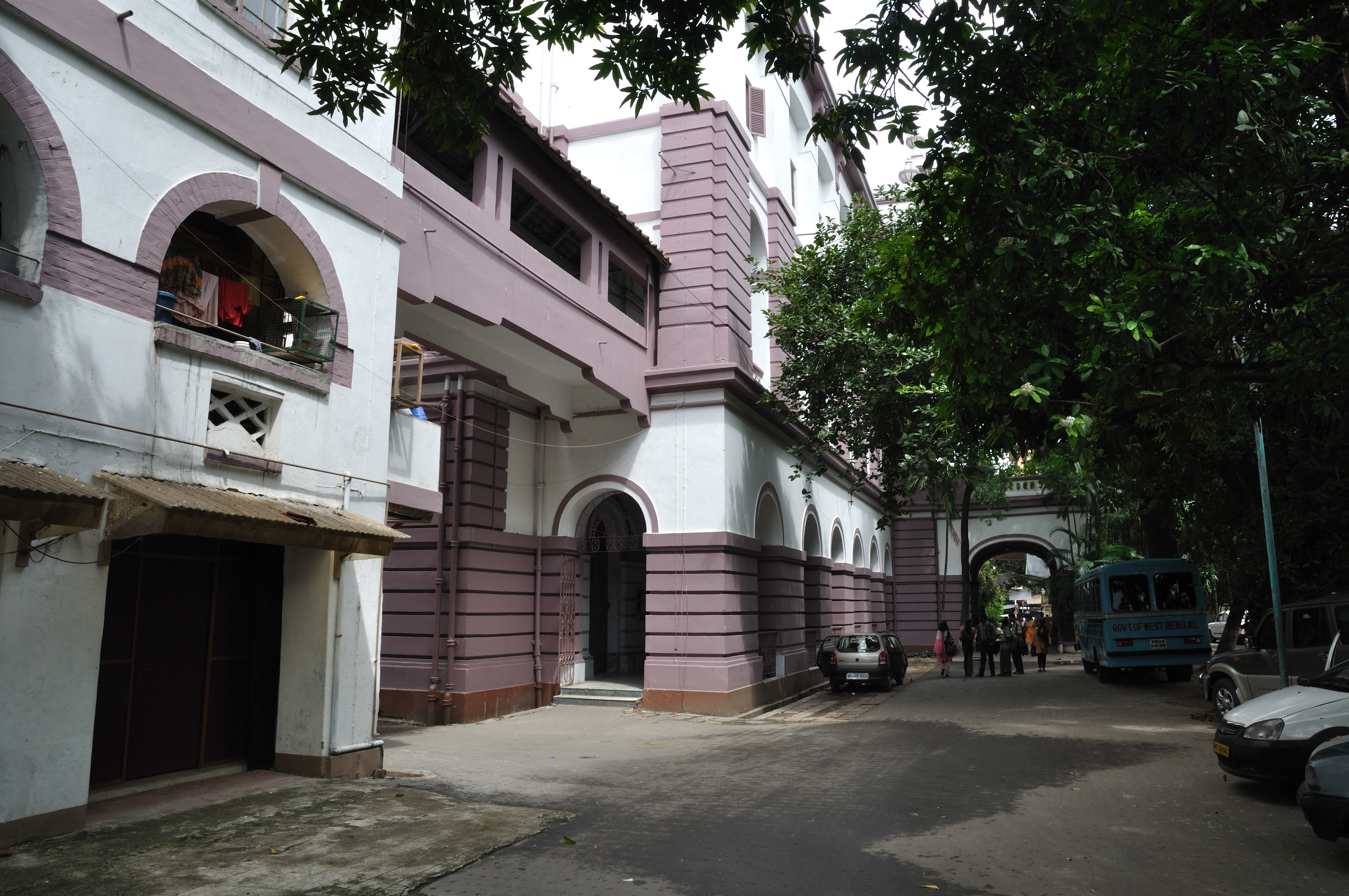
Presidency College, Kolkata

Born on 1 September 1933 in Kolkata, in the present day Indian state of West Bengal, Mihir Kumar Bose graduated in science (BSc hons) from University of Kolkata and after completing a master's degree from the same institution, he joined Presidency College, Kolkata as a member of faculty at their department of geology in 1956. Simultaneously, he pursued his doctoral studies under the guidance of S. Ray and on securing a PhD in 1965, he did his post-doctoral work at the University of Oslo under Tom F. W. Barth, a renowned petrologist, focusing on petrological-mineralogical research. On his return to India, he resumed his duties at Presidency College and served as the reader of geology and a professor till his superannuation from service in 1993. Post-retirement he continued his researches as an emeritus scientist of the Council of Scientific and Industrial Research and as an honorary scientist of the Indian National Science Academy during (1993–97) and (2001–04) respectively. He died on 1 October 2009, at the age of 76.

== Legacy ==
Bose was known to have studied the alkaline rocks and anorthosites in India with emphasis on their chemical petrology using rock forming minerals collected from different chemical milieus and differing pressure-temperature conditions. His studies assisted in widening the understanding of magmatic differentiation and his use of geochemical criteria for identifying the difference between various ultramafic rocks of Singhbhum region in Jharkhand state as well as his contributions in petrologic nomenclature and classification have been reportedly notable. His researches have been documented as one book, Igneous Petrology and several peer-reviewed articles; (Note: Please see Selected bibliography section) the article repository of the Indian Academy of Sciences has listed a number of them. He sat in the subcommission on Systematics and Nomenclature of Igneous Rocks constituted by the International Union of Geological Sciences and the National Committee on Science and Technology of the Government of India. He presided the Geological Mining and Metallurgical Society of India during 2004–06 and served as the vice president of the Indian Association of Geochemists and as an editor of the Indian Journal of Earth Sciences (1972–79).

== Awards and honors ==
Bose received the National Mineral Award in 1972 and the P. N. Bose Memorial Gold Medal of the Asiatic Society in 2006. In between, the Council of Scientific and Industrial Research awarded him the Shanti Swarup Bhatnagar Prize, one of the highest Indian science awards, in 1976. The Indian National Science Academy elected him as their fellow in 1977 and he became an elected fellow of Indian Academy of Sciences in 1983. He was also a fellow of the Geological Society of India.

== Selected bibliography ==
=== Books ===
- Mihir K. Bose (2010). Igneous Petrology. World Press. ISBN 9788187567783.

=== Articles ===
- Mihir Kumar Bose (1959). "A Note on 'Bleached Hornblende'". Mineralogical Magazine. 32 (245) (published July 1959): 177–178. doi:10.1180/minmag.1959.32.245.11.
- Mihir Kumar Bose (1964). "Amphiboles in Alkaline Rocks of Koraput, Orissa". Mineralogical Magazine. 33 (265) (published June 1964): 912–917. Bibcode:1964MinM...33..912B. doi:10.1180/minmag.1964.033.265.07.
- Mihir Kumar Bose (1973). "Petrology and geochemistry of the igneous complex of Mount Girnar, Gujarat, India". Contributions to Mineralogy and Petrology. 39 (3): 247–266. Bibcode:1973CoMP...39..247B. doi:10.1007/BF00383107. S2CID 129626191.
- Chakraborti, Manas K.; Bose, Mihir K. (1985). "Evaluation of the tectonic setting of precambrian dalma volcanic belt, eastern India, using major and trace element characters". Precambrian Research. 28 (3–4): 253–268. Bibcode:1985PreR...28..253C. doi:10.1016/0301-9268(85)90033-6.
- Bose, Mihir K. (1994). "Sedimentation pattern and tectonic evolution of the Proterozoic Singhbhum Basin in the eastern Indian shield". Tectonophysics. 231 (4): 325–346. Bibcode:1994Tectp.231..325B. doi:10.1016/0040-1951(94)90042-6.

== See also ==
- Igneous petrology
