= Sipra Guha-Mukherjee =

Plant geneticist from India

- Born: 13 June 1938; Kolkata, British Raj
- Died: 15 September 2007 (aged 69)
- Education: PhD
- Alma mater: Jawaharlal Nehru University, Delhi
- Known for: "The technique of production of haploid plants through anther culture."
- Scientific career
- Institutions: Jawaharlal Nehru University, Delhi

Sipra Guha-Mukherjee (13 July 1938 – 15 September 2007) (or Shipra) was an Indian botanist who worked on plant tissue culture, molecular biology, and biotechnology. Guha-Mukharji was the scientist behind the breakthrough discovery of "the technique of production of haploid plants through anther culture".

== Early life and education ==
Sipra Guha-Mukherjee was born in Kolkata on 13 July 1938. She was educated in Bombay and Delhi and joined Jawaharlal Nehru University, Delhi for her BSc (Hons) in botany in 1954. She remained in Jawaharlal Nehru University, first as student and then as professor and researcher, for more than 30 years. She completed her MSc there as well. She then went on to do her PhD under Professor B. M. Johri on the tissue culture of an onion, completed it in 1963 (Allium cepa).

She is quoted as saying:

"I decided to study botany because it was my favorite subject in school. As a school student I was awed by the contribution of Sir Jagadish Chandra Bose, and fascinated by his work that showed that plants were living organisms and had a metabolism similar to that of animals. His hypothesis that ascent of sap in plants is due to pulsatory activity of an inner layer of cortical cells (a theory no longer tenable) infused a huge excitement in me, as earlier I used to think that plants were inert objects which could never respond to any external stimuli. As a student in classes five and six, I developed a strong determination to find the locations of the "heart" and "brain" of plants and to understand the way they functioned."

== Research and career ==
Guha-Mukherjee was professor at Jawaharlal Nehru University, Delhi. Her field of specialization was plant tissue culture, plant molecular biology, biotechnology, and cell biology. After her PhD, Guha-Mukherjee joined the lab of S. C. Maheshwari as a postdoctoral fellow, where she did her most significant work. Between 1964 and 1966, she discovered the technique of producing haploid pollen plants through anther culture using Datura innoxia as the culture material, which was published in the journal In Vitro Cellular & Developmental Biology. This work led to the establishment of techniques of culture of young ovules and ovaries. This technique has also been used as an additional tool for obtaining improved varieties of rice, wheat, potato and other crops. She has also worked on regeneration of plants and mechanism of regeneration involving various enzymes, membrane phospholipids, and second messengers during her time at the School of Life Sciences of Jawaharlal Nehru University.

Guha-Mukherjee went to the United States in late-1966 and worked with R. S. Bandurski as a research associate at the Department of Botany and Plant Pathology of Michigan State University. Between 1970 and 1972, she served as an assistant professor in the Biology Department at West Virginia University, and later at the MSU-DOE Plant Research Laboratory when Anton Lang and Joe Varner were there.

After her return to India, Shipra Guha-Mukherjee collaborated with M. S. Swaminathan for raising haploids in rice. Thereafter, she returned to Jawaharlal Nehru University to join the new Life Science Faculty as one of its founding internet. She was promoted to full professor in 1979 and served as the Dean of Life Sciences between 1993 and 1995. She also served as member of the task force and scientific advisory committee of the Department of Biotechnology, and also on the board of the University Grants Commission.

== Awards and recognition ==
Guha-Mukherjee received the Senior National Bio-scientist Award, the Om Prakash Bhasin Foundation Award in Biotechnology, and the Kanishka Award from the Lion's Club. She was elected a Fellow of the Indian Academy of Sciences in 1988 and of the National Academy of Sciences, India.

== Death ==
Sipra Guha-Mukherjee died on 15 September 2007 due to brain cancer.
