= Mitali Mukerji =

Indian scientist

Dr. Mitali Mukerji
- Born: 13 November 1967 (age 58); Madhya Pradesh, India
- Citizenship: Indian
- Education: IISc Bangalore
- Awards: National Young Woman Bioscientists Award (2007), Shanti Swarup Bhatnagar Award(2010)
- Scientific career
- Fields: human genomics and Ayurgenomics
- Workplaces: New Delhi

Mitali Mukerji (born 1967) is a Professor of the Department of Bioscience and Bioengineering, IIT Jodhpur. She was formerly a Chief Scientist at the CSIR Institute of Genomics and Integrative Biology with notable achievement in the field of human genomics and personalized medicine. She is best known for initiating the field of "Ayurgenomics" in partnership with her colleague Dr. Bhavana Prasher (MD Ayurveda) under the mentorship of Prof. Samir K. Brahmachari. Ayurgenomics is an innovative study, blending the principles of Ayurveda- the traditional Indian system of medicine- with genomics. Mukerji is also a major contributor in the Indian Genome Variation Consortium, a comprehensive database that is producing "the first genetic landscape of the Indian population", and has been an author in many publications that use IGV databases to study population genomics. Mukerji has done extensive research on hereditary ataxias, and is involved in many other projects related to tracking disease origins and mutational histories. She is the recipient of the prestigious Shanti Swarup Bhatnagar Award in 2010 for her contribution in the field of Medical Sciences.

== Personal life ==
Mukerji was born on 13 November 1967 in Madhya Pradesh to Bengali parents. She currently resides in Jodhpur, India. She holds a doctoral degree (Ph.D.) in bacterial molecular genetics from the Indian Institute of Science, Bangalore. In an interview, Mukerji states one of her most influential mentors has been Dr. Samir Kumar Brahmachari, the former Director General of the Council of Scientific and Industrial Research known for his works in biophysics and pharmacogenetics.

== Career & research ==
After completing her doctoral degree, Mukerji joined the Institute of Genomics and Integrative Biology in New Delhi in 1997. She has since worked in the field of population genetics and evolutionary genomics and has also had a particular interest in personalized medicine and the integration of Western Medicine and Ayurvedic medical practices.

One of her most notable works was deciphering the functions of Alu regions, the most abundant transposon found in primate populations. Her and her team concluded that these sequences code for RNA that serve as transcription factors, regulating a multitude of cell functions, including heat shock stress responses. Mukerji's publications on Alu sequences provide evidence of its involvement in homeostatic maintenance in humans, as well as the functions of miRNA as regulatory pathways specific to humans. Mukerji has since continued to work in trying to understand the mechanisms behind heat shock response systems and the functions of satellite non-coding RNA as a transcriptional repressor.

She took an active role in establishing the Indian Genome Variation Consortium. Created in 2003, this database collects information on the genetic variations between the multiple subpopulations in India in an effort to improve personalized pharmaceuticals and understand genetic predisposition to disease. She established that genomic data could be adopted to decipher "signatures of natural selection and tracing mutational histories", and has used her studies to track migration patterns of many Asian populations and disease origins. Data from this initiative was used in a publication Mukerji was a contributor on, linking the genetic ancestry of the Siddi people from the Western region of India to Bantu-speaking East African tribes.

Another study in which Mukerji used the IGV database is in studying keratinization genes, associated with waterproofing epidermal layers and being a contributor to different skin phenotypes for populations living in different climates. She wanted to see whether or not this gene responds to environmental stresses and how intensely or rapidly. Using an analysis of copy number variants and DNA and protein sequence differences amongst diverse Indian populations from varying climates, Mukerji makes conclusions about the changes within this area of skin-related genes and the role it plays in adaptations in response to environmental stimuli.

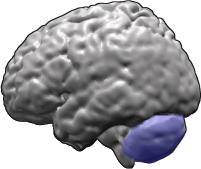
In blue is the cerebellum; this portion of the brain becomes swollen or injured in cerebellar ataxias.

Mukerji has also done significant work towards bettering clinical diagnostics processes of disorders in India. She worked particularly with a group of neurodegenerative diseases known as Cerebellar ataxias, a heritable condition in which the cerebellum portion of the brain becomes damaged. This condition is known to arise from a combination of many mutations, and so establishing a clear genetic correlation is difficult, making clinical screening difficult as well. Through tracing the disease ancestry and "mutational history", as well as a study of thousands of Indian families, Mukerji and her team were able to get a better understanding of the underlying genetic mechanisms that cause ataxias and develop a clinical screening to be able to check disease susceptibility of healthy patients. This method is being used at the All India Institute of Medical Sciences and helps reduce economical and medical stresses on families. Further studies done by Mukerji show more evidence of the mechanisms behind ataxias. Her work in studying spinocerebellar ataxia identifies a repeat expansion mutation as the cause of the disorder. Analysis of single nucleotide polymorphisms in Indian and Mexican families show a shared expansion pattern in these two geographically distinct groups, making it possible to understand more about the ancestry of these particular mutations that cause this disease.

In another study, Mukerji and her team analyzed another heritable neural disorder, dyslexia. They identified genes of a PCDHG cluster and pinpointed specific chromosomal locations of polymorphisms that contribute to the disorder. They also tracked the mutational history and lineages of these polymorphism, in both humans and other related primates. Their work helps better explain the mechanisms in play in dyslexia and the association of PCDHG genes with "neural adhesion proteins" that are related to cognitive functionality in primates. Mukerji also studied active pulmonary tuberculosis in North Indian populations. Through a study of cytokine serum levels between patients with active tuberculosis and healthy individuals, Mukerji was able to identify five cytokine gene polymorphisms correlating to immunity against tuberculosis.

Along with her other projects tracking mutational history and disease evolution, Mukerji also did work studying correlations between polymorphisms in the APOBEC3B gene and malaria susceptibility. Many versions of this gene with various insertions and deletions are found in human populations. Mukerji's study found a clear correlation between an insertion in this gene and populations with endemic levels of falciparum malaria, the most severe form of malaria, or in the genomes of descendants from such areas. Accordingly, their study also shows a strong correlation between a deletion in this gene and weakened defense against falciparum malaria. This provides direct evidence through population genetics survey that suggests that variants of the APOBEC3B have some effect on susceptibility to this form of malaria.

Mukerji actively initiated the field of "Ayurgenomics", integrating the phenotyping Ayurveda principles of Indian medical system with "objective parameters of modern medicine for identifying molecular endophenotypes." She states that she wants her research to be able to "contemporize Ayurveda" by finding valid molecular backing for Ayurvedic practices and being able to use both to better preventative medical practice. Her research on SNPs and CNV diversity in the Indian population as a part of the Indian Genome Variation Consortium provided genetic evidence for Ayurvedic "Prakritis", or subgroups of healthy individuals based on phenotypic differences that govern an individual's lifestyle and medical profile. These "Prakriti's" are used for "assessing disease susceptibility and drug responsiveness", a concept that parallels ideas of personalized pharmaceuticals in Western Medicine. One molecular example Mukerji and her team studied has to go with the EGLN1 gene, associated with oxygen retention in bodily tissues and the condition of hypoxia. Differences in this key gene are associated with high-altitude adaptations in particular populations, and agree with the distinguishing of different Prakriti's, giving a molecular basis for the ancient medical practice. Mukerji has found other such biological markers that also support the Ayurvedic body types, such as levels of lipids. A unique finding of her studies in genomics is "that the ethnically and linguistically diverse Indian population was united by distinct DNA patterns". This has led to the inference that the genomics-based treatments of pharmacogenetics, also encompassing Ayurvedic practices, are possible.

Mukerji continued her study with hypoxia in examining and trying to decipher its correlation with asthma and other pulmonary conditions. The study, conducted on mice, used a pharmacologically induced hypoxic response to study how gene expression and induction factors are affected by the condition, and how this may lead to symptoms that cause the development of asthma. Mukerji and her team discovered that an exaggerated hypoxic response did indeed increase asthma in mice, even to fatal levels. This is clinically relevant as many pharmaceutical drugs function by tampering with these hypoxic response mechanisms, though the details of the mechanisms and its effects on the body are not well known.

In January 2014, Mukerji gave a lecture at a TEDx event in New Delhi, India on the practice of personalized medicine through Ayurveda and its integration with modern medicine and genomics.

== Awards ==
Mukerji has received several prestigious awards. On 24 September 2001, she was awarded the CSIR Young Scientist Award. She then was nominated to be a member of HUGO, the Human Genome Organization, in 2006. She received the National Young Woman Bioscientists Award in 2008 and the prestigious Shanti Swarup Bhatnagar Award in 2010. In 2014, Mukerji became an elected fellow of the Indian Academy of Sciences and in 2016, was awarded the VASVIK award for Women Scientists. Most recently, in 2017, Mitali Mukerji was awarded the Pushpalata Ranade National Woman Award.

== Publications ==
Mukerji has several technical publications to her credit. She is also the Associate Editor for evolutionary and population genetics of the Frontiers journal. Some of her notable publications are:

- Heat shock factor binding in Alu repeats expands its involvement in stress through an antisense mechanism. Pandey R, Mandal AK, Jha V, Mukerji M. (2011) Genome Biol. 12(11):R117.
- Ayurgenomics: a new way of threading molecular variability for stratified medicine. Sethi TP, Prasher B, Mukerji M. (2011) ACS Chem Biol. 6(9):875-880.
- Recent admixture in an Indian population of African ancestry. Narang A, Jha P, Rawat V, Mukhopadhyay A, Dash D. Indian Genome Variation Consortium, Basu A, Mukerji M. (2011) Am J Hum Genet. 89(1):111-120.
- EGLN1 involvement in high-altitude adaptation revealed through genetic analysis of extreme constitution types defined in Ayurveda. Aggarwal S, Negi S, Jha P, Singh PK, Stobdan T, Pasha MA, Ghosh S, Agrawal A. Indian Genome Variation Consortium, Prasher B, Mukerji M. (2010) Proc Natl Acad Sci USA. 107(44):18961-18966.
- Whole genome expression and biochemical correlates of extreme constitutional types defined in Ayurveda. Prasher B, Negi S, Aggarwal S, Mandal AK, Sethi TP, Deshmukh SR, Purohit SG, Sengupta S, Khanna S, Mohammad F, Garg G, Brahmachari SK, and Mukerji M. (2008) J. Transl. Med. 6:48.
- Genetic landscape of the people of India: a canvas for disease gene exploration. Indian Genome Variation Consortium. (2008) J Genet. 87(1): 3–20.
- Genome-wide prediction of G4 DNA as regulatory motifs: role in Escherichia coli global regulation. Rawal P, Kummarasetti VBR, Ravindran J, Kumar N, Halder K, Sharma R, Mukerji M, Das SK, Chowdhury S. (2006) Genome research. 16(5): 644–55.
- First Degree Relatives of Patients with Celiac Disease Harbour an Intestinal Transcriptomic Signature that Might Protect them from Enterocyte Damage. Acharya P, Kutum R, Pandey R, Mishra A, Saha R, Munjal A, Ahuja V, Mukerji M, Makharia GK. (2018) Clin Transl Gastroenterol. 9(10):195.
- Western Indian Rural Gut Microbial Diversity in Extreme Prakriti Endo-Phenotypes Reveals Signature Microbes. Chauhan NS, Pandey R, Mondal AK, Gupta S, Verma MK, Jain S, Ahmed V, Patil R, Agarwal D, Girase B, Shrivastava A, Mobeen F, Sharma V, Srivastava TP, Juvekar SK, Prasher B, Mukerji M, Dash D. (2018) Front. Microbiol. 9:118.
- Recapitulation of Ayurveda constitution types by machine learning of phenotypic traits. Tiwari P, Kutum R, Sethi T, Shrivastava A, Girase B, Aggarwal S, Patil R, Agarwal D, Gautam P, Agrawal A, Dash D, Ghosh S, Juvekar S, Mukerji M, Prasher B. (2017) PLOS One. 2(10):e0185380.
- Alu-miRNA interactions modulate transcript isoform diversity in stress response and reveal signatures of positive selection. Pandey R, Bhattacharya A, Bhardwaj V, Jha V, Mandal AK, Mukerji M. (2016) Sci Rep. 6:32348.
- Human satellite-III non-coding RNAs modulate heat-shock-induced transcriptional repression. Goenka A, Sengupta S, Pandey R, Parihar R, Mohanta GC, Mukerji M, Ganesh S. (2016) J Cell Sci. 129(19):3541-3552.
- Ancestral Variations of the PCDHG Gene Cluster Predispose to Dyslexia in a Multiplex Family. Naskar T, Faruq M, Banerjee P, Khan M, Midha R, Kumari R, Devasenapathy S, Prajapati B, Sengupta S, Jain D, Mukerji M, Singh NC, Sinha S. (2018) EBioMedicine. 28:168-179.
