= Palash Sarkar =

Indian mathematician

Palash Sarkar (born 28 September 1969) is an Indian mathematician and a professor at the Applied Statistics Unit at the Indian Statistical Institute. His main research interest is Cryptology.

He was awarded in 2011 Shanti Swarup Bhatnagar Prize for Science and Technology, the highest science award in India, in the mathematical sciences category.
