= Peer Fischer =

British robotics researcher

Peer Fischer is a German robotics researcher, specializing in biological nanorobotics.

== Biography ==
He received a B.Sc. in Physics from Imperial College London. He did his Ph.D. with A. David Buckingham at the University of Cambridge. He was a DAAD (NATO) postdoctoral fellow at Cornell University and then held a Junior Research Fellowship at the Rowland Institute at Harvard where he directed an independent lab for five years.

In 2009, he set up a photonics lab at the Fraunhofer Institute for Physical Measurement Techniques in Freiburg via an Attract Award from the Fraunhofer Society. He moved to the Max Planck Institute for Intelligent Systems in Stuttgart in 2011, and since 2013 he is a professor at the University of Stuttgart.

Peer Fischer is a member of the Max Planck – EPFL Center for Molecular Nanoscience and Technology, and the research network on Learning Systems with ETH Zürich. Furthermore, he is Fellow of the Royal Society of Chemistry and a Founding Editorial Board Member of the journal AAAS Science Robotics.

== Publications ==
His most cited publications are:

- Ambarish Ghosh & Peer Fischer "Controlled propulsion of artificial magnetic nano-structured propellers" Nano Letters . 2009, 9, 6, 2243–2245. According to Google Scholar, this article has been cited 1013 times
- Stefano Palagi, Andrew G. Mark, Shang Yik Reigh, Kai Melde, Tian Qiu, HaoZeng, Camilla Parmeggiani, Daniele Martella, Alberto Sanchez-Castillo, Nadia Kapernaum, Frank Giesselmann, Diederik S. Wiersma, Eric Lauga, Peer Fischer "Structured light enables biomimetic swimming and versatile locomotion of photoresponsive soft microrobots" Nature Materials (2016) doi:10.1038/nmat4569 According to Google Scholar, this article has been cited 425 times
- Andrew G. Mark†, John G. Gibbs, Tung-Chun Lee and Peer Fischer "Hybrid nanocolloids with programmed three-dimensional shape and material composition" Nature Materials 23 June 2013 | DOI: 10.1038/NMAT3685 According to Google Scholar, this article has been cited 343 times
- G.-Z.Yang, J.Bellingham, P.E.Dupont, P.Fischer, L.Floridi, R.Full, N.Jacobstein, V.Kumar, M. McNutt, R. Merrifield, B. J. Nelson, B. Scassellati, M. Taddeo, R. Taylor, M. Veloso,

Z. L. Wang, R. Wood, The grand challenges of Science Robotics. Science Robotics. 3, eaar7650 (2018). According to Google Scholar, this article has been cited 394 times

== Honors ==
World Technology Award 2016
