= Ambarish Ghosh =

Indian physicist (1973-)

- Born: 18 December 1973 (age 52); Kolkata, India
- Education: IIT, Kharagpur; Brown University; Harvard University
- Awards: Shanti Swarup Bhatnagar Prize; Fellow of National Academy of Sciences; Fellow of Indian National Science Academy; Tata Transformation Prize (2025); Sree Ramakrishna Paramahamsa Translational Biomedical Research Award
- Scientific career
- Fields: Nanorobotics; Plasmonics; Quantum Fluids
- Workplaces: Indian Institute of Science
- Doctoral advisor: Humphrey Maris
- Website: http://www.cense.iisc.ac.in/ambarish/

Ambarish Ghosh is an Indian scientist, a faculty member at the Centre for Nano Science and Engineering (CeNSE), Indian Institute of Science, Bangalore. He is also an associate faculty at the Department of Physics. He is known for his work on nanorobots, active matter physics, plasmonics, metamaterials and electron bubbles in liquid helium.

== Research work ==
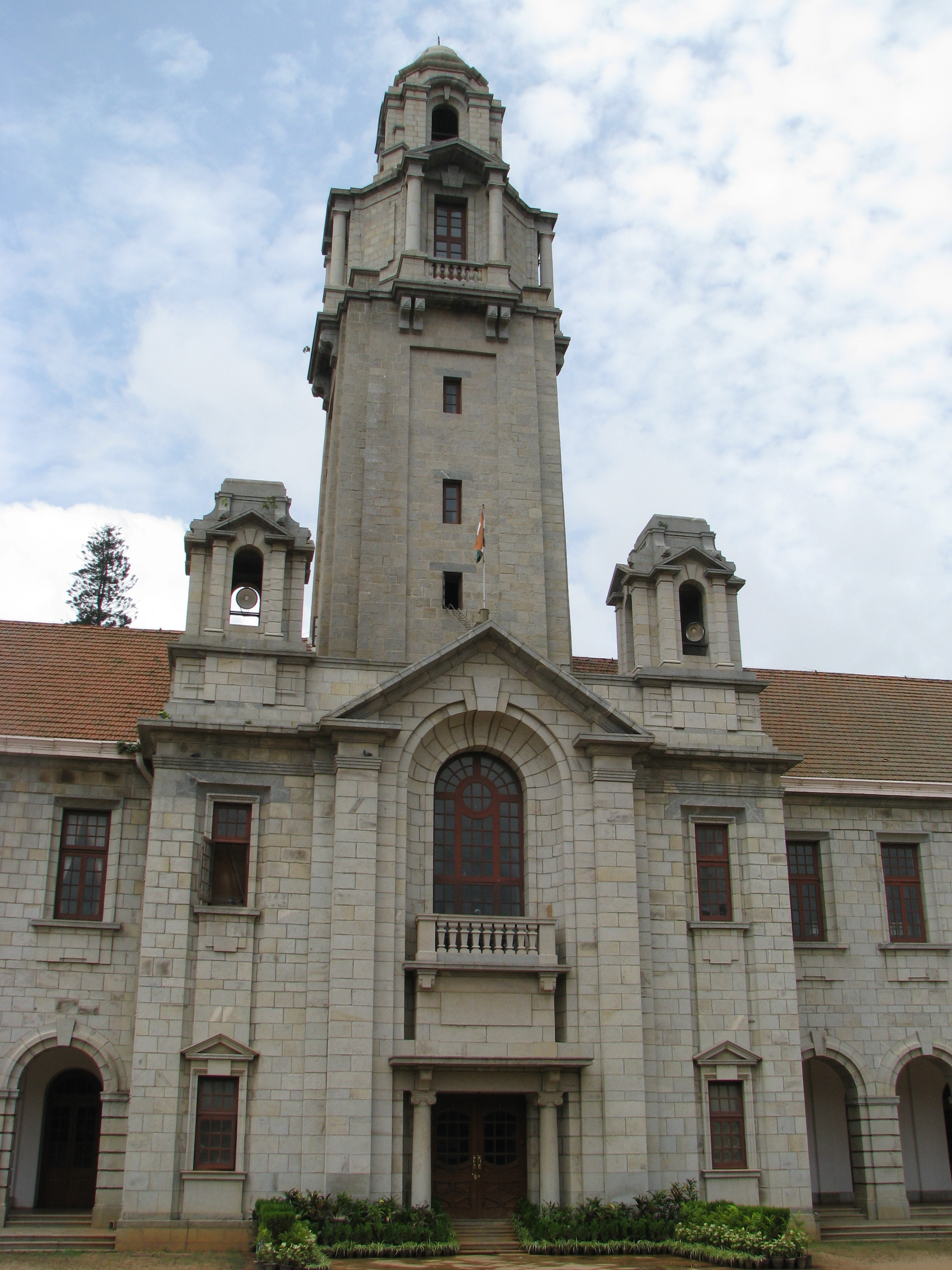
Indian Institute of Science

=== Magnetic nanorobots ===
In 2009, he along with Peer Fischer demonstrated the use of glancing-angle deposition to fabricate magnetic helical nanorobots. His group worked out the theoretical formulae to describe the dynamics of such nanorobots and presented techniques for their independent control.

In recent years his group has managed to demonstrate various applications of helical nanorobots including techniques to move in important biological environments, such as blood. and as probes for sensing the environment inside living cells.

His group is also developing magnetic nanorobots for targeted cancer therapy. Such treatments would be less invasive, with fewer side effects, and would be lower in cost as well.

=== Plasmonics and Metamaterials ===
Ambarish Ghosh and his group demonstrated a wafer scale technology to fabricate porous 3D plasmonic metamaterials which can be used over a wide range of wavelengths, including the visible. These metal-dielectric nanostructured films can be made in various geometries and configurations. Very recently, they have demonstrated a novel technique to integrate plasmonic nanoparticles with graphene in a sandwich configuration, allowing them to achieve unprecedented electromagnetic field enhancement and photodetection sensitivity. In 2019, his group showed the application of metal-dielectric hybrid nanorods in active opto-fluidic manipulation of sub-micron colloids.

=== Electron bubbles in Liquid Helium ===
The group led by Ambarish Ghosh demonstrated trapping of multielectron bubbles in liquid helium-4, which can open up new avenues in the study of two-dimensional electron systems at high densities, and on curved surfaces. The same group also performed high speed imaging of the "explosion" of an electron bubbles triggered by focused ultrasound.

== Recognition ==
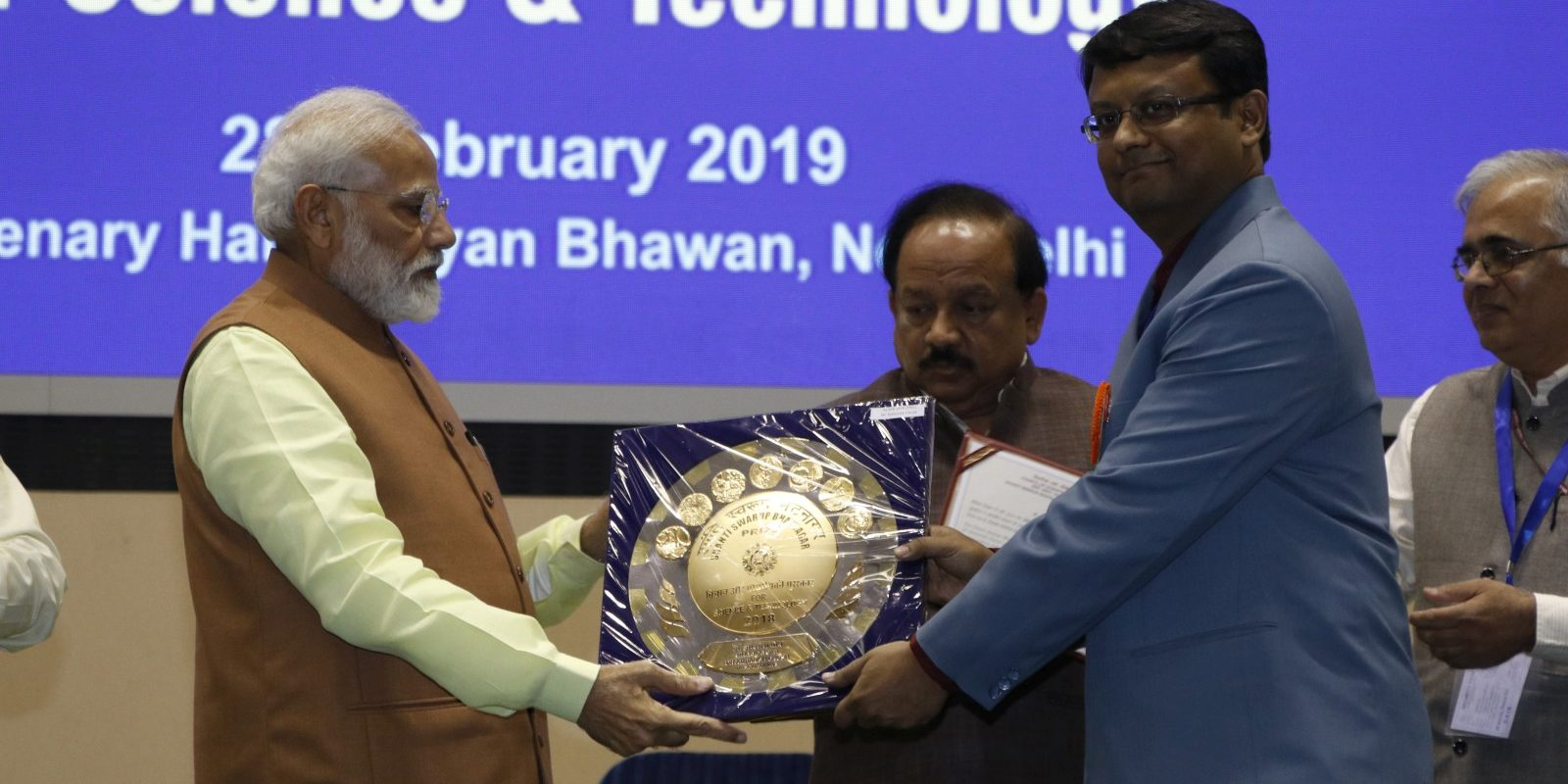
Ambarish Ghosh receiving SSB award from Prime Minister Modi

Ambarish received the Young Career Award in Nano Science and Technology for 2017 from DST Nanomission, India. The Council of Scientific and Industrial Research awarded him the Shanti Swarup Bhatnagar Prize for Science and Technology in 2018. He held the *Prof. Ramakrishna Rao Chair Professorship* from 2017 to 2020. He was elected as a Fellow of INAE in 2020. He was elected Fellow of the Indian Academy of Sciences in 2023. He received the P. K. Iyengar Memorial Award for Excellence in Experimental Physics (2022) and the Lam Research Unlock Idea Award (2022).

In 2023, he received the Sree Ramakrishna Paramahamsa Translational Biomedical Research Award from the Sree Padmavathi Venkateswara Foundation and the IISc Research Award 2023. He was elected Fellow of the Indian National Science Academy (INSA) in 2024 and Fellow of the National Academy of Sciences, India (NASI) in 2024.

In 2025, he was awarded the Tata Transformation Prize by the New York Academy of Sciences for his work on magnetic nanorobots for targeted cancer therapy. In 2026, he received the Alumni Award for Excellence in Research for Engineering from the Indian Institute of Science.
