= Nares Chandra Sen-Gupta =

Indian lawyer and writer

- Born: May 3, 1882; Bogra, Bengal Presidency, British India
- Died: September 19, 1964 (aged 82); Calcutta, West Bengal, India
- Education: Calcutta University
- Occupations: Professor, lawyer, litterateur
- Children: 8, including Purnima Sinha
- Relatives: Sunetra Sarker (great-granddaughter)

Naresh Chandra Sen-Gupta (2 May 1882 – 19 September 1964) was an Indian legal scholar and a novelist of Bengali literature based in Calcutta.

== Early life and career ==
Sen-Gupta was born into a Baidya Brahmin family on 17 May 1882 at his maternal uncle's home in Bogra (now in Bangladesh). His parental home was in the village of Banshi in Kalihati, Tangail district. His father, Maheshchandra Sengupta, was a deputy magistrate. He received his Master of Arts degree in philosophy from Calcutta University in 1903 and carried on research on 'Neo-German and Indian Philosophy' up to 1905 at Presidency College as a government scholar. He obtained a doctorate in law from Calcutta University in 1914 that examined the social and legal structures of the ancient Indian civilization.

== Law career ==
After obtaining a degree in law, Dr. Sen-Gupta started practising law at Calcutta High Court and at the same time started teaching at the Law College of Calcutta University. He was appointed as vice principal of Law Department of Dhaka College in 1917. He started gaining fame as a legal scholar while teaching at Dacca University as a professor in the Law Department from 1921 to 1924. He also served as the first Dean of the Faculty of Law and the first provost of Jagannath Hall at the university.

Dr. Sengupta returned to Calcutta in 1924, resumed his law practice and taught law at Calcutta University. In 1950, he became the Tagore Law Professor at the university and represented India at the UNESCO International Copyright Convention in the United States in 1951. In 1956, he was appointed as a member of the Indian Law Commission. He was also a Senior Advocate at the Indian Supreme Court.

== Literature ==
Apart from his legal practice and writings on law, Naresh Chandra Sen-Gupta made substantial contributions to Bengali literature through his excellent essays, short stories, plays and novels. He was a prolific novelist of his time and authored about sixty novels and dramas many of which proved controversial for their liberal philosophy and espousing of women's rights in then conservative climate of the Bengali society. He was a pioneer in writing naturalistic Bengali novels, analyzing the psyche of criminals and the role of sex in the commission of crime.

He was more interested in a woman's personality than in her goodness and chastity. He was at the center of a controversy about decency and morality in literature and was accused of indecency for his short story, 'Thandidi'. His writings, unraveling the mysterious ways of criminality, reflect the long years of his legal practice. He wrote 60 books, among those that deserve special mention are the collections of short stories: Ruper Abhishap and Thandidi; novels: Agni Sangskar (1919), Shubha (1920), Paper Chhap (1922) and Abhayer Biye; plays: Ananda Mandir (1923), Thaker Mela (1925), Rsir Meye (1926). He raised different social issues in Subha, Paper Chap and Abhayer Biye. These and several other novels were later produced as movies.

He was the first translator of the novel Anandamath by Bankim Chandra Chatterji with the fifth edition published in 1906 titled "The Abbey of Bliss".

== Politics and other activities ==
In 1936 an all-Indian association of progressive writers was formed with Sen-Gupta as chairman to condole the death of Russian writer Maxim Gorky. In later years this association played an important role in introducing a new outlook and progressive thinking in Bengali literature. Dr. Sengupta was also associated with politics for some time. He became known as an active Indian National Congress worker during the partition of Bengal launched in 1905 to annul the partition of Bengal. He was also president of the Workers and Peasants Party (1925–26) and the Labour Party of India (1934).

== Personal life ==
Naresh Chandra Sen-Gupta married Labanya Probha Baksi and had six daughters and two sons. His second daughter, Sushama Sengupta was an educationist, early pioneer in women's education, and established Lake School for Girls in Calcutta. His youngest daughter, Purnima Sinha was the first Bengali woman to receive a doctorate in physics. His other children as well as his grandchildren pursued their education and careers in science, medicine, engineering, performing arts and literature. Several of them are well known in their fields in India, UK and USA.

The British-Indian actress Sunetra Sarker is his great-granddaughter, as revealed in a 2017 episode of the BBC series Who Do You Think You Are?

== Death ==
Naresh Chandra Sen-Gupta died on 19 September 1964 at his home in South Calcutta.

== Works ==
Among his law books, the Evolution of Ancient Indian Law remains a classic that can still be found in libraries around the world.
