= Samir Das =

Indian-American computer scientist and engineer

Samir R. Das
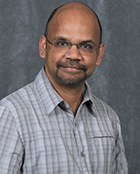
- Education: Georgia Tech; Indian Institute of Science; Jadavpur University
- Scientific career
- Fields: Computer science
- Workplaces: Stony Brook University (2002–present)
- Doctoral advisor: Richard Fujimoto

Samir R. Das is an Indian-American Stony Brook University professor who attended Jadavpur University and Indian Institute of Science. He was also associated with Indian Statistical Institute in Kolkata. He obtained his Ph.D. from the Georgia Institute of Technology. He was former faculty in University of Texas at San Antonio and University of Cincinnati where he conducted research in computer science particularly in wireless networking. As of 2017 his work Ad hoc on-demand distance vector (AODV) was cited over 26,000+ times. Many of his research works are highly cited, giving him an h-index of 54.
