= Prabha Chatterji =

Indian scientist

- Education: Indian Institute of Science
- Awards: Vasvik Award, MRSI Lecture award
- Scientific career
- Fields: Polymer Chemistry, Applied Chemistry, Polymer Materials
- Workplaces: General Electric

Prabha R. Chatterji is an Indian scientist at John F. Welch Technology Centre (formerly General Electric Global Research and Technology Development center), Bangalore, India.

She was formerly a senior scientist at the Indian Institute of Chemical Technology, Hyderabad and a past member of the executive committee of the Society for Biomaterials and Artificial Organs, India. She works primarily related to scientific and technical education in India.

== Education ==
She graduated from a small college in an undistinguished village near Ottappalam in Kerala. As a college student, she was awarded the National Science Talent Search Scholarship by the Indian Institute of Science, Bangalore. The scholarship helped her pursue her post graduation, PhD in 1977 and subsequently a career in Science.

== Career ==
Prabha's career trajectory involves a stint in academia governmental research and development and then industry. She received the Vasvik Award for industrial research and the MRSI Lecture award. She is also involved in policies of scientific and technical education in India.

== Works ==
Chatterji has published 41 papers and has an h-index of 16.

- Chatterji, Prabha R. (1989). "Gelatin with hydrophilic/hydrophobic grafts and glutaraldehyde crosslinks". Journal of Applied Polymer Science. 37 (8): 2203–2212. doi:10.1002/app.1989.070370812.
- Chatterji, Prabha R. (5 August 1990). "Interpenetrating hydrogel networks. I. The gelatin–polyacrylamide system". Journal of Applied Polymer Science. 40 (34): 401–410. doi:10.1002/app.1990.070400308.

== Awards ==
Chatterji is a recipient of the Vasvik Award (industrial research) and the MRSI Lecture award.
