= Manju Ray =

Indian scientist in molecular enzymology and cancer biochemistry

- Born: 1 January 1947; Chhaysuti, Bangladesh
- Died: 30 June 2021; Calcutta
- Education: Rajabazar Science College, Calcutta University
- Occupation: Biochemist
- Known for: Molecular Enzymology Methylglyoxal Biochemistry
- Spouse: Late Subhankar Ray
- Children: Ishika Ray, Ekarshi Ray
- Awards: Shanti Swarup Bhatnagar Prize (1989)

Manju Ray was an Indian scientist specializing in Molecular Enzymology and Cancer Biochemistry. Her research has contributed significantly to the development of anticancer drugs and understanding the differentiation process of cells. Her interests include tumor biochemistry and molecular enzymology. She was awarded the Shanti Swarup Bhatnagar Prize for Science and Technology in the year 1989, being only the second woman to receive this award in the category 'Biological Sciences'.

== Education ==
Ray graduated from the prestigious Science college campus of Calcutta University with degrees in M.Sc. in physiology in 1969 and PhD in biochemistry in 1975.

== Research ==
Ray started her career in the Department of Biochemistry, Indian Association of Cultivation of Science. Since December 2010, she was an Emeritus Scientist at Bose Institute, Kolkata. Ray's research has focused on understanding the biological role of methylglyoxal, a side-product of several metabolic pathways. Over the course of her career, she and her team have isolated, purified and characterized a series of enzymes involved in methylglyoxal anabolism and catabolism. Her work has also focused on studying anticancer properties of methylglyoxal, with positive results observed in the first phase of clinical trials.

== Awards ==
- 1975: Indian National Science Academy (INSA) Young Scientist Medal in Biological Science
- 1989: Shanti Swarup Bhatnagar Prize for Science and Technology in Biological Science
- 2003: Dr. I.C. Chopra Memorial Award
- Dr. Jnan Chandra Ghosh Memorial Award

== Publications ==
Ray has published a large number of scientific papers as lead author in association with others and some of which are:

- Inhibition of respiration of tumor cells by methyl glyoxal and protection of inhibition by lactaldehyde (1991) in International Journal of Cancer
- Inhibition of electron flow through complex I of the mitochondrial respiratory chain on Earlich Ascites Carsinoma cells by methyl Glyoxal (1994) in Biochemical Journal
- Glyoxalase III from Escherichia coli a single novel enzyme for the conversion of methylglyoxal into D-lactate without reduced glutathione (1995) in Biochemical Journal
- Methylglyoxal : From a putative intermediate of glucose breakdown to its role in understanding that excessive ATP formation in cells may lead to malignancy (1998) in Current Science
- Glyceraldehyde-3-phosphate dehydrogenase from Earlich Ascites Carcinoma cells: its possible role in the high glycolysis of malignant cells (1999) in European Journal of Biochemistry
