= Anadish Pal =

Indian inventor (born 1963)

Anadish Kumar Pal
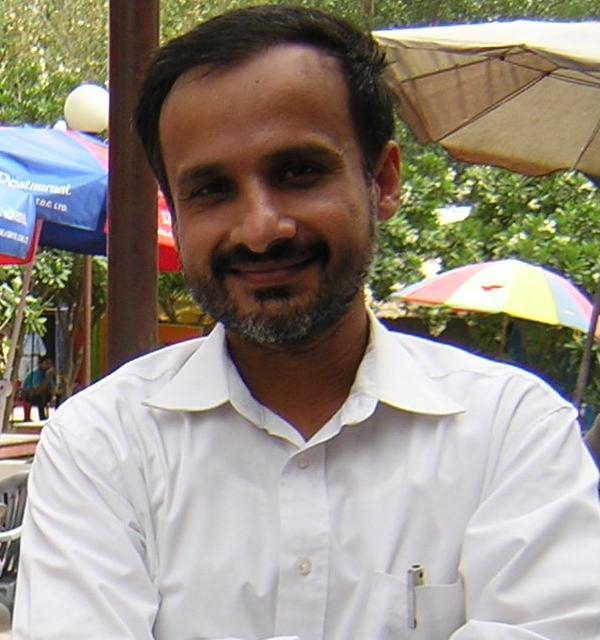
- Born: 1963 (age 62–63); Delhi, India
- Known for: Inventions, Saving trees in Delhi and envioronmentalist.
- Scientific career
- Fields: Science, Technology, poetry, environmentalist
- Workplaces: Independent Inventor, and environmentalist

Anadish Kumar Pal (born in Delhi, India, 1963) is an Indian inventor, poet, and environmentalist.

== Biography ==
He is of Bengali origin. Anadish Pal has obtained ten United States patents, a significant patent issued in 2009 for an electromagnetically controlled, fuel-efficient internal combustion engine is titled, "Relaying piston multiuse valve-less electromagnetically controlled energy conversion devices". He was granted two more patents in 2009 for a unique gas-operated reloading gun which is titled in the patent grant as "Magnetic gyro-projectile device with electronic combustion, turbogeneration and gyro stabilization" and for a railgun. In 2007, the Office of Naval Research of the United States Navy showed interest in his railgun technology. He was issued another significant patent in 2007 for a 3D computer mouse. He has a patent for a high torque electric motor also. His last patent, obtained in 2013, is for gravity modulation and its reception where he has claimed to have demonstrated a gravitational wave based communication link. He started as a self-taught electronics designer who used to do freelance projects for companies such as Maruti Udyog, Honda, the National Institute for the Visually Handicapped, Dehradun, and Duracell (now a part of Global Gillette). Afterward, he turned his attention to inventions. His concept for a personal mobility vehicle (PMV) for the common man, a diwheel vehicle, did not go beyond the prototype development stage as Pal failed to get companies interested.

Pal is not a qualified designer or engineer. After dropping out of college in 1982, he took to prototyping in electronics, which was his hobby when he was in Gorakhpur living with his late mother (she died in 1982). He designed a DXing radio receiver when he was 14, which never worked; however, he designed his own circuit and made all the PCBs himself. He did freelance projects for Maruti and Honda Power. In 2000, Honda Power product's engineering department in Uttarakhand designed a charging genset with a technical flaw. So, the Indian Army didn't give the genset clearance. Pal designed an SMPS based voltage regulator for the genset, after which it was accepted by the army.

Pal also takes positions as an environmentalist on the issues of saving trees in Delhi and in that regard seems to have come under various threats from an anti-tree lobby.

== Persecution ==
In May–June 2022, Pal and his family were illegally imprisoned, tortured and nearly killed by the police and a local mob. Further, in May 2023, the police started a false criminal case against him and his whole family and staff, branding all of them as criminals.

== Patents ==
- U.S. patent 6,717,300 for an "Arrangement for using induction motor as a sensor to sense its own rotation when electrical power is not being supplied to it"
- U.S. patent 7,017,696 for an "Electric motor vehicle with passenger opening through ring motor"
- U.S. patent 7,170,047 for an "Optoelectronic encoder with three-dimensional scales"
- U.S. patent 7,284,628 for a "Multipurpose motor vehicle with two coaxial parallel wheels and more electromagnetic holonomic wheels in tandem"
- U.S. patent 7,474,020 for a "Relaying piston multiuse valve-less electromagnetically controlled energy conversion devices"
- U.S. patent 7,541,563 for a "Magnetic gyro-projectile device with electronic combustion, turbogeneration and gyro stabilization"
- U.S. patent 7,637,462 for a "Surface flow diverting and static charging ducted pores on wing or blade tip to reduce wake and BVI noise"
- U.S. patent 7,830,059 for a "Stacked rail stator and capacitive armature linear motor "
- U.S. patent 7,863,785 for a "High power-density static-field ac conduction motor"
- U.S. patent 8,521,029 for a "Gravity modulator and gravity-modulation reception "

== See also ==
- Gravitational wave
