= Giuseppe Franchini =

Italian parasitologist

Giuseppe Franchini (1879–1938) was an Italian parasitologist who worked on malaria and leishmaniasis.

He succeeded Alphonse Laveran as the head of the Laboratory of Institut Pasteur in Paris in 1922. He was appointed Professor of Tropical Medicine at the University of Bologna in 1925. In 1930 he joined the University of Modena, where he founded the Institute of Colonial Pathology which was late renamed the Institute of Tropical and Subtropical Diseases. His best known publication is probably the description of Plasmodium knowlesi in 1927.
