= Purushottam Chakraborty =

Indian Physicist and professor

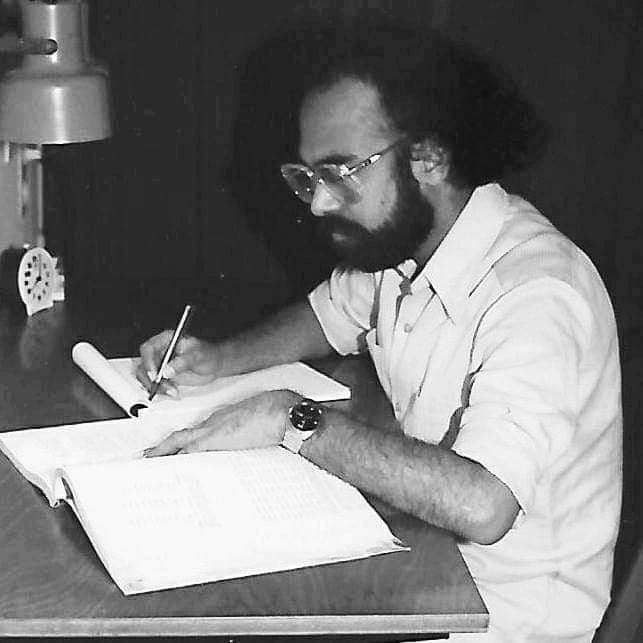
- Born: 1953 (age 72–73); Kolkata
- Education: Brahmananda Keshab Chandra College, Presidency College, Kolkata, University of Calcutta
- Known for: Secondary Ion Mass Spectrometry, Ion Beam Analysis of Materials and Photonics

Purushottam Chakraborty is a distinguished Indian Physicist who does research on materials analysis using ion beams and secondary ion mass spectrometry (SIMS).

Chakraborty is a former Senior Professor of Physics at Saha Institute of Nuclear Physics, Kolkata, India & former Adjunct Professor of Physics at University of Pretoria, South Africa.

He is an Editorial Board Member of the International Journal of Modern Physics B (World Scientific, Singapore) and Modern Physics Letters B (World Scientific, Singapore). He has been a Guest Editor for 2D Materials: Perspectives.

== Scientific career ==
Chakraborty did his PhD on the "Design and development of a radio-frequency (RF) quadrupole mass spectrometer (QMS) for the study of secondary-ions emitted from ion-bombarded metal surfaces". The QMS was initially fabricated by Profs S D Dey, S B Karmohapatro and B M Banerjee at Saha Institute of Nuclear Physics, Kolkata, India.

Chakraborty upgraded the equipment by lowering the frequency of the RF voltage so that the QMS could handle masses above 200 amu and also by converting the system into a full-fledged UHV-based Secondary Ion Mass Spectrometry (SIMS) Setup at Saha Institute of Nuclear Physics, Kolkata. Making use of the indigenous SIMS instrument, he initiated the experimental research on Ion-Matter Interactions, for which he was awarded the Premchand Roychand Scholarship (PRS) and the Mouat Medal by the University of Calcutta in 1986. Later, he pursued research on Atomic Collisions in Solids, Inelastic Ion-Surface Collisions and Ion-Beam Modifications & Analysis of Materials. His other research areas include Low-Dimensional Materials and Nanoscale Systems, X-UV Optics, Optoelectronics, Nonlinear Optics, Photonics and Plasmonics.

Chakraborty worked on the fabrication of 'layered Synthetic Microstructures (LSM)', at the FOM-Institute for Atomic and Molecular Physics – Amsterdam (AMOLF), in collaboration with the Philips Research Laboratories Netherlands.

The methodology of fabricating aspherically curved mirrors for reflecting soft X-rays at near-normal incidence was employed to construct 'Soft X-ray Telescopes' for imaging Solar Corona and Solar Flares in the X-UV domain of the electromagnetic spectrum. The European Space Agency in the Netherlands also used this technique for reflecting X-rays with wavelengths of 1.85 and 10 to 17 Angstroms.

Chakraborty's "Alkali-element based MCsn+ Molecular-ion SIMS" approach has been used for the quantitative analysis of materials without calibration standards, in general and for the composition analysis of surfaces and interfaces of ultrathin films, superlattices and nanostructured materials, in particular.

Chakraborty's work on 'Ion-beam Synthesis of Metal-Glass Nanocomposites' has led to the development of novel photonic materials, thereby opening the way for advances in all-optical switching, coupled waveguides and optical computation.

Chakraborty has delivered invited lectures at universities and research institutes such as Imperial College London, UK; Vanderbilt University, USA; Yale University, USA; Asian Institute of Technology, Thailand; Kyoto University, Japan; and CERN (Geneva), Switzerland to name a few.

== Awards and recognition ==
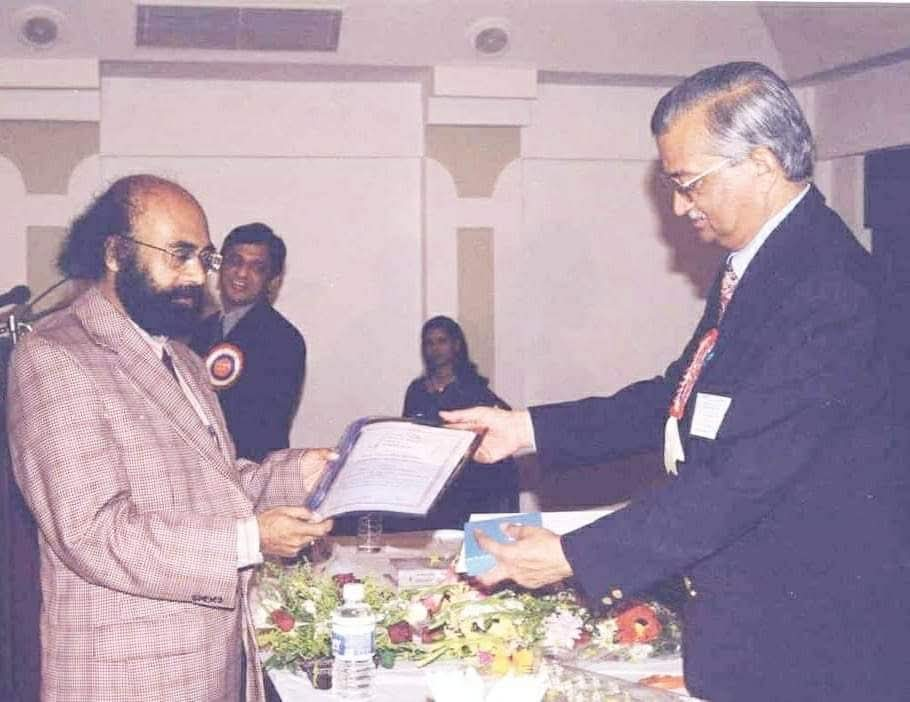
Purushotttam Chakraborty is receiving Gold Medal and Citation from the Chairman, Atomic Energy Commission, Government of India, for being awarded "Most Eminent Mass Spectrometrist of India"

- He is awarded the most Eminent Mass Spectrometrist of India by the Indian Society for Mass Spectrometry (ISMAS) at the Symposium on Mass Spectrometry, held at the National Institute of Oceanography , Goa on 27 January 2003.
- Adjudged the "Most Eminent Mass Spectrometrist of India' by the Indian Society for Mass Spectrometry (ISMS) for his outstanding contributions in SIMS
- Conferred "Gold Medal" in 2003 by the Chairman, Atomic Energy Commission, Government of India
- Premchand Roychand Scholar of the University of Calcutta (1979)
- Mouat Silver Medal – Awarded by the University of Calcutta (1986)
- Fellow, West Bengal Academy of Science and Technology
- Fellow, Indian Chemical Society

== Publications ==
- "Nonlinear Phenomenon in Nanostructures", (World Scientific, Singapore), p:350, 2025
- Purushottam Chakraborty, MCsn+-SIMS: An Innovative Approach for Direct Compositional Analysis of Materials without Standards, Energy Procedia, Volume 41, (2013), p. 80-109
- M P Bruijn, Prof. Chakraborty, J. Verhoeven, H W van Essen, M. J. van der Wiel, Automatic electron-beam deposition of multilayer soft x-ray coatings with laterally graded d-spacing, Optical Engineering 25, 916 (1986)
- Purushottam Chakraborty, Layered synthetic microstructures as optical elements for the extreme ultraviolet and soft X-rays, Int. J. Mod. Phys B 5, (1991), p:2133-2228
- Biswajit Saha, Purushottam Chakraborty, Hubert Gnaser, Manjula Sharma and Milan K Sanyal, Exact compositional analysis of SiGe alloys by matrix effect compensated MCs+-SIMS, Appl Phys A 108, 671 (2012)
- P. Chakraborty, Metal nanoclusters in glasses as non-linear photonic materials, Journal of Materials Science (Kluwer Academic Publishers) Volume 33, p: 2235-2249 (1998)
- Binita Ghosh and Purushottam Chakraborty, Optical Nonlinearities of Colloidal Metal Quantum Dot – Glass Composites for Nanophotonics (Book: Nanocomposites and Polymers with Analytical Methods) (Edited by John Cuppoletti, Intech Publishers) (2011)
- Journal of Physics: Conference Series (IOP Publications, UK), Volume 80 (Edited by Pranawa C Deshmukh, Purushottam Chakraborty and Jim F Williams), (2006)
- Ghosh, Binita; Chakraborty, Purushottam (2023). "Metal Quantum Dot – Glass Composites as Nonlinear Optical Materials for Photonic Applications". Encyclopedia of Materials: Electronics. pp. 139–175. doi:10.1016/B978-0-12-819728-8.00009-7. ISBN 978-0-12-819735-6.

== Books ==
- Low-Dimensional Materials, Systems and Applications, Volume 1 Editor: Purushotttam Chakraborty, Elsevier, 1st Edition, October 21, 2025, ISBN 978-0-443-24804-7
- Low-Dimensional Materials, Systems, and Applications, Volume 2, Editor: Purushotttam Chakraborty, Elsevier, 1st Edition - October 30, 2025, ISBN 978-0-443-44593-4
- Volume 2: Photonic Materials 2023, Encyclopedia of Materials: Electronics; Elsevier, ISBN 978-0-12-819735-6
- Ion Beam Analysis of Surfaces and Interfaces of Condensed Matter Systems (Edited by Purushottam Chakraborty), Nova Science Publishers, New York, 2002, ISBN 1590335384
- Chakraborty, Purushottam (2023). "Introduction". Encyclopedia of Materials: Electronics. pp. 1–5. doi:10.1016/B978-0-12-819728-8.00065-6. ISBN 978-0-12-819735-6.
- Nanoscale Matter and Principles for Sensing and Labeling Applications. Advanced Structured Materials. Vol. 206. 2024. doi:10.1007/978-981-99-7848-9. ISBN 978-981-99-7847-2.
