= Clay mineral X-ray diffraction =

Process for material identification

Clay minerals are one of the more diverse minerals but all have a commonalty of crystal or grain sizes below 2 μm. Chemically, clays are defined by crystal structure and chemical composition, often determined by clay mineral X-ray diffraction. Sometimes fine grain sediments are mistakenly described as clays; this is actually a description of the "clay-size fraction" rather than the mineralogy of the sediment. There are three crystallographic clay groups: platy clays (phyllosilicates), fibrous clay minerals, and amorphous clay. Phyllosilicates are the more abundant clays and are categorized based on the layering of a tetrahedral and octahedral layer. For most clays, the octahedral layer is centered with Al^{3+}, Fe^{3+}, or Mg(OH)_{2}, but sometimes Zn^{2+}, Li^{+}, and Cr^{3+} can substitute as well. Si^{4+} is normally the center of the tetrahedral layer but Al^{3+} will often partially substitute and create a charge imbalance. Two-layer clays are composed of a tetrahedral layer and an octahedral layer (T-O) while three-layer clays contain an octahedral layer sandwiched by two tetrahedral layers (T-O-T). When substitution of Al^{3+} for Si^{4+} creates a charge imbalance, an interlayer cation will fill in between tetrahedral layers to balance the charge of the clay.

== X-ray diffraction method ==
X-rays are used to determine the crystal structure of materials. It is an experimental method in which a beam of X-rays is made to pass through a sample of the material being tested. Since the atoms are arranged in some order in crystals, they tend to diffract the beam at certain angles and at certain intensities. The angles of the diffracted X-rays and the crystal structure of the material is calculated. It is also possible to determine if the material is not crystalline.

== X-ray diffraction of clays ==
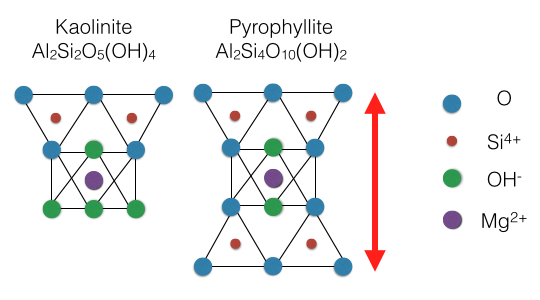
Structure of a two-layer clay, kaolinite (T-O) and pyrophyllite (T-O-T) with red arrow to represent the Z dimension. T-O-T clays are naturally larger in the Z direction because of the extra layer provided by the additional tetrahedral layer.

Typically, powder X-ray diffraction (XRD) is an average of randomly oriented microcrystals that should equally represent all crystal orientation if a large enough sample is present. X-rays are directed at the sample while slowly rotated that produce a diffraction pattern that shows intensity of x-rays collected at different angles. Randomly oriented XRD samples are not as useful for clay minerals because clays typically have similar X and Y dimensions. The Z dimension differs from clay to clay and is most diagnostic because the Z dimension represents the height of the tetrahedral-octahedral (T-O) or tetrahedral-octahedral-tetrahedral (T-O-T) layer. The Z dimension can increase or decrease because of substitution of the central cation in both the tetrahedral and octahedral layers. The presence and size of a charge balancing cation in the inter-layer of T-O-T clays will also effect the Z dimension. Because of this, clay minerals are typically identified by preparing samples so that they are oriented to increase basal (00l) reflection . D positions are calculated using Bragg’s law but because clay mineral analysis is one dimensional, l can substitute n, making the equation l λ = 2d sin Θ. When measuring the x-ray diffraction of clays, d is constant and λ is the known wavelength from the x-ray source, so the distance from one 00l peak to another is equal.

=== Identification of clays using XRD ===
Basal reflections give d-spacing of the basal layer which represent the thickness of the silicate layers and the unit cell often contains multiple layers. Clay mineral peaks can generally be distinguished by the width halfway up the peak (i.e. the full width at half maximum, FWHM). Well-defined crystalline minerals have sharp peaks while clays, which range from crystalline to noncrystalline, produce broad peaks with noticeable width on both sides. These broad peaks make it easy to pick out which peaks are contributed by clays. These peaks can be compared to known diffraction patterns for better identification but if some peaks are broader than others, it is likely that multiple clays are present. The Clay Mineral Society maintains a collection clays for the purpose of comparison to unknown clays. Because the majority of the clays available from the Clay Mineral Society are naturally formed, they can contain minerals other than the desired clay. Diffraction patterns calculated using theoretical methods do not generally match with experimental diffraction patterns, so using diffraction patterns from known samples to help identify a clay is preferable to calculation. Some minerals can be eliminated from identification using background information or prior analysis.

Well-crystallized and pure samples are ideal for x-ray diffraction, but this is rarely the case for clay. Clay minerals are almost always mixed with very small amounts of nonclay minerals which can produce intense peaks, even when there is very little of the sample is not a clay. If additional minerals are known to be presents, attempts should be made to separate clays from nonclays otherwise additional peaks should be expected. Some common minerals associated with naturally occurring clays are; quartz, feldspars, zeolites, and carbonates organic matter is sometimes present. Synthesis of clays can reduce the presence of some of these associated materials but does not guarantee pure samples as quartz or other associated materials are still commonly produced alongside synthetic clays.

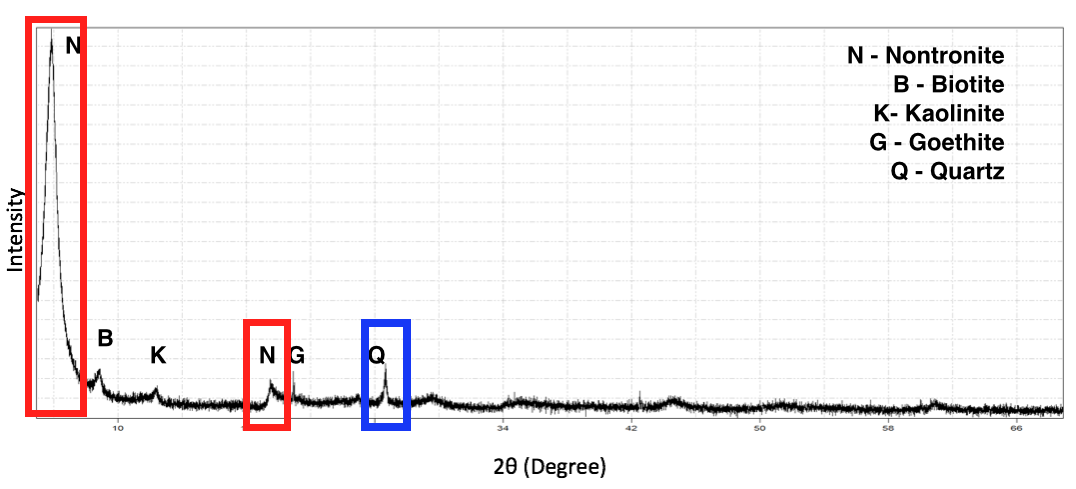
X-ray diffraction pattern of a Nontronite standard purchased from the clay mineral society. Red boxes represent a wide peaks attributed to nontronite. Blue box represents a sharp peak attributed to quartz present in the standard.

=== Mix layered clay minerals ===
Mixed–layering, interlaying, and interstratification are all terms that refer to clay minerals that form with two or more types of clays that with intergrown layering. Mixed-layering does not refer to clays that have been physically mixed. Mixed-layering in clays make add difficulty to interpretation so multiple analysis are usually necessary. Two component clays are most common with multicomponent clays containing more than two components are very rare. The entire diffraction pattern contributes to the identification and peaks should be considered as a whole rather than individually.

Mixed layer clays with two equal components (50% of each clay) are the easiest to identify. These clays are thought of as one, non-mixed clay with a 001 spacing that is equal to the sum of the 001 spacing of both components. Some commonly occurring 50/50 mixed-layer clays are even given unique names such as dozyite, a Serpentine/Chlorite. Mixed clays that have unequal components with random stacking produce aperiodic 00l diffraction patterns known as irrational patterns. The coefficient of variation (CV) is the percent standard deviation of the average of d(001) calculated from various reflections. If CV is less than 0.75% then the mineral is given a unique name. If CV is greater than 0.75% then mixed-layered nomenclature is used.

== Preparation for clay mineral X-ray diffraction ==
Clays should be separated from the nonclay minerals to reduce interference of 00l peaks. Nonclay minerals can usually be separated by sieving samples at a small enough mesh. Samples should be lightly crushed but not pulverized because nonclay minerals will be reduced to clay sizes and become impossible to separate from the sample. Lightly crushing breaks apart the soft clays while keeping harder nonclays intact for easier removal.

Samples should be as homogeneous as possible, both in grain size and composition before mounting them for X-ray diffraction and long, flat, and thick samples are ideal. Four methods are commonly used for sample preparation and vary in difficulty and appropriateness of use.

=== Glass slide method ===
Easiest and fastest of the four commonly used methods but also the least accurate. A glass microscope slide is covered with a suspension of sample in water then placed in an oven at 90 °C and left to dry. For some samples, drying at temperatures this high can damage the clays. In that case, drying at room temperature is an option but will require more time. Orientation is usually fair and particles are segregated with the finest particles toward the top. This method produces thin films which provide inaccurate diffraction intensities at moderate and high angles.

=== Smear method ===
This is a quick method that is good identifying bulk sample constituents. The sample is crushed with a mortar and pestle until the powder is able to be brushed onto a glass slide. The powder is then mixed with a few drops of a dispersant solution, usually ethanol but others are available, and spread evenly over the slide. Both large and small grain size fractions can utilize this method.

=== Filter membrane peel technique ===
This technique prevents size segregation by using either quick filtration or rapid stirring to overcome settling velocities. Sample is poured into a vacuum filter apparatus and filtered quickly but some liquid is left remaining so that air is not drawn though the sample, the remaining is liquid is then decanted. The damp sample is then inverted onto a glass slide and the filter paper is removed. Fast filtration allows a representative particle size to collect on the filter paper which is then inverted and exposed when mounted on a slide.

=== Centrifuged porous plate ===
Produces the best diffraction patterns out of the four most common methods but requires the most skill and is most time-consuming. Upon completion, samples have thick aggregates and preferred orientation. A special apparatus designed to hold a porous ceramic plate is placed into a centrifuge container and filled with suspended sample. Centrifuging forces the liquid through the porous plate leaving the sample behind to be dried below 100 °C. An advantage of this method is that exchangeable cations can be removed by passing a chloride solution through the plate once the sample has been dried. Exchanging cations can be useful when establishing peaks for standards with variable interlayer cations. For example, nontronite has an interlayer which can contain both calcium and sodium. If an unknown sample was suspected to only contain one of these cations, a more accurate standard could be prepared by exchanging the undesired cation.
