= Chitra Mandal =

Indian Scientist

- Born: 1951 (age 74–75)
- Education: University of Pennsylvania IISC Bangalore
- Awards: JC Bose National Fellowship
- Scientific career
- Workplaces: CSIR Indian Institute of Chemical Research

Chitra Mandal is a chemical biologist in the field of biomolecules and their applications in health and diseases. Later she worked on cancer therapeutics. She served as the acting Director of CSIR - Indian Institute of Chemical biology in Kolkata, India. during 2014–2015.

== Education and career ==
Mandal completed her PhD early on in her career from Indian Institute of Science, Bangalore, in the area of bio-organic chemistry. She went on to do post doctoral research at University of Pennsylvania in Philadelphia. Returning to India, she joined and serve CSIR-IICB as a senior scientist. Later she went on to head the Innovation Complex in Kolkata, and then its Director from 2010 to 2015. Her research area is mainly the glycosylation of biomolecules and their potential application in disease management, cancer and tumor immunology. The lab is also investigating low cost healthcare solutions using medicinal plants indigenous to India, for example, the identification of a non-toxic herbal molecule in cancer cell treatments.

Nine of her journal articles have since been retracted due to data and figure issues.
