= Ram Nath Chopra =

Indian pharmacologist

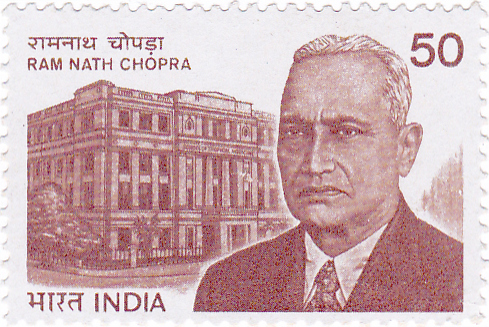
- Born: 17 August 1882; Gujranwala, Punjab Province, British India (now Gujranwala, Pakistan)
- Died: 13 June 1973 (aged 90); Srinagar, Jammu and Kashmir, India
- Known for: Father of Indian Pharmacology; Doyen of science and medicine
- Awards: Knighthood (1941); Companion of the Order of the Indian Empire (CIE; 1934)
- Scientific career
- Fields: Pharmacology

Sir Ram Nath Chopra CIE, IMS (17 August 1882 – 13 June 1973) was an Indian Medical Service officer and a doyen of science and medicine of India. He is considered the "Father of Indian Pharmacology" for his work on pharmaceuticals and his quest for self-sufficiency of India in drugs through the experimental evaluation of indigenous and traditional drugs. After service in the army, he established a research laboratory where he worked as a professor of Pharmacology at the Calcutta School of Tropical Medicine which was established in 1921. He also served as the director of this institute from the year 1935 to 1941.

Chopra was born in Gujranwala. His father Raghu Nath was a government official. After school in Lahore he went to the Government College there and then went to England in 1903 and studied at the Downing College, Cambridge. In 1905 he qualified in the Natural Sciences Tripos and was admitted BA. He received a B.Chir. in 1908 and an MA in 1909. He worked under Walter E. Dixon professor of the newly established position in pharmacology. He was inspired by the experimental approaches in pharmacology. While at St. Bartholomew's Hospital in London, Chopra wrote the examination for the Indian Medical Service and stood third in it. Chopra was commissioned a lieutenant in the Indian Medical Service on 1 August 1908 and promoted to captain on 1 August 1911. He saw active service in East Africa and in the Afghan War of 1919. He was promoted to the temporary rank of major on 7 May 1919 and confirmed in the substantive rank on 1 August 1920, (back-dated to 1 February 1920). In 1922 he was appointed Professor of Pharmacology at the Calcutta School of Tropical Medicine which had been established the year before. He took a special interest in indigenous drugs and noted that a key aim for India should be self-sufficiency in drug resources. He conducted pioneering studies on herbal remedies including Rauvolfia serpentina. He headed a Drugs Enquiry Committee of 1930–31 which examined the need for imports, control and legislation.

Chopra took an interest in public health. He was invested as a Companion of the Order of the Indian Empire (CIE) in the 1934 New Year Honours list and knighted in the 1941 New Year Honours list. Government of India issued a postal stamp on his 101st birth anniversary with a denomination of Fifty paise

== Bibliography ==
- Anthelmintics and their Uses in Medical and Veterinary Practice. The Williams & Wilkins Company. 1928.
- Chopra's Indigenous Drugs of India. Academic Publishers. 1958.
