= List of Jadavpur University people =

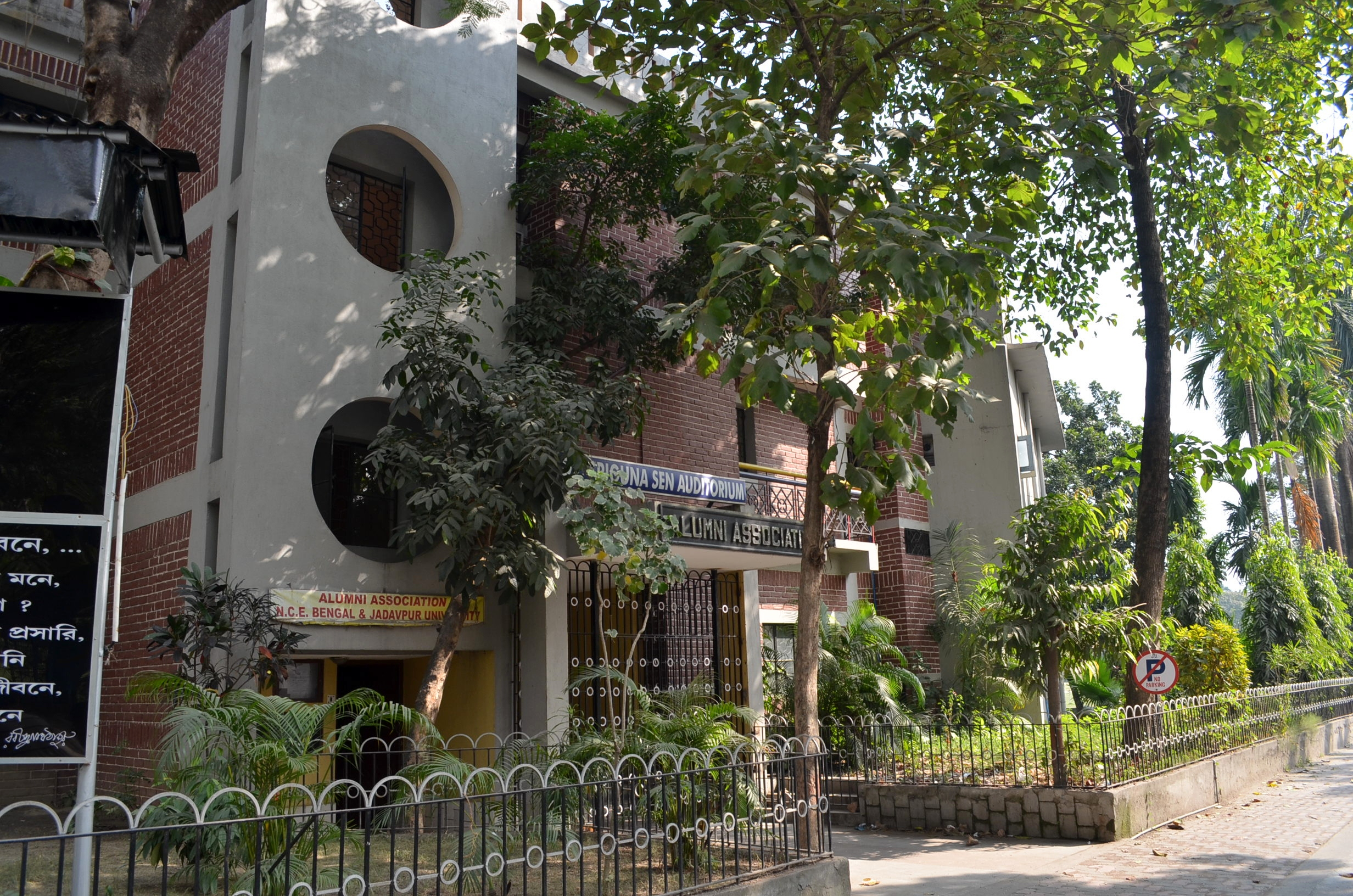
The Alumni Association of Jadavpur University

The following is a list of notable people who have studied from or taught in Jadavpur University.

== Notable alumni ==
=== Researchers, engineers and academic personalities on Science ===
- Abhik Ghosh, inorganic chemist and materials scientist, faculty at University of Tromsø in Tromsø, Norway
- Alok Krishna Gupta, mineralogist, petrologist, Shanti Swarup Bhatnagar Prize for Science and Technology awardee, former Raja Ramanna Fellow of the Department of Atomic Energy, Government of India
- Amitabha Mukhopadhyay, cell biologist, Shanti Swarup Bhatnagar laureate, professor at the National Institute of Immunology
- Aninda Sinha, Professor at Center for High Energy Physics, Indian Institute of Science
- Bandula Wijay, Professor of Clinical Medicine at the Kotelawala Defense University
- Bimal Kumar Bachhawat, neurochemist and glycobiologist, known for his discovery of HMG-CoA lyase, awarded with Padma Bhushan
- Chinmoy Sankar Dey, faculty at IIT Delhi
- Debabrata Goswami, chemist, elected Fellow of the Royal Society of Chemistry, Fellow of the Institute of Physics, the SPIE, and The Optical Society, senior Member of the IEEE, faculty at IIT Kanpur
- Dipankar Chatterji Indian molecular biologist, Shanti Swarup Bhatnagar laureate
- Ipsita Biswas, terminal ballistics scientist, awarded with India's highest civilian award for women, the "Narishakti Puruskar", faculty at Molecular Biophysics Unit, Indian Institute of Science
- K. S. Dasgupta, former director of the Indian Institute of Space Science and Technology
- Kinshuk Dasgupta, Materials Scientist at Bhabha Atomic Research Centre, Mumbai, Shanti Swarup Bhatnagar laureate
- Manoj Majee, molecular biologist, N-Bios laureate and a senior scientist at the National Institute of Plant Genome Research (NIPGR)
- Monita Chatterjee, auditory scientist at Boys Town National Research Hospital
- Nandita Basu, researcher at University of Waterloo in the field of Water Sustainability and Ecohydrology
- Nibir Mandal, structural geologist, Shanti Swarup Bhatnagar laureate, faculty of Geological sciences at Jadavpur University
- Partha Sarathi Mukherjee, inorganic chemist, Shanti Swarup Bhatnagar laureate
- Palash Sarkar, cryptologist, mathematician, awarded with Shanti Swarup Bhatnagar
- Pinaki Majumdar, condensed matter physicist, Shanti Swarup Bhatnagar laureate
- Prabhat Mishra, Professor of Computer Science at the University of Florida, elected Fellow of the Institute of Electrical and Electronics Engineers (IEEE), elected Fellow of the American Association for the Advancement of Science (AAAS)
- Pran Ranjan Sengupta, mathematician
- Pulak Sengupta, petrologist, Shanti Swarup Bhatnagar laureate
- Rajdeep Dasgupta, professor of Earth, Environmental, and Planetary Sciences at Rice University
- Samir Das, professor of computer science at Stony Brook University
- Samaresh Bhattacharya, inorganic chemist, Shanti Swarup Bhatnagar laureate
- Sandeep Shukla, faculty at Indian Institute of Technology, Kanpur
- Santanu Bose, Associate Professor, National School of Drama, (NSD) New Delhi
- Sarit Kumar Das, professor of the department of mechanical engineering at Indian Institute of Technology Madras
- Sayan Mitra, professor in the department of Electrical and Computer Engineering at University of Illinois at Urbana-Champaign (UIUC)
- Shantanu Chowdhury, structural biologist, Shanti Swarup Bhatnagar and N-BIOS laureates
- Shehla Pervin, breast cancer specialist
- Shireen Akhter, Bengali academic in University of Chittagong
- Snehasikta Swarnakar, cancer biologist, N-Bios laureate
- Somnath Dasgupta, professor of metamorphic geology at Indian Institute of Science Education and Research, Kolkata
- Souvik Maiti, biochemist, Shanti Swarup Bhatnagar and N-BIOS laureate, faculty at the Institute of Genomics and Integrative Biology
- Subrata Adak, chemical biologist, N-Bios laureate
- Subrata Roy, professor, inventor, scientist
- Suman Chakraborty, Director of IIT Kharagpur (2025–present)
- Sunil Kumar Manna, immunologist, N-Bios laureate
- Suvendra Nath Bhattacharyya, molecular biologist, Shanti Swarup Bhatnagar and N-BIOS laureate
- Syed Samsuddin Ahmed, founder and vice chancellor of Bangamata Sheikh Fojilatunnesa Mujib Science & Technology University
- Suman Chakraborty, faculty and Director of IIT Kharagpur
- Sushanta Mitra, mechanical engineer, elected fellow of the American Society of Mechanical Engineers, the Canadian Academy of Engineering, the Engineering Institute of Canada, Royal Society of Chemistry, the American Physical Society, and American Association for the Advancement of Science
- Tamal Dey, professor of Mathematics and Computer science at Purdue University
- Ujjwal Maulik, Computer Scientist and professor, First Faculty member in Jadavpur University to be elected IEEE Fellow

=== Academic personalities other than science and engineering ===
- Barnita Bagchi, faculty of literary studies at Utrecht University, historian
- Chinmoy Guha, professor in English at University of Calcutta
- Himani Bannerji, faculty in department of Sociology, York University in Canada
- Julie Mehta, faculty at University of Toronto
- Nandini Das, professor of Early Modern Literature and Culture in the English faculty at the University of Oxford
- Swapan Kumar Chakravorty, humanities faculty at Presidency University
- Amitava Chattopadhyay, faculty and Professor of Marketing at INSEAD
- Sugato Chakravarty, Professor at Purdue University
- Tithi Bhattacharya, Professor of South Asian History at Purdue University
- Jisnu Basu, Engineer, Saha Institute of Nuclear Physics
- Joyashree Roy, Economist, Distinguished Professor at Asian Institute of Technology

=== Organizational heads ===
- Amitabha Bhattacharyya, former director of the Indian Institute of Technology, Kanpur
- Arundhati Bhattacharya, first woman chairperson of State Bank of India
- Chinmoy Guha, former vice-Chancellor of Rabindra Bharati University
- Dipak K. Das, former director of the Cardiovascular Research Center at the University of Connecticut Health Center in Farmington
- Jonathan Anthony Mason, former Headmaster of St. James' School, Kolkata, the Modern High School in Dubai, and the Doon School, former House Master at La Martiniere College, Kolkata and former principal at St. James' School, Kolkata
- K. S. Dasgupta, former director of the Indian Institute of Space Science and Technology
- Mohd. Rafiqul Alam Beg, former vice chancellor of Rajshahi University of Engineering & Technology
- Pinaki Majumdar, director of the Harish-Chandra Research Institute
- Ramaranjan Mukherji, former chancellor of Rashtriya Sanskrit Vidyapeeth, Padma Shri recipient
- Saroj Ghose, former director of Birla Industrial & Technological Museum and former director general of the National Council of Science Museums, Government of India, former President of the International Council of Museums in Paris during 1992–98
- Sarit Kumar Das, former director at IIT Ropar
- Sivaji Bandyopadhyay, director of National Institute of Technology Silchar
- Shireen Akhter, first female vice chancellor of the University of Chittagong in University of Chittagong
- Somnath Dasgupta, former vice-chancellor of Assam University
- Subir Raha, former Director of Oil and Natural Gas Corporation
- Rajat K Baisya, Former Head and Dean of Management Sciences, IIT, Delhi
- Sunil Kumar Manna, former head of the immunology lab of the Centre for DNA Fingerprinting and Diagnostics
- Syed Samsuddin Ahmed, founder and vice chancellor of Bangamata Sheikh Fojilatunnesa Mujib Science & Technology University

=== Literature personalities ===
- Anil Ghorai, poet, novelist and writer
- Hayat Mamud, Bangladeshi essayist, poet
- Himani Bannerji, writer, sociologist, scholar
- Kajal Bandyopadhyay, poet
- Kunal Basu, English friction writer
- Mimi Mondal, Writer
- Nabaneeta Dev Sen, writer
- Neel Mukherjee, novelist
- Ramaranjan Mukherji, writer
- Ramkumar Mukhopadhyay, writer
- Riksundar Banerjee, writer
- Rohini Chowdhury, writer and literary translator
- Sibaji Bandyopadhyay, author and critic
- Sudhir Chakraborty, educationist and essayist

=== Music and cine personalities ===
- Anasuya Sengupta, actress and production designer
- Anupam Roy, singer and film music director
- Arnab Ray, blogger and author
- Badal Sarkar, dramatist and theatre director
- Bidita Bag, actress
- Churni Ganguly, film and television actress
- Debalina Majumder, documentary director
- Fazle Hasan Shishir, film director, producer
- Hemanta Mukherjee, Playback Singer, composer, Music Director, producer, Film Director
- Indrasis Acharya, Filmmaker
- Jayant Kripalani, film, television and stage actor, director and trainer
- Kabir Suman, singer, songwriter and Music Composer
- Kalika Prasad Bhattacharya, Indian folk singer
- Kamalini Mukherji, Indian Rabindrasangeet vocalist
- Kaushik Ganguly, Indian film director
- Kaushiki Chakraborty, Hindustani classical vocalist
- Kushal Chakraborty, singer and film director
- Moon Moon Sen, actress
- Moushumi Bhowmik, singer, songwriter
- Onir, Indian film and TV director
- Parambrata Chatterjee, actor
- Payel Sarkar, actress
- Payel Sarkar, Indian actress
- Ranjan Ghosh, filmmaker
- Ranjon Ghoshal, theatre director and musician
- Ritabhari Chakraborty, actress
- Rituparno Ghosh, film director, actor
- Robiul Alam Robi, film director
- Ruchira Panda, Indian classical vocalist
- Rwitobroto Mukherjee, film and theatre actor
- Santanu Bose, Indian-theatre director and drama teacher
- Saroj Ghose, former director of Birla Industrial and Technological Museum
- Shiboprosad Mukherjee, filmmaker, writer, actor
- Solanki Roy, actress
- Suhel Seth, actor
- Swapan Chaudhuri, tabla player
- Swastika Mukherjee, actress
- Ujaan Ganguly, film and theatre actor

=== Politicians ===
- Manabendra Nath Roy, political activist, He was Founder of the Mexican Communist Party and the Communist Party of India.
- Amitabh Bagchi, senior Politburo member of Communist Party of India (Maoist), one of the founders of Central Organising Committee, Communist Party of India (Marxist–Leninist) Party Unity.
- Mohammed Salim, politician from Communist Party of India (Marxist).
- Sankar Gupta, former MLA from Communist Party of India (Marxist).
- Sujan Chakraborty, former MLA from Communist Party of India (Marxist).
- Gobinda Chandra Naskar, former MLA and MP from Indian National Congress and MLA from All India Trinamool Congress.
- Abhijit Mukherjee, former MP from Indian National Congress.

=== Judiciary ===
- Barnita Bagchi, feminist advocate

=== Businessmen ===
- Amitava Chattopadhyay, businessman at GlaxoSmithKline
- Bandula Wijay,
- Rubana Huq, chairperson of Bangladeshi conglomerate "Mohammadi Group"
- Suhel Seth, businessman

=== Journalists ===
- Ananta Charan Sukla, the founding editor of Journal of Comparative Literature and Aesthetics
- Julie Mehta
- Nayan Chanda, founder and editor-in-chief of YaleGlobal Online, online magazine from Yale Center for the Study of Globalization
- Paulami Sengupta, executive editor of Bengali magazines under ABP House in India

=== Others ===
- Pritha Sen, food historian and former journalist
- Kurchi Dasgupta, painter, art critic, actor and translator
- Mohit Ray, environmental and human rights activist
- Benu Dasgupta, Indian cricketer
- Kalyan Dhal, cricketer and selector (CAB)
- Judhajit Mukherjee, cricketer/coach and IT professional
- Amitav Banerjee, cricketer/coach
- Nilambar Saha, cricketer and coach
- Damayanti Sen, Indian Police Service (IPS) officer of 1996 West Bengal cadre

== Notable faculty ==
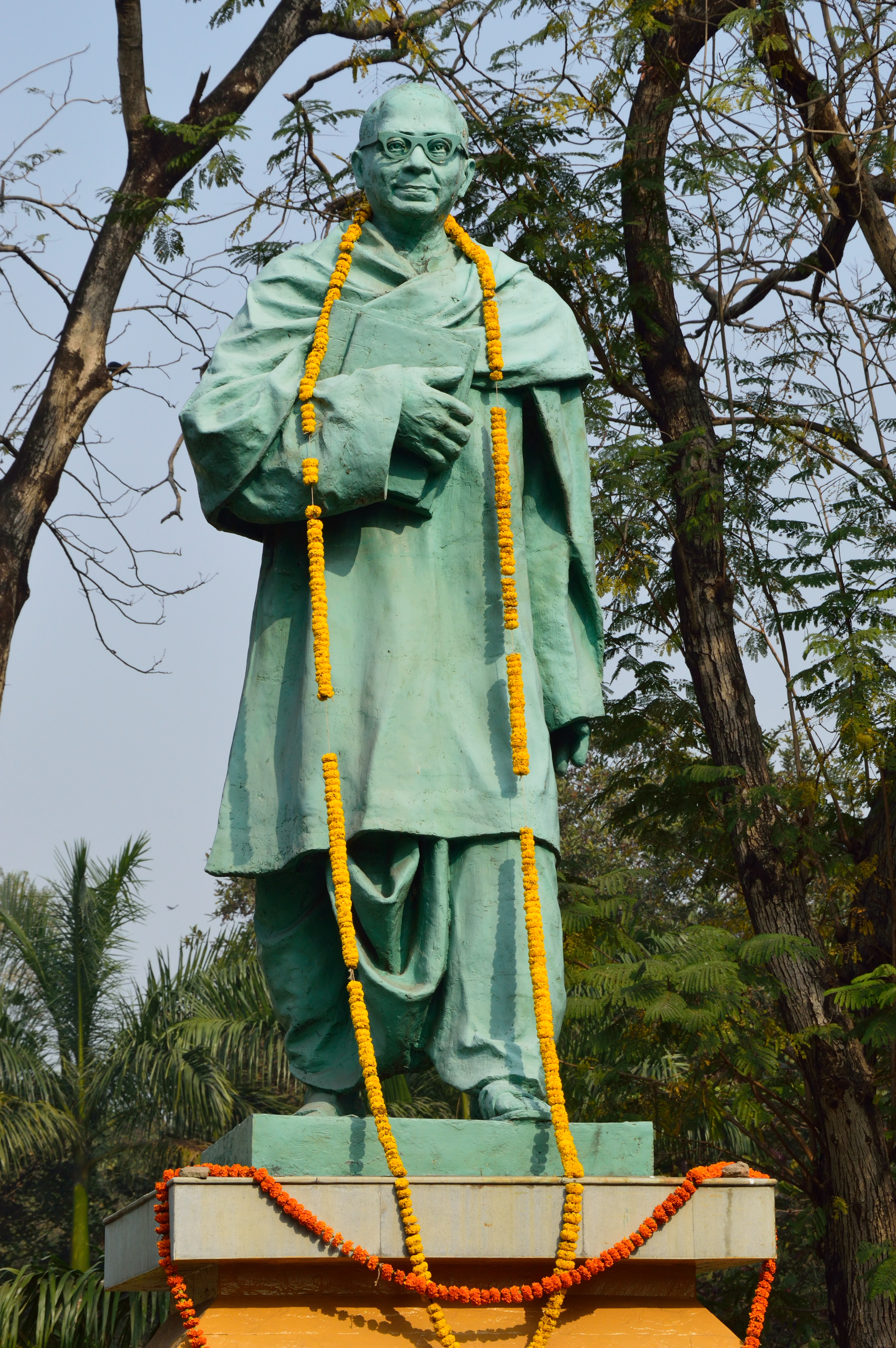
Triguna Sen, first vice-chancellor of Jadavpur University

This following list shows notable people, who have been a faculty in Jadavpur University, formerly or currently.

=== Faculty of Engineering and Technology ===
- Triguna Sen, first Vice-Chancellor of Jadavpur University (from 1956 to 1966)
- Amar Nath Bhaduri, molecular enzymologist and chemical biologist, professor in Department of Pharmaceutical Technology (1966-1986)
- Amitabha Bhattacharyya, founder and professor of Department of Production Engineering and professor in Department of Mechanical Engineering
- Ujjwal Maulik, professor in Department of Computer Science and Engineering
- Paritosh Sen, professor of School of Printing Technology (1956–79)
- Sankar Sen, former vice chancellor of Jadavpur University, professor of electrical engineering
- Sivaji Bandyopadhyay, former Dean of Faculty of Engineering and Technology at Jadavpur University, professor in Department of Computer Science and Engineering, director of the Computer-Aided Design Centre
- Tathagata Roy, founder and professor of Department of construction engineering
- Pulok Mukherjee, professor (on lien) of Pharmaceutical technology
- Kunal Roy, DTC Laboratory, Professor of Pharmaceutical Technology
- Nandini Mukherjee, former Head of department of computer science and engineering and politician

=== Faculty of Science ===
- Department of Geology
  - Subir Kumar Ghosh, emeritus professor of Department of Geology (1967-1997)
  - Nibir Mandal, structural geologist and a professor of Geological Sciences
  - Pulak Sengupta, professor of Department of Geological Sciences
  - Subhrangsu Kanta Acharyya, professor in Department of Geology
  - Subir Kumar Ghosh, emeritus professor in Department of Geology
  - Sudipta Sengupta, professor in Department of Geology
- Department of Chemistry
  - Deb Shankar Ray, lecturer of chemistry (1984-1986)

=== Faculty of Arts ===
- Department of Bengali
  - Shankha Ghosh
  - Alokeranjan Dasgupta, taught competitive literature and Bengali (1957-1971)
  - Sushil Kumar De, head Department of Bengali post 1947
  - Ajit Dutta, professor of Bengali (1957-1971)
- Department of Economics
  - Amartya Sen, Nobel laureate, founder professor of Department of Economics, Jadavpur University in 1956
  - Mrinal Datta Chaudhuri, worked in Department of Economics (1966-1968)
  - Sugata Marjit, worked in Department of Economics (1985-1993)
  - Ajitava Raychaudhuri, Professor Emeritus of Department of Economics
- Department of History
  - Amalendu De, professor of History
- Department of Comparative Literature
  - Buddhadeva Bose, set up the Department of Comparative Literature in 1956
  - David McCutchion, professor in Department of Comparative Literature
  - Robert Antoine, lecture in Department of Comparative Literature (1956 onwards)
- Department of English
  - Rimi B. Chatterjee, professor of English literature (2004- incumbent)
  - Rabindra Kumar Das Gupta, reader in English (1958-1960)
  - Supriya Chaudhuri, Professor Emerita of Department of English
  - Swapan Kumar Chakravorty, Professor of English
  - Amlan Das Gupta, Professor of English
  - Ananda Lal, Professor of English
  - Malini Bhattacharya, retired professor of English and former director, School of Women's Studies and politician
  - Paromita Chakravarti, Professor of English

=== Faculty of Interdisciplinary Studies ===
- Amita Chatterjee, professor emerita at the School of Cognitive Science of Jadavpur University (1979- 2010)
- Jasodhara Bagchi, founder-director, and emeritus professor of the School of Women's Studies (1988-1997)
- Sukanta Chaudhuri, founder-director of the School of Cultural Texts and Records and professor (1991-2010)
- Samita Sen, Dean of the Faculty of Interdisciplinary Studies at Jadavpur University (2016 to 2018), professor of women's studies
