= Bharat Bhushan (disambiguation) =

Bharat Bhushan (1920–1992) was an Indian actor, scriptwriter and producer.

Bharat Bhushan may also refer to:

- Bharat Bhushan (academic), American professor of bio/nanotechnology and biomimetics
- Bharat Bhushan (yogi) (born 1952), Indian yoga guru and author

== See also ==
- Bharat Bhushan Aggarwal, Indian-American biochemist
