= Julie Mehta =

Indian academic and writer

Julie B. Mehta is an Indian author and journalist. She teaches at University College, University of Toronto. Her course, Asian Cultures in Canada, is endowed by Chancellor Emerita Senator Vivienne Poy. Mehta is an author and journalist specializing in Southeast Asia.

== Early life and education ==
Mehta holds a master's degree and Ph.D. in English Literature and South Asian Studies and is a gold medallist from Jadavpur University, Calcutta. At the Centre for South Asian Studies at the University of Toronto, her Ph.D. dissertation is titled "Retrieving Precolonial Identity through the Images of the Divine Feminine in Waterscapes of Postcolonial Fiction."

== Personal life ==
She is married to journalist and author Harish C. Mehta.

== Published works ==
- Hun Sen: Strongman of Cambodia co-authored with Harish C. Mehta (Graham Brash, 1999)
- Dance of Life: The Mythology, History, and Politics of Cambodian Culture (Graham Brash, 2001)
- Bangkok: A Walk Through the Market. Bangkok: A&M Media, 2002.

=== Translation for theatre ===
- Member, Translation Unit, Pleiades Theatre, Toronto: Translated Rabindranath Tagore's play, The Post Office, from Bengali to English. The play was performed in Toronto between 7 May and 4 June 2011, as the Year of India in Canada celebrations.

=== Book chapters ===
- "Ondaatje’s Impertinent Voices: Tracking Family Ties to Remember History." In Australasia-Asia: Change, Conflict and Convergence. Ed. Cynthia van den Dreissen. Swan-Longmans, 2010.
- "Reconfiguring the Feminine: The Real, Reel, and Riel Life of Neang Seda (Sita) in the Khmer Ramayana." In The International Ramayana Collection. Ed Gauri Krishnan, National Heritage Board, Singapore, 2010.
- "Rabindranath Tagore’s Global Soul: In Flight between Nationalism and Liberalism." Ed. Kathleen O’Connel and Joseph O’Connel. Vishwabharati University, Kolkata, India, Special Issue, 2009.
- "Being Gaijin and Being Female in the Sakoku Culture of Japan: Cultural Exile in Meira Chand’s The Gossamer Fly." In Writing Asia: The Literatures in Englishes. Volume 1: From the Inside. Ed. Edwin Thumboo, Ethos Books, Singapore, 2007.
- "Cultural Collision in the Waterscapes of Amitav Ghosh’s The Hungry Tide." In L’eau et les mondes indiens (Water and the Indian Worlds), under the aegis of SARI, Jonzac, France, 2007.
- "The Ramayana in Thai and Khmer Culture." Chapter in Ramayana Revisited. Ed. Mandakranta Bose. New York: Oxford University Press, 2004.
