= Sunil Kumar Manna =

Indian immunologist (born 1968)

- Born: 27 August 1968 (age 58); West Bengal, India
- Education: University of Calcutta; Indian Institute of Chemical Biology; Jadavpur University; University of Texas MD Anderson Cancer Center
- Known for: Studies on apoptosis in cancer
- Awards: 2009 N-BIOS Prize
- Scientific career
- Fields: Immunobiology
- Workplaces: Centre for DNA Fingerprinting and Diagnostics
- Doctoral advisor: Bharat Aggarwal

Sunil Kumar Manna (27 August 1968) is an Indian immunologist and the head of the immunology lab of the Centre for DNA Fingerprinting and Diagnostics. He is known for his studies on cell signaling and apoptosis. The Department of Biotechnology of the Government of India awarded him the National Bioscience Award for Career Development, one of the highest Indian science awards, for his contributions to biosciences, in 2009.

== Biography ==
Sunil Kumar Manna, born on 27 August 1968, pursued his post-graduate education at the University of Calcutta and after earning an MSc, he did his doctoral research at the Indian Institute of Chemical Biology which secured him a PhD from Jadavpur University. His post-doctoral work was at the University of Texas MD Anderson Cancer Center under the guidance of Bharat Aggarwal and on his return to India, he was reportedly offered a faculty position at the Presidency University which he declined to take up a position at the Centre for DNA Fingerprinting and Diagnostics, where he serves as the head of the Lab of Immunology. His research focus is in the field of immunology and he is known to have carried out work on Cytokine mediated immunoregulation as well as apoptosis in cancer. His studies have been documented by way of a number of articles and ResearchGate, an online repository of scientific articles has listed 115 of them. He also holds a patent for an anticancer agent, jointly developed by him.

The Department of Biotechnology (DBT) of the Government of India awarded him the National Bioscience Award for Career Development, one of the highest Indian science awards in 2009. He resides in Nacharam, a suburb of Hyderabad in the south Indian state of Telangana.

== Controversy ==
In 2012, a Japanese scientist accused Manna of plagiarism with regard to some of the images used by him in one of his articles published in the Journal of Biological Chemistry. Two of his articles were immediately retracted, and some were corrected, leading to seven of his papers being finally retracted. He was suspended from his job, after the institute found prima facie evidence against him but he was later reinstated.
