= Syed Samsuddin Ahmed =

Bangladeshi academic

- সৈয়দ সামসুদ্দিন আহমেদ
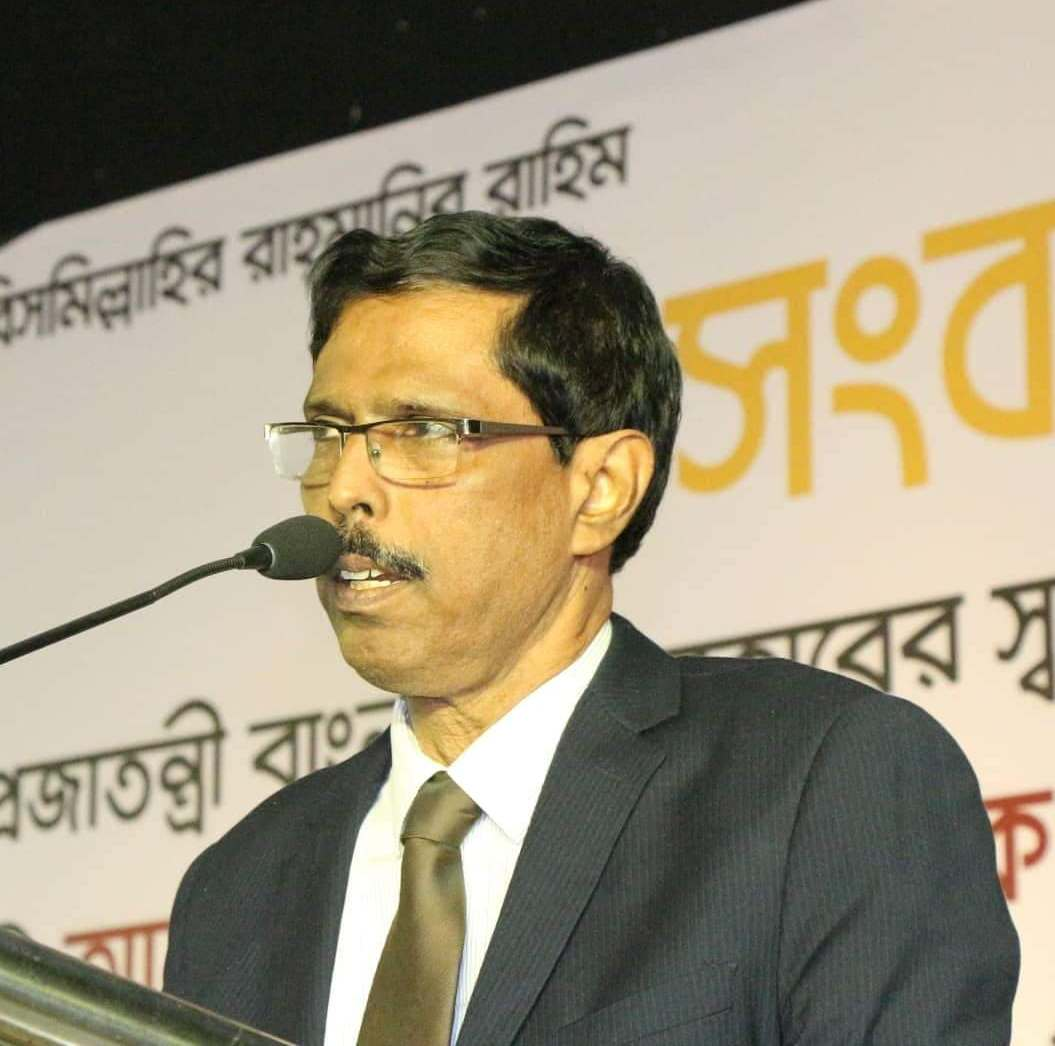
- Syed Samsuddin Ahmed

Vice Chancellor of the UoB
- Incumbent
- Assumed office 2 February 2024

Vice Chancellor of the BSFMSTU
- In office 19 November 2018 – 22 November 2022

Personal details
- Born: Rajshahi District
- Education: Ph.D
- Occupation: Academic

Syed Samsuddin Ahmed is a prominent academic from Bangladesh. He is the founder vice chancellor of Bangamata Sheikh Fojilatunnesa Mujib Science & Technology University (BSFMSTU). Prior to this position, Ahmed worked as a senior professor of the Department of Geology and Mining at University of Rajshahi and also served in different academic, administrative, and co-curricular development activities at the University of Rajshahi.

== Early life and education ==
Ahmed graduated, in 1979, and earned a master's degree, in 1980, from the Department of Geology and Mining at University of Rajshahi and a PhD in 1993 from Jadavpur University.

== Career ==
In 1983, Ahmed joined as a faculty member in the department of Geology and Mining at University of Rajshahi. He has long-held experience in university administration including as chairman of the department of Geology and Mining at University of Rajshahi, Provost of the Madar Bux Hall, University of Rajshahi, member of Rajshahi University Senate and Syndicate, and the administrator of Rajshahi University Press. He was the director of the Barapukuria Coal Mining Company Limited, Dinajpur, Bangladesh.

== Professional affiliations ==
- Life Member, Geological Society of Bangladesh
- Member, Bangladesh Association for the Advancement of Science
- Associate Member, Third World Academy of Science
- Life Member, National Environmental Science Academy, New Delhi, India

== Research and publications ==
Ahmed has published 52 scientific papers, mostly in international journals.
