= Ramaranjan Mukherji =

Indian writer, academic, and Indologist (1928–2010)

- Born: 1 January 1928; Kolkata, West Bengal, India
- Died: 13 March 2010 (aged 82)
- Occupations: Academician, writer
- Awards: Padma Shri; Hiroshima Peace Award; Government of India Certificate of Honour; Viswa Bharati Award
- Website: Official web site

Ramaranjan Mukherji (1 January 1928 – 13 March 2010) was an Indian writer, academic, Indologist and a former chancellor of Rashtriya Sanskrit Vidyapeetha, known for his scholarship in Sanskrit literature. He was honored by the Government of India, in 2010, with the fourth highest Indian civilian award of Padma Shri.

== Biography ==
Ramaranjan Mukherji was born on 1 January 1928 in Kolkata in the Indian state of West Bengal. He graduated (BA) in 1944 and in 1946 secured a post graduate degree in Sanskrit, both from the University of Calcutta. Later, he obtained the doctoral degree of PhD from the same university (University of Calcutta) in 1953. He also secured the degree of Doctor of Literature, in 1964, from the Jadavpur University.

Mukherji started his career as a lecturer at Calcutta University but moved to Jadavpur University in 1956 to join the Department of Sanskrit there where he eventually became the Head of the department. During his tenure there, he is reported to have been successful in establishing the Department of Special Assistance, (DSA Sanskrit) at the university. In 1970, he was appointed as the vice chancellor of the University of Burdwan, a post he held till 1984. The next three years were spent at Rabindra Bharati University as its vice chancellor and retired from there in 1987. During this period, he was a member of the standing committee and later the president of the Association of Indian Universities and served as a member of the standing committee of the Association of Commonwealth Universities. He was also a former chancellor of Rashtriya Sanskrit Vidyapeetha. His contributions are reported behind the establishments of educational institutions such as Sri Sitaram Vaidic Adarsha Sanskrit Mahavidyalaya, a Rashtriya Sanskrit Sansthan affiliated college of oriental studies, Bhirbhum Institute of Engineering and Technology, Calcutta Institute of Engineering and Management, Kolkata and a law college in Kolkata. He served as the president of Sri Sri Sitaramadas Omkarnath Samskrita Siksha Samsad, a cultural organization and was the patron of the Institute of Education Research and Development. He also visited many countries as a member of the Indian delegation.

Mukherji authored several books and articles. Some of his notable works are:

- Imagery in poetry: an Indian approach
- Corpus of Indological Studies
- Global Aesthetics and Sanskrit Poetics
- Rashtriya Sanskrit Sansthan
- Vyaktiviveka of Rajanaka Mahimbhatta

Ramaranjan Mukherji died on 13 March 2010 due to old age illnesses. Several books such as Hey Mahajibana and Kabita Sangraha have been published in memory of Mukherji.

== Awards and recognitions ==
Ramaranjan Mukherji, a former emeritus fellow of the Ministry of Human Resource Development, has received Hiroshima Peace Award and a Certificate of Honour from the Government of India. The Government of Uttar Pradesh conferred on him the Viswa Bharati Award while the government of India awarded him the civilian honour of Padma Shri, but his death preceded the investiture ceremony.
