= Damayanti Sen =

Indian police officer (born 1970)

- Police career
- Country: India
- Department: West Bengal Police; Kolkata Police Force
- Service years: 1996 - present
- Rank: ADGP
- Badge no.: 19961006
- Batch: 1996
- Cadre: West Bengal
- Awards: Police Medal (2014)

Damayanti Sen (born 13 January 1970) is an Indian Police Service officer of the 1996 intake from the West Bengal cadre. She holds the rank of Additional Director General of Police in West Bengal Police.

== Birth and education ==
She was born in Kolkata, West Bengal on 13 January 1970. She earned her B.A. and M.A degree in Economics from Jadavpur University.

== Career ==
She was appointed as probation officer in Kolkata since 1996. Sen was earlier served as Deputy commissioner of police in North, Central zone and Detective department in Kolkata Police. Sen was the first female joint commissioner of police in Kolkata Police.

Sen was transferred to WBP in different departments at Swami Vivekananda State Police Academy, Barrackpore, Darjeeling division, Barrackpore PC and Criminal Investigation Department.

In 2022, Chief Justice Prakash Srivastava and Justice Rajarshi Bharadwaj of the Calcutta High Court's Division Bench issued an order designating Sen to lead the inquiry into the four rape cases in Deganga, Matia, Ingrezbazar, and Banshdroni.

In 2026, the newly formed West Bengal government of Suvendu Adhikari, appointed her as a member of the West Bengal panel on crimes against women, led by retired Justice Samapti Chatterjee. The commission would be tasked with investigating crimes against women and children as well as minority communities.

== 2012 Park Street rape case ==
In 2012, she successfully resolved the investigation regarding the alleged rape of an Anglo-Indian woman Suzette Jordan in a moving car at Park Street. Even though Chief Minister Mamata Banerjee dismissed the incident as fabricated, her team arrested three people and confirmed that the mother of two had indeed been raped. Following the cases conclusion, Damayanti Sen was alleged to have been sidelined by the government, not being entrusted with any major case. It was only in 2022, when the Calcutta High Court, acting suo motu, entrusted her with investigating four rape cases, as well as the Rasika Jain death mystery.
