= Somnath Dasgupta =

Professor Somnath Dasagupta (born 1951) was the Vice-Chancellor of Assam University till 13 November 2015 and professor of metamorphic geology at Indian Institutes of Science Education and Research, Kolkata.

== Career ==
Professor Dasgupta had his bachelor's degree in geological sciences from Jadavpur University in the year 1971. From the same institute he completed his master's degree in applied geology in 1974 and PhD in 1979 titled "A study of the geology and ore mineralisation along the Madan Kudan - Kolihan section, Khetri Copper Belt, Rajasthan, India". He served Geological Survey of India for four years. He joined Jadavpur University as faculty in 1981. He shifted to Indian Institutes of Science Education and Research, Kolkata in 2009. He is having several post-doctoral research with the collaboration of different international institution, like Hokkaido University, Japan (1984–85), at the University of Bonn, Germany (1991–92, 1996, 1997) and at Ruhr University of Bochum, Germany (2002–03, 2006, 2008). He was the director of National Centre of Experimental Mineralogy & Petrology, University of Allahabad from August 2010 to July 2011 and dean of Research & Development, Indian Institute of Science Education & Research, Kolkata, from April to June 2012. He is distinguished visiting professor at Indian Institute of Technology Bombay. He took over as fifth vice-chancellor of Assam University, Silchar.

== Other contributions ==
He has co-edited three books. These are Geological Society of London Special Publication No. 119 (1997), Geological Society of London Special Publication No. 206 (2003), and Physics & Chemistry of the Earth's Interior, published by the Indian National Science Academy and Springer-Verlag (2009). He was co-editor of four special issues of different journals. He developed software for Teaching Petrology in the 21st Century (American Geophysical Union). He was the International Leader of UNESCO-IGCP Project 318 on Polymetallic Deposits (1992–95) and coordinated international research activities. He served as a member of Project Monitoring Committees of CSIR and DST, and co-ordinates research cooperation between India and Germany as an Honorary Advisor of DAAD. Dasgupta is a member of INSA Council since 2009.

== Awards ==
Professor Dasgupta is the recipient of several national and international awards which are listed below:

=== National ===
1. Recipient of University Gold Medal, 1974
2. Recipient of P.N. Bose Medal from Jadavpur University, 1974
3. Recipient of N.N. Chatterjee Medal from the Asiatic Society, Calcutta, 1979
4. Recipient of Career Award by the University Grants Commission in 1988
5. Recipient of Krishnan Medal from the Indian Geophysical Union, 1989
6. Recipient of National Mineral Award from the Government of India, 1996
7. Recipient of J.C. Bose Fellowship from the Department of Science & Technology, Government of India in 2007

=== International ===
1. Recipient of Post Doctoral Fellowship from the Government of Japan, 1984–85
2. Recipient of Fellowship from the Alexander von Humboldt Foundation 1991–92, 1997, 2006, 2008, 2011
3. Awarded Mercator Guest Professorship by the German Research Foundation, 2002–03
4. Awarded Visiting Professorship by Hokkaido University, 2007
