= Amitava Chattopadhyay =

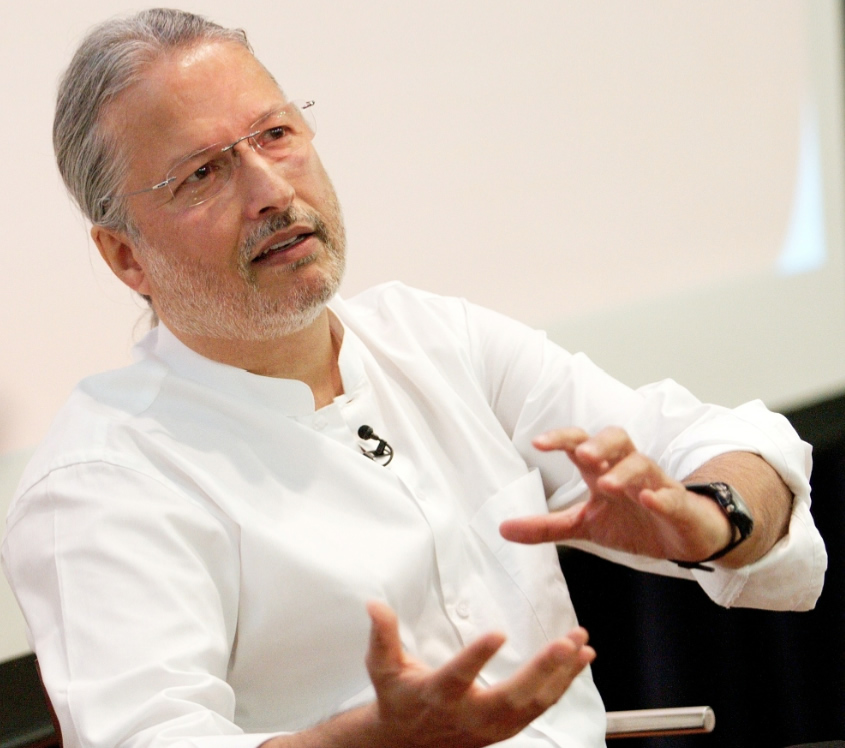
- Sharing Branding and Innovation learnings with executives
- Born: 5 July 1956 (age 69); Calcutta (Kolkata), India
- Occupations: Professor, Consultant, Author
- Known for: New Emerging Market Multinationals (Book)
- Website: amitavac.com

Amitava Chattopadhyay (born 5 July 1956) is the GlaxoSmithKline Chaired Professor in Corporate Innovation — Professor of Marketing at INSEAD, Fellow of the Institute on Asian Consumer Insights, and Senior Fellow at the Ernst & Young Institute for Emerging Market Studies.

Professor Chattopadhyay is an authority on brand management and the author of the award-winning book, The New Emerging Market Multinationals: Four Strategies for Disrupting Markets and Building Brands.

Over the past three decades, he has published more than 60 articles, with the majority appearing in leading international journals such as the Journal of Marketing Research, Journal of Consumer Research, Journal of Marketing, Journal of Consumer Psychology, Marketing Science (journal), Management Science (journal), International Journal of Research in Marketing, and Long Range Planning.

Prof. Chattopadhyay is on the editorial review boards of the Journal of Marketing, Journal of Consumer Psychology, International Journal of Research in Marketing, Journal of the Academy of Marketing Science, and Long Range Planning. He has been on the advisory board of the Association for Consumer Research as well as the Association's board of directors. For his research, he has been the recipient of several awards, including the Robert Ferber Award.

Aside from degree programs, Chattopadhyay has taught in executive programs in Europe, North America, Australia, Asia, and Africa. He is on the advisory boards of several companies and a consultant to multinational firms.

== Early life and education ==
Amitava has been a nomad all his life. He studied in five different schools in India and the UK, where he graduated from high school from St. Gregory's Grammar School in Manchester, UK. Along the way he studied at Ballygunge Government High School (Kolkata), Don Bosco School, Park Circus, (Kolkata), Modern School (New Delhi), and in Swansea, UK.

He later studied Chemistry at Jadavpur University, a program from which he graduated at the top of his class in 1976, and went on to do his MBA (PGDP) from the Indian Institute of Management Ahmedabad, before heading off for his PhD in Marketing from the University of Florida in Gainesville, USA.

== Academic career ==
Amitava started his academic career at McGill University in Montreal, Canada. After eight years, the climate really got to him and he moved to the University of British Columbia in Vancouver, Canada. Five years on, INSEAD came calling and Amitava moved to INSEAD in 1999. Amitava started out in Fontainebleau but moved to the Singapore campus in 2005.

== Key areas of research & teaching ==
Amitava has been interested throughout his career in consumers—what they think, how they feel, and how they respond to the various initiatives of businesses as they try to position themselves in the minds of consumers.

Amitava's research has looked at how brands try to position themselves in consumers' minds through advertising, through word-of-mouth, through online platforms, through innovation in their product offerings, and through the use of various perceptual elements such as colors, visual aesthetics, music, and the like. His work on the one hand has investigated how firm initiatives influence consumers’ thoughts and feelings, and how these in turn influence their preferences and purchase decisions. On the other, his research has looked at how businesses can get better at developing the initiatives they target at customers through a variety of interventions in terms of the processes they follow and the tools they apply in generating consumer directed initiatives.

Most recently, Amitava has been struck by the rise of brand businesses from the emerging markets. International business theory has maintained that emerging market firms make and sell low-cost inexpensive products or supply products and services to branded goods players in the developed markets, who then sell these under their own brand to end consumers around the world. A good example of this model is Foxconn which makes many of the products that are sold under the Apple brand by Apple Inc. However, the new millennium has seen the emergence of branded goods players from the emerging markets who are successfully building global branded businesses. Consider Taiwan's HTC or China's Haier and Lenovo, or India's Tata Motors (think Jaguar Cars and Land Rover) or Infosys, or Turkey's TEMSA or Vitra, or Brazil's Natura and WEG Industries, or Mexico's Grupo Modelo (think Corona).

== Book ==
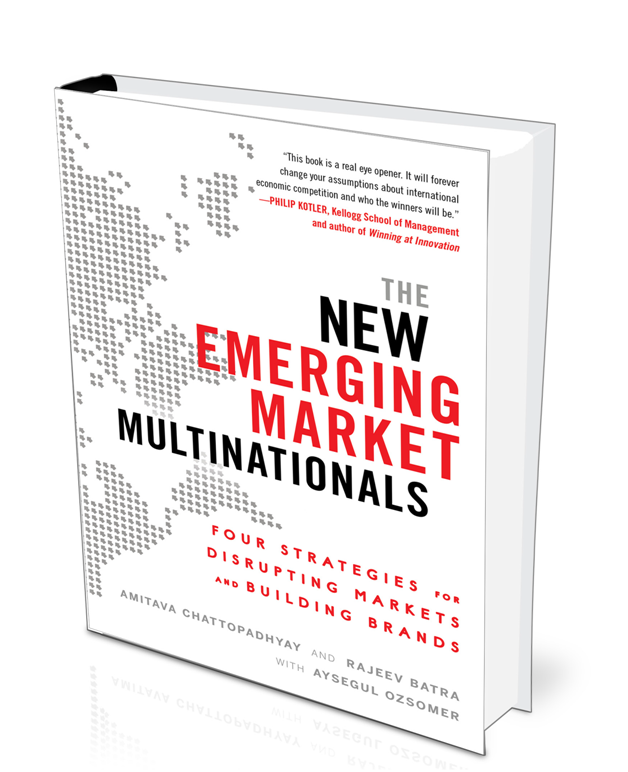

In 2012, Amitava published his first book with McGraw-Hill, titled The New Emerging Market Multinationals: Four Strategies for Disrupting Markets and Building Brands. The book is co-authored with Prof. Rajeev Batra (S.S. Kresge Professor of Marketing at the Ross School of Business at the University of Michigan), and Prof. Aysegul Ozsomer (Koç University, Istanbul, Turkey).

"The New Emerging Market Multinationals" is based on an in-depth study of 39 emerging market multinationals (EMNCs) that revealed innovative compete-from-below strategies and tactics fueling the meteoric rise of firms from countries such as India, China, Thailand, Turkey and Brazil.

The book was rated a top Strategy book of 2012 by Strategy+Business:

The New Emerging Market Multinationals is an important addition to the strategy bookshelf because it helps us understand the logic behind the rise of companies from emerging markets, including many new powerhouse firms in electronics, vehicles, services, healthcare, and other industries. The book serves a broader purpose as well, and reminds us of eternal strategic questions, such as how to identify, develop, and sustain a competitive advantage in crowded and unforgiving fields.

== Boards & advisory ==
- Associate editor, Journal of Consumer Psychology
- Area editor, International Journal of Research in Marketing
- Editorial review board, Journal of Consumer Research
- Editorial review board, Long Range Planning
- Board of directors, Association for Consumer Research (ACR)
