= Barnita Bagchi =

Indian academic

Barnita Bagchi (born 12 June 1973) is a Bengali-speaking Indian feminist advocate, historian, and literary scholar. She is a professor in English at the University of Amsterdam, and was previously a faculty member in literary studies at Utrecht University, and before that at the Institute of Development Studies, Kolkata at the University of Calcutta. She was educated at Jadavpur University, in Kolkata, St Hilda's College, Oxford, and at Trinity College, Cambridge.

She is a feminist historian, utopian studies scholar, literary scholar, and researcher of girls' and women's education and writing. She is also well-known also as translator and scholar of Bengali and South Asian feminist Begum Rokeya Sakhawat Hossain.

She is the daughter of economist Amiya Kumar Bagchi and feminist critic and activist Jasodhara Bagchi.

== Selected works ==
- Pliable Pupils and Sufficient Self-Directors: Narratives of Female Education by Five British Women Writers, 1778-1814 ISBN 81-85229-83-X (2004)
- Webs of History: Information, Communication, and Technology from Early to Post-Colonial India ISBN 81-7074-265-X (Co-ed., with Amiya Kumar Bagchi and Dipankar Sinha, 2005)
- Sultana’s Dream and Padmarag: Two Feminist Utopias, by Rokeya Sakhawat Hossain, part-translated and introduced by Barnita Bagchi ISBN 0-14-400003-2(2005)
- 'In Tarini Bhavan: Rokeya Sakhawat Hossains Padmarag und der Reichtum des südasiatischen Feminismus in der Förderung nicht konfessionsgebundener, den Geschlechtern gerecht werdender menschlicher Entwicklung', in Wie schamlos doch die Mädchen geworden sind! Bildnis von Rokeya Sakhawat Hossain ISBN 3-88939-835-9 ed. G.A. Zakaria (Berlin: IKO—Verlag fur Interkulturelle Kommunikation, 2006)
