= K. S. Dasgupta =

Indian scientist and academic

Kankar Shubra Dasgupta is an Indian scientist and academic who works in the field of image processing and satellite communications (SATCOM). He is serving as the Director of Dhirubhai Ambani Institute of Information and Communication Technology in Gandhinagar, Gujarat, India. Prior to joining DA-IICT, he served as the Director of Indian Institute of Space Science and Technology, Thiruvananthapuram. Dasgupta also served as the deputy director, Space Applications Centre, Ahmedabad and the Director of the Development and Educational Communication Unit of Indian Space Research Organisation.

== Education and career ==
K. S. Dasgupta received a B.E. in electronics and telecommunications and a master's degree in computer science from Jadavpur University, then a PhD in electrical engineering from the Indian Institute of Technology Bombay.

He joined Space Applications Centre (SAC), a research facility of Indian Space Research Organisation (ISRO), in 1974, working in the field of image processing and satellite communications. At SAC he led a team that developed various SATCOM applications including rural telephony and grid computation. He was also involved in the design and development of communication systems and payloads for geosynchronous satellite projects.

Dasgupta served as the Director of Development and Educational Communication Unit (DECU) Ahmedabad before he was appointed Director of the Indian Institute of Space Science and Technology (IIST) Thiruvananthapuram in December 2010. He is a recipient of the ISRO performance excellence award for the year 2009.
