= Jisnu Basu =

Bengali scientist

Jisnu Basu is a scientist and prominent personality of Department of Atomic Energy, Government of India. Basu acquired Ph.D. degree from Jadavpur University. He was involved with atomic research and development projects to advancements in nuclear physics and related technologies. He was also attached with Saha Institute of Nuclear Physics since 2001. Basu acts as a senior Rashtriya Swayamsevak Sangh functionary and media spokesperson in West Bengal. He is the general secretary of RSS, Bengal Unit.
