= Joyashree Roy =

Indian climatologist

Joyashree Roy is an Indian economist with specialization in the fields of Environmental economics, energy economics and Climate change mitigation.

She is a Professor of Economics in the Department of Economics, Jadavpur University, Kolkata, India. She is also the Inaugural Bangabandhu Chair Professor at the Asian Institute of Technology (AIT), Thailand. She joined AIT in the year 2018 under the Bangabandhu Chair on 'Sustainable Energy' at the Department of Energy, Environment, and Climate Change, School of Environment, Resources and Climate Change. The Bangabandhu Chair was officially inaugurated on March 15, 2018 following the signing of a letter of intent between the Asian Institute of Technology and the Ministry of Foreign Affairs of the Government of Bangladesh.

== Early life and education ==
She was born on 1 October 1957 in Shillong, in the state of Meghalaya (erstwhile in Assam), India.

Roy earned a doctorate degree from Jadavpur University and Master of Arts in Economics, from North Eastern Hill University (NEHU), Shillong, India. She is the National fellow of the Indian Council of Social Sciences Research (ICSSR), and Ford Foundation postdoctoral fellow at the Lawrence Berkeley National Laboratory.

Her research interests are in the vast areas of Sustainable Development such as Energy demand modeling, Economics of Pollution and Climate Change, Economy-wide modeling exercises for deriving policy implications, Water pricing & Modeling water quality demand, Accounting Natural resource, Valuing environmental services, Developmental and environmental issues in informal sectors, Evaluation of coastal ecosystem service, and Economy and Energy Policy of Bangladesh.

== Career ==
Joyashree Roy is the Founding advisor of the Global Change Programme at Jadavpur University, which focuses on climate change research and beyond. She has also initiated the Ryoichi Sasakawa Young Leaders Fellowship Fund (SYLFF) Project. She is one of the authors of the IPCC Fourth Assessment Report (2007), a panel which won the Nobel Peace Prize. She is also one of the authors of the IPCC Special Report on Global Warming of 1.5 °C (2018). She is continuing as Coordinating Lead Author in the Sixth assessment cycle of [WGIII] of IPCC and has been a chapter author of Global Energy Assessment.

She has been awarded the 2021 Paradigm Award by the Breakthrough Institute, California, a global think tank based in California, USA. She was also in the winning team of Prince Sultan Bin Aziz award for water in 2012.

== Film ==
Roy is featured in the documentary Juice: How Electricity Explains the World.
