= Jamalpur Science and Technology University =

Public university in Jamalpur, Bangladesh

- জামালপুর বিজ্ঞান ও প্রযুক্তি বিশ্ববিদ্যালয়
- Logo of JSTU
- Other name: JSTU
- Former names: Bangamata Sheikh Fazilatunnesa Mujib Science & Technology University (2017-2025)
- Type: Public university
- Established: November 28, 2017; 8 years ago
- Chancellor: President Mirza Fakhrul Islam Alamgir
- Vice-Chancellor: Mohammad Raknuzzaman
- Location: Melandaha Upazila, Jamalpur District, Bangladesh; 24.9574°N 89.8507°E
- Campus: 30 acres
- Website: www.jstu.ac.bd

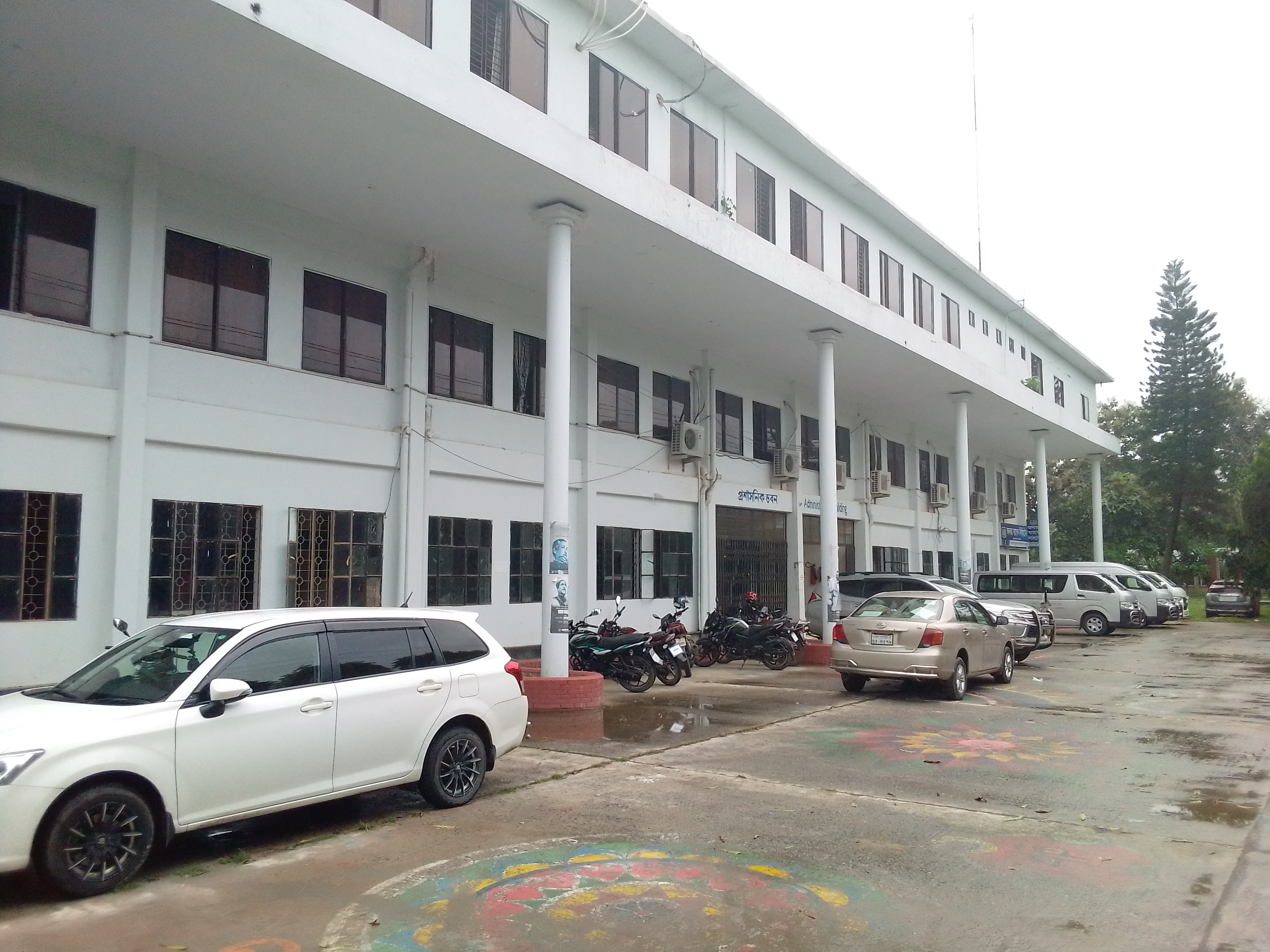
Administrative building

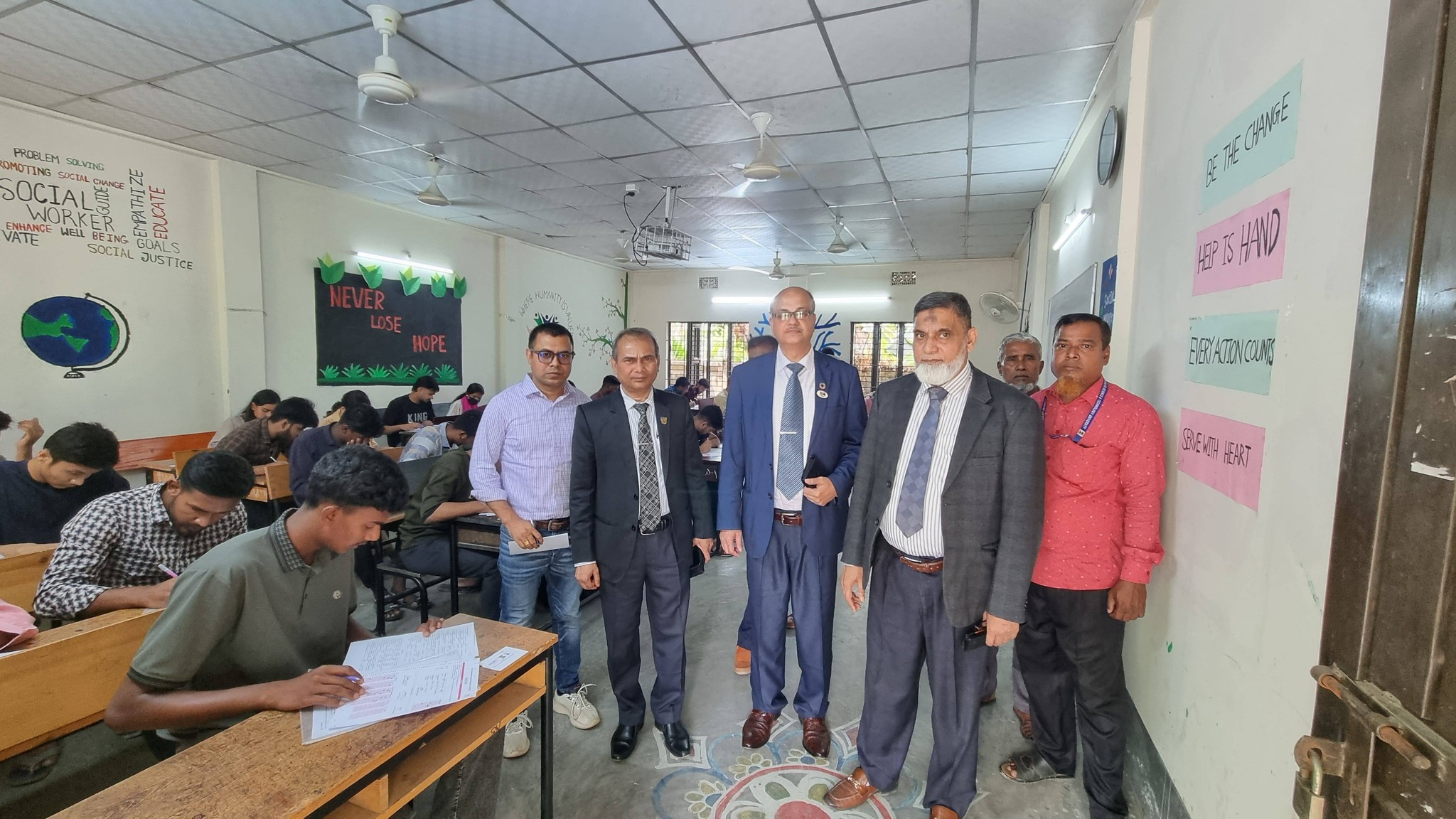
JSTU Class Room

Jamalpur Science and Technology University (Bengali: জামালপুর বিজ্ঞান ও প্রযুক্তি বিশ্ববিদ্যালয়) is a government financed public university of Bangladesh. It was established on 28 November 2017 by the Act No. 24 of 2017 as the 44th public university of Bangladesh. Later it was renamed in 2024 as Jamalpur Science and Technology University.

== History ==
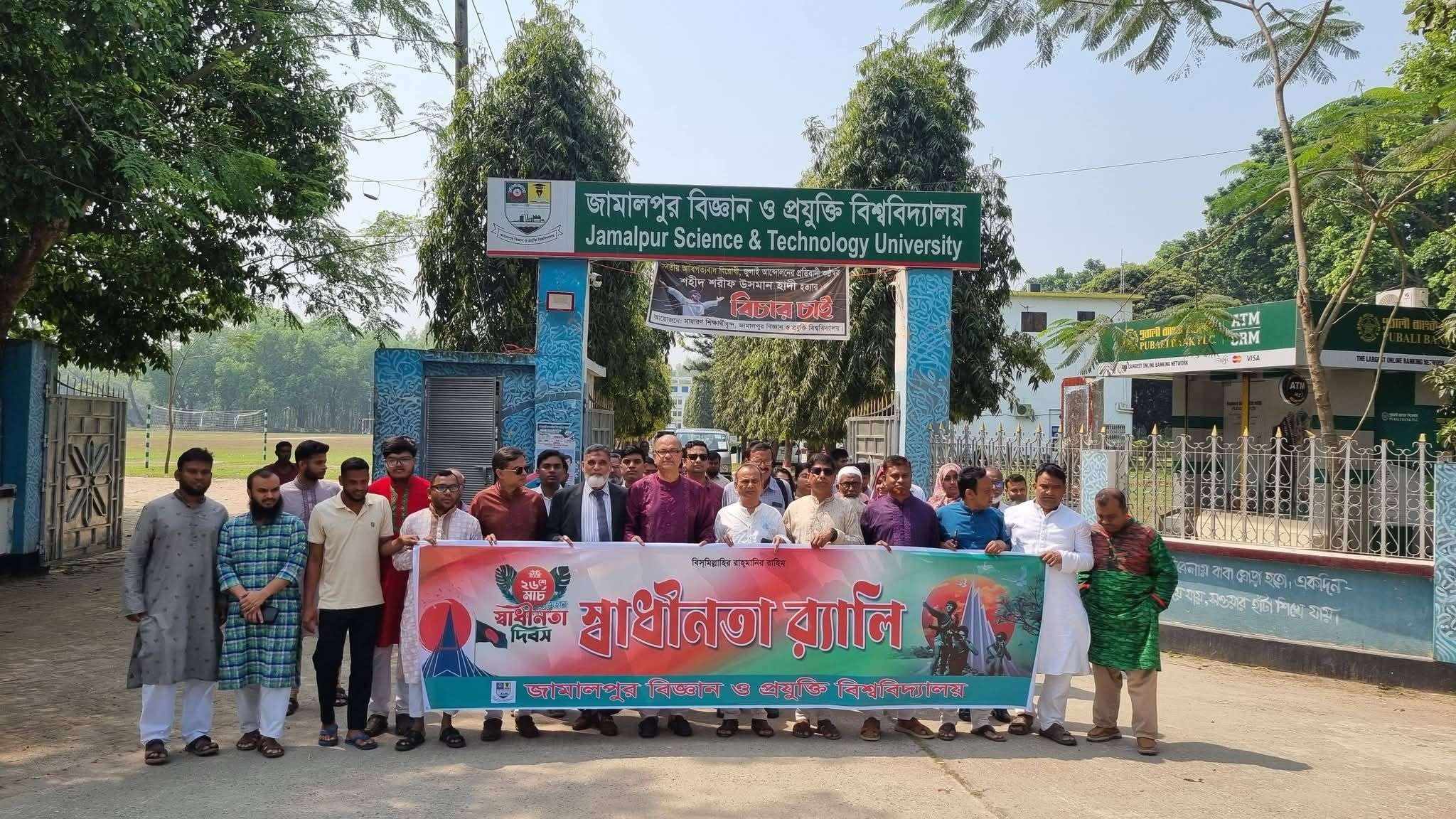
JSTU Campus Entrance Gate

In 1998, Mirza Azam, member of parliament for the Jamalpur-3 constituency, established Sheikh Fazilatunnecha Mujib Fisheries College on 33 acres in Melandaha Upazila of Jamalpur District. Classes began there in 2000. "Bangamata Sheikh Fojilatunnesa Mujib Science & Technology University Bill-2017" was passed by parliament on 20 November 2017. The university was gazetted on 28 November 2017.

On 19 November 2018, President Abdul Hamid appointed Syed Samsuddin Ahmed as the first vice chancellor of BSFMSTU. Initially, 136 students enrolled in four subjects: mathematics, management, social work, and computer engineering. The first academic session began in April 2019. Initially, the university operated from a rented building of Bangabandhu Ideal College in Jamalpur. In its second academic year, the university opened a department of electrical and electronic engineering. The university shifted to its permanent campus in January 2021.

On 1 November 2022, teachers went on strike demanding the sacking of Vice Chancellor Ahmed on grounds of corruption and nepotism, charges he denied. Ahmed's term expired on 18 November. On 12 December, Md. Kamrul Alam Khan, Professor of Physics, Jagannath University was appointed as vice chancellor. The 2nd VC, Md Kamrul Alam Khan, resigned in August, 2024.

After the fall of the Sheikh Hasina led Awami League government, on 16 January 2025, the Yunus-led interim government changed the name from ‘‘Bangamata Sheikh Fojilatunnesa Mujib Science & Technology University’’ to ‘‘Jamalpur Science and Technology University’’.

The President of Bangladesh appointed Mohammad Raknuzzaman as the 3rd vice chancellor. He joined as the vice chancellor of Jamalpur Science and Technology University on 22 October 2024.

== Academics ==
=== Faculties and departments ===
The university's 7 departments are organized into 4 faculties.

Faculty	Department
Faculty of Engineering	Computer Science and Engineering
Faculty of Engineering	Electrical and Electronic Engineering
Faculty of Science	Fisheries
Faculty of Science	Mathematics
Faculty of Science	Geology
Faculty of Social Science	Social Work
Faculty of Business	Management

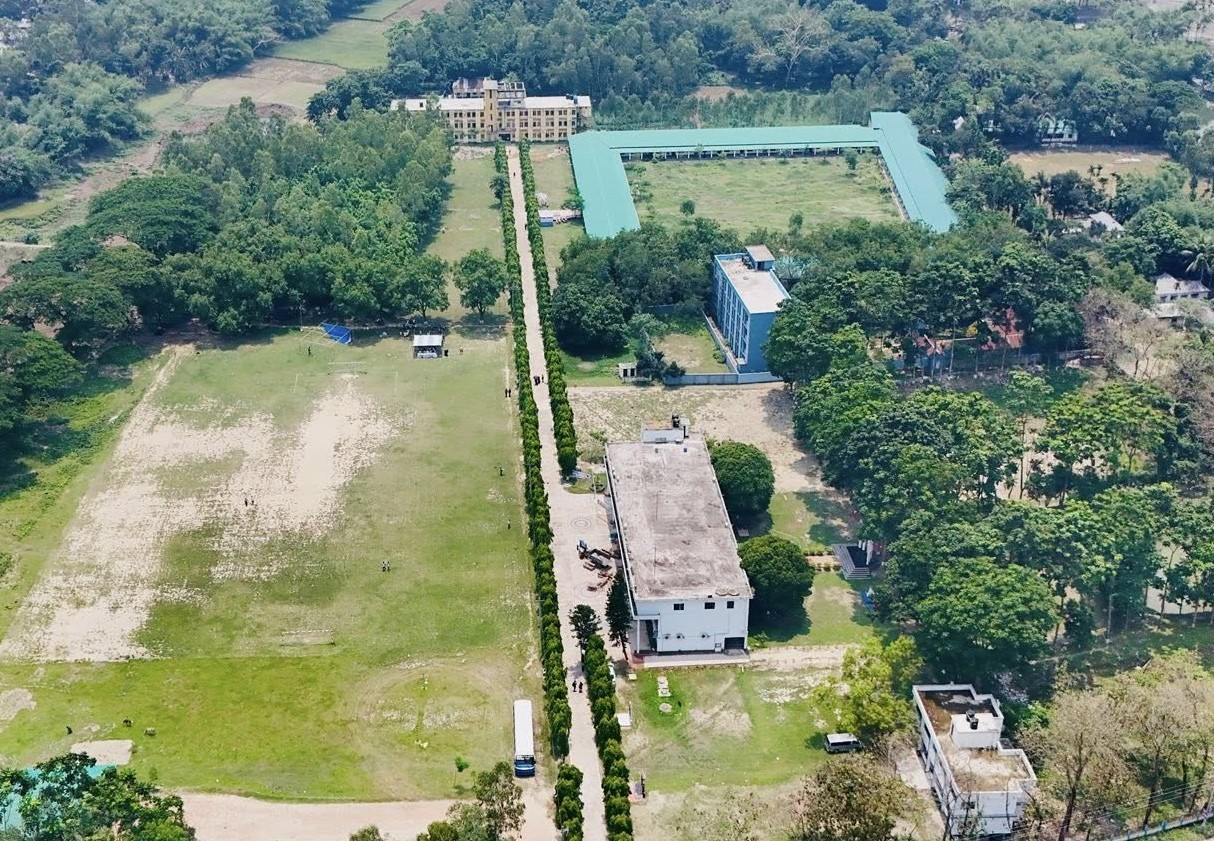
Bird's-Eye View of Campus

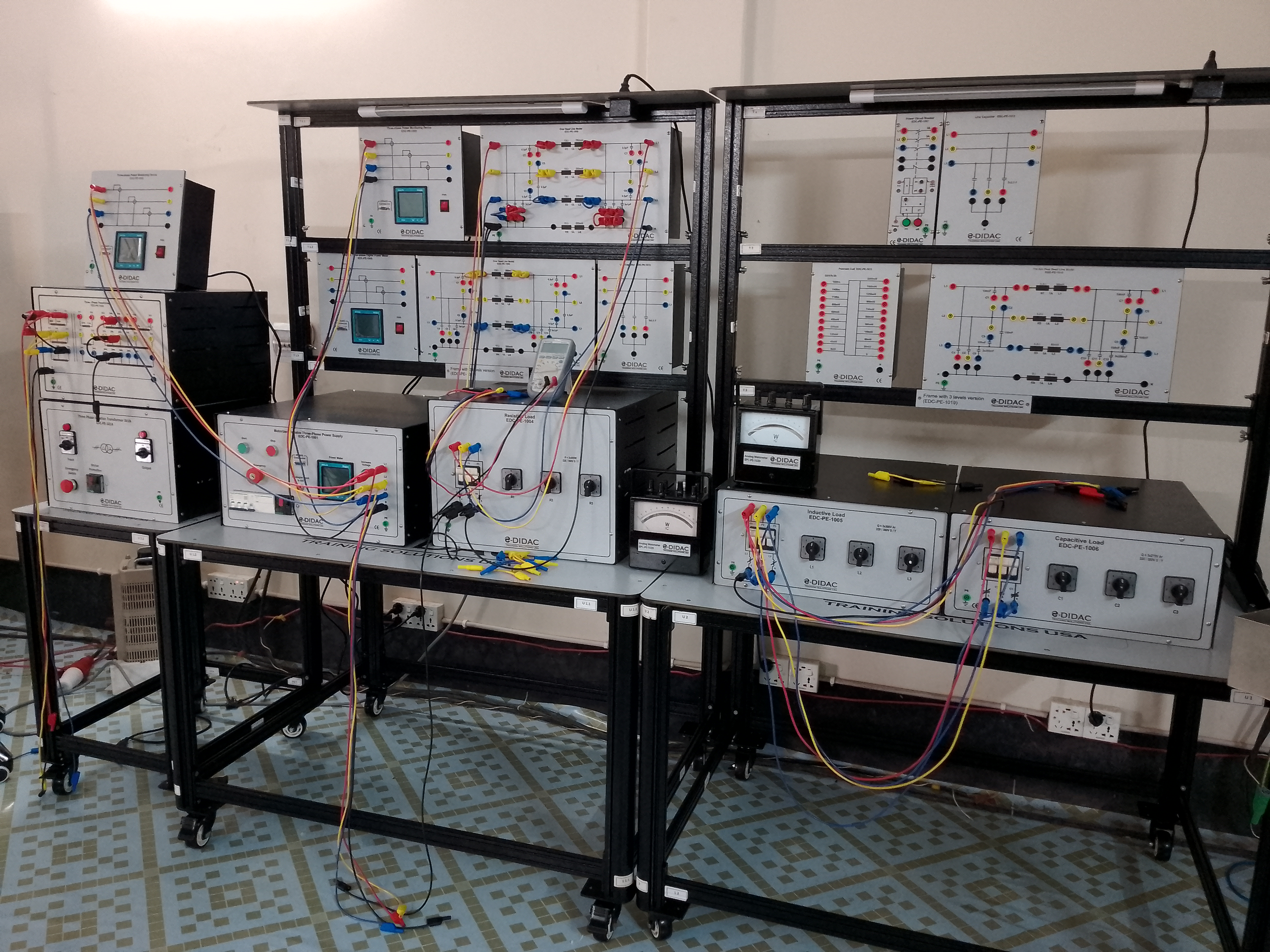
Power System Lab JSTU EEE

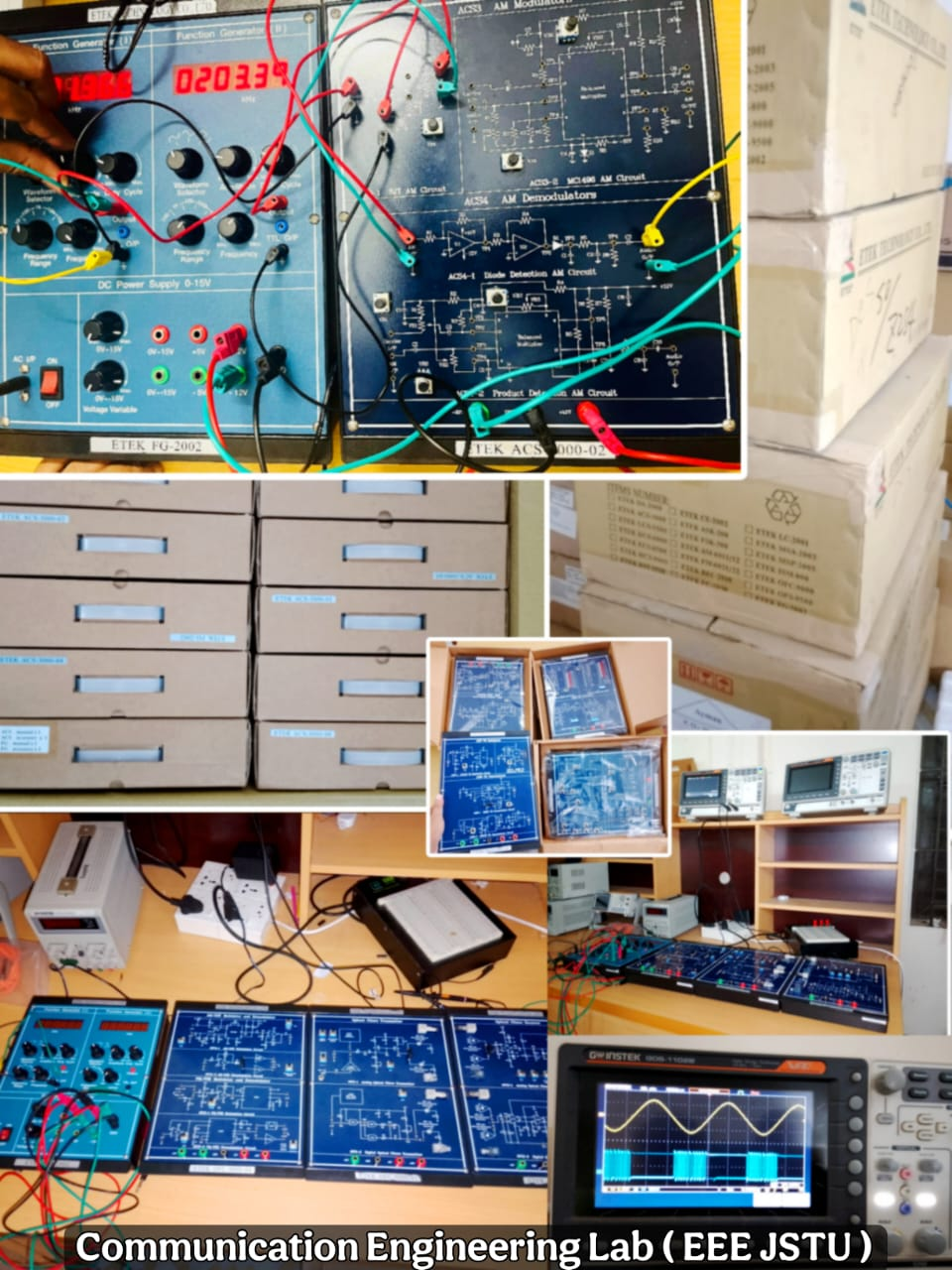
Communication Engineering Lab

== Laboratory facilities ==
Computer Science and Engineering (CSE) department has seven laboratories.

- Programming Lab
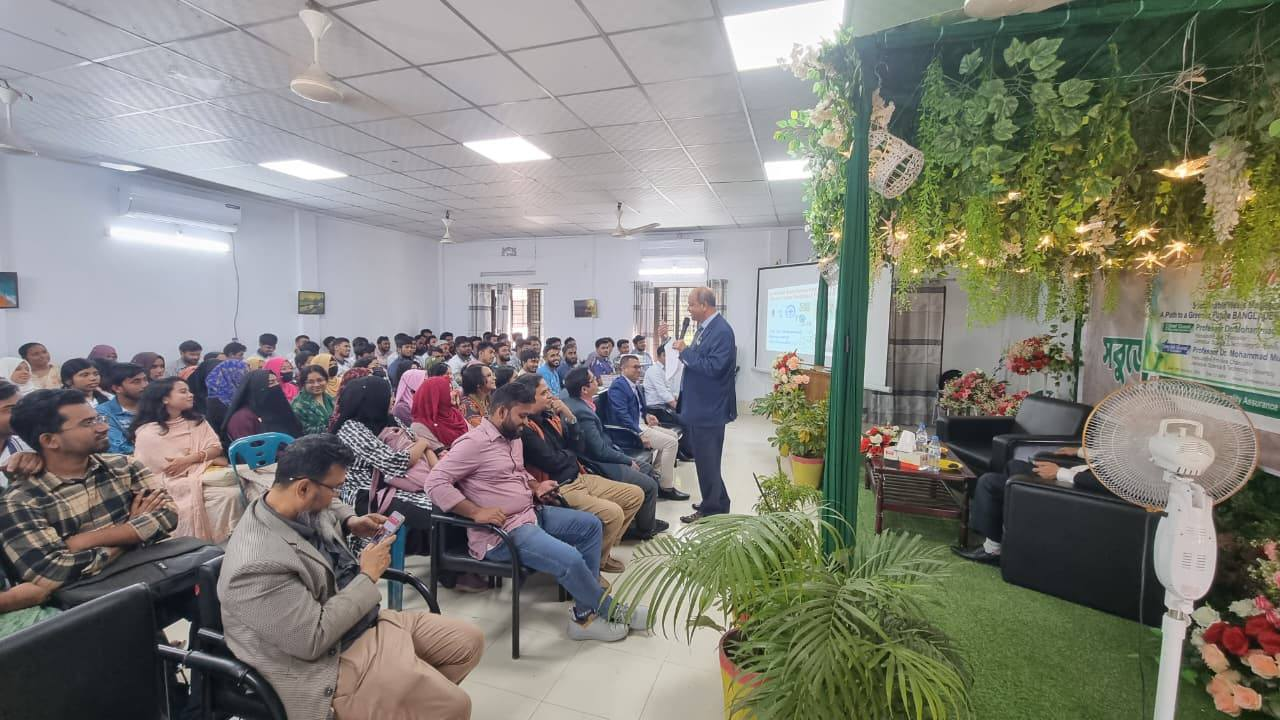
- Conference Room JSTU
  Software Engineering Lab
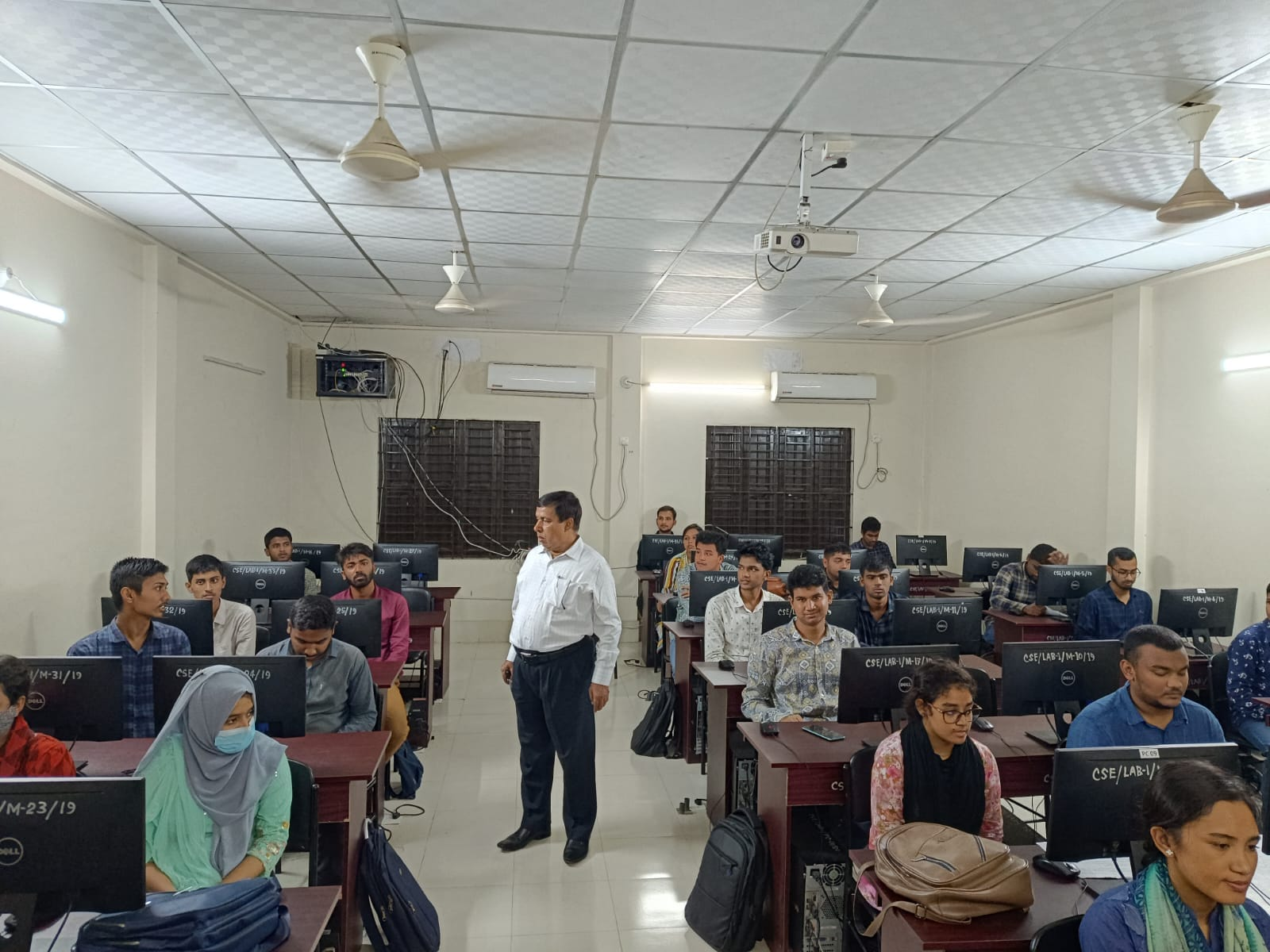
  Advanced Computer Lab
- Networking Lab
- Circuit Analysis Lab
- Analog and Digital Electronics Lab
- Communication Lab
- Database, Microprocessor & Microcontroller Lab

Electrical and Electronic Engineering (EEE) department has 9 laboratories.

- Electrical & Measurements and Instrumental Lab

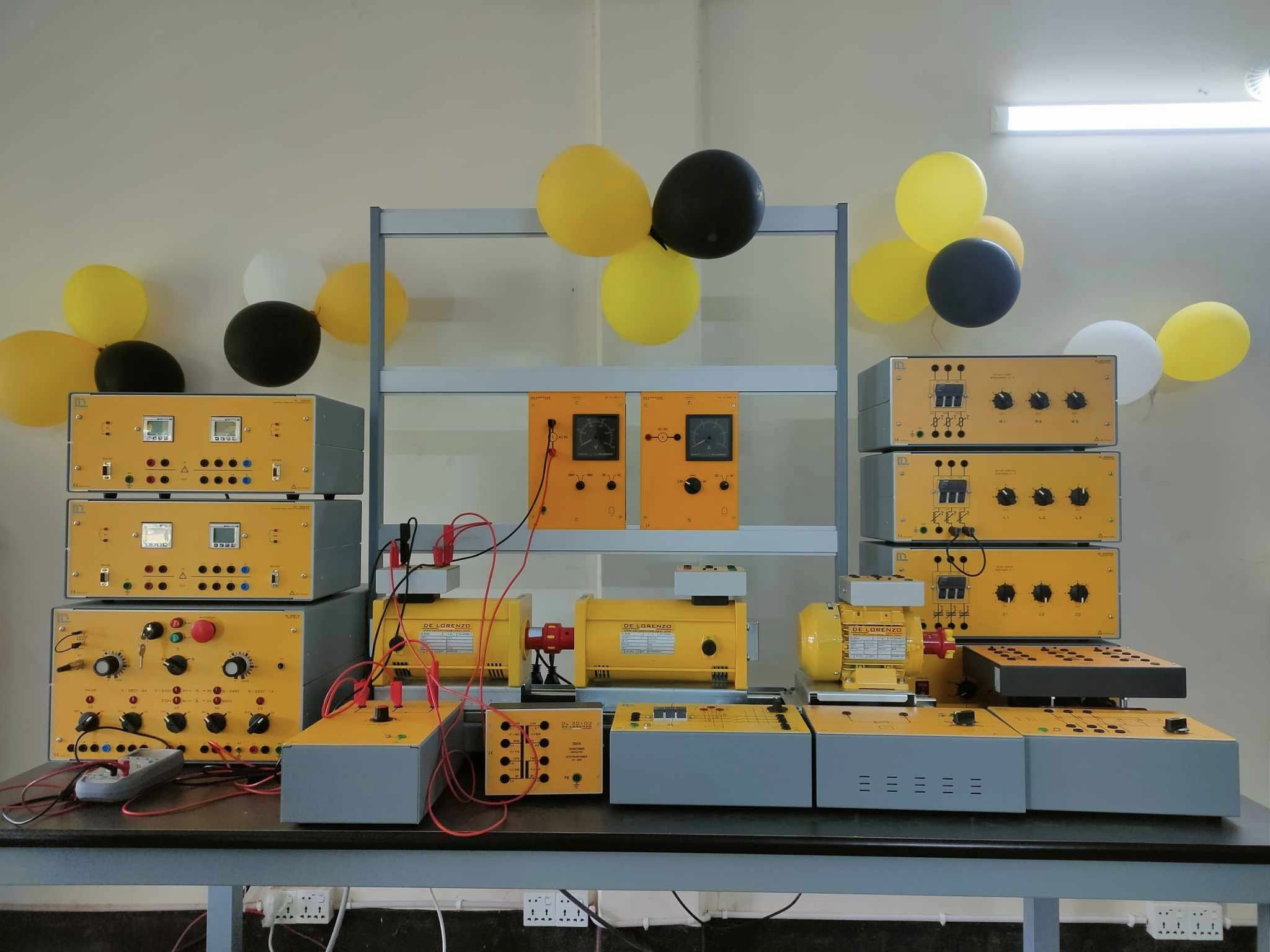
Electrical Machine Lab

- Analog and Digital Electronics Lab
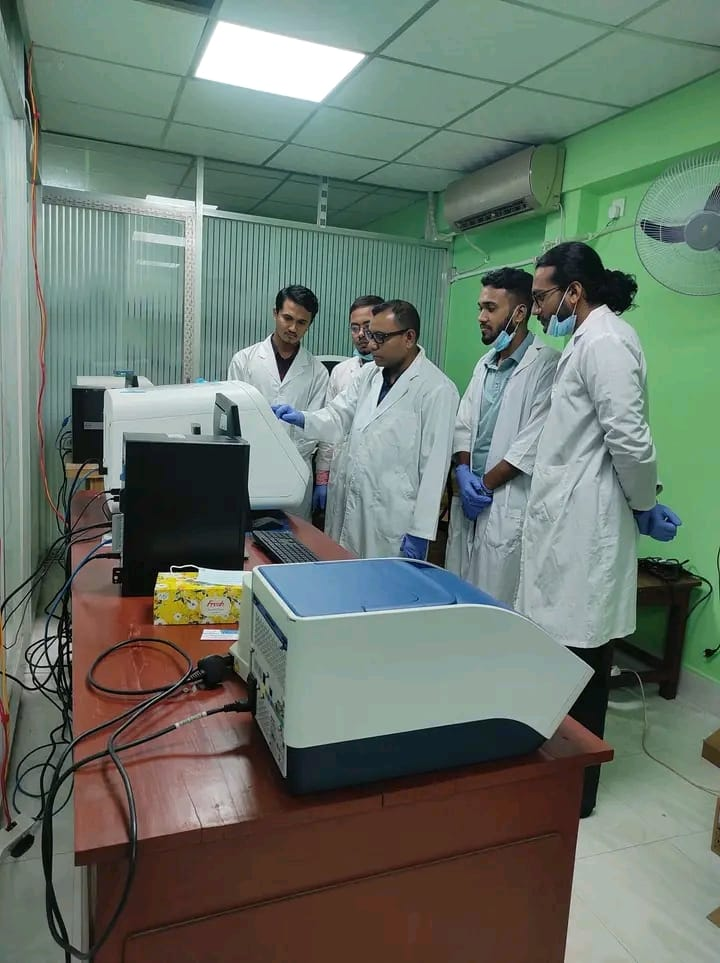
- Research Cell Visit to the Genetic Analyzer Machine Laboratory
  Programming & Computer Lab ( Latest Generation All-in-One PC)
- Electrical Machine Lab
- Analog & Digital Communication Lab
- VLSI Design & Simulation Lab
- Power System Lab
- Switchgear & Protection Lab (Simulation & Substation Based)
- Basic Power Electronics & Mechanical Engineering Lab (student developed)

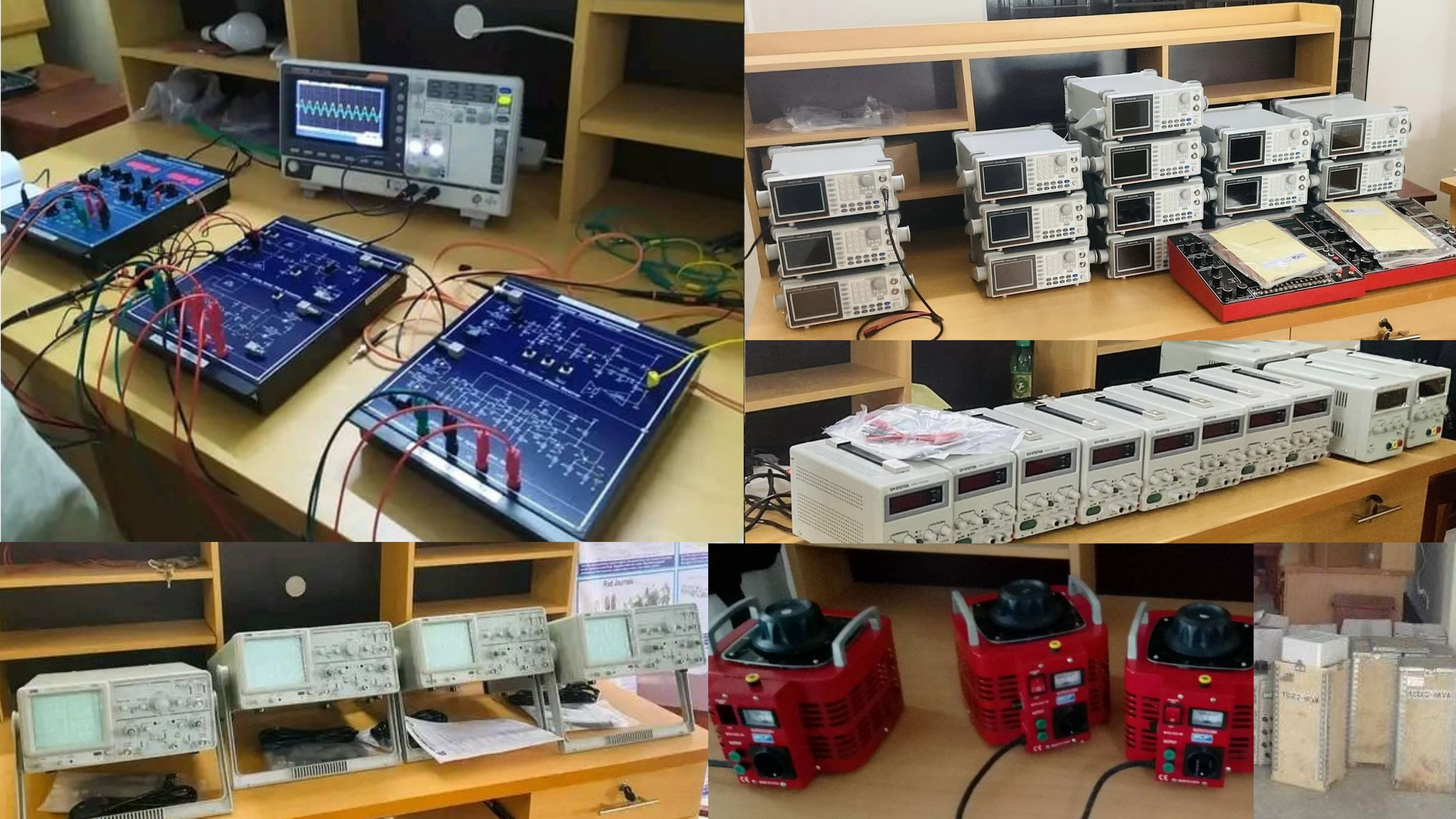
Circuit, Electronics & Communication Lab

Fisheries department has 7 laboratories including the 'Genetic Analyzer Machine Lab'.

- Fisheries Management Lab

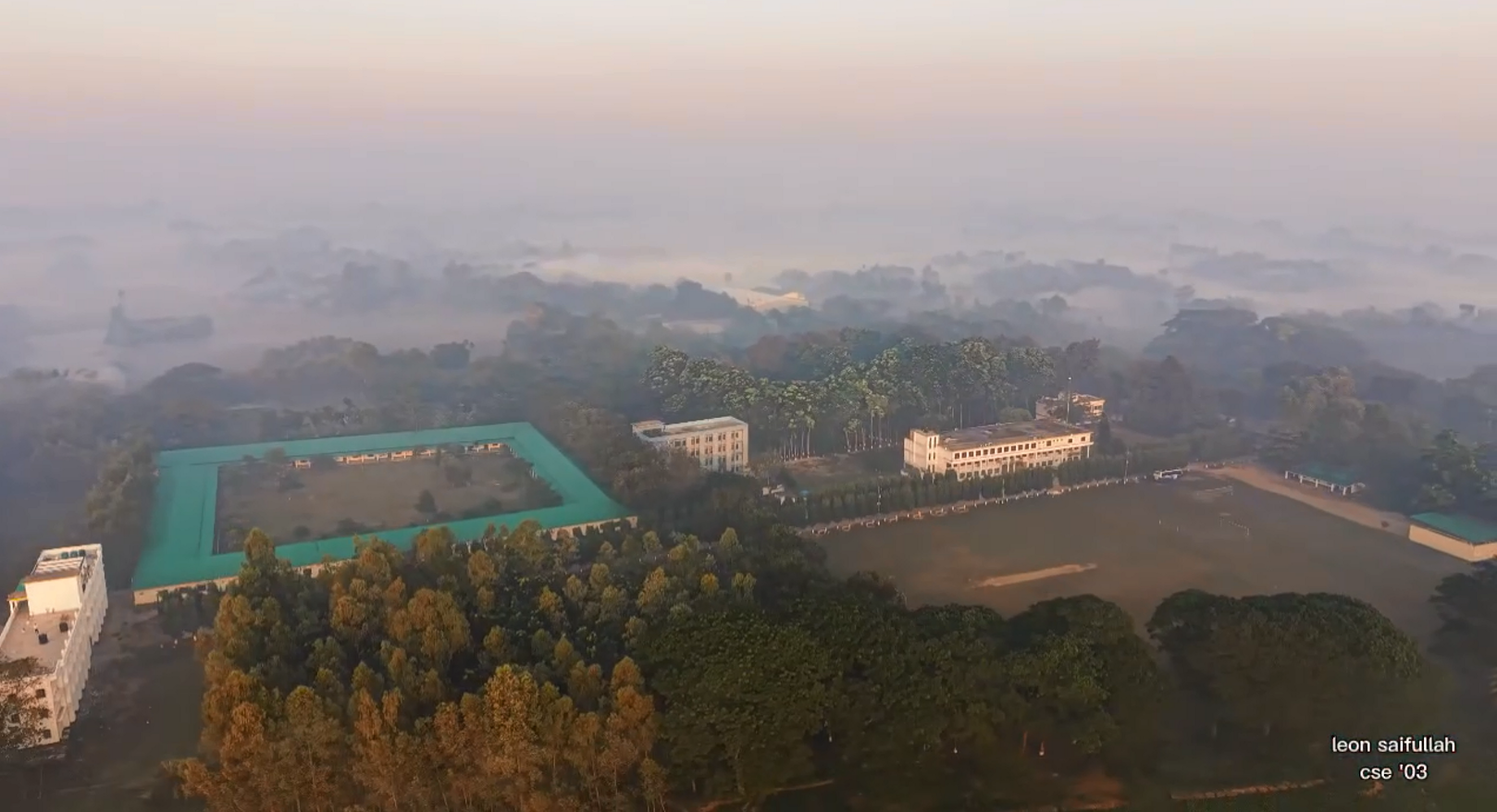
Campus Drone View

- Fisheries Lab I
- Genetic Analyzer Machine Laboratory
- Fisheries Lab II
- Fisheries Lab III
- Bio-diversity Lab
- RT PCR (DNA Testing Lab)

Other departments also use Computer Lab, English Lab, Physics Lab for basic computer learning, scientific experiments and communication development.

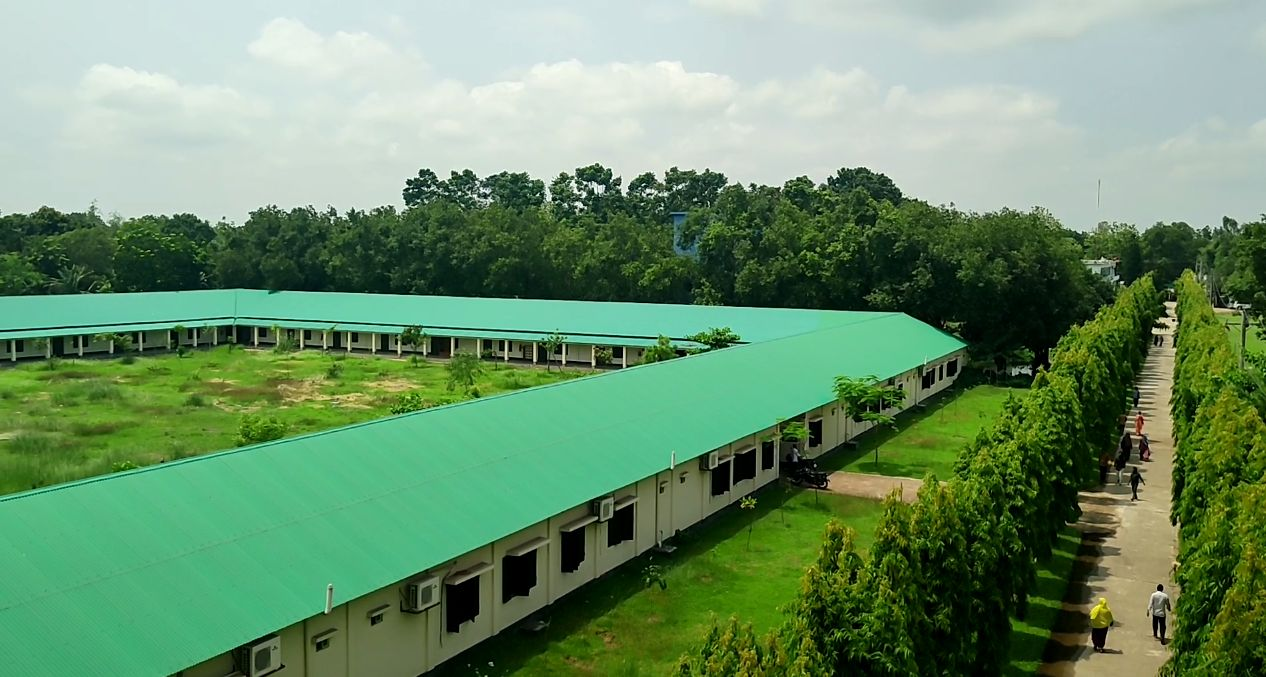
Academic Building 1

== Administration ==
=== List of vice-chancellors ===
- Syed Samsuddin Ahmed (19 November 2018 – 18 November 2022)
- Md. Kamrul Alam Khan (12 December 2022 - 12 August 2024)
- Mohammad Raknuzzaman
- Md. Amir Hossain (06 June 2026-)

== Accommodation ==
For male:

Bijoy 24 Hall (JSTU)

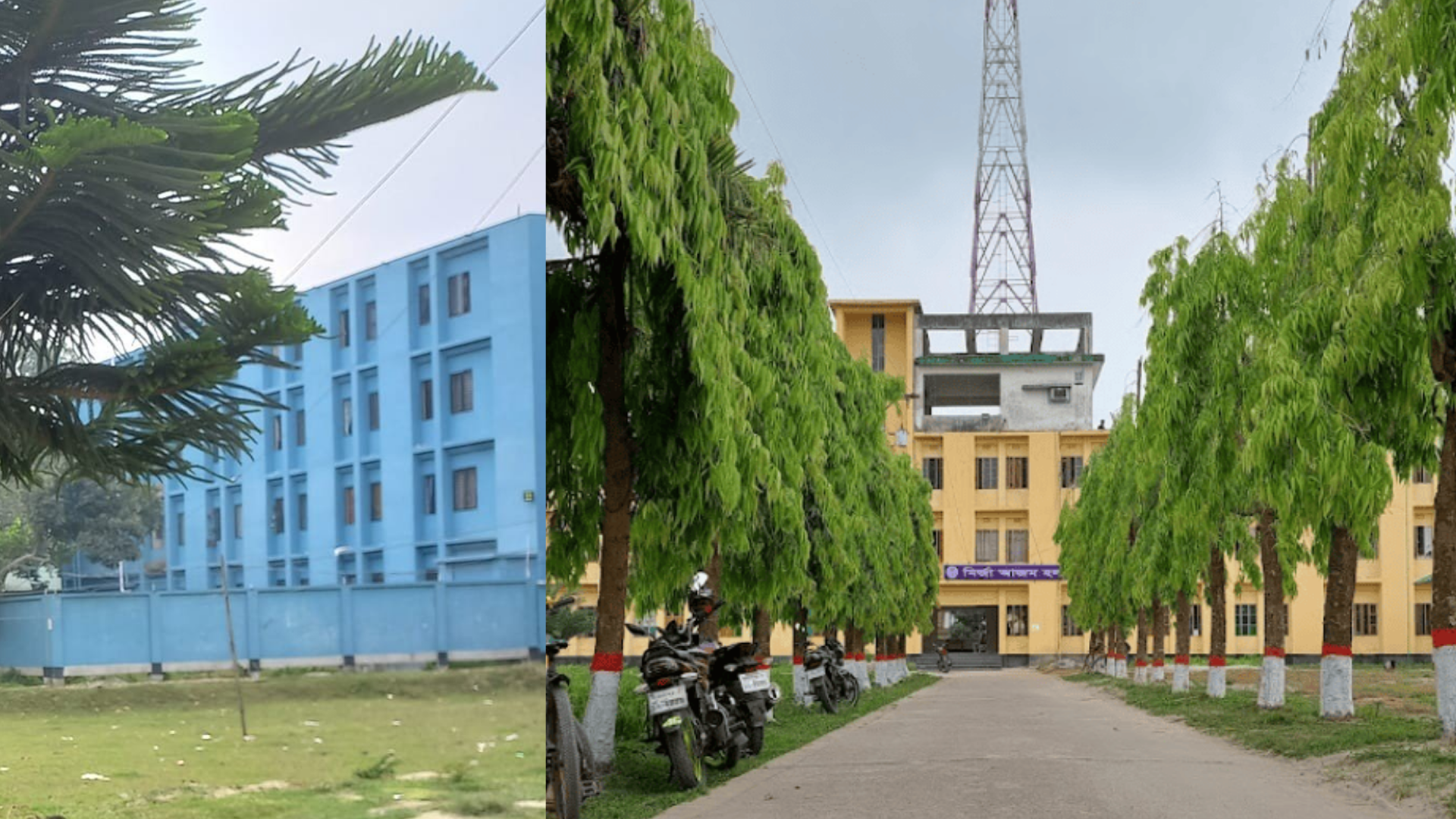
Hall Buildings

For female:

Nurunnahar Begum Hall

== Transportation ==
5 busses for students

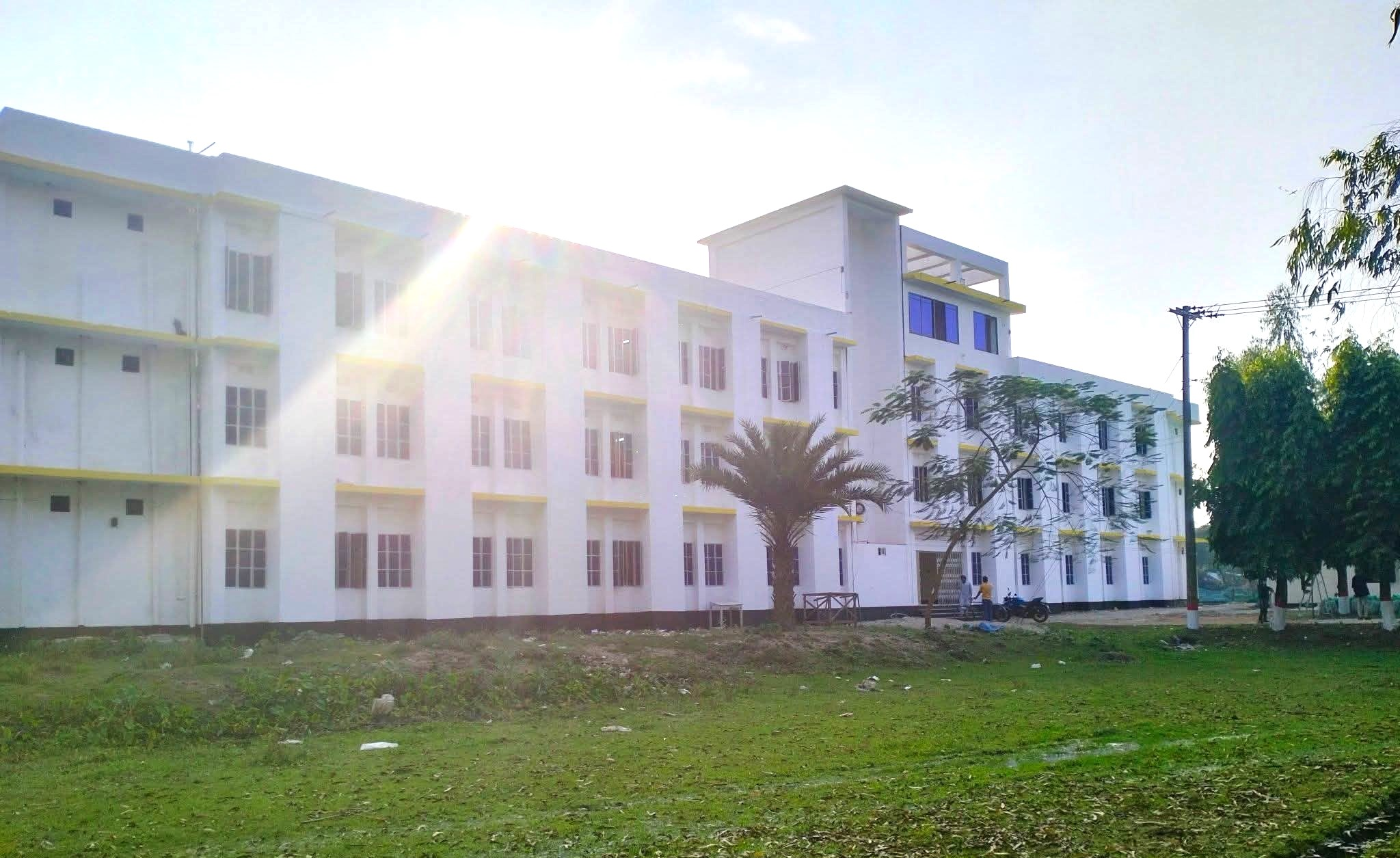
JSTU Boys Hall

3 micro-busses for teachers and staff

Separate vehicles for higher ranked administration.

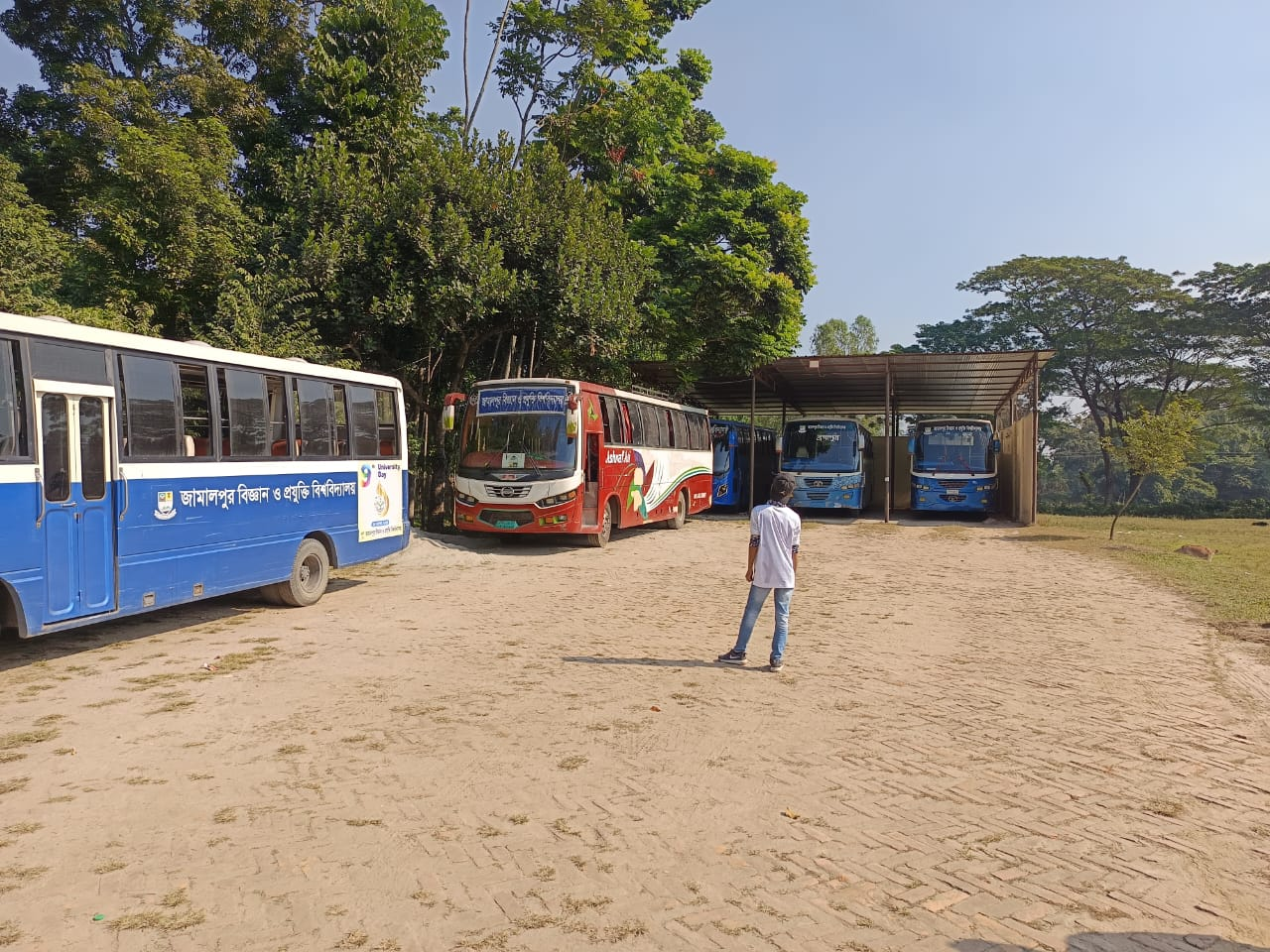
JSTU Bus Garage

== Other facilities ==
Central Library (with computer and Wi-Fi)

Central Cafeteria

Medical Centre

Bank (Janata Bank & Pubali Bank)

Central Field

CCTV Covered Campus

Each Department's Seminar Library

Internet Connection ( Ethernet ) in Each Classroom

Electrical Substation 250KVA & 200KVA Generator

== Organizations and clubs ==
JSTU Programming Club

Debating Society

Robotics Club

Computer Club

Photographic Society

Blood Donation

Other activities and system: The university has opened IQAC (Internal Quality Assurance Cell). Outcome-based education (OBE) is also ensured here with the help of professors from top-ranked public universities in Bangladesh. Seminars, cultural programs, sports, journals, magazine publication and departmental tours are some of the regular co-curricular activities here. Al departments recruiting previously experienced teachers and authority emphasizes on laboratory development i.e. practical courses.
