= Sivaji Bandyopadhyay =

Indian academic

Academic background
- Education: Jadavpur University

Academic work
- Discipline: Computer science
- Institutions: Jadavpur University

Dr. Sivaji Bandyopadhyay is an Indian academic and is currently the Chairperson and former Director of National Institute of Technology Silchar. He is a Professor of Computer Science and Engineering. He obtained his B.Tech, M.Tech and Ph.D. in Computer Science and Engineering from Jadavpur University and taught there as a Professor before joining NIT Silchar. Formerly, he has been the Dean of Engineering and Technology at Jadavpur University, the Head of the Department of Computer Science and Engineering at Jadavpur University, the Director of the Computer-Aided Design Centre at Jadavpur University and the Coordinator, TEQIP-II at Jadavpur University among other responsibilities.

He is one of the top 50 computer scientists in India and the top 6000 computer scientists around the world with an Indian rank of 40 and a global rank of 5883

During his tenure as the Chairperson and Director of National Institute of Technology Silchar, the institute achieved its first-ever global rankings across multiple international platforms. NIT Silchar was ranked in the 201–250 overall band in Asia (19th among Indian universities) by the Times Higher Education (THE) Asia University Rankings 2021, and in the 251–300 band in the Times Higher Education Emerging Economies University Rankings 2021.

In terms of sustainability, NIT Silchar secured the 275th global rank in the UI GreenMetric World University Rankings 2020, demonstrating the institute’s commitment to green practices.

Academically, NIT Silchar was ranked in the 601–800 band globally in Engineering by THE Engineering Rankings 2021, and similarly ranked in the 601–800 global band in Physical Sciences by THE Physical Sciences Rankings 2021.

Additionally, the institute was placed 750th globally in Engineering by the U.S. News & World Report Best Global Universities Engineering Rankings 2020, and in the 801–1000 overall global band (19th among Indian institutions) in THE World University Rankings 2021.

He was also instrumental in the digital transformation of NIT Silchar by initiating and implementing an Enterprise Resource Planning (ERP) solution, which significantly streamlined the institute's academic and administrative workflows. This initiative was successfully executed with the support of Dr. Naresh Babu Muppalaneni and Mr. Manash Protim Mahanta.

Professor Bandyopadhyay has supervised over 12 Ph.D. students and a total of 12 Ph.D. scholars are currently working under his supervision. He has published around 49 research articles in reputed journals and 250 research publications in reputed conferences, workshops or symposiums. He has also authored two books. He has completed 4 international research and development projects - with Germany, France, Mexico, Japan as the Principal Investigator in the area of Sentiment Analysis, Question Answering, and Textual Entailment. He was the Chief Investigator of 8 National level consortium mode projects in the areas of Machine Translation - English to Indian languages and Indian language to Indian languages, cross-lingual information access, development of treebank for Indian languages among others. Currently, he is executing three international projects funded by SPARC (MHRD) with Germany, ASEAN (DST) with Indonesia and Malaysia, DST and CNRS with France. The Center for Natural Language Processing (CNLP), a research centre has been established at NIT Silchar under his leadership.

== Publications ==
- Affective Computing and Sentiment Analysis
- Selective absorption of H_{2}S from gas streams containing H_{2}S and CO_{2} into aqueous solutions of N-methyldiethanolamine and 2-amino-2-methyl-1-propanol
