= Sarit Kumar Das =

Indian Professor

Director at Indian Institute of Technology Ropar
- In office April 2015 – March 2021
- Preceded by: M K Surappa
- Succeeded by: Dr Rajeev Ahuja

Professor at Indian Institute of Technology Madras
- In office 1995 – 2015^{(on lien)}

Personal details
- Born: West Bengal
- Education: Jadavpur University; Sambalpur University
- Profession: Professor
- Known for: Heat transfer, Liquid Metal Heat Exchangers
- Website: Official website

Sarit Kumar Das is an Institute professor of the department of mechanical engineering at IIT Madras. He also held the position of Dean (Academic Research) at Indian Institute of Technology Madras. He was the Director at IIT Ropar. His research varies from a wide range of Heat transfer applications like nanofluids, biological heat transfer microfluidics and nanoparticle mediated drug delivery in cancer cells. He is an elected fellow of National Academy of Sciences, India (NASI) and Indian National Academy of Engineering (FNAE).

== Education ==
He received his bachelor's degree and master's degrees from the Department of Mechanical Engineering at Jadavpur University, Kolkata, India in 1984 and 1987 respectively. He defended his PhD in 1994, from the Sambalpur University, Odisha, India. He joined as post-doc fellow at Helmut Schmidt University, Hamburg from 1994 to 1995.

== Work ==
Prof. Das joined as an assistant professor at the Department of Mechanical Engineering, Indian Institute of Technology Madras in 1995. He was the group leader at Heat Transfer and Thermal Power Lab. He is associated with Department of Mechanical Engineering, Indian Institute of Technology Ropar as a professor. He also serves as the editor-in-chief of the International Journal of Micro/Nanoscale Transport

== Awards and honors ==
- Alexander von Humboldt Professorship (2000)
- Prof. K. N. Seetharamu Award & Medal for Excellence in Research (2006)
- Peabody Visiting Professor, MIT, Cambridge, Massachusetts (2011)
- India Citation Award conferred by Thomson Reuters (2012)

== Selected bibliography ==
=== Books ===
- Das, Sarit K.; Choi, Stephen U.; Yu, Wenhua; Pradeep, T. (2007). Nanofluids: Science and Technology. John Wiley & Sons. ISBN 978-0-470-18068-6.
- Das, Sarit K. (2005). Process Heat Transfer. Alpha Science Int'l Ltd. ISBN 978-1-84265-046-2.

=== Patents ===
- Thermodynamic balancing of combined heat and mass exchange devices

=== Articles ===
- Garg, Kapil; Khullar, Vikrant; Das, Sarit K.; Tyagi, Himanshu (30 July 2018). "Parametric study of the energy efficiency of the HDH desalination unit integrated with nanofluid-based solar collector". Journal of Thermal Analysis and Calorimetry. 135 (2): 1465–1478. doi:10.1007/s10973-018-7547-6. S2CID 105928640.
- Jayaramu, Prasanna; Gedupudi, Sateesh; Das, Sarit K. (11 January 2019). "An Experimental Investigation on the Influence of Copper Ageing on Flow Boiling in a Copper Microchannel". Heat Transfer Engineering. 41 (4): 333–350. doi:10.1080/01457632.2018.1540459. S2CID 128089199.
- von Maltzahn, Geoffrey; Park, Ji-Ho; Agrawal, Amit; Bandaru, Nanda Kishor; Das, Sarit K.; Sailor, Michael J.; Bhatia, Sangeeta N. (1 May 2009). "Computationally Guided Photothermal Tumor Therapy Using Long-Circulating Gold Nanorod Antennas". Cancer Research. 69 (9): 3892–3900. doi:10.1158/0008-5472.CAN-08-4242. PMC 2712876. PMID 19366797.
- Kumar, D. Hemanth; Patel, Hrishikesh E.; Kumar, V. R. Rajeev; Sundararajan, T.; Pradeep, T.; Das, Sarit K. (27 September 2004). "Model for Heat Conduction in Nanofluids". Physical Review Letters. 93 (14) 144301. Bibcode:2004PhRvL..93n4301K. doi:10.1103/PhysRevLett.93.144301. PMID 15524799.
- Das, Sarit Kumar; Putra, Nandy; Thiesen, Peter; Roetzel, Wilfried (1 August 2003). "Temperature Dependence of Thermal Conductivity Enhancement for Nanofluids". Journal of Heat Transfer. 125 (4): 567–574. doi:10.1115/1.1571080.
