= Amitabha Bhattacharyya =

Indian production engineer (1931–1992)

- Born: 12 November 1931; Dhaka, Bengal Presidency, British India
- Died: 15 June 1992 (aged 60); Brussels, Belgium
- Education: University of Calcutta; IIEST Shibpur; Jadavpur University; University of Illinois
- Awards: FIE Award; 1966 Sir R. N. Mukherjee Gold Medal; 1971 IE K. F. Antia Memorial Prize; Chandra Prakash Memorial Prize; Sir Walter Pluckey Memorial Award; 1971 Shanti Swarup Bhatnagar Prize
- Scientific career
- Fields: Production engineering
- Workplaces: Jadavpur University; IIT Kanpur
- Doctoral advisor: Gopal Chandra Sen

Amitabha Bhattacharyya (12 November 1931 – 15 June 1992) was an Indian production engineer and the director of the Indian Institute of Technology, Kanpur. He was credited with the establishment of the department of production engineering at Jadavpur University. The Council of Scientific and Industrial Research, the apex agency of the Government of India for scientific research, awarded him the Shanti Swarup Bhatnagar Prize for Science and Technology, one of the highest Indian science awards for his contributions to Engineering Sciences in 1971.

== Biography ==
Born in Dhaka in British India (presently in Bangladesh) on 12 November 1931, Bhattacharyya graduated in mechanical engineering in 1951 and after completing master's degree in mechanical engineering at Bengal Engineering College, Shibpur of Calcutta University (now IIEST Shibpur) in 1956, he obtained the degree of MS from the University of Illinois. Returning to India, he secured a PhD from Jadavpur University in 1962, studying under the guidance of Gopal Chandra Sen. Subsequently, he served as a professor of mechanical engineering at Jadavpur University where he established the department of production engineering. He was known to have done pioneering work on cutting tool technology and was reported to have developed several machine tools including tangential-split modified point drill, retraced type Kolosov high production tools, and core drill with clamped inserts. His contributions are also reported in the development of tantalum nitrate-zirconium diboride, a ceramic material used for making cutting tools. He was an elected fellow of the Indian National Science Academy, Indian National Academy of Engineering, National Academy of Sciences, India, and Institution of Engineers (India) as well as a recipient of FIE Award, Sir R. N. Mukherjee Gold Medal, K. F. Antia Memorial Prize of Institution of Engineers, India, Chandra Prakash Memorial Prize and Sir Walter Pluckey Memorial Award. He was married to Jayati and the couple had one son, Nilanjan. He died on 25 June 1992 at Brussels, while on a visit to Belgium, at the age of 60. The Council of Scientific and Industrial Research awarded him the Shanti Swarup Bhatnagar Prize, one of the highest Indian science awards in 1971.

== See also ==
- Presidency College, Kolkata
- Manufacturing engineering
