= Pulak Sengupta =

Indian petrologist

- Born: 5 December 1963 (age 62); West Bengal, India
- Education: Jadavpur University
- Known for: Studies on grain-scale reaction mechanism
- Awards: 2006 S. S. Bhatnagar Prize
- Scientific career
- Fields: Metamorphic petrology
- Workplaces: Jadavpur University

Pulak Sengupta (born 1963) is an Indian petrologist and a professor and former head of the Department of Geological Sciences of Jadavpur University. He is known for his studies on grain-scale reaction mechanism and ultra-high temperature regional scale metamorphism and his studies have been documented in several peer-reviewed articles; (Note: Please see Selected bibliography section) ResearchGate and Google Scholar, online repositories of scientific articles, have listed 31 and 60 of them respectively. Besides, he has contributed chapters to many books published by others. He has also mentored doctoral scholars in their studies. (Note: Long link - please select award year to see details)

Sengupta, born on 5 December 1963 in the Indian state of West Bengal did his master's studies at Jadavpur University and subsequently secured a PhD from the same institution before joining his alma mater as a member of faculty. He is an elected fellow of Indian Academy of Sciences, and the Indian National Science Academy. The Council of Scientific and Industrial Research, the apex agency of the Government of India for scientific research, awarded him the Shanti Swarup Bhatnagar Prize for Science and Technology, one of the highest Indian science awards for his contributions to Earth, Atmosphere, Ocean and Planetary Sciences in 2006. Apart from academics his interests include photography and travelling.

== Selected bibliography ==
=== Chapters in books ===
- Masaru Yoshida; Brian F. Windley; Somnath Dasgupta, Pulak Sengupta (coauthor) (2003). Proterozoic East Gondwana: Supercontinent Assembly and Breakup. Geological Society of London. pp. 142–. ISBN 978-1-86239-125-3.
- Alok Krishna Gupta, Pulak Sengupta (coauthor) (6 October 2011). Physics and Chemistry of the Earth's Interior: Crust, Mantle and Core. Springer Science & Business Media. pp. 28–. ISBN 978-1-4419-0346-4.
- Rajesh Srivastava, Pulak Sengupta (coauthor) (22 March 2011). Dyke Swarms: Keys for Geodynamic Interpretation. Springer Science & Business Media. pp. 22–. ISBN 978-3-642-12496-9.
- Soumyajit Mukherjee; Kieran F. Mulchrone, Pulak Sengupta (coauthor) (21 December 2015). Ductile Shear Zones: From Micro- to Macro-scales. John Wiley & Sons. pp. 141–. ISBN 978-1-118-84496-0.

=== Articles ===
- Bhui, Uttam K.; Sengupta, Pulak; Sengupta, Pranesh (2007). "Phase relations in mafic dykes and their host rocks from Kondapalle, Andhra Pradesh, India: Implications for the time-depth trajectory of the Palaeoproterozoic (late Archaean?) granulites from southern Eastern Ghats Belt". Precambrian Research. 156 (3–4): 153–174. Bibcode:2007PreR..156..153B. doi:10.1016/j.precamres.2007.03.005.
- Raith, Michael M.; Sengupta, Pulak; Kooijman, Ellen; Upadhyay, Dewashish; Srikantappa, C. (2010). "Corundum-leucosome-bearing aluminous gneiss from Ayyarmalai, Southern Granulite Terrain, India: A textbook example of vapor phase-absent muscovite-melting in silica-undersaturated aluminous rocks". American Mineralogist. 95 (7): 897–907. Bibcode:2010AmMin..95..897R. doi:10.2138/am.2010.3399. S2CID 54610668.
- Somnath Dasgupta, Jürgen Ehl, Michael M. Raith, Pulak Sengupta, Pranesh Sengupta (1997). "Mid-crustal contact metamorphism around the Chimakurthy mafic-ultramafic complex, Eastern Ghats Belt, India". Contributions to Mineralogy and Petrology. 129 (2): 182–197. Bibcode:1997CoMP..129..182D. doi:10.1007/s004100050331. S2CID 131612494.
- Maitrayee Chakraborty, Nandini Sengupta, Sayan Biswas, Pulak Sengupta (2014). "Phosphate minerals as a recorder of P-T-fluid regimes of metamorphic belts: example from the Palaeoproterozoic Singhbhum Shear Zone of the East Indian shield". International Geology Review. 57 (11–12): 1619–1632. doi:10.1080/00206814.2014.982216. S2CID 128921867.
- Maitrayee Chakraborty, Sayan Biswas, Nandini Sengupta, Pulak Sengupta (2014). "First Report of Florencite from the Singhbhum Shear Zone of the East Indian Craton". International Journal of Mineralogy. 2014: 1–8. doi:10.1155/2014/978793.

== See also ==
- Deformation mechanism
