= Harish C. Mehta =

Harish Chandra Mehta is a university lecturer and historian of the foreign relations of the United States. He is also the Editor in Chief of the Rising Asia Journal.

== Journalistic career ==
Mehta has written for the press including for Outlook from at least 1996 through 2000.

== Books ==
Mehta has authored, co-authored, or edited a number of books.

In 1997, he published Cambodia Silenced: The Press under Six Regimes. Writing in the Southeast Asian Journal of Social Science, Steven J. Appold said that the book "does a credible job of informing readders of the who, what, when, and where of Cambodian journalism on the basis of scanty data." However, he added that "the book gives less satisfying asnwers to the questions of how and why of Cambodian journalism."

Mehta published a biography of Norodom Ranariddh in 2001 titled Warrior prince: Norodom Ranariddh, son of King Sihanouk of Cambodia. Bertil Lintner, writing in the Far Eastern Economic Review, called it "the most comprehensive account of life inside the Cambodian royal family that has been written so far." The book "cause[d] a serious rift within the family it describes." After giving interviews to Mehta, the book's subject "backed out because he did not want to worsen relations with his father, King Norodom Sihanouk of Cambodia. ...[issuing] a statement saying that the book is 'inaccurate' and 'fails to reflect the contents of the interviews and words expressed.'"

Hun Sen: Strongman of Cambodia (co-author Julie Mehta) is based on several hours of interviews with Prime Minister Hun Sen, whom the authors have known personally for twenty-one years; an updated edition was published in 2013. It has been criticised by reviewers as being hagiographic and plagued by extreme partiality towards Hun Sen.

His book, People’s Diplomacy of Vietnam: Soft Power in the Resistance War, 1965–1972 was published in 2020.

In 2024, he published Between homelands in Michael Ondaatje's fiction co-edited with Julie Mehta.

== Awards ==
As a historian, Mehta has won the Samuel Flagg Bemis Award in 2008 and 2007 given by the Society for Historians of American Foreign Relations.
