= Himani Bannerji =

Bengali-Canadian author and sociologist

- Born: 1942 (age 83–84); British India
- Education: Visva-Bharati University, B.A. Jadavpur University, M.A. University of Toronto, M.A. University of Toronto, Ph.D.

Himani Bannerji (born 1942) is a Bengali-Canadian author and sociologist.

== Early life and education ==
Bannerji was born in what is now Bangladesh, then a part of British India. She studied in Dhaka then in Kolkata. She received her B.A. and M.A. in English from Visva-Bharati University and Jadavpur University respectively, becoming a lecturer at the latter from 1965 to 1969. She then received her M.A. from the University of Toronto and taught at Victoria College and Atkinson College. She started work on a PhD in sociology in 1980 and it was completed in 1988 with the title: The Politics of Representation: A Study of Class and Class Struggle in the Political Theatre of West Bengal.

== Career ==
She is a Senior Scholar in the Department of Sociology and has taught in the Graduate Program in Social and Political Thought and the Graduate Program in Women's Studies at York University in Canada.

Bannerji works in the areas of Marxist, feminist, and anti-racist theory. She is especially focused on reading colonial discourse through Karl Marx's concept of ideology and putting together a reflexive analysis of gender, race and class. Bannerji also lectures about the gaze and the othering and silencing of women who are marginalized.

She was awarded the 2005 Rabindra Memorial Prize for her book Inventing Subjects: Studies in Hegemony, Patriarchy and Colonialism.

She has also written poetry and children's fiction. Two of her articles have been published in Rungh magazine.

== Bibliography ==
=== Non-fiction ===
- The ideological condition: selected essays on history, race and gender. Leiden: Brill. 2020. ISBN 978-90-04-44161-3.
- Demography and democracy: essays on nationalism, gender and ideology. Toronto: Canadian Scholars' Press. 2011. ISBN 978-1-55130-389-5.
- Inventing subjects: studies in hegemony, patriarchy, and colonialism. New Delhi: Tulika. 2001. ISBN 978-81-85229-47-8.
- The dark side of the nation: essays on multiculturalism, nationalism and gender. Toronto: Canadian Scholars' Press. 2009. ISBN 978-1-55130-172-3.
- The writing on the wall: essays on culture and politics. Toronto: TSAR. 1993. ISBN 978-0-920661-30-7.
- Thinking through: essays on feminism, Marxism and anti-racism. Toronto: Women's Press. 1995. ISBN 978-0-88961-208-2.
- The mirror of class: essays on Bengali theatre. Calcutta: Papyrus. 1998.

=== Fiction ===
- Coloured pictures. Toronto: Sister Vision Press. 1991. ISBN 978-0-920813-86-7.
- "Her mother's ashes" in Aziz, Nurjehan, ed. (1994). Her mother's ashes and other stories by South Asian women in Canada and the United States. Toronto: TSAR. ISBN 978-0-920661-40-6.

=== Poetry ===
- Doing time: poems. Toronto: Sister Vision. 1986. ISBN 978-0920813010.
- A separate sky. Toronto: Domestic Bliss. 1982. Includes her English translation of Bengali poems by Subhas Mukhapadhyay, Manbendra Bandyopadhyay, and Shamshur Rahman.

=== As co-author ===
- Bannerji, Himani; Mojab, Shahrzad; Whitehead, Judith, eds. (2001). Of Property and Propriety: The Role of Gender and Class in Imperialism and Nationalism. University of Toronto Press. ISBN 978-1-4426-7800-2.

=== As editor ===
- Unsettling relations: the university as a site of feminist struggles. Boston: South End Press. 1992. ISBN 978-0-89608-452-0.
- Returning the gaze: essays on racism, feminism, and politics. Toronto: Sister Vision. 1993. ISBN 978-0-920813-55-3.
