= Santanu Bose =

Indian director and drama teacher

- Santanu Bose
- Born: 27 November 1967 (age 58); Kolkata
- Education: Drama Studio London
- Occupations: Actor, director

Santanu Bose is an Indian-theatre director and drama teacher. He has worked extensively on multicultural issues in collaborative process. He is the dean of the academic affairs and associate professor, World Drama of National School of Drama, (NSD) New Delhi.

== Early life and education ==
Bose studied comparative literature at Jadavpur University, Kolkata in 1992. He started his theatre career with an apprenticeship under Tripti Mitra. He further studied design and direction at National School of Drama, New Delhi in 1992–1995. In 1996, he was awarded Charles Wallace Fellowship and went on to study acting at Drama Studio London. There he acted in the play Our Man with an international cast under the direction of Peter Layton.

== Career ==
He came back to India and started working as a lecturer in art direction at Satyajit Ray Film and Television Institute, Kolkata and later he joined the National School of Drama as assistant professor of World drama. He has also taught as visiting faculty at Rabindra Bharati University, University of Hyderabad, Jamia Milia University, and Indira Gandhi Nation Open University.

Bose received critical acclaim as an actor in the short film Sunder Jeebon, directed by Sandeep Chaterjee. He has done research and sections of dialogue for the Film "Name of a River" by Anup Singh and done Art Direction for the film Reaching Silence by Jahar Kanungo.

He has also created over 60 theatre pieces in India, England, Australia, Germany, France and Belgium. In 2000, he founded Monirath Theatre Group, in Calcutta. The German-Indian theatre collaborations with the Goethe Institute Calcutta have been an important part in the work done by his group. Some of the notable works are:

- Sophocles's Antigone
- Macbeth Question
- Goethe's Faust
- Widowed Pimp & House of Horrors
- Bertolt Brecht and Elizabeth Hauptmann's Threepenny Opera
- Mahasweta Devi's Hazaar Chaurasi Ki Maa
- Raddi Bazaar
- Kala Khatta Chuski Kholi Khokha Khopcha
- Girish Karnad's Raktkalyan
- Sottor-Uttor
- Roddur Wala Goli

== See also ==
- Theatre of India
- Bengali theatre
