= Bharat Aggarwal =

Indian-American biochemist

Bharat B. Aggarwal
- Education: University of Delhi; Banares Hindu University; University of California, Berkeley
- Scientific career
- Fields: Biochemistry

Bharat B. Aggarwal is an Indian-American biochemist. His research has been in the areas of cytokines, the role of inflammation in cancer, and the anti-cancer effects of spices and herbs, particularly curcumin (a chemical constituent of the spice turmeric). He was a professor in the Department of Clinical Immunology, Bioimmunotherapy, and Experimental Therapeutics at University of Texas MD Anderson Cancer Center in Houston, Texas.

In 2012, MD Anderson launched a review of Aggarwal's research after the federal government notified them of allegations of fraud by academic whistleblowers in as many as 65 of Aggarwal's published papers, with the allegations involving images that had been reused and manipulated to represent different results. He retired at the end of 2015; his departure was not made public until February 2016.

As of 2023, 30 papers published by Aggarwal have been retracted, ten others have received an expression of concern, and 17 others have been corrected.

== Career ==
Aggarwal holds a Bachelor of Science degree from the University of Delhi (1970), a Master of Science degree from Banaras Hindu University (1972) and a Doctor of Philosophy degree from the University of California, Berkeley (1977), all in biochemistry. He completed a postdoctoral fellowship at the University of California, San Francisco and was employed as a scientist at Genentech from 1980 to 1989, where his team characterized the cytokines TNF-alpha and TNF-beta. Aggarwal was Chief of the Cytokine Research Section, Department of Clinical Immunology, Bioimmunotherapy, Experimental Therapeutics at MD Anderson Cancer Center of the University of Texas in Houston from 1989 to 2015.

Aggarwal's research has focused on potential anti-cancer properties of herbs and spices, particularly curcumin, which is found in the spice turmeric. In 2004 Aggarwal co-founded the company Curry Pharmaceuticals, based in Research Triangle Park, N.C., which was seeking to develop drugs based on synthetic analogs of curcumin. SignPath Pharma, a company seeking to develop liposomal formulations of curcumin, in 2013 licensed three patents from Aggarwal related to that approach.

== Scientific misconduct ==
In 2012, MD Anderson initiated a review of Aggarwal's research after the U.S. Department of Health and Human Services' Office of Research Integrity notified the institution that academic whistleblowers had found evidence of image manipulation in 65 published papers by Aggarwal.

In 2013, Aggarwal's lawyer proposed legal action against the blog Retraction Watch after they reported several of Aggarwal's article corrections and retractions; no such lawsuit was ever realized. In February 2016, the journal Biochemical Pharmacology retracted seven of Aggarwal's research articles, six of which had Aggarwal as senior or first author, because "the data integrity has become questionable." Also in February 2016, MD Anderson Cancer Center confirmed that Aggarwal had retired from the Center on December 31, 2015.

In June 2016, following an investigation by MD Anderson Cancer Center, the journal Molecular Pharmacology retracted two of Aggarwal's papers, citing “inappropriate” or “unacceptable” image manipulation. By April 2018, 19 of Aggarwal's articles, published in seven research journals, had been retracted. In September 2018, an additional nine articles by Aggarwal were retracted in journals published by the American Association for Cancer Research.

In February 2018, a cancer conference in Chennai, India, co-organized by Aggarwal was promoted with the false claim that it was co-sponsored by the MD Anderson Cancer Center.

== Books ==
- Aggarwal, Bharat B.; Yost, Debora (2011). Healing Spices: How to Use 50 Everyday and Exotic Spices to Boost Health and Beat Disease. Sterling. ISBN 978-1402776632.

== See also ==
- Scientific misconduct
- List of scientific misconduct incidents
