= List of Indian scientists =

List of scientists from India

The following article is a list of Indian scientists spanning from Ancient to Modern India, who have had a major impact in the field of science and technology.

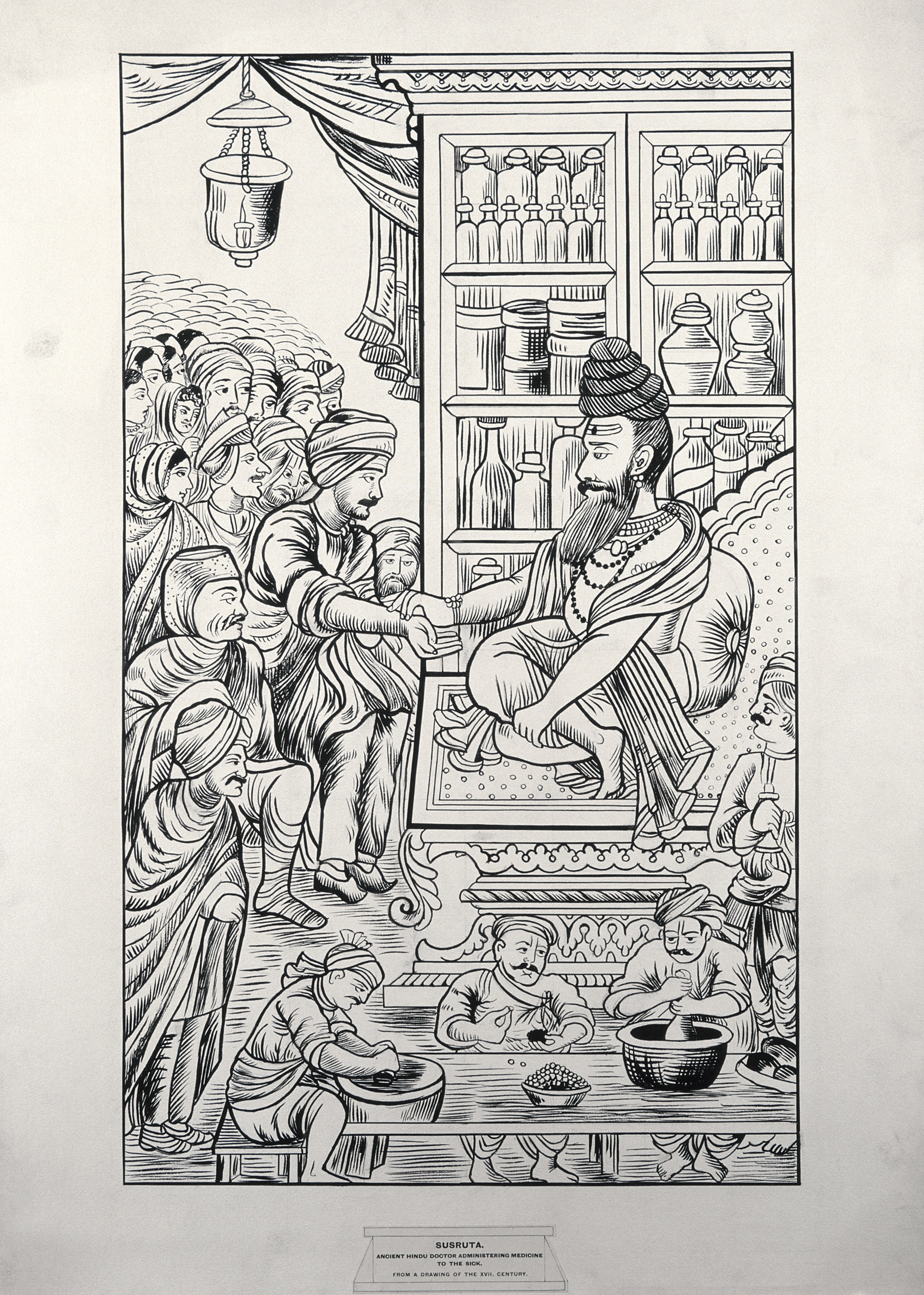
17th century pen drawing of Sushruta

== Ancient India (Pre 300 BCE) ==
- Lagadha, astronomer, author of one of the oldest known treatises on astrology (around late 2nd millennium BCE and early 1st millennium BCE)
- Baudhayana, mathematician, author of oldest surviving texts of Indian mathematics (around 1st millennium BCE)
- Uddalaka Aruni, metaphysicist, anticipated the idea of atom (aṅu) metaphysically (8th–6th century BCE)
- Atreya, physician, one of founding father of ayurveda (around 6th century BCE)
- Jivaka, physician, widely regarded as a model healer in the Eastern world during ancient times (5th century BCE)
- Sushruta, father of plastic surgery, author of Sushruta Samhita which is one of the most important ancient medical treatise (600–500 BCE)
- Panini, father of linguistics (600–400 BCE)
- Bogar, Alchemist (550-300 BCE)
- Charaka, physician (400–300 BCE)
- Kanada, natural scientist and philosopher who founded the Vaisheshika school of Indian philosophy which talks about atomism.(Unclear; 600–200 BCE)
- Shalihotra, veterinarian (3rd century BCE)

== Classical period (300 BCE–500 CE) ==
- Pingala, mathematician and linguist (3rd–2nd century BCE)
- Chanakya, polymath (375–283 BCE)
- Nagarjuna (metallurgist), alchemist and philosopher (150-250 CE)
- Aryabhata, mathematician and astronomer, author of Aryabhatiya (476–550 CE)
- Dignāga, logician (c. 480 – c. 540 CE)
- Dharmakīrti, logician (c. 600–670 CE;[1])

== Early medieval period (500–1000 CE) ==
- Varahamihira, astronomer (5th–6th century CE)
- Vagbhata, physician (6th century CE)
- Brahmagupta, mathematician and astronomer (598–688 CE)
- Bhaskara I, mathematician and astronomer (600–680 CE)
- Haridatta, astronomer (6th century CE)
- Lalla, astronomer and astrologer (720–790 CE)
- Madhava-kara, physician (7th–8th century CE)
- Virasena, logician and mathematician (792-853 CE)
- Gautama Siddha, astrologer, astronomer and compiler in Tang Dynasty, introduced 0 and Indian numerals in China (8th century CE)
- Shankaranarayana, astronomer and astrologist (840–900 CE)
- Mahavira, mathematician (9th century CE)
- Halayudha, mathematician (10th century CE)
- Aryabhata II, mathematician and astronomer (920–1000 CE)
- Manjula, astronomer (Born 932 CE)
- Utpala, astronomer (9th–10th CE)
- Vijayanandi, astronomer (940–1010 CE)
- Somadeva Suri, mechanical device maker (fl. 959–66, possibly born in Bengal region about 920)

== Late medieval period (1000–1500 CE) ==
- Bhoja, polymath, astronomer, alchemist, mathematician, architect, inventor (1000-1070 CE)
- Sripati, astronomer, astrologer and mathematician (1019–1066 CE)
- Brahmadeva, mathematician and astronomer (1061–1130 CE)
- Satananda, astronomer (1068–1099 CE)
- Bhaskara II, mathematician and astronomer (1114–1185 CE)
- Śārṅgadeva, musicologist and mathematician (1175-1247)
- Suryadeva Yajvan, astronomer and astrologer (1191– at least 1248 CE)
- Govinda Bhattathiri, astronomer and astrologer (1237–1295 CE)
- Gangesha Upadhyaya, logician, founder of navya nyaya school (first half of the 14th century)
- Narayana Pandita (mathematician), mathematician (1340-1400 CE)
- Madhava of Sangamagrama, mathematician and astronomer, founded Kerala school of astronomy and mathematics (1340–1425 CE)
- Mahendra Suri, astronomer, wrote the Yantraraja, the first Indian treatise on the astrolabe (1340–1400 CE)
- Parameshvara Nambudiri, astronomer (1380–1460 CE)
- Makaranda, astronomer (fl. 1438-1478)
- Nilakantha Somayaji, astronomer (1444–1544 CE)
- Damodara, astronomer (15th century CE)
- Raghunatha Siromani, logician (1475–1550)
- Keshava of Nandigrama, astrologer and astronomer (1496–1507)

== Early modern period (1500–1800 CE) ==
- Jyesthadeva, astronomer (1500–1575 CE)
- Paarangot Jyeshtadevan Namboodiri, mathematician and astronomer (1500–1610 CE)
- Shankara Variyar, astronomer and mathematician (1500–1560 CE)
- Gaṇeśa Daivajna, astronomer and mathematician (1520-1554 CE)
- Achyutha Pisharadi, Sanskrit linguist, astronomer, astrologer and mathematician (1550–1621 CE)
- Kṛṣṇa Daivajña, mathematicians (16th - 17th century)
- Nilakantha Daivajna, astronomer and astrologer (6th century CE)
- Munishvara, astronomer and mathematician (1603 - 1670)
- Kamalakara, astronomer and mathematician (1616–1700 CE)
- Puthumana Somayaji, astronomer and mathematician (1660–1740 CE)
- Jagannatha Samrat, astronomer and mathematician (1652–1744 CE)
- Sawai Jai Singh, ruler and astronomer, commissioned Jantar Mantar observatory (1688–1743 CE)
- Sankara Varman, astronomer and mathematician (1774–1839 CE)

== 19th century CE ==
- Radhanath Sikdar, mathematician, calculated height of Mt. Everest (1813–1870 CE)
- Gode Venkata Juggarow, astronomer (1817–1856 CE)
- Pathani Samanta, astronomer (1835–1904 CE)
- Jagdish Chandra Bose, polymath, father of radio science (1858–1937 CE)
- Sir M. Visvesvaraya, civil engineer and statesman (1861–1962 CE)
- Prafulla Chandra Ray, chemist (1861–1944 CE)
- Shankar Abaji Bhise, invented type setting machine (1867–1935 CE)
- Indumadhab Mallick, polymath, inventor of icmic cooker (1869–1917 CE)
- Upendranath Brahmachari, physician (1873–1946 CE) synthesised urea-stibamine (carbostibamide) for the treatment of Kala-azar visceral leishmaniasis
- Shiv Ram Kashyap, botanist (1882–1934 CE)
- Darashaw Nosherwan Wadia, geologist (1883–1969 CE)
- Pandurang Sadashiv Khankhoje, scholar and agronomist (1884–1967 CE)
- M. O. P. Iyengar, botanist and phycologist (1886–1963 CE)
- Chandrasekhara Venkata Raman (C. V. Raman), physicist (1888–1970 CE)
- Srinivasa Ramanujan, mathematician (1887–1920 CE)
- Satya Churn Law, naturalist and ornithologist (1888–1984 CE)
- Sisir Kumar Mitra, radio and atmospheric physicist (1890–1963 CE)
- Birbal Sahni, paleobotanist (1891–1949 CE)
- Gopalswamy Doraiswamy Naidu, inventor of the first electric motor in India (1893-1974 CE)
- K. R. Ramanathan, physicist and meteorologist (1893–1984 CE)
- K. Ananda Rau, mathematician (1893–1966 CE)
- Meghnad Saha, astrophysicist (1893–1956 CE)
- Prasanta Chandra Mahalanobis, statistician (1893–1972 CE)
- Jnan Chandra Ghosh, chemist (1894–1959 CE)
- Nikhil Ranjan Sen, mathematical physicist (1894-1963 CE)
- Satyendra Nath Bose, theoretical physicist, father of God Particle (1894–1974 CE)
- Shanti Swarup Bhatnagar, colloid chemist (1894–1955 CE)
- Yellapragada Subbarow, biochemist (1895–1948 CE)
- Sunder Lal Hora, ichthyologist (1896–1955 CE)
- Salim Ali, ornithologist and naturalist (1896–1987 CE)
- Janaki Ammal, botanist (1897–1984 CE)
- K.S. Krishnan, physicist (1898–1961 CE)
- M. S. Krishnan, geologist (1898–1970 CE)
- Kotcherlakota Rangadhama Rao, physicist (1898–1972 CE)

== Early 20th century CE ==
- Kedareswar Banerjee, crystallographer (1900–1975 CE)
- L. A. Ramdas, physicist and meteorologist (1900–1979 CE)
- Raj Chandra Bose, mathematician (1901-1987 CE)
- Subbayya Sivasankaranarayana Pillai, mathematician (1901–1950 CE)
- Panchanan Maheshwari, botanist, invented test-tube fertilisation technique of Angiosperms (1904–1966 CE)
- Kailas Nath Kaul, agronomist (1905–1983 CE)
- Benjamin Peary Pal, agronomist (1906–1989 CE)
- Daulat Singh Kothari, physicist (1906–1993 CE)
- Vishnu Vasudev Narlikar, physicist (1908–1991 CE)
- Homi Jehangir Bhabha, nuclear physicist, father of Indian nuclear programme (1909–1966 CE)
- Nautam Bhatt, physicist (1909–2005 CE)
- P.R. Pisharoty, physicist and meteorologist (1909–2002 CE)
- Suri Bhagavantam, physicist (1909–1989 CE)
- Sarvadaman Chowla. mathematician (1907-1995)
- Subramanyan Chandrasekhar, theoretical physicist, known for Chandrasekhar Limit (1910–1995 CE)
- Kamala Sohonie, biochemist (1911–1998 CE)
- A. S. Rao, physicist (1914–2003 CE)
- Matthew Pothen Thekaekara, Jesuit priest who published the Thekaekara spectrum (1914–1974 AD)
- Sambhu Nath De, pathologist (1915–1985 CE)
- Asima Chatterjee, chemist (1917–2006 CE)
- M. S. Balakrishnan, phycologist (1917–1990 CE)
- Waman Dattatreya Patwardhan, nuclear chemist (1917–2007 CE)
- Anna Mani, physicist and meteorologist (1918–2001 CE)
- Prahalad Chunnilal Vaidya, physicist and mathematician (1918–2010 CE)
- Shya Chitaley, paleobotanist (1918–2013 CE)
- V. S. Huzurbazar, statistician (1919–1991 CE)
- Vikram Sarabhai, physicist and astronomer, established Physical Research Laboratory (1919–1971 CE)
- Calyampudi Radhakrishna Rao, mathematical statistician (1920–2023)
- K. S. Chandrasekharan, mathematician (1920–2017 CE)
- Satish Dhawan, aerospace engineer (1920–2002 CE)
- Siva Brata Bhattacherjee, X-ray crystallographer (1921–2003 CE)
- Vasudeva Krishnamurthy, algologist (1921–2014 CE)
- G. N. Ramachandran, biophysicist (1922–2001 CE)
- Har Gobind Khorana, biochemist (1922–2011 CE)
- Yelavarthy Nayudamma, chemical engineer (1922–1985 CE)
- Amal Kumar Raychaudhuri, theoretical physicist (1923–2005 CE)
- B. V. Sreekantan, astrophysicist (1923–2019 CE)
- Homi Sethna, nuclear physicist and chemist (1923–2010 CE)
- Harish-Chandra, mathematician and physicist (1923–1983 CE)
- Ranjan Roy Daniel, physicist (1923–2005 CE)
- M. S. Swaminathan, agronomist (1925–2023 CE)
- Nitya Anand, medicinal chemist (1925–2024 CE)
- Raja Ramanna, nuclear physicist (1925–2004 CE)
- Narinder Singh Kapany, physicist (1926–2020 CE)
- Syed Zahoor Qasim, marine biologist (1926–2015 CE)
- Samarendra Nath Biswas, theoretical physicist (1926–2005 CE)
- Yash Pal, space scientist (1926–2017 CE)
- Gopinath Kartha, crystallographer (1927–1984 CE)
- Purnima Sinha, physicist (1927–2015 CE)
- Tanjore Ramachandra Anantharaman, metallurgist (1927–2009 CE)
- Vainu Bappu, astronomer (1927–1982 CE)
- M. G. K. Menon, physicist (1928–2016 CE)
- U. Aswathanarayana, geologist (1928–2016 CE)
- Asoke Nath Mitra, theoretical physicist (1929–2022 CE)
- Arvind Joshi, computational linguist (1929–2017 CE)
- Amar Bose, electrical engineer (1929–2013 CE)
- Govind Swarup, radioastronomer (1929–2020 CE)
- Kookal Ramunni Krishnan, physician (1929–1999 CE)
- Krityunjai Prasad Sinha, theoretical physicist (1929–2023 CE)
- Shrinivas Kulkarni, mathematician (1930–2012 CE)
- A. P. J. Abdul Kalam, aerospace engineer, missile man of India (1931–2015 CE)
- E. C. George Sudarshan, theoretical physicist (1931–2018 CE)
- Manilal Bhaumik, physicist (1931–present CE)
- Nilamber Pant, space scientist (1931–present CE)
- P. K. Iyengar, nuclear physicist (1931–2011 CE)
- Surindar Kumar Trehan, mathematician (1931–2004 CE)
- C. S. Seshadri, mathematician (1932–2020 CE)
- Ganeshan Venkataraman, condensed matter physicist (1932–present CE)
- M. S. Narasimhan, mathematician (1932–2021 CE)
- Obaid Siddiqi, biologist (1932–2013 CE)
- Ratan Lal Brahmachary, biochemist (1932–2018 CE)
- Udipi Ramachandra Rao, space scientist (1932–2017 CE)
- Daya-Nand Verma, mathematician (1933–2012 CE)
- Amartya Sen, economist and philosopher (1933–present CE)
- Vasant Ranchhod Gowarikar, meteorologist (1933–2015 CE)
- Roddam Narasimha, aerospace scientist and fluid dynamicist (1934–2020 CE)
- Ajoy Ghose, mining engineer (1934–2019 CE)
- C. N. R. Rao, chemist (1934–present CE)
- Gandikota V. Rao, atmospheric scientist (1934–2004 CE)
- Subramania Ranganathan, bioorganic chemist (1934–2016 CE)
- S. Pancharatnam, optical physicist (1934–1969 CE)
- Animesh Chakravorty, chemist (1935–present CE)
- Vinod Johri, astrophysicist (1935–2015 CE)
- E. S. Raja Gopal, condensed matter physicist (1936–2018 CE)
- Jasbir Singh Bajaj, physician and diabetologist (1936–2019 CE)
- Rajagopala Chidambaram, nuclear physicist (1936–2025 CE)
- Yusuf Hamied, pharmaceutical scientist, (1936–present CE)
- Dronamraju Krishna Rao, geneticist (1937–2020 CE)
- B. L. K. Somayajulu, geochemist (1937–2016 CE)
- Jogesh Pati, theoretical physicist (1937–present CE)
- Raj Reddy, computer scientist (1937–present CE)
- Raghavan Narasimhan, mathematician, solved Levi problem for complex manifolds (1937–2015 CE)
- Subhash Mukhopadhyay, physician (1937–1981 CE)
- Ganapathi Thanikaimoni, palynologist (1938–1986 CE)
- A. P. Balachandran, theoretical physicist (1938–present CE)
- Chanchal Kumar Majumdar, condensed matter physicist (1938–2000 CE)
- Govindarajan Padmanabhan, biochemist and biotechnologist (1938–present CE)
- Jayant Narlikar, astrophysicist (1938–2025 CE)
- Shipra Guha-Mukherjee, botanist (1938–2007 CE)
- Ajoy Ghatak, physicist (1939–present CE)
- Dadaji Ramaji Khobragade, agronomist (1939–2018 CE)
- V. K. Aatre, electrical engineer (1939–present CE)
- K. R. K. Easwaran, molecular biophysicist (1939–present CE)
- M. L. Madan, biotechnologist (1939–present CE)
- Narasimhaiengar Mukunda, theoretical physicist (1939–present CE)
- Surendra Nath Pandeya, medicinal and organic chemist (1939–2012 CE)
- Ramamurti Rajaraman, theoretical physicist (1939–present CE)
- Krishnaswamy Kasturirangan, space scientist (1940–present CE)
- Sujoy K. Guha, biomedical engineer (1940–present CE)
- Darshan Ranganathan, organic chemist (1941–2001 CE)
- M. S. Raghunathan, mathematician (1941–present CE)
- Nambi Narayanan, aerospace engineer (1941–present CE)
- T. V. Ramakrishnan, theoretical physicist (1941–present CE)
- Madhav Gadgil, ecologist (1942–present CE)
- Patcha Ramachandra Rao, metallurgist (1942–2010 CE)
- Probir Roy, particle physicist (1942–present CE)
- Ravindra Shripad Kulkarni, mathematician, known for Kulkarni-Nomizu product (1942–present CE)
- Shivram Bhoje, nuclear physicist (1942–present CE)
- Subhendu Guha, photovoltaicist (1942–present CE)
- Sam Pitroda, telecommunication engineer (1942–present CE)
- Aditi Pant, oceanographer (1943–present CE)
- G Madhavan Nair, space scientist (1943–present CE)
- Anil Kakodkar, nuclear physicist (1943–present CE)
- Raghunath Anant Mashelkar, chemical engineer (1943–present CE)
- V. Balakrishnan, theoretical physicist (1943–present CE)
- Abhay Bhushan, computer scientist (1944–present CE)
- Avinash Kak, computer scientist (1944–present CE)
- Jagdish Shukla, meteorologist (1944–present CE)
- Naresh Dadhich, theoretical physicist (1944–present CE)
- Phoolan Prasad, mathematician (1944–present CE)
- S. A. Hussain, ornithologist (1944–2009 CE)
- Tej P Singh, biophysicist (1944–present CE)
- Vijay Kumar Kapahi, astrophysicist (1944–1999 CE)
- K. N. Shankara, space scientist (1945–2017 CE)
- Prem Chand Pandey, planetary scientist (1945–present CE)
- Subhash Chandra Lakhotia, cytogeneticist (1945–present CE)
- Ranajit Chakraborty, geneticist (1946–2018 CE)
- Srikumar Banerjee, metallurgical engineer (1946–2021 CE)
- Sudipta Sengupta, structural geologist (1946–present CE)
- Vijay P. Bhatkar, computer scientist (1946–present CE)
- A. Sivathanu Pillai, aerospace engineer (1947–present CE)
- Dattatreyudu Nori, radiation oncologist (1947–present CE)
- Mathukumalli Vidyasagar, control theorist (1947–present CE)
- Prem Shanker Goel, space scientist (1947–present CE)
- Sushanta Kumar Dattagupta, condensed matter physicist (1947–present CE)
- Archana Bhattacharyya, physicist (1948–present CE)
- K. S. R. Krishna Raju, ornithologist (1948–2002 CE)
- M. R. S. Rao, biologist (1948–2023 CE)
- Predhiman Krishan Kaw, plasma physicist (1948–2017 CE)
- Thirumalachari Ramasami, leather scientist (1948–present CE)
- Abhay Ashtekar, theoritical physicist (1949–present CE)
- Jyeshtharaj Joshi, chemist and nuclear physicist (1949–present CE)
- K. Radhakrishnan, space scientist (1949–present CE)
- Sulabha K. Kulkarni, nanotechnologist (1949–present CE)
- V. K. Saraswat, aeronautic engineer (1949–present CE)
- Lilabati Bhattacharjee, mineralogist and crystallographer (unknown)
- Ram Chet Chaudhary, agronomist (unknown)
- Radha Balakrishnan, theoretical physicist (unknown)

== Late 20th century CE ==
- Gomatam Ravi, quantum physicist (1950–present CE)
- Jitendra Nath Goswami, astrophysicist (1950–present CE)
- Kamanio Chattopadhyay, materials engineer (1950–present CE)
- Sankar K. Pal, computer scientist (1950–present CE)
- Chitra Mandal, biologist (1951–present CE)
- Daya Shankar Kulshreshtha, theoretical physicist (1951–present CE)
- H. R. Krishnamurthy, theoretical physicist (1951–present CE)
- Himmatrao Bawaskar, physician (1951–present CE)
- Indrani Bose, theoretical physicist (1951–present CE)
- Swapan Chattopadhyay, physicist (1951–present CE)
- Amitava Raychaudhuri, particle physicist (1952–present CE)
- G. R. Desiraju, structural chemist (1952–present CE)
- A. S. Kiran Kumar, space scientist (1952–present CE)
- Bikas Chakrabarti, physicist (1952–present CE)
- N. Sasidharan, botanist (1952–present CE)
- Rohini Godbole, physicist (1952–2024 CE)
- Salim Yusuf, physician (1952–present CE)
- Samir K. Brahmachari, biophysicist (1952–present CE)
- Venkatraman Ramakrishnan, structural biologist (1952–present CE)
- Vidya Arankalle, virologist (1952–present CE)
- Amar Gupta, computer scientist (1953–present CE)
- Ghanshyam Swarup, molecular biologist (1953–present CE)
- Michael Lobo, genealogist (1953–present CE)
- S. K. Shivakumar, space communications engineer (1953–2019 CE)
- Shobhona Sharma, molecular biologist (1953–present CE)
- Veena Parnaik, cell biologist (1953–present CE)
- Shubha Venkatesha Iyengar, physicist specializing in aviation (1954–presemt CE)
- Biman Bagchi, chemist (1954–present CE)
- C. K. Raju, polymath (1954–present CE)
- Ravindra Kumar Sinha, biologist (1954–present CE)
- Harsh Vardhan Batra, biotechnologist (1955–present CE)
- Ashoke Sen, theoretical physicist (1956–present CE)
- Gaiti Hasan, molecular biologist (1956–present CE)
- Narendra Karmarkar, mathematician, developed Karmakar algorithm (1956–present CE)
- Shrinivas Kulkarni, astronomer (1956–present CE)
- Sunil Mukhi, theoretical physicist (1956–present CE)
- Varun Sahni, theoretical physicist (1956–present CE)
- K. Sivan, aerospace engineer (1957–present CE)
- Thanu Padmanabhan, theoretical physicist (1957–2021 CE)
- R.K. Kotnala, scientist (1957–present CE)
- Mylswamy Annadurai, aerospace engineer (1958–present CE)
- Nagendra Kumar Singh, agronomist (1958–present CE)
- Pamposh Bhat, environmentalist (1958–present CE)
- Santanu Bhattacharya, chemical biologist (1958–present CE)
- Vinod K. Singh, chemist (1959–present CE)
- Debasish Ghose, robotics engineer (1960–present CE)
- Biswarup Mukhopadhyaya, high-energy physicist (1960–present CE)
- Ram Rajasekharan, biologist (1960–present CE)
- Madan Rao, condensed matter and biological physicist (1960–present CE)
- Bharat Ratra, cosmologist and astroparticle physicist (1960–present CE)
- K. Sridhar, physicist (1961–present CE)
- Lov Grover, computer scientist (1961–present CE)
- P. Kunhikrishnan, space scientist (1961–present CE)
- Tapan Misra, digital hardware engineer (1961–present CE)
- Kalpana Chawla, astronaut and aerospace engineer (1962–2003 CE)
- Rajeev Motwani, theoretical computer scientist (1962–2009 CE)
- Shekhar C. Mande, computational biologist (1962–present CE)
- Uddhab Bharali, inventor, invented pomegrante de-seeder (1962–present CE)
- Gajendra Pal Singh Raghava, bioinformatician (1963–present CE)
- Sandip Trivedi, theoretical physicist (1963–present CE)
- VA Shiva Ayyadurai, systems biologist (1963–present CE)
- V. S. Subrahmanian, computer scientist (1963–present CE)
- S. Somanath, aerospace engineer (1963–present CE)
- Upinder Singh Bhalla, computational neuroscientist (1963–present CE)
- Charusita Chakravarty, chemist (1964–2016 CE)
- Abhik Ghosh, inorganic chemist (1964–present CE)
- Usha Kulshreshtha, theoretical physicist (1964–present CE)
- Ujjwal Maulik, computer scientist (1965–present CE)
- Manjula Reddy, bacterial geneticist (1965–present CE)
- Arun K. Pati, quantum physicist (1966–present CE)
- Manindra Agrawal, computer scientist (1966–present CE)
- G. K. Ananthasuresh, quantum physicist (1967–present CE)
- Giridhar Madras, mechanical engineer (1967–present CE)
- Rajesh Gopakumar, theoretical physicist (1967–present CE)
- Shubha Tole, neuroscientist (1967–present CE)
- Sanghamitra Bandyopadhyay, computational biologist (1968–present CE)
- Ramesh Raskar, computer scientist (1970–present CE)
- Hari Balakrishnan, computer scientist (1971–present CE)
- G. Naresh Patwari, chemist (1972–present CE)
- Shiraz Minwalla, theoretical physicist (1972–present CE)
- Subramanian Anantha Ramakrishna, optical and condensed matter physicist (1972–present CE)
- Aloke Paul, chemical engineer (1973–present CE)
- Ambarish Ghosh, materials scientist (1973–present CE)
- Kewal Krishan, forensic anthropologist (1973–present CE)
- Rajeev Kumar Varshney, agronomist and geneticist (1973–present CE)
- Manjul Bhargava, mathematician (1974–present CE)
- Yamuna Krishnan, organic chemist (1974–present CE)
- Ritu Karidhal, aerospace engineer (1975–present CE)
- Nishith Gupta, molecular biologist (1977–present CE)
- Pragya D. Yadav, virologist (1978–present CE)
- Akhilesh K. Gaharwar, biomedical engineer (1982–present CE)
- Pranav Mistry, computer scientist, invented Samsung's SixthSense (1984–present CE)
- Ashish Vaswani, Computer scientist (1986–present CE)
- Tathagat Avatar Tulsi, physicist (1987–present CE)
- Praveen Kumar Gorakavi, polymath (1989–present CE)
- Alex James, computer scientist (unknown)
- Anang Tadar, inventor and researcher (unknown)
- Bola Vithal Shetty, chemist (unknown)
- Dipan Ghosh, theoretical physicist (unknown)
- Gursaran Talwar, physician (unknown)
- Kavita Shah, biotechnologist (unknown)
- K. N. Ganeshaiah, agronomist (unknown)
- Anita Mahadevan-Jansen, biomedical engineer (unknown)
- Mirza Faizan, aerospace scientist (unknown)
- Maneesha S. Inamdar, biologist (unknown)
- Nandini Harinath, aerospace engineer (unknown)
- Padmanabhan Balaram, biochemist (unknown)
- Rashna Bhandari, biologist (unknown)
- Rama Govindarajan, fluid dynamicist (unknown)
- Rama Shankar Singh, geneticist (1945–present CE)
- Rohini Balakrishnan, bioacousticist (unknown)
- Seema Bhatnagar, synthetic chemist (unknown)
- Shoba Sivasankar, geneticist (unknown)
- Siva S. Banda, aerospace engineer (unknown)
- Sivaram Murthy, computer scientist (unknown)
- Subhash Kak, computer scientist (unknown)
- Subrata Roy, fluid dynamicist (unknown)
- Somak Raychaudhury, astrophysicist (unknown)
- Sudhir Kumar Vempati, high-energy physicist (unknown)
- Suchitra Sebastian, condensed matter physicist (unknown)
- Uma Ramakrishnan, molecular ecologist (unknown)
- Umesh Waghmare, physicist (unknown)

== See also ==
- Lists of scientists
- List of Indians
- List of Indian mathematicians
- List of Indian astronauts
