= Srinivasa Chakravarthy =

- Education: Indian Institute of Technology, Madras (B. Tech): University of Texas at Austin (MS) and (Ph.D.); Baylor College of Medicine (PDF)
- Occupations: Professor, IITM-Chennai
- Years active: 1990 to present

Srinivasa Chakravarthy is an Indian scientist doing research in the field of biotechnology. He is working as a professor at the Indian Institute of Technology, Chennai. He established theories of communication that bridge mathematics and neuroscience. He is actively doing research in the field of Computational Neuroscience.

== Education and research ==
In 1989, Chakravarthy was graduated from the Indian Institute of Technology, Chennai in the Department of Electrical Engineering. Following that in 1991, he received a master's degree in biomedical engineering from the University of Texas at Austin. He received his Ph.D. in 1996 from the same university where he did doctoral research in the field of Electronics and Computers from 1991 to 1996. In the year 1997, Chakravarthy completed his postdoctoral research in Neurology at Baylor College of Medicine in Houston.

He has developed a web-based system that understands handwritten text in Indian languages such as Hindi, Telugu, Kannada and Tamil. He is doing research in Computational Neuroscience and Computational Cardiovascular Pathology.

Sparsh Bharati, a font developed by Chakravarthy and his colleagues, is known as a guide for the visually impaired. He is leading a project to develop a computational programming model that could lead to a cure for Parkinson's disease, which is caused by the loss of cells in the basal ganglia, a part of the brain. Students from the Indian Institute of Technology, Chennai in 1972 contributed funds to build a Parkinson's Disease Diagnostic Laboratory to assist with this project in the Computational Neuroscience Laboratory.

== Publications ==
=== Books ===
- Demystifying the Brain: A Computational Approach, Springer, 2018
- Autobiography Of Charles Darwin - Darwin Atmakatha
- Computational Neuroscience Models of the Basal Ganglia - Cognitive Science and Technology, Springer Verlag, Singapore, 2018
