= Laghumānasa =

Sanskrit astronomical text (c. 932 CE)

Laghu-mānasa
- Author: Mañjula
- Original title: लघुमानस
- Translator: N.K. Majumdar, Kripa Shankar Shukla
- Language: Sanskrit
- Subject: Astronomical calculations
- Genre: karana
- Publication date: c. 932 CE
- Publication place: Ancient India
- English publication date: 1951, 1990

Laghu-mānasa (c. 932 CE) is a Sanskrit-language text on astronomy by the Indian astronomer Mañjula. It is a karana text containing simple rules for astronomical calculations, aimed at panchanga-makers. It remained highly popular across a vast region of present-day India for several years: the first pre-modern commentary on it was written in Kashmir in 958, and the last one was written in 1732 in Kerala.

== Date and authorship ==
Laghu-mānasa is the only surviving work of Mañjula, whose geographic location is not known. Mañjula adopted 10 March 932 CE (Saturday noon of Chaitra 1, Shaka 854) as the epoch of calculation in text, which suggests that he started composing the text sometime in 932 CE.

According to Surya-deva Yajva's commentary on the text, Mañjula studied several works on astronomy, and summarized them in an earlier work called Laghu-mānasa. He asked one of his pupils to take a copy of the work to the local king. The pupil did so, but took credit for writing the work. When Mañjula later visited the king, he asked the king to test him and the pupil by making them write another text on the same day, in the king's custody. Mañjula then wrote the present-day Laghu-mānasa, while the pupil was unable to write anything. The king banished the pupil, rewarded Mañjula, and popularized the latest Laghu-mānasa.

== Content ==
Laghu-mānasa, also called Laghumanāsam, is a karana text, that is, a work containing short and simple rules for astronomical calculations aimed to help the panchanga-makers. It is the smallest karana text of classical Indian astronomy: the main text contains 60 anushtubh-metre verses that provide the rules, plus an additional 5 arya-metre verses that provide the epochal constants required for the calculations. According to commentator Surya-deva Yajva, Mañjula wrote the additional verses in the arya metre so as not to mix up the constants with the main text, and to remind the reader to revise the consonants every 100 years.

The text provides much of the planetary model information known to the contemporary Indian astronomers, and appears to derive information from earlier sources including Aryabhata's various works (c. 500), Brahmagupta's Brahma-sphuta-siddhanta (c. 628 CE), and Lata-deva's Surya-siddhanta (6th century).

Content of the Laghu-mānasa as per K.S. Shukla's critical edition
| Verse(s) | Content |
|---|---|
| 1 | Introduction: description of the author as a Brahmana of the Bharadvaja gotra; objective of the text - to provide short and unprecedented rules for astronomical calculations |
| 2 | Conditions under which the specified rules will give accurate results |
| 3-4 | Calculation of dyugana, a variable used in other calculations |
| 5-10 | Rules for calculating mean positions |
| 11-12 | Definition of the terms kendra, bhuja, and koti used in other calculations |
| 13-17 | Computation of the equations of the centre and the true mean velocity of a planet |
| 18-19 | Lunar correction comprising the evection and the deficit of the Moon's equation of the centre |
| 20 | Correction for the local longitude |
| 21 | Calculation of the elements of the panchanga: tithi, karana, nakshatra, and yoga |
| 22 | Ascensional difference of the Sun |
| 23 | Oblique ascensions of the tropical signs |
| 24 | Longitude of the rising point of the ecliptic (lagna) and the corresponding time in nadis (ishtanadi) |
| 25 | Length of the day and the Sun's hour angle |
| 26-28 | Shadow of the gnomon |
| 29-30 | The sun's hour angle |
| 31-32 | Occurrence of the conjunction (in longitude) of two planets, and days elapsed since (or to elapse before) the conjunction |
| 33-35 | Diameters of the sun, the moon, the earth's shadow cone at the moon's distance, and the planets |
| 36-37 | Latitudes of the moon etc. |
| 38 | Distance between the centres of two planets at the time of their conjunction (in longitude) |
| 39 | Parallax in longitude |
| 40 | Meridian ecliptic point |
| 41 | Parallax in latitude |
| 42 | Correction for parallax in latitude |
| 43-52 | Eclipse-related calculations |
| 53 | Position of the sun at the time of the helical rising or setting of a planet |
| 53' | In Yallaya's commentary and a manuscript, this verse replaces verses 51–52, and provides rule for visibility corrections |
| 54 | Helical rising and setting of Canopus |
| 55 | True ascensional difference for a planet |
| 56 | Duration of the vyatīpāta and vaidhṛta phenomena |
| 57 | Shadow cast by the gnomon due to moonlight |
| 58 | Measure of bright or dark part of the moon |
| 59 | Depiction of the bright or dark part of the moon in the diagram |
| 59' | In Yallaya's commentary and a manuscript, this verse supplements verse 59 |
| 60 | Conclusion: number of verses in the book, warning to imitators |
| 1'-5' | Arya metre verses providing the epochal constants. Mañjula has provided certain constants, and the later commentators have revised these to suit their own period. One manuscript replaces these verses with 9 verses that provide the same constants plus some additional constants. |

=== Chapters ===
Different commentators divide the text into chapters in different ways. The critical edition by K.S. Shukla divides the text into 9 chapters (Sanskrit names in IAST):

1. Dhruvaka-nirūpaṇādhikāraḥ (Dhruvakas or constant parameters): Verses 1–2, 1'-5'
2. Madhyagatyadhikāraḥ (Mean motion): Verses 3-10
3. Sphuṭa-gatyadhikāraḥ (True motion): Verses 11-17
4. Prakirṇakādhikāraḥ (Miscellaneous topics): Verses 18-21
5. Tripraśnādhikāraḥ (The three problems): Verses 22-30
6. Graha-yuti-grahaṇadvaya-parilekhanādhikāraḥ (Conjunction of two planets, eclipses, and their graphical representation): Verses 31-50
7. Grahodayādhikāraḥ (Rising and setting of heavenly bodies): Verses 51-55
8. Mahāpātādhikāraḥ (Vyatīpāta and Vaidhṛta): Verse 56
9. Candraśṛṅgonnatyadhikāraḥ (Elevation of moon's horns): Verses 57-77

Pratashti-dhara divides the text into 8 chapters:

1. Dhruvaka-nirūpaṇādhikāra: Verses 1–2, 1'-5'
2. Madhyagatyadhikāra: Verses 3-10
3. Sphuṭa-gatyadhikāra: Verses 11-17
4. Prakirṇakādhikāra: Verses 18-21
5. Tripraśnādhikāra: Verses 22-30
6. Graha-yuti-grahaṇadvaya-parilekhanādhikāra: Verses 31-50
7. Grahodayāstadhikāraḥ: Verses 51-55
8. Mahāpātendu-śṛṅgonnatyadhikāra: Verses 56-60

Surya-deva Yajva divides the text into 4 chapters, sub-dividing the first chapter into 3 sections:

1. Chapter 1
  1. Madhyamādhikāra: Verses 1–10, 1'-5'
  2. Sphuṭa-gatyadhikāra: Verses 11-17
  3. Prakirṇakādhikāra: Verses 18-21
2. Tripraśnādhyāya: Verses 22-30
3. Grahaṇādhyāya: Verses 31-50
4. Grahodayāstamayādhikāra: Verses 51-60

Parameshvara's classification is almost same as that of Surya-deva Yajva, but he titles the fourth chapter Saṃkīrṇādhikāra. He includes an additional verse (53' in Shukla's critical edition), but states that some people omit it.

Yallaya and Bhūdhara divide the text into 8 chapters:

1. Madhya-grahādhikāra: Verses 1–10, 20
2. Graha-sphuṭādhikāra: Verses 11–19, 21
3. Tripraśnādhikāraḥ: Verses 22-30
4. Grahaṇa-graha-yuti-parilekhanādhyāya: Verses 31-50
5. Grahodayāstādhikāra: Verses 53' and 53-55
6. Mahāpātādhikāra: Verse 56
7. Candracchāyādhikāra: Verse 57
8. Candraśṛṅgonnatyadhikāra: Verses 58', 58-60

== Legacy ==
Laghu-mānasa provides short and simple calendaric methods, generally not known to the earlier Indian astronomers, and thus, became an important work in the Indian astronomy. It is the earliest known text to use the process of differentiation in finding the velocity of a planet. It also the earliest known Indian text to outline the lunar correction comprising evection (commentator Yallaya attributes this correction to the Vateshvara-siddhanta, but the surviving manuscripts of that work do not mention it). Unlike earlier astronomers, Mañjula rejects the theory of oscillatory motion of the equinoxes, and recommends a progressive precessional motion.

Laghu-mānasa was popular across a vast area of present-day India, as evident from the commentaries written on it. Commentators on the work include Prashastidhara of Kashmir, Surya-deva Yajva of Gangai-konda-Cholapuram (Tamil Nadu); Yallaya of Skanda-someshvara (Andhra Pradesh); Parameshvara of Alattur (Kerala), Bhudhara of Kampilya (Uttar Pradesh), and an anonymous commentator of Karnata-desha (Karnataka). Writers from several other places adopted or referred to Mañjula's work; for example, Bhoja of Malwa (Madhya Pradesh), Dashabala of Gujarat, Bhaskara II of Bida (Maharashtra), and Shri-datta of Nepala.

The work was especially popular in present-day Andhra Pradesh and Kerala, as late as until the 17th-18th centuries, as attested by the composition of Telugu (1695 CE) and Malayalam (1732 CE) commentaries there.

== Commentaries and derivative texts ==
Historical commentaries on the text include:

- Sanskrit commentary (958 CE) by Prashasti-dhara of Kashmir
- Sanskrit commentary (1248 CE) by Surya-deva Yajva of Andhra
- Sanskrit commentary (1409 CE) by Parameshvara of Kerala
- Sanskrit commentary (1486 CE) by Yallaya of Andhra
- Sanskrit commentary (1572 CE) by Bhudhara of Kampilya
- Sanskrit commentary by an unknown author from Karnata-desha (present-day Karnataka)
- Daivajñamanollāsa (1695 CE), Telugu commentary by Ayyalu Somayaji Balaya
- Malayalam commentary (1732 CE), attributed to Puthumana Soamayaji

The following historical works are derived from the Laghu-mānasa:

- A text (1178 CE), possibly a commentary, by Mallikarjuna Suri; quoted in Yallaya's commentary
  - A commentator on Mallikarjuna's work may have been responsible for introducing two corrections in Mañjula's work.
- Makaranda-mānasa (1478 CE), a now-lost work by Makaranda; mentioned in Bhudhara's commentary; possibly a revised edition of Laghu-mānasa with new initial constants (epoch)

Laghu-mānasaritya Surya-chandra-grahananayanam is a 16th-century text based on Laghu-mānasa

The following texts adopt Mañjula's rules:

- Rajamrganka (11th century), attributed to Bhoja of Malwa; adopts several of Mañjula's verses with or without alteration
- Ganakananda (1460 CE) of Surya Suri alias Suryacharya of Andhra, the teacher of Yallaya
- Siddhanta-sara (1596 CE) of Mallaya Yajva of Andhra
- Karanamrta(1530 CE) by Chitrabhanu of Shivapura (Covvuram) in present-day Kerala; adopts several verses
- Siddhanta-sangraha (1606 CE) of Vira Suri, son of Kottachenna of Andhra
- Graha-ganita-bhaskara(1613 CE) by Tamma Yajva of Andhra
- Karana-kamala-martanda of Dashabala; adopts Mañjula's formula for evection, and improves his formula for calculating the hour-angle from the day-length
- 'Karanottama of Achyuta (died 1621) of Kerala; adopts several verses with or without alteration

== Critical editions ==
A printed edition with commentary of Parameshvara was published as part of the Ānandāśrama Sanskrit Series from Pune in 1944. An English translation by N.K. Majumdar was published from Calcutta in 1951.

Kripa Shankar Shukla's critical edition of the text with an English translation and notes was published as a supplement to the Volume 25 of the Indian Journal of History of Science (1990) by the Indian National Science Academy, New Delhi. It was based on 11 manuscripts, available at Government Oriental Library (Mysore; now Oriental Research Institute), Government Oriental Manuscripts Library (Madras), and Sampurnananda Sanskrit University Library (Varanasi).
