= R.K. Kotnala =

Indian scientist

Dr. R.K. Kotnala
- Born: Ravinder Kumar Kotnala; 2 October 1957 (age 68); Kotnali village, Uttarakhand, India
- Education: Delhi Government School; Delhi University (Bachelor Degree); IIT Delhi (Ph D in Silicon Solar Cell) in 1982.
- Occupation: Scientist
- Years active: 1982 – present
- Notable work: Hydroelectric Cell, Green Hydrogen, Solar Cell, Spintronic Materials, Multiferroics, Ferrites, ISO based Quality System, Environmental Sciences & Biomedical Metrology.
- Website: rkkotnala.com

Ravinder Kumar Kotnala known as R.K. Kotnala is an Indian scientist. He has worked on topics such as hydroelectric cell, solar cells, magnetic materials & magnetic field measurements. He has been involved in organizations such as National Physical Laboratory, Department of Atomic Energy, and National Accreditation Board for Testing and Calibration Laboratories (NABL). He served as Head of Environmental Sciences & Biomedical Metrology in the CSIR-NPL.

== Awards and honours ==
Kotnala is one of the Honorary Professor at Amity Institute of Nanotechnology, Noida.

Year of award/honor	Name of award or honour	Awarding organization	Ref.
2008	MRSI Medal Award in Material Science (Magnetic Materials)	Materials Research Society of India (MRSI)	
2013	Academician	Asia Pacific Academy of Materials (APAM)	
2015	Fellow, National Academy of Sciences (NASI)	National Academy of Sciences, Allahabad	
2018	Raja Ramanna Fellow	Department of Atomic Energy, India	
2020	Chairman of National Accreditation Board for Testing and Calibration Laboratories (NABL)	Quality Council of India	
2018–present	President	Society for Scientific Values (SSV)	

== Selected publications ==
=== Books ===
- Verma, Kuldeek Chand; Negi, N. S.; Kotnala, R. K. (2016). Multiferroics: Nanoparticles and Thin Films. LAP LAMBERT Academic Publishing (published 22 April 2016). ISBN 9783659880193.
- Kotnala, R. K.; Singh, N. P. (1986). Essentials of Solar Cell. Allied Publishers Private.
- Kotnala, R. K.; Kotnala, V. K. (1987). Basic physics for IIT. Allied.
- Elements of Electronic Instrumentations. LAXMI. 1995.
