= Solar architecture =

Designing buildings to use the sun's heat and light

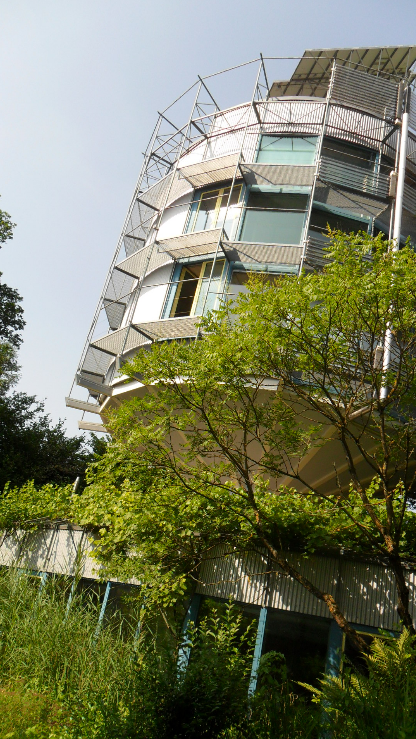
A heliotrope (on the top of the building) rotates to track the sun

Solar architecture is designing buildings to use the sun's heat and light to maximum advantage and minimum disadvantage, and especially refers to harnessing solar power. It is related to the fields of optics, thermics, electronics and materials science. Both active and passive strategies are involved.

The use of flexible thin-film photovoltaic modules provides fluid integration with steel roofing profiles, enhancing the building's design. Orienting a building to the sun, selecting materials with favorable thermal mass or light dispersing properties, and designing spaces that naturally circulate air also constitute solar architecture.

Improvements in solar architecture have been limited by the rigidity and weight of standard solar power panels. The continued development of photovoltaic (PV) thin film solar has provided a lightweight yet robust vehicle to harness solar energy to reduce a building's impact on the environment.

== History ==
The idea of passive solar building design first appeared in Greece around the fifth century BC. Up until that time, the Greeks' main source of fuel had been charcoal, but due to a major shortage of wood to burn they were forced to find a new way of heating their dwellings. With necessity as their motivation, the Greeks revolutionized the design of their cities. They began using building materials that absorbed solar energy, mostly stone, and started orienting the buildings so that they faced south. These revolutions, coupled with overhangs that kept out the hot summer sun, created structures which required very little heating and cooling. Socrates wrote, "In houses that look toward the south, the sun penetrates the portico in winter, while in summer the path of the sun is right over our heads and above the roof so that there is shade."

From this point on, most civilizations have oriented their structures to provide shade in the summer and heating in the winter. The Romans improved on the Greeks' design by covering the southern-facing windows with different types of transparent materials.

Another simpler example of early solar architecture is the cave dwellings in the southwestern regions of North America. Much like the Greek and Roman buildings, the cliffs in which the indigenous people of this region built their homes were oriented towards the south with an overhang to shade them from the midday sun during the summer months and capture as much of the solar energy during the winter as possible.

Active solar architecture involves the moving of heat and/or coolness between a temporary heat storage medium and a building, typically in response to a thermostat's call for heat or coolness within the building. While this principle sounds useful in theory, significant engineering problems have thwarted almost all active solar architecture in practice. The most common form of active solar architecture, rock bed storage with air as a heat transfer medium, usually grew toxic mold in the rock bed which was blown into houses, along with dust and radon in some cases.

A more complex and modern incarnation of solar architecture was introduced in 1954 with the invention of the photovoltaic cell by Bell Labs. Early cells were extremely inefficient and therefore not widely used, but throughout the years government and private research has improved the efficiency to a point where it is now a viable source of energy.

Universities were some of the first buildings to embrace the idea of solar energy. In 1973, the University of Delaware built Solar One, which was one of the world's first solar-powered houses.

As photovoltaic technologies keep advancing, solar architecture becomes easier to accomplish. In 1998 Guha Subhendu developed photovoltaic shingles, and recently a company called Oxford Photovoltaics has developed perovskite solar cells that are thin enough to incorporate into windows. Although the windows are not scaled to a size that can be taken advantage of on a commercial level yet, the company believes that the outlook is promising.

== Elements ==
=== Greenhouse ===
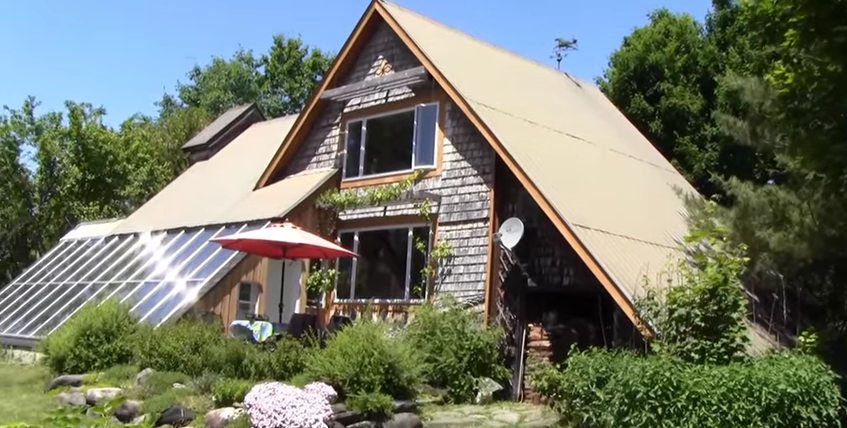
Greenhouse in Canada

A greenhouse keeps heat from the Sun. In a double glazed greenhouse, three effects occur: no convection (air blocking), ray keeping (the ground absorbs a photon, emits it with lower infrared energy, and the glass reflects this infrared to the ground), and little conduction (double glazing). It seems that the convection effect is the most important, as greenhouses in poor countries are made of plastic.

The greenhouse can be used to grow plants in the winter, to grow tropical plants, as a terrarium for reptiles or insects, or simply for air comfort. It must be ventilated, but not too much, otherwise the convection will make the inside colder, losing the desired effect. The greenhouse may be combined with heat storage or an opaque mask.

=== Photothermic module ===
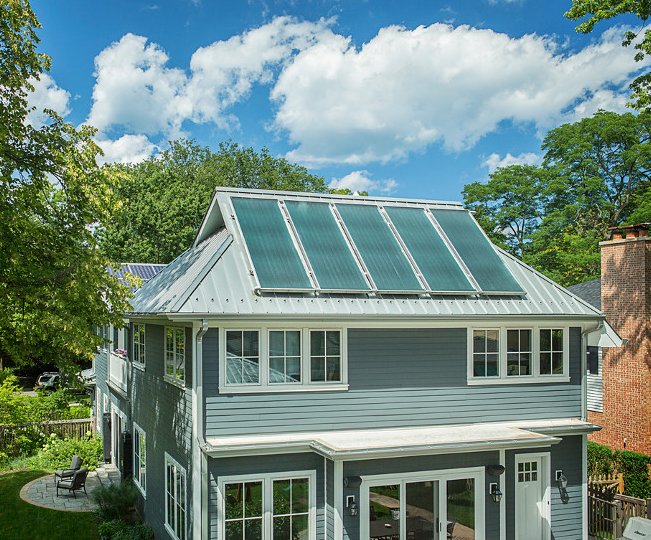
Photothermic modules on roof

Photothermic modules convert solar light into heat. They easily heat domestic water to 80 °C (353 K). They are put facing the sunny cardinal point, rather pointing towards the horizon to avoid overheating in summer, and take more calories in the winter. In a 45° North place, the module should face the south and the angle to the horizontal should be about 70°.

The use of intermediate solar heat systems like evacuated tubes, compound parabolic, and parabolic trough, is discussed as they correspond to specific, intermediate needs. A customer who wants a cheap system will prefer the photothermic, giving 80 °C (353 K) hot water with 70–85% efficiency. A customer who wants high temperatures will prefer the solar parabola, giving 200 °C (573 K) with 70–85% efficiency.

Do it yourself photothermic modules are cheaper and can use a spiral pipe, with hot water coming from the center of the module. Other geometries exist, like serpentine or quadrangular.

If on a flat roof, a mirror can be placed in front of the photothermic module to give it more sunlight.

The photothermic module has become popular in Mediterranean countries, with Greece and Spain counting with 30–40% of homes equipped with this system, and becoming part of the landscape.

=== Photovoltaic module ===
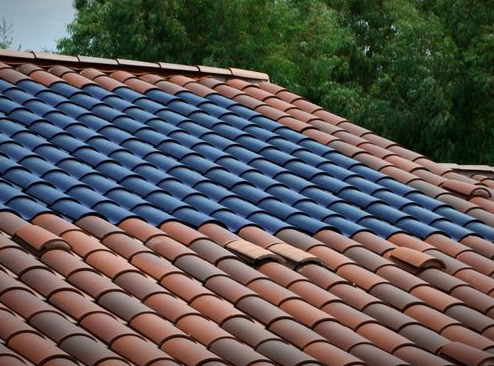
Photovoltaic tiles on roof

Photovoltaic modules convert solar light into electricity. Classical silicon solar modules have up to 25% efficiency but they are rigid and cannot easily be placed on curves. Thin film solar modules are flexible, but they have lower efficiency and lifetime.

A pragmatic rule is to put the photovoltaic surface facing the sunny cardinal point, with a latitude-equal angle to the horizontal. For example, if the house is 33° South, the photovoltaic surface should face the north with 33° to the horizontal. From this rule comes a general standard of roof angle, that is the norm in solar architecture.

=== Thermal storage ===
The simplest solar heat water system is to place a hot water storage tank towards the Sun and paint it black.

A thick ground of rock in a greenhouse will keep some heat through the night. The rock will absorb heat in the day and emit it in the night. Water has the most useful thermal capacity for a common material.

=== Electrical storage ===
In autonomous (off-grid) photovoltaic systems, batteries are used to store the excess of electricity, and deliver it when needed in the night.

Grid-connected systems can use interseasonal storage thanks to pumped-storage hydroelectricity. An innovative storage method, compressed air energy storage, is also being studied, and may be applied at the scale of a region or a home, whether a cave or a tank is used to store the compressed air.

=== White wall ===
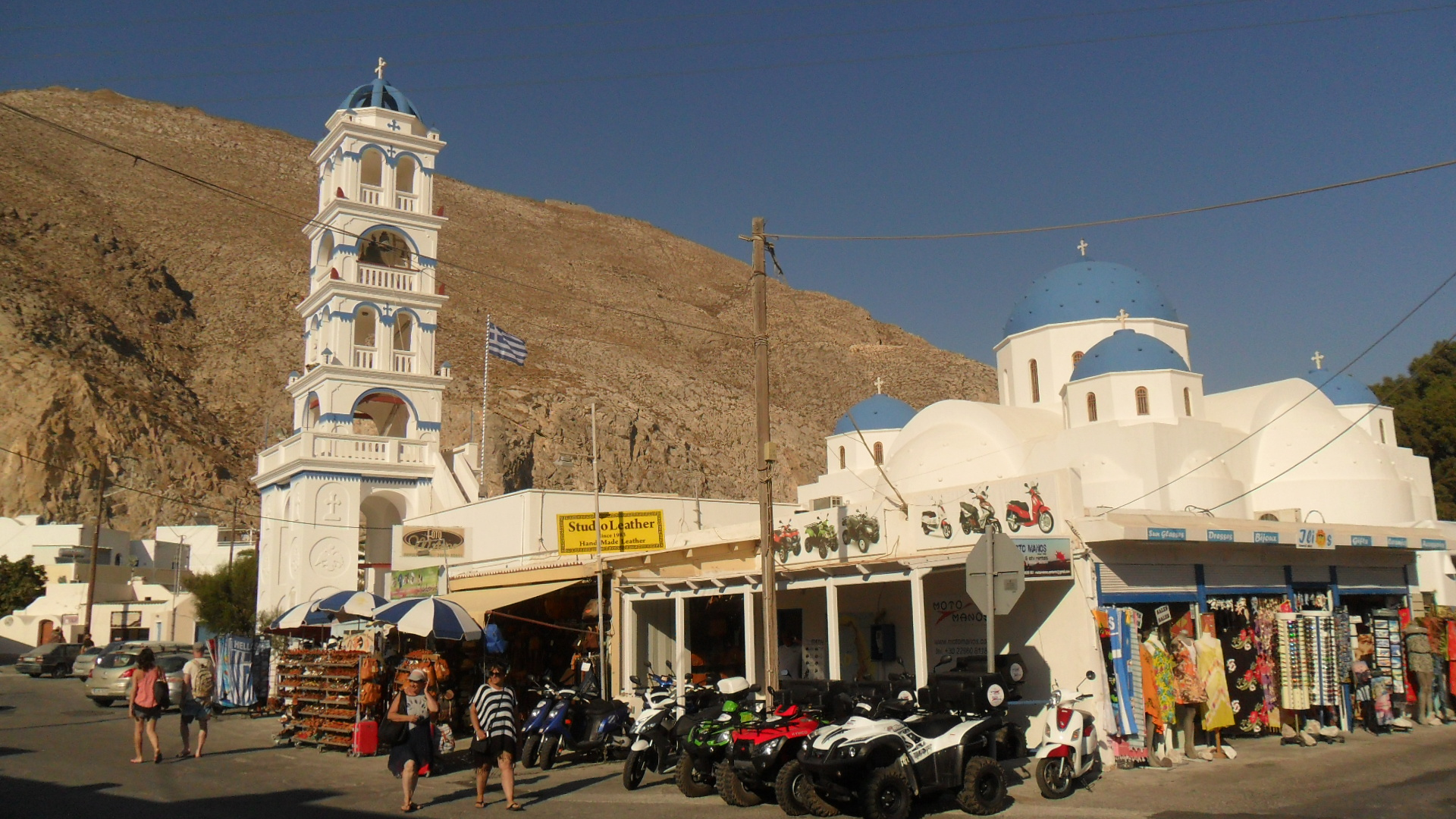
White walled church in Santorini

In the Greek islands, the houses are painted in white to keep from absorbing heat. The white walls covered with lime and the blue roofs make the Greek islands' traditional style appreciated by tourists for its colors, and by the inhabitants for the cooler interior air.

=== Black wall ===
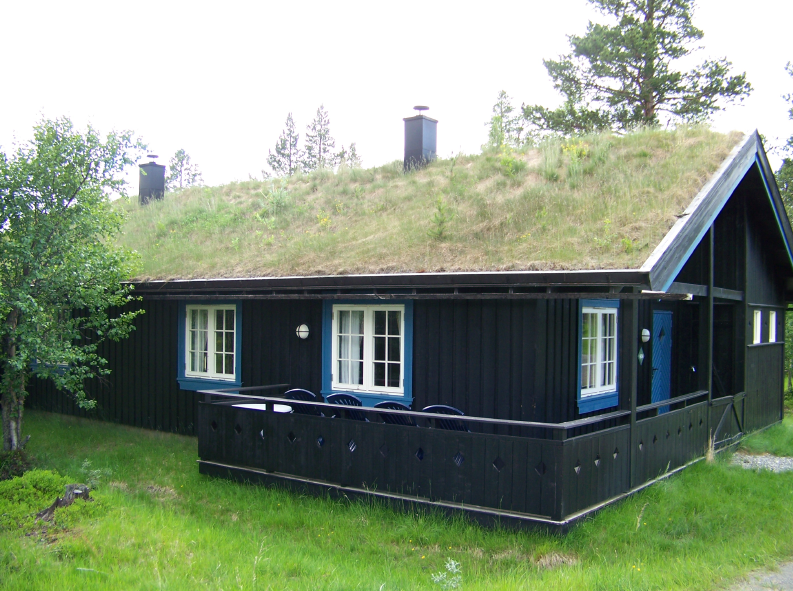
Black walled house in Norway

In Nordic countries, this is the opposite: the houses are painted in black to better absorb the irradiation heat. Basalt is an interesting material as it is naturally black and exhibits high thermal storage capacity.

=== Solar tracker ===
Part or all of the house can track the Sun's race in the sky to catch its light. The Heliotrope, the first positive energy house in the world, rotates to catch the sunlight, converted into electricity by photovoltaic modules, heating the house through the translucent glass.

Tracking requires electronics and automatics. There are two ways to let the system know where the Sun is: instrumental and theoretical. The instrumental method uses captors of light to detect the Sun's position. The theoretical method uses astronomical formulas to know the Sun's place. One or two axis motors will make the solar system rotate to face the Sun and catch more of its Sunlight.

A photovoltaic or photothermic module can gain more than 50% of production, thanks to a tracker system.

=== Solar mask ===
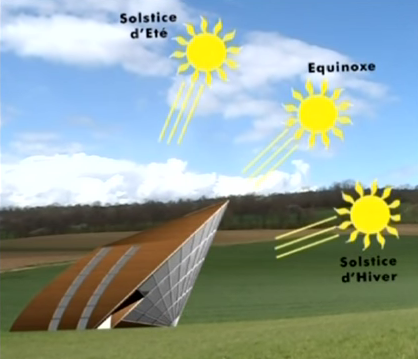
The Heliodome has shadow in the summer, and sunlight in the winter.

Sometimes the heat becomes too high, so a shadow may be desired. The Heliodome has been built in such a way that the roof hides the Sun in the summer to avoid overheating, and lets the sunlight pass in the winter.

As a mask, any opaque material is fine. A curtain, a cliff, or a wall can be solar masks. If a leafy tree is put in front of a greenhouse, it may hide the greenhouse in the summer, and let the sunlight enter in the winter, when the leaves have fallen. The shadows will not work the same according to the season. Using the seasonal change to get shadow in the summer, light in the winter, is a general rule for a solar mask.

=== Solar chimney ===
A solar chimney is a chimney of outside black color. They were used in Roman antiquity as a ventilation system. The black surface makes the chimney heat with sunlight. The air inside gets warmer and moves up, pumping the air from the underground, that is at 15 °C (288 K) all the year. This traditional air-ground exchanger was used to make the houses cool in the summer, mild in the winter.

The solar chimney may be coupled with a badgir or a wood chimney for stronger effect.

=== Solar parabola ===
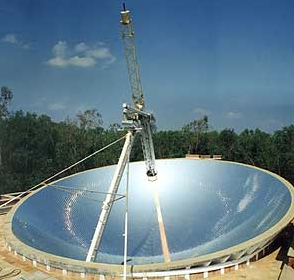
The Auroville's solar parabola

A solar parabola is a parabolic mirror that concentrates the sunlight to reach high temperatures. In Auroville's collective kitchen, a large solar parabola on the roof provides heat for cooking.

The solar parabola can also be used for industrial building. The Odeillo solar furnace, one of the largest solar parabola in the world, concentrates the sunlight 10,000 times and reaches temperatures above 3,200 K. No material resists, even diamond melts. It opens the vision of a futuristic metallurgy, using a clean and renewable source of energy.

== Examples ==
One of the first large commercial buildings to exemplify solar architecture is 4 Times Square in New York City. It has built-in solar panels on the 37th through the 43rd floors, and incorporated more energy-efficient technology than any other skyscraper at the time of its construction. The National Stadium in Kaohsiung, Taiwan, designed by the Japanese architect Toyo Ito, is a dragon-shaped structure that has 8,844 solar panels on its roof. It was built in 2009 to house the 2009 world games. Constructed completely of recycled materials, it is the largest solar-powered stadium in the world and powers the surrounding neighborhood when it is not in use. The Sundial Building in China was built to symbolize the need for replacing fossil fuels with renewable energy sources. The building is shaped like a fan and is covered in 4,600 square metres (50,000 sq ft) of solar panels. It was named the world's largest solar-powered office building in 2009.

Although it is not yet completed, the Solar City Tower in Rio de Janeiro is another example of what solar architecture might look like in the future. It is a power plant that generates energy for the city during the day while also pumping water to the top of the structure. At night, when the sun is not shining, the water will be released to run over turbines that will continue to generate electricity. It was set to be revealed at the 2016 Olympic Games in Rio, although the project is still in the proposal phase.

== Environmental benefits ==
Using solar power in architecture contributes to a world of clean and renewable energy. This is an investment: the initial price is high, but afterwards, there is nearly nothing to pay. On the contrary, fossil and fissile energies are cheap in the beginning, but cost tremendous amounts to humans and nature. The Fukushima catastrophe is evaluated to cost 210 billion dollars to Japan. Global warming has already been a cause of species extinction.

== Criticism ==
According to an article on ECN's website titled "Architects just want to develop attractive buildings", an architect's main purpose is to "create a spatial object with lines, shapes, colours and texture. These are the challenges for the architect within the customer's programme of requirements. But they do not immediately think of using a solar panel as an interesting building material. There is still much to be achieved here." In the article it is stated multiple times that solar panels are not an architect's first choice for building material because of their cost and aesthetics.

Another criticism of installing solar panels is their upfront cost. According to energyinfomative.org, the average cost for a residential solar system is between $15,000 and $40,000 (USD), and about $7 per watt. In the article, it says that at today's rates, it would take 10 years to pay off an average system. As a solar panel may last more than 20 years, in the end, it becomes a benefit.

== See also ==
- Sustainable architecture
- Building-integrated photovoltaics
- Solar thermal collector
- Solar cooker
- Solar chimney
