= Kookal Ramunni Krishnan =

Indian physician

Kookal Ramunni Krishnan (KR Krishnan) (1929–28 December 1999) born in Kerala, was an Indian physician. He was the former director of Southport Regional Spinal Injuries Centre in Southport, United Kingdom, a lecturer in the department of neurological science at University of Liverpool, and visiting professor of rehabilitation at the University of Salford. He is credited with pioneering the spinal injuries service at Southport.

== Early life ==
Krishnan was the son of a High Court judge in Kerala. He received his medical degree MBBS from Chennai in 1951. Later, he also received his FRCS. He first practised medicine in the Indian Army and subsequently trained as a neurosurgeon in England, working for a time with Sir Ludwig Guttmann and developing his interest in spinal cord injury (SCI) during this time.

== Career in Southport ==
Following a brief period in India he was persuaded to return to England in 1971 to take on the vacant post of Consultant in Spinal Injuries in Southport. He developed the service extensively. The development and opening of a purpose-built Spinal Injuries Center in Southport in 1991 was largely a result of his efforts, as was the appointment of the first dedicated clinical psychology service to a spinal injuries unit; case management initiatives to manage the process of care and community reintegration; development of lifelong follow-up programs and management in the community to ensure continued health; the development of purpose-built accommodation in order to enable people to live independently, and funding a chalet so patients and their families might take holidays together in safety and comfort.

== Scholarly work ==
He made many notable contributions to the field of SCI authoring almost 100 peer reviewed publications and numerous book chapters. He co-authored of one of the widely cited clinical algorithm for the urological management of spinal cord damaged patients. He did notable work on long-term impact of patients with spinal cord injury. Krishnan was a key member of a fifty-year investigation examining long-term survival in a population-based sample of spinal cord injury (SCI) survivors in Great Britain, a study that identified risk factors contributing to deaths and explored trends in cause of death over the decades following spinal cord injury. His paper on 20 year outcomes of persons with spinal cord injury is highlighted as one of the most important papers on the clinical practice committee's suggested reading list of the American Association of Spinal Cord Injury Psychologists and Social Workers.

== Patient advocacy ==
Krishnan was also a known as an advocate for patients with Spinal Cord Injury; as a member of the SCI Consensus group, a multinational group of clinicians and researchers, he assessed health-related quality of the life (HRQL) for SCI patients and available instruments for its measurement. He was also the president of the CALIES Network (Computer-Aided Locomotion by Implanted Electro-Stimulation), a pan-European non-profit organization of rehabilitation centers focusing on pioneering mobility using implanted muscle stimulation. At the time of his death, he was writing a book on tetraplegic ventilatory management.
