= Mirza Faizan =

Indian aerospace scientist

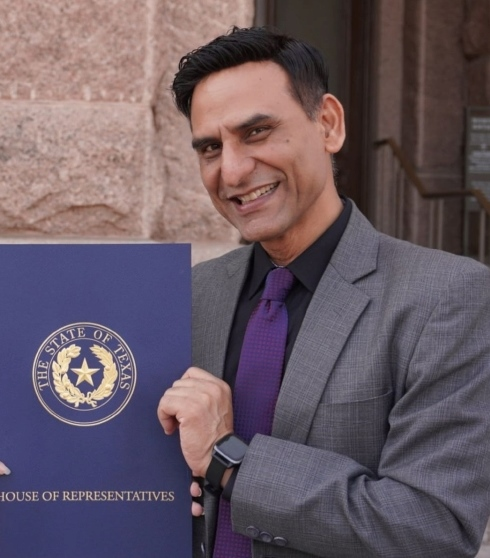
- Photo of Mirza Faizan
- Born: Patna, Bihar, India
- Education: Manipal Institute of Technology; Indian Institute of Science
- Occupations: Aerospace scientist, aviation safety expert

Mirza Faizan is an Indian-American aerospace scientist who developed the Ground Reality Information Processing System (GRIPS).

== Biography ==
Faizan attended St Karen’s School, Patna, and graduated from Patna University, followed by work in master of computer application at Manipal Institute of Technology, and in embedded systems at the Indian Institute of Science, Bangalore.

He then worked for Defence Research and Development Organisation, Satyam Computers, Honeywell, Airbus-France, and on aerospace projects in the US.

Faizan came to the United States in 2013 on a EB-1 visa. Faizan is a member of the American Institute of Aeronautics and Astronautics. He currently lives in Texas, US.

Mirza Faizan is the inventor of the Ground Reality Information Processing System (GRIPS), a runway safety system. GRIPS was nominated for the Jane’s ATC Award 2014 held in Madrid.

== Inventions ==
Mirza Faizan developed Ground Reality Information Processing System (GRIPS). This system prevents runway incursion and identifies foreign objects and debris on runways in real-time at the time of airplane take-off or landing.

NASA scientists evaluated GRIPS and further recommended it to National Air Traffic Services in the UK. The Federal Aviation Administration (FAA), the national aviation authority of the United States of America, also shortlisted GRIPS among the technologies that prevent runway incursions.

GRIPS was nominated for the Jane’s ATC Award 2014 held in Madrid.

== DiscoverSTEM ==
Mirza Faizan is the founder of DiscoverSTEM program. He started the program in 2016. Mirza Faizan resigned as head of engineering services (USA & Canada) in 2019 at Capgemini to focus full-time on developing the DiscoverSTEM program.

In the DiscoverSTEM program, students are encouraged to follow a five-step program of think, analyze, ideate, create and innovate patentable solutions to real-world problems. DiscoverSTEM program is designed to create the next generation of thinkers, innovators, scientists and entrepreneurs. There are two major parts of the course – foundation and implementation.

DiscoverSTEM students have won global innovation competitions. DiscoverSTEM has sent students to Harvard, Stanford, Princeton, and Duke University with scholarships totalling $3.5 million. It has produced almost 200 young inventors ages 10 to 18.

== Patents ==
=== Patents Granted in the United States ===
1. U.S. patent 20210269998A1: Apparatus and method to clean garbage from water bodies
2. U.S. patent 20210269158A1: Automated Aircraft Tray Table Disinfecting System Using Ultra-Violet light
3. U.S. patent 20220034624A1: Relay based system to launch a projectile
4. U.S. patent 20210269997A1: Automated system for cleaning and recovering spilled oil in the ocean using hair felt rollers
5. U.S. patent 20210270240A1: Wind powered system to lift water using multiple tanks
6. U.S. patent 11464462B1: Drug abuse prevention device and a method thereof
7. U.S. patent 11433916B1: System to generate an alert to wake a driver of a vehicle and a method thereof
8. U.S. patent 20230065017A1: Package delivery box
9. U.S. patent 20210086970A1: Biodegradable bottle cap using pestalotiopsis microsporia to biodegrade waste plastic bottle
10. U.S. patent 20230034830A1: Fluid flow control unit
11. U.S. patent 20230048142A1: Wearable device for managing alcohol-driven violence
12. U.S. patent 20220386914A1: System and Method for Mental State Determination
13. U.S. patent 20210270793A1: Handheld device to detect lead compounds and impurities in water
14. U.S. patent 20220388788A1: A high-speed pressure based propulsion system for transporting resources
15. U.S. patent 20230061443A1: Automatic sunvisor assembly
16. U.S. patent 20230066405A1: An apparatus for sanitising products
17. U.S. patent 20220099408A1: Deep sea pressure based projectile launching system
18. U.S. patent 20220389694A1: Smart shower head
19. U.S. patent 20230060737A1: A system for refilling of used markers
20. U.S. patent 20220388736A1: Bio-Degradable Container
21. U.S. patent 20240087440A1: Iot based management system and a method for assisting users around a swimming pool
22. U.S. patent 20230324680A1: Apparatus to enable disabled users to communicate and a method thereof
23. U.S. patent 20240085134A1: Method and system for preventing injury by friendly fire
24. U.S. patent 20240080057A1: Biodegradable cover for a portable electronic device
25. U.S. patent 20240094830A1: Method and system for providing a smart whiteboard cleaner
26. U.S. patent 20240138541A1: Perfume dispersing device
27. U.S. patent 20220390615A1: Aircraft tracking system and method
28. U.S. patent 20230069173A1: Smart rescue system coordinated with an interactive application
29. U.S. patent 20240144357A1: System for displaying selected clothes on a dummy human body
30. U.S. patent 20220387639A1: Self sanitizing door handle with protective cover
31. U.S. patent 20230332468A1: Method and system for providing a smart ladder to a user

=== Patents Granted in South Africa ===
1. South African Patent | 202209145B: Water desalination system
2. South African Patent | 202209147B: Method and apparatus for enabling communication of disabled users
3. South African Patent | 202209146B: Brick for power generation
4. South African Patent | 202209144B: Vehicle collision avoidance system
5. South African Patent | 202209154B: Stress management system
6. South African Patent | 202210453B: Preventing finger of a user from pinch in a door gap
7. South African Patent | 202303467B: Method and system for providing a smart ladder to a user
8. South African Patent | 202303468B: A system for monitoring water consumption of users and a method thereof
9. South African Patent | 202303469B: A system and a method for color-blind person to distinguish colors in a surrounding
10. South African Patent | 202303472B: An IOT-Based management system and a method for assisting users around a swimming pool
11. South African Patent | 202303517B: Method and system for preventing injury by friendly fire
12. South African Patent | 202402960B: Stabilizer system for controlling tipping of furniture

=== Patents pending ===
1. U.S. patent 20210270050A1: A system to prevent injury from stair fall
2. U.S. patent 20220390200A1: Safety system for preventing mass shootings by Smart guns
3. U.S. patent 20220386899A1: Wearable device to identify medical emergencies and notify
4. U.S. patent 20220388809A1: System and method for contactless provisioning of elevator service
5. U.S. patent 20220387647A1: Self-sanitizing Poles
6. U.S. patent 20220392593A1: Medical surgery recording, processing and reporting system
7. U.S. patent 20230061572A1: The automatic system to monitor health condition of an infant
8. U.S. patent 20250057488A1: System and method for alerting users based on brain signals
9. U.S. patent 20250121490A1: Exoskeleton apparatus to assist movement of user using brain signals

== Awards and honors ==
Mirza Faizan is a recipient of George Washington Honor Medal from the Freedoms Foundation.

As a founder of DiscoverSTEM, Mirza Faizan was felicitated in the Texas House of Representatives, which passed an official House Resolution #403, commemorating Mirza Faizan and DiscoverSTEM’s impact on shaping the next generation of innovators & leaders.
