= Subhendu Guha =

Indian scientist and solar cell inventor

- Born: 1942 (age 83–84); Dhaka, British India
- Citizenship: American
- Education: Calcutta University: TIFR, India; University of Sheffield, United Solar, MI, USA
- Occupations: Semiconductor, photovoltaics, solar architecture
- Known for: Invention of high quality amorphous silicon

Subhendu Guha (born 1942 in Dhaka) is an Indian scientist in the field of photovoltaics.

== Early life and career ==
Subhendu Guha was born in 1942 in Dhaka. Subhendu studied at Presidency College, Kolkata, and obtained his M.Tech. and PhD from the University of Calcutta.

Subhendu developed a new process for making Amorphous silicon in 1979 after he joined Tata Institute of Fundamental Research, Mumbai in 1968.

In 1991, he led a team of scientists at United Solar that made innovations to achieve efficiency solar cells and modules using Thin-film solar cell silicon and also the invention of flexible solar roofing shingles.

In 2006, when Subhendu was President of United Solar, he discussed solar technology with President George W. Bush during the president's visit to United Solar. He has also served as a panelist on the US Senate committee on energy and natural resources.

== Awards and recognition ==
Subhendu is a recipient of the Bright Light Award from the US Department of Energy, and the PVSEC 2009 award for outstanding contribution to science and technology of photovoltaic.

He also received the World Technology Award and the Best of the Best Award from ABP Ananda for his contribution to science.

== Selected publications ==
- Backreflector morphology effects and thermodynamic light-trapping in thin-film silicon solar cells.
- High efficiency multi-junction thin film silicon cells incorporating nanocrystalline silicon.
- On light‐induced effect in amorphous hydrogenated silicon
