= K. R. K. Easwaran =

Indian molecular biophysicist (born 1939)

- Born: 7 July 1939 (age 87); Kerala, India
- Education: Government Victoria College, Palakkad; University of Mumbai; Tata Institute of Fundamental Research; University of Washington; International Centre for Theoretical Physics
- Known for: Development of anti-fungal drugs Ion-transport across membranes
- Awards: 1984 Shanti Swarup Bhatnagar Prize; 1994 Ranbaxy Research Award
- Scientific career
- Fields: Molecular biophysics
- Workplaces: Indian Institute of Science; Jožef Stefan Institute; Harvard Medical School; University of Connecticut; Georgetown University; United States Naval Research Laboratory; National University of Singapore; ABL Biotechnologies

Kalpathy Ramaier Katchap Easwaran (born 1939) is an Indian molecular biophysicist, academic and a former Astra Chair Professor and chairman of the department of molecular biophysics of the Indian Institute of Science. He is known for his contributions in the development of anti-fungal drugs and for his researches on ionophores and ion-transport across membranes. He is an elected fellow of the Indian National Science Academy and the Indian Academy of Sciences. The Council of Scientific and Industrial Research, the apex agency of the Government of India for scientific research, awarded him the Shanti Swarup Bhatnagar Prize for Science and Technology, one of the highest Indian science awards, in 1984, for his contributions to biological sciences.

== Biography ==
Kalpathy Easwaran, born on 7 July 1939 in the South Indian state of Kerala in a Brahmin family, graduated in science from Government Victoria College, Palakkad and secured his master's degree (MSc) from the University of Mumbai in 1962 to pursue his doctoral studies at the department of physics of the Indian Institute of Science, which he obtained in 1967. (Note: His doctoral thesis was on nuclear magnetic resonance studies in solids, particularly in ferroelectrics.) His post-doctoral research was at Tata Institute of Fundamental Research during 1966–67 and later at the University of Washington after which he spent a year at Jožef Stefan Institute as a visiting scientist. Returning to India in 1970, he resumed his career at the Indian Institute of Science, holding such positions as Astra Chair professorship (1994–97), chair of the department of molecular biophysics (until 2006) and as Indian National Science Academy Senior Scientist (2006–07) until his superannuation in 2007. In between, he served as a visiting faculty at institutions such as Harvard Medical School, University of Connecticut, Georgetown University, United States Naval Research Laboratory and National University of Singapore. Post retirement, he is involved with ABL Biotechnologies, a Chennai-based biotechnology institution.

Easwaran lives in Bengaluru.

== Legacy ==
Easwaran's studies are known to have contributed to a wider understanding of ion-transport across membranes and assisted in developing a molecular model for transmembrane cation transport. He elucidated the conformational, mechanistic and kinetic aspects of transmembrane ion transport mediated by carrier ionophores, and this helped in the design and development of anti-fungal drugs, lipids and membrane structures. He also contributed in the spectroscopic analysis of peptides and proteins. His researches are documented in over 90 articles and six review papers. He has mentored 14 scholars in their doctoral studies and edited two books, one of which is Biomembrane Structure and Function: The State of the Art.

Easwaran is reported to have been among the scientists of IISc who established the departments of Structural Biology and Molecular Biophysics as centres of excellence. He led a team of scientists working on Nuclear magnetic resonance spectroscopy and membrane biophysics and served as the founder chairman of the International Relations Cell of the institute. He sat in several committees of the Department of Biotechnology, Council of Scientific and Industrial Research, Department of Science and Technology, Indian National Science Academy and the National University of Singapore and is also known to have been active in promoting life science education programs in Bengaluru. He was one of the Indian scientists who successfully campaigned for the XIII International Biophysics Congress held in New Delhi during 19–24 September 1999 and has participated in several conferences and seminars to delivery keynote addresses.

== Awards and honors ==
The Council of Scientific and Industrial Research awarded him the Shanti Swarup Bhatnagar Prize, one of the highest Indian science awards, in 1984. The Indian Academy of Sciences elected him as their fellow in 1984 and the Indian National Science Academy followed suit in 1989. A life member of the Indian Biophysical Society, Easwaran received the Ranbaxy Research Award in 1994.

== See also ==
- M. Vijayan
