= Shobhona Sharma =

Indian molecular parasitologist

- Born: 5 February 1953 (age 73)
- Education: Miranda House, Delhi University
- Known for: Malaria research
- Scientific career
- Fields: Biology
- Workplaces: Tata Institute of Fundamental Research

Shobhona Sharma (born 5 February 1953) is a professor specializing in immunology, molecular biology, and biochemistry at the Tata Institute of Fundamental Research, Mumbai. She is also the chairperson of the Department of Biological Sciences. She is a Fellow of the Indian Academy of Sciences and the Indian National Science Academy.

== Early life ==
Shobhona Sharma (née Banerjee) was born to Bengali parents from Calcutta. She completed her schooling from Lady Irwin School, New Delhi. She did her undergraduate study in chemistry at Miranda House, Delhi, and obtained her master's degree from Delhi University in 1975. She joined the doctoral program at the Tata Institute of Fundamental Research. She chose molecular biology as her specialization. During this time Sharma met a fellow doctoral student majoring in solid-state electronics and they subsequently got married.

== Career ==
After completing her Ph.D., Sharma moved to research topics related to Malaria at New York University Medical Center as a post-doctoral fellow. After a while, as her husband was at a job in the Research Triangle Park in North Carolina, Sharma decided to move, and with the help of her adviser she found a research position at Duke University. After the birth of their daughter, Sharma and her husband moved back to India — she joined TIFR and he joined the Indian Institute of Technology, Bombay. In 2003 Sharma was elected as a Fellow of the Indian Academy of Sciences, and in 2014 she was elected as Fellow, of the Indian National Science Academy.

== Honours and awards ==
- Fellow, Indian Academy of Sciences
- Fellow, Indian National Science Academy
