= Subramania Ranganathan =

Indian bioorganic chemist

- Born: 2 February 1934; Tamil Nadu, India
- Died: 8 January 2016 (aged 81)
- Education: University of Madras; Ohio State University; Harvard University; Woodward Research Institute
- Known for: Studies on synthetic and mechanistic organic chemistry
- Spouse: Darshan Ranganathan
- Awards: 1975 Basudev Banerjee Medal; 1977 Shanti Swarup Bhatnagar Prize; 2000 R. C. Mehrotra Endowment Gold Medal; 2001 CRSI Silver Medal; 2006 CRSI Life-time Achievement Award; 2014 INSA Best Teacher Award
- Scientific career
- Fields: Organic chemistry; Bioorganic chemistry
- Workplaces: Central Leather Research Institute; IIT Kanpur; National Institute for Interdisciplinary Science and Technology; Indian Institute of Chemical Technology
- Doctoral advisor: Harold Shechter; Robert Burns Woodward

Subramania Ranganathan (1934–2016) was an Indian bioorganic chemist and professor and head of the department of chemistry at the Indian Institute of Technology, Kanpur. He was known for his studies on synthetic and mechanistic organic chemistry and was an elected fellow Indian National Science Academy, National Academy of Sciences, India and the Indian Academy of Sciences The Council of Scientific and Industrial Research, the apex agency of the Government of India for scientific research, awarded him the Shanti Swarup Bhatnagar Prize for Science and Technology, one of the highest Indian science awards, in 1977, for his contributions to chemical sciences.

== Biography ==
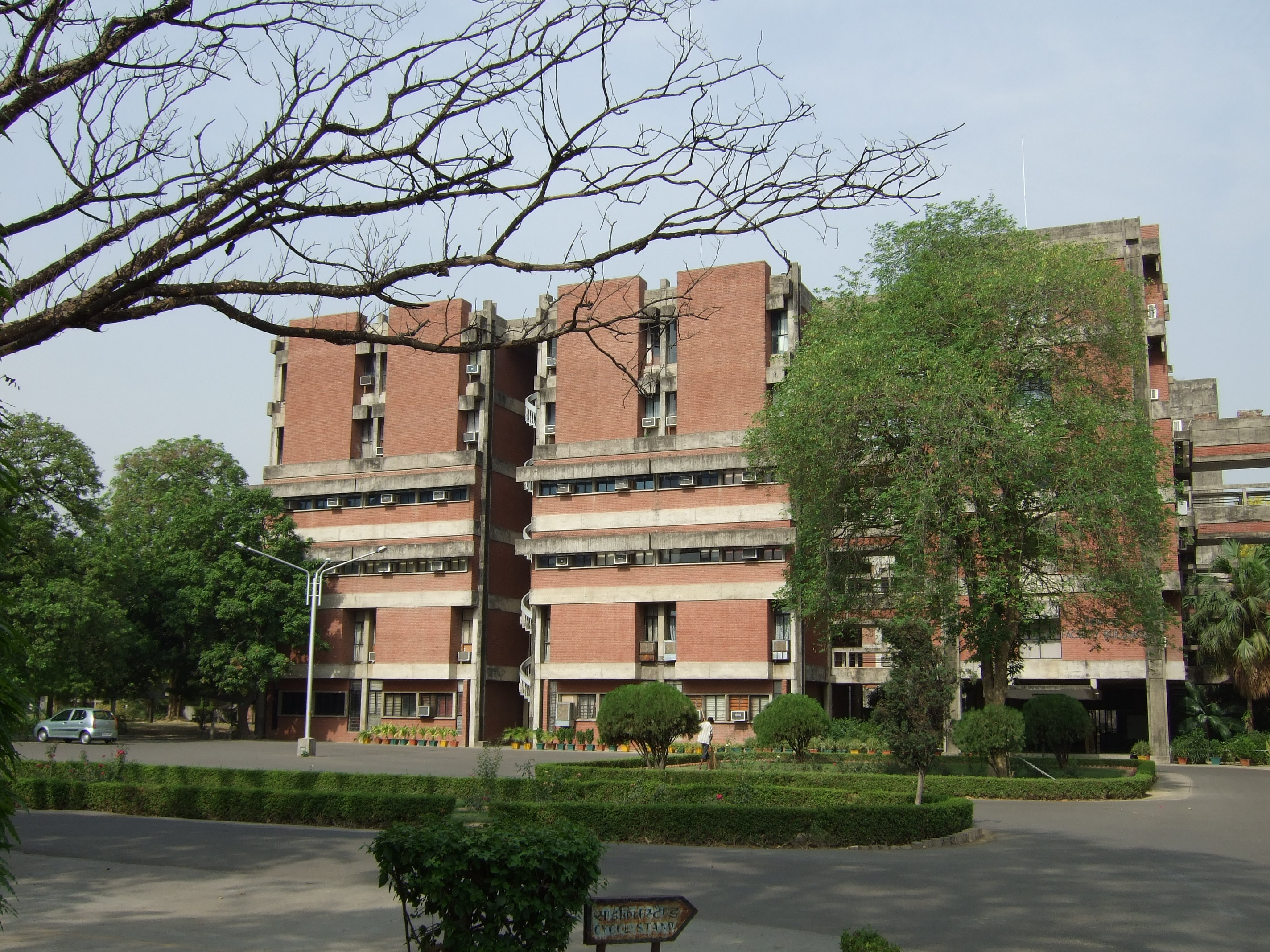
Indian Institute of Technology, Kanpur

Ranganathan, born on 2 February 1934 in the south Indian state of Tamil Nadu, graduated in chemistry from Madras University and continued there to complete his master's degree in 1957. Before moving to US to pursue his doctoral studies on a Sloan Kettering Foundation fellowship, he worked at the biochemistry department of the Central Leather Research Institute for a short while. In the US, he enrolled at Ohio State University at Harold Shechter's laboratory and secured a PhD in 1962. He moved to the laboratory of Robert Burns Woodward, the 1965 Nobel laureate, at Harvard University for his post- doctoral studies and in 1964, he shifted to Woodward Research Institute, Basel to complete the studies in 1964. On his return to India in 1966, he joined IIT Kanpur where he spent his entire official academic career, holding positions of a professor, head of the department and dean, before superannuating in 1994. Post-retirement, he served as an INSA senior scientist, first at National Institute for Interdisciplinary Science and Technology and later at the Indian Institute of Chemical Technology (IICT), both the facilities were earlier known as Regional Research Laboratories.

Ranganathan was holding the position of an honorary position at IICT when he died on 8 January 2016, at the age of 81, survived by his son, Anand. He was married to Darshan Ranganathan, an academic, research associate and his co-author; his wife predeceased him. Anand Ranganathan is a scientist working on drugs for TB and Malaria at International Centre for Genetic Engineering and Biotechnology.

== Legacy ==
During his post-doctoral days, Ranganathan worked closely with Woodward and was known to have assisted the latter in his work on Woodward–Hoffmann rules. It was during this time, he accomplished the total synthesis of Cephalosporin C and Woodward's Nobel lecture was based on this synthesis. Later, basing his researches on synthetic and mechanistic organic chemistry, he identified new methodologies for the synthesis of prostaglandins, a group of biologically active compounds. His researches have been documented by way of a number of books and over 200 peer-reviewed articles; the online repository of Indian Academy of Sciences has listed 97 of them; and many authors have cited his researches in their publications.

== Awards and honors ==
Ranganathan received the Basudev Banerjee Medal in 1975 and the Council of Scientific and Industrial Research awarded him the Shanti Swarup Bhatnagar Prize, one of the highest Indian science awards, in 1977. He received R. C. Mehrotra Endowment Gold Medal in 2000 and the Silver Medal of the Chemical Research Society of India in 2001; CRSI would honor him again in 2006 with the Lifetime Achievement Award. In 2014, he was awarded the Best Teacher Award by the Indian National Science Academy. He held lectureships of the University Grants Commission of India (1979–80), Science and Engineering Research Board (1991) and Department of Atomic Energy (2001) and delivered several award orations including Professor K. Venkatraman Lecture (1979), Professor A. B. Kulkarni Lecture (1982); Professor N. V. Subba Rao Memorial Lecture (1985), Professor T. R. Seshadri Memorial Lecturer (1993) and Maitreyi Memorial Lecture (1994). The Indian Academy of Sciences elected him as a fellow in 1975 and he became an elected fellow of and the Indian National Science Academy and the National Academy of Sciences, India in 1981 and 1991 respectively.

== Books ==
- Subramania Ranganathan (1967). Fascinating Problems in Organic Reaction Mechanisms. Holden-Day.
- Subramania Ranganathan (1967). Propagation of density fluctuations in dense monatomic fluids. Cornell University, June.
- Darshan Ranganathan; Subramania Ranganathan (1975). The Appreciation of Molecular Transformations in Organic Chemistry: An Introduction. Macmillan Company of India. ISBN 9780333901281.
- Subramania Ranganathan (1 January 2002). Patterns for Supramolecular Design. New Age International. ISBN 978-81-224-1405-9.
- Subramania Ranganathan. Art in Biosynthesis. Acad. Press.
- Darshan Ranganathan; Subramania Ranganathan (1972). Challenging problems in organic reaction mechanisms. Academic Press. ISBN 9780125800501.
