= K. Sridhar =

Indian scientist

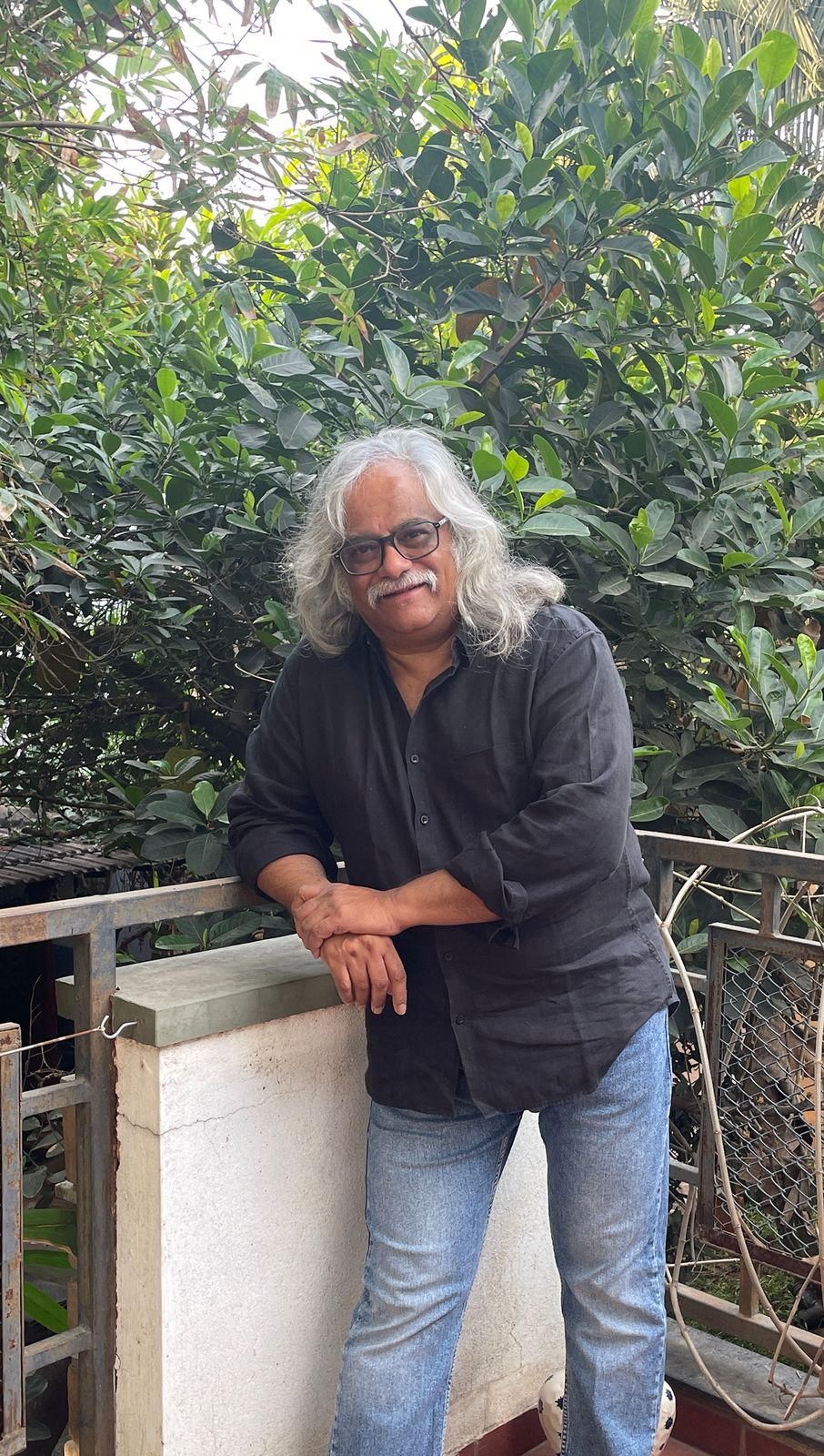
- Born: 27 May 1961 (age 65); India
- Known for: Ajita; Twice Written; Particle Physics of Brane Worlds and Extra Dimensions

K. Sridhar (born 27 May 1961) is an Indian scientist conducting research in the area of theoretical high energy physics and a writer of fiction.

== Career ==
K. Sridhar obtained a PhD in physics in 1990 from Mumbai University. After his doctoral studies he worked in the University of London and CERN, Geneva. He has collaborative associations with CERN, Geneva; LAPP, Annency; DAMTP, Cambridge and University of Orsay, Paris. He was a professor of Theoretical Physics at the Tata Institute of Fundamental Research, Mumbai till May, 2021 and is now a faculty member at the Azim Premji University, Bengaluru.

== Research ==
His current interest is primarily in theories of extra dimensions and compositeness, but he has also made contributions to quantum chromodynamics, supersymmetry, grand unification and electroweak physics. He has made significant contributions to brane-world models of extra dimensions, quarkonium physics and R-parity violating supersymmetry. He has published a book, Particle Physics of Brane Worlds and Extra Dimensions, which is published by Cambridge University Press in the series Cambridge Monographs on Mathematical Physics.

== Literature ==
Sridhar's debut novel, Twice Written was published by Popular Prakashan, Mumbai in 2011. This novel addresses important existential and philosophical questions through the lives of three young people living in Bombay in the 80's. Twice Written was reviewed in The Hindu and the Deccan Herald.

A critical edition of Twice Written was published in 2019 by Curato, Mumbai.

Sridhar's second novel, Ajita, was published in January 2025 by Westland Books. Ajita is a fictionalised account of the life of the Carvaka philosopher, Ajita Kesakambali, presented in the novel as a story written by a contemporary professor of Philosophy called Moksh Malhar. Ajita presents Ajita's story alongside Moksh's own till the stories get intertwined and the book loops back upon itself. The form of the novel also mirrors its central concern with missing elements. The book is a lipogram in twenty-six chapters leaving out, in each chapter, one letter of the alphabet altogether.
