= Anang Tadar =

Indian Researcher

- Born: Papum Pare, Arunachal Pradesh, India
- Known for: G4B goggles for blinds
- Parent(s): Tadar Togung (Father); Tadar Roi (Mother)
- Awards: National Grassroot Innovator Award; 3rd BRICS Young Scientist Award; APJ Abdul Kalan Ignite Award

Anang Tadar is an Indian inventor and researcher born in Papum Pare, Arunachal Pradesh, India. He is best known for developing a device called G4B (goggle for blind), which uses the principle of echolocation used by the bats to help the visually impaired people to navigate around with ease.

== Early life and education ==
Anang was born in a farmer family to Tadar Togung and Tadar Roi at rayo, Nirjuli village of Papun Pare, Arunachal Pradesh.

== Accolades ==
Tadar was awarded with "National Grassroot Innovator Award" by the President of India, APJ Abdul Kalam Ignite award 2017 and most promising young innovator award at 3rd BRICS Young Scientist Conclave in Durban, South Africa. Additionally, he has received several other notable national and international awards.
