= Vidya Arankalle =

Indian virologist

Vidya Avinash Arankalle (born 1952) is an Indian virologist whose work is multidisciplinary, incorporating aspects of cell culture and microbiology.

== Life ==
She is a fellow of the Indian National Science Academy, and the Indian Academy of Sciences.

== Selected works ==
- Avinash, Arankalle Vidya; Prabhakar, Shrotri Sandhya; Madhukar, Walimbe Atul; Dattatraya, Pawar Shailesh; Chandra, Mishra Akhilesh (2005). "G, N, and P Gene-based Analysis of Chandipura Viruses, India". Emerging Infectious Diseases. 11 (1): 123–126. doi:10.3201/eid1101.040602. ISSN 1080-6040. PMC 3294343. PMID 15705335.
- Arankalle, V. A.; Ramakrishnan, J. (2009). "Simian hepatitis A virus derived from a captive rhesus monkey in India is similar to the strain isolated from wild African green monkeys in Kenya". Journal of Viral Hepatitis. 16 (3): 214–218. doi:10.1111/j.1365-2893.2008.01060.x. ISSN 1352-0504.
