= Praveen Kumar Gorakavi =

Indian scientist, chemist and inventor

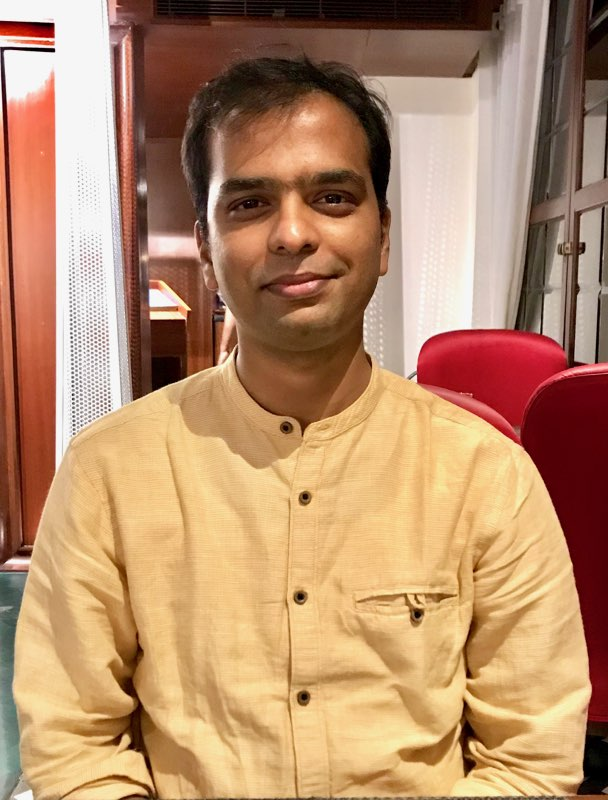
- Praveen Kumar Gorakavi
- Born: 24 May 1989 (age 37); Hyderabad, India
- Education: Osmania University
- Known for: Multidisciplinary research
- Awards: National Bal Shree Honour; Forbes 30 Under 30 Honouree; FAPCCI Award; Ugadi Gavrav Puraskar; National Science Medal; Best Technologist for Disabled Empowerment; Recognition Award : Scientific Research; Appreciation Award : Design
- Scientific career
- Fields: Chemistry, Chemical Engineering, Optical engineering, Mathematics, Physics.
- Workplaces: The Phi Factory; Indian Institute of Chemical Technology; Osmania University
- Website: The Official Website of Gorakavi

Praveen Kumar Gorakavi (born 24 May 1989) is an Indian scientist, chemical engineer, inventor and consultant, recognised as a polymath and former child prodigy for his works in science and engineering from childhood.

Praveen Kumar Gorakavi has co-founded The Phi Factory, a socially conscious R&I initiative that develops one social innovation for every three commercial technologies it develops.

== Early life and education ==
Gorakavi studied chemical engineering at the Osmania University and later dropped out of the Ph.D. programme from the Indian Institute of Chemical Technology to pursue innovation at The Phi Factory.

== Career ==
Gorakavi's innovations span multiple scientific fields. He has developed a low-cost artificial limb, products for water purification, food storage, and biofuel synthesis.

=== Notable works ===
At 13 years of age, Praveen devised a calendar for 20,000 years (from 10,000 BC to 10,000 AD). He identified some 27 mathematical equations on which an ideal calendar should be based. Later, he extended this calendar to 40,000 years and even rendered it into the Braille script. He designed a low-cost artificial leg with knee and ankle movement. He has also designed a low-cost mechanical brailler to increase braille literacy in the developing world.

In another instance, he developed a pen that could produce as many as 256 colours. This same concept could be used for nail paint, face foundation and other cosmetics. He also worked on fragrance encapsulation technology for sanitary pads, baby diapers and detergent powder. He also developed a holographic ink that makes segregation of packaging materials easy and enhances the productivity more than 2.5 times. The other product from Gorakavi's stable includes wrinkle free composite suit fabric that finds a use apparels segment. Then there is 'dosa' premix formulation in a can. The other technologies include a water purification device, orthopaedic catheter for spinal restoration and liquid jetting mechanism for electric tooth brush among others.

Praveen Kumar Gorakavi, who started off as a child prodigy and went on to commercialise 28 technologies in partnership with various companies including Fortune 500 companies, government agencies and scientific institutions.

=== Recognition ===
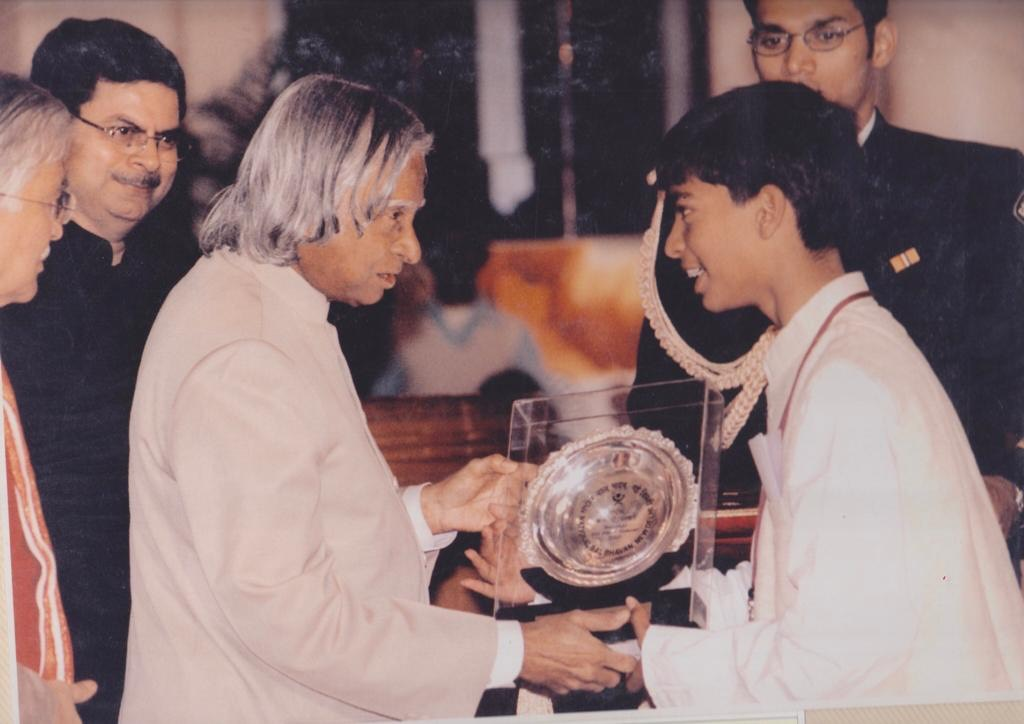
Praveen Gorakavi Receiving Balshree From Indian President A. P. J. Abdul Kalam

Gorakavi was named Outstanding Engineer/Scientist for 2009-10 by FAPCCI and is considered to be the youngest recipient of this award. Prior to this he had been awarded the Balshree by the Government of India and the state of Andhra Pradesh had conferred its Ugadi Gaurav Puraskar award. He has also been named the "Best technologist – for disabled people empowerment" by Andhra Pradesh.

Gorakavi was included in the Forbes Asia 30 Under 30 list for 2019, in healthcare and science category.

Gorakavi worked on hybrid solar energy encapsulation technology, involving solar spectrum bifurcation and subsequent concentration, as a part of doctoral studies at Indian Institute of Chemical Technology in Hyderabad, India.

=== The Phi Factory ===
Gorakavi co-founded The Phi Factory, a socially conscious R&I initiative that develops one social innovation for every three commercial technologies it develops. Gorakavi developed G-FP, a paper additive chemical technology with which paper-makers turn the paper lighter by 21 per cent and at a 9% reduced cost. The Phi Factory is also coming up with bio-plastic materials.
