= Gandikota V. Rao =

Indian-American atmospheric scientist

G.V. Rao
- Born: 15 July 1934; Vizianagaram, India
- Died: 31 July 2004 (aged 70); Mexico
- Citizenship: India; United States (1970)
- Education: University of Chicago (Ph.D., 1965)
- Known for: Tropical meteorology
- Scientific career
- Fields: Atmospheric sciences
- Workplaces: Saint Louis University
- Thesis: On the Influence of Field of Motion, Baroclinicity and Heat Sources on Frontogenesis (1965)

Gandikota V. Rao (15 July 1934 in Vizianagaram, India – 31 July 2004 in Mexico) was an Indian-American atmospheric scientist who chaired the Department of Earth and Atmospheric Sciences at Saint Louis University (SLU). He was a world-renowned expert on tropical meteorology, monsoon, tropical cyclones, and tropical cyclone tornadoes. He was also known for work on air pollution, atmospheric convection, atmospheric boundary layers, and numerical weather prediction.

Rao earned a Ph.D. at the University of Chicago in 1965, studying frontogenesis and continued researching frontogenesis, frontal circulations in the boundary layer, vertical circulations associated with oceanic fronts, and structural features of lake-induced winter disturbances in post-doctoral studies. He joined the faculty of SLU in 1971. He was lead editor of the monograph, Air Quality, in 2003. He participated in several field research programs in tropical and subtropical areas of the Indian Ocean and Arabian Sea, particularly India and Kenya, as well as in other areas such as Mexico. He co-founded the Tropical Cyclone Tornado Research Group, in which SLU collaborated with the Storm Prediction Center (SPC), most notably, tropical cyclone tornado forecaster Roger Edwards, and the Melbourne NWS Forecast Office. Rao died while in Mexico doing field research.
