= Surendra Nath Pandeya =

Indian chemist

S.N. Pandeya
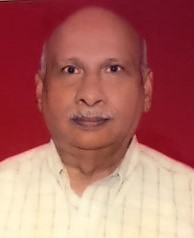
- Born: 1939
- Education: Banaras Hindu University
- Scientific career
- Fields: Chemistry
- Workplaces: Indian Institute of Technology (BHU), Varanasi
- Doctoral advisor: R.H. Sahasrabudhe

Professor Surendra Nath Pandeya (1939–2012) was an Indian medicinal and organic chemist. He made several contributions in the design and discovery of anticonvulsant, antitubercular, anti-HIV, anti-cancer, antibacterial, and antimicrobial molecules. His research focused on semicarbazones, Mannich bases, thiadiazoles, benzothiazoles, and oxindole compounds.

== Early life and education ==
Dr. S.N. Pandeya was born in Ballia, India, to Kapil Deo Pandey and Gangajali Devi Pandey. He pursued his higher education at Banaras Hindu University, where he obtained both his B.Sc. and M.Sc. degrees in 1954. His academic career began with a two-year tenure as a lecturer at the University of Kharagpur. He later returned to Banaras Hindu University to further his studies, earning a Ph.D. in organic chemistry in 1965 under the mentorship of Professor R.H. Sahasrabudhe.

== Scientific research ==
Over his research career, Pandeya worked at and visited several institutions, including the UIC College of Pharmacy (1967 – 1968), the University of Georgia (1968 – 1969) and the University of Saskatchewan as a Canadian Commonwealth emeritus fellow (1992 – 1993). He established several international collaborative efforts with organizations such as the National Cancer Research Institute, National Institute of Neurological Disorders and Stroke and Katholieke Universiteit Leuven with world Professor Erik De Clercq.

Pandeya published over 275 research articles in peer-reviewed journals. He wrote 18 books in the areas of medicinal and organic chemistry. His supervision led to the awarding of 22 Ph.D. and 75 M.Pharm. degrees.
