= Darshan Ranganathan =

Indian chemist

- Born: 4 June 1941
- Died: 4 June 2001 (aged 60)
- Education: Delhi University
- Known for: ATP-imidazole cycle, urea cycle, designing protein tertiary structure
- Spouse: Subramania Ranganathan
- Children: Anand Ranganathan
- Awards: Fellow of the Indian Academy of Sciences; TWAS Prize in Chemistry, 1999; Senior Research Scholarship of the Royal Commission for the Exhibition of 1851, A.V. Rama Rao Foundation Award, Jawaharlal Nehru Birth Centenary Visiting Fellowship, and Sukh Dev Endowment Lectureship.
- Scientific career
- Fields: Organic chemistry
- Workplaces: IIT Kanpur
- Thesis: (1967)
- Doctoral advisor: T.R. Sheshadri

Darshan Ranganathan (4 June 1941 – 4 June 2001) was an organic chemist from India who was known for her work in bio-organic chemistry, including "pioneering work in protein folding." She was also recognized for her work in "supramolecular assemblies, molecular design, chemical simulation of key biological processes, synthesis of functional hybrid peptides and synthesis of nanotubes."

== Early life ==
Darshan Ranganathan was born as Darshan Markan on 4 June 1941 to Vidyavati Markan and Shanti Swarup in Delhi. She was educated in Delhi and received a Ph.D. in chemistry from Delhi University in 1967. First hired as a lecturer, she became head of the Chemistry Department at Miranda College, Delhi, and went on to receive an 1851 Research Fellowship from the Royal Commission for the Exhibition of 1851, to enable her to conduct postdoctoral work at Imperial College London with Professor D.H.R. Barton.

== Career ==
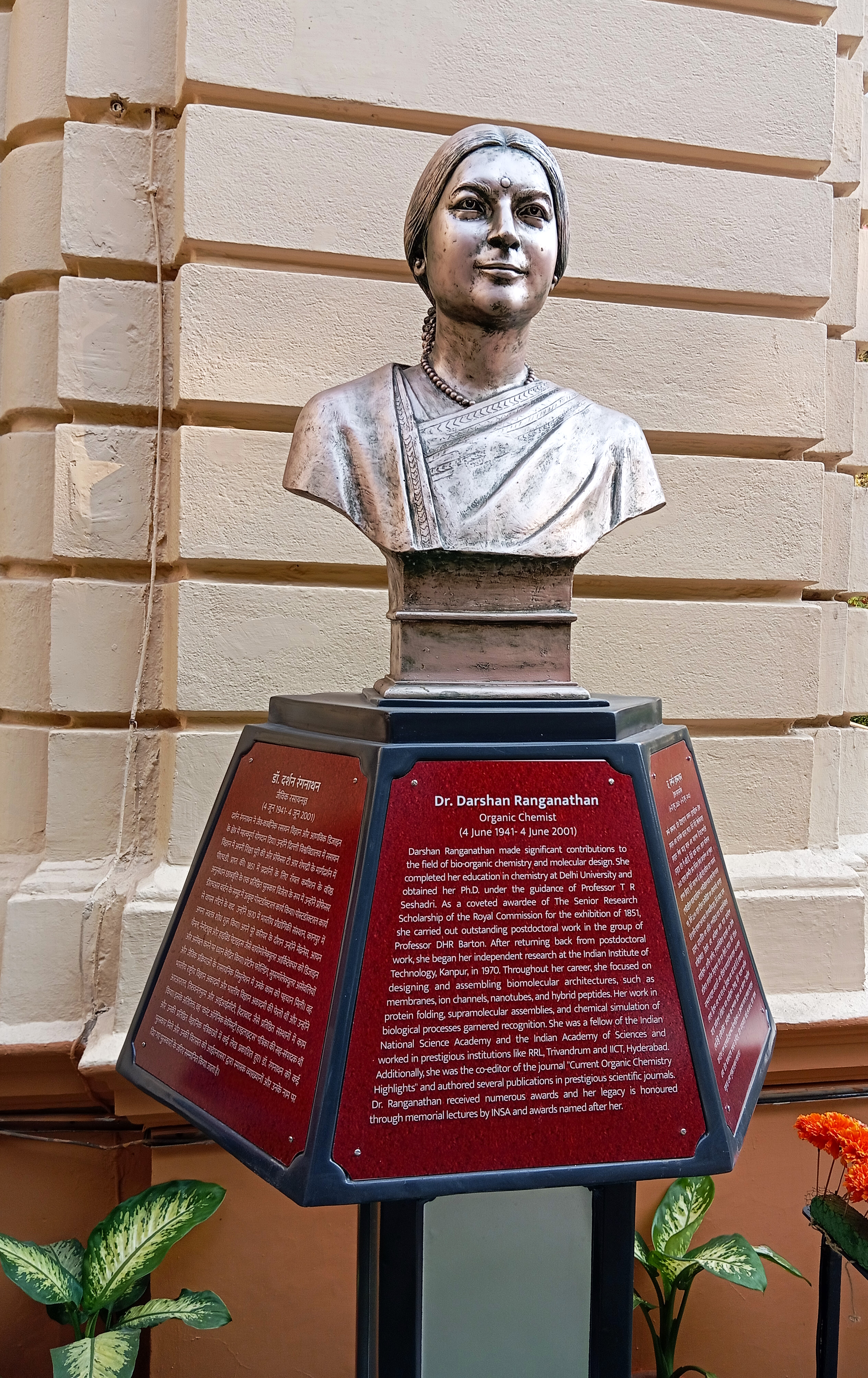
Statue of Darshan Ranganathan, Birla Industrial & Technological Museum, Kolkata, West Bengal, India

In 1970, she began research at the Indian Institute of Technology, Kanpur (IIT Kanpur). In that year, she married Subramania Ranganathan, with whom she would go on to author Challenging problems in organic reaction mechanisms (1972), Art in biosynthesis: the synthetic chemist's challenge (1976), and Further challenging problems in organic reaction mechanisms (1980)—as well as editing an ongoing series titled "Current Organic Chemistry Highlights".

She continued her research at IIT Kanpur on the basis of fellowships. Unwritten rules prevented her from joining the faculty because her husband was already a member.

She began work at Regional Research Laboratory, Trivandrum in 1993, and at IICT, Hyderabad in 1998., where she became Deputy Director. During these years, she conducted ongoing collaborations with Isabella Karle at the U.S. Naval Research Laboratory.

Darshan Ranganathan was diagnosed with breast cancer in 1997, and died on her 60th birthday, in 2001.

The biennial "Professor Darshan Ranganathan Memorial Lecture", which is to be "delivered by a woman scientist who has made outstanding contributions in any field of Science and Technology" was established in her memory by her husband, in 2001.

== Notable accomplishments ==
She was a Fellow of the National Academy of Sciences. She also won the A.V. Rama Rao Foundation Award, the Jawaharlal Nehru Birth Centenary Visiting Fellowship, Third World Academy of Sciences Award in Chemistry in 1999 for her work in bio-organic chemistry, and the Sukh Dev Endowment Lectureship.

At the time of her death, she was the most prolific organic chemist in India, having, in the last five years, a dozen publications in The Journal of the American Chemical Society, six in the Journal of Organic Chemistry and dozens in others. Her monumental contribution to the Accounts of Chemical Research was published, as well as many other papers, posthumously. She was elected Fellow of the Indian Academy of Sciences, Indian National Science Academy and the recipient of many honors the last of which was The Third World Academy of Sciences Award in chemistry for her outstanding contributions to bio-organic chemistry, particularly supramolecular assemblies, molecular design, chemical simulation of key biological processes, synthesis of functional hybrid peptides and synthesis of nanotubes, in 1999.

== Work ==
Ranganathan's special passion was reproducing natural biochemical processes in the laboratory. She created a protocol which achieved the autonomous reproduction of imidazole, an ingredient of histadine and histamine with pharmaceutical importance. She also developed a working simulation of the urea cycle. As her career developed, she became a specialist in designing proteins to hold a wide variety of different conformations and designing nanostructures using self-assembling peptides.
