= Sivaram Murthy =

Indian engineer

Sivaram Murthy from the Indian Institute of Technology- Madras, Chennai, Tamil Nadu, India was named Fellow of the Institute of Electrical and Electronics Engineers (IEEE) in 2012 for contributions to resource management in high performance real-time computing and communication systems.
