= Rashna Bhandari =

Indian scientist

- Education: Indian Institute of Science, Johns Hopkins School of Medicine, Rockefeller University, University of California, Berkeley
- Known for: Biological Sciences, Eukaryotic signal transduction
- Scientific career
- Workplaces: Centre for DNA Fingerprinting and Diagnostics

Rashna Bhandari is head, Laboratory of Cell Signalling at the Centre for DNA Fingerprinting and Diagnostics, Hyderabad. Bhandari is pursuing her study on signal transduction in biological systems, with particular emphasis on understanding the role of inositol pyrophosphates in physiology and metabolism.

== Education ==
Bhandari obtained her bachelor's degree in human biology from the All India Institute of Medical Sciences, followed by post graduation and doctorate in biological sciences from the Indian Institute of Science.

== Career ==
Bhandari joined Centre for DNA Fingerprinting and Diagnostics in 2008 as a staff scientist.

Post her doctorate at Indian Institute of Science, Bhandari worked with Sandhya Srikant Visweswariah on signal transduction by the membrane-bound guanylyl cyclase, GCC, which is involved in maintaining fluid and ion homeostasis across the intestinal membrane.

In 2001, Bhandari joined John Kuriyan laboratory at the University of California, Berkeley as a post-doctoral fellow to work on the structural biology and biochemistry of proteins involved in cell signaling. In 2003, Bhandari relocated to the Johns Hopkins School of Medicine in Baltimore, where she worked with Solomon Snyder on deciphering the role of inositol pyrophosphates as signalling molecules.

In 2015, a group led by Bhandari found that mice with lower levels of IP7 show reduced blood clotting. Inadequate levels of IP7 led to reduction in another phosphate-rich molecule called polyphosphate (a long chain of phosphate groups linked to each other). In mammals, polyphosphate is predominantly found in platelets and helps in strengthening blood clots during their formation. Polyphosphates housed inside platelets break up during clotting. These polyphosphates and other components get released to form a mesh that constitutes the basic structure for clot. Lowering IP7 levels could have potential applications in the prevention of stroke or myocardial infarction by reducing clotting.

Bhandari believes that ambition leads to success and not gender.

== Publications ==
- Saiardi, A.; Bhandari, R; Resnick, A. C.; Snowman, A. M.; Snyder, S. H. (2004). "Phosphorylation of Proteins by Inositol Pyrophosphates". Science. 306 (5704): 2101–5. Bibcode:2004Sci...306.2101S. doi:10.1126/science.1103344. PMID 15604408. S2CID 28745522.
- Bhandari, R.; Saiardi, A.; Ahmadibeni, Y.; Snowman, A. M.; Resnick, A. C.; Kristiansen, T. Z.; Molina, H.; Pandey, A.; Werner, J. K.; Juluri, K. R.; Xu, Y.; Prestwich, G. D.; Parang, K.; Snyder, S. H. (2007). "Protein pyrophosphorylation by inositol pyrophosphates is a posttranslational event". Proceedings of the National Academy of Sciences. 104 (39): 15305–15310. Bibcode:2007PNAS..10415305B. doi:10.1073/pnas.0707338104. PMC 2000531. PMID 17873058.
- Cochran, Jennifer R.; Kim, Yong-Sung; Olsen, Mark J.; Bhandari, Rashna; Wittrup, K.Dane (2004). "Domain-level antibody epitope mapping through yeast surface display of epidermal growth factor receptor fragments". Journal of Immunological Methods. 287 (1–2): 147–58. doi:10.1016/j.jim.2004.01.024. PMID 15099763.
- Chen, X.; Bhandari, R; Vinkemeier, U; Van Den Akker, F; Darnell Jr, J. E.; Kuriyan, J (2003). "A reinterpretation of the dimerization interface of the N-terminal Domains of STATs". Protein Science. 12 (2): 361–5. doi:10.1110/ps.0218903. PMC 2312425. PMID 12538899.
