= Rama Shankar Singh (geneticist) =

Indian-Canadian geneticist and evolutionary biologist

Rama Shankar Singh (born March 2, 1945) is an evolutionary biologist and geneticist, and Professor Emeritus at McMaster University. He received his early education in India, his master’s (1967) from Government Agriculture College, Kanpur (India), and his PhD from the University of California Davis (1972). He joined McMaster University as an assistant professor in 1975 and retired as a professor in 2023. He served as President of the Genetics Society of Canada (2005-07).

He advanced mate choice theory and proposed that menopause is the result of sexual selection involving men’s preference for younger women leading to accumulation of deleterious fertility mutations in older women and giving rise to menopause. He has explained that the problem of precision medicine for complex diseases and cancer lies in molecular complexity and redundancy of the cellular pathways.

== Education ==
Singh was born and raised in a small rural village in India. He earned a Bachelor of Science degree in Agricultural Sciences in 1965 from Agra University (now Dr. Bhimrao Ambedkar University) and a Master of Science in Genetics and Plant Breeding in 1967 from Kanpur University (now Chhatrapati Shahu Ji Maharaj University). He subsequently moved to the United States, where he earned a Ph.D. in Genetics with specialization in population genetics from the University of California, Davis in 1972.

Singh joined the University of Chicago as a post-doctoral fellow under the guidance of Richard Lewontin and later continued as a research associate at Harvard University from 1974 to 1975. In 1975, he joined the Department of Biology at McMaster University as an Assistant Professor, becoming Associate Professor in 1982 and full Professor in 1986. He is presently a Professor Emeritus.

== Contribution to science ==
Singh’s research focused on molecular evolution, population genetics, and evolutionary biology. During his post-doctoral years with Richard Lewontin he refined and used electrophoresis to detect hidden variation in natural populations. He contributed to the molecular basis of speciation, showing sex and reproduction related genes play important roles in speciation and evolve faster than other types of genes. His lab showed sex genes evolve faster than non-sex genes, X-linked genes evolve faster than Autosomal genes, and male-biased genes evolve faster than female-biased genes, giving rise to the theory of male driven evolution.

Singh proposed a Law of Complementarity between complexity and redundancy that describes an increasing level of flexibility across different levels of cellular organization. The proposed law can explain Kant’s biological teleology and provide a basis for the unification of mechanistic and finalistic biology. The law addresses why redundancy is a problem for precision medicine and why certain ailments are more common in men than in women.

Singh developed theory regarding mate choice and showed that human menopause was the result of the human mating system where males prefer younger females, resulting in the accumulation of deleterious mutations affecting female fertility and giving rise to menopause. He further proposed that menopause is still evolving and, with selection for delayed reproduction, it may get delayed or even disappear altogether.

Singh also performed research that showed the developmental basis of the complexity and symmetry of the peacock’s long tail and proposed a solution to why females choose, a problem posed by Darwin’s sexual selection theory. He proposed that female choice is adaptive and females choose males on the basis of size and vigor in addition to ornamentation.

Singh has co-edited three festschrift volumes, with contributions from over 125 scholars, in honor of Richard Lewontin, published by Cambridge University Press. The festschrift books, Evolutionary Genetics: From Molecules to Morphology (Cambridge University Press, 2000), Thinking About Evolution: Historical, Philosophical and Political Perspectives (Cambridge University Press, 2001), The Evolution of Population Biology (Cambridge University Press, 2004), review population genetics, population biology, and history of biology. These books have been highly praised.

Singh has also published over 150 peer-reviewed scientific articles, and numerous general articles, opinion pieces, and news articles. He has also authored the books Rapidly Evolving Genes and Genetic Systems (Oxford University Press, 2012), Towards Universal Values for World Peace (Shubhi Publications, 2024) and The Paradox of Biology: Complexity, Redundancy and the Evolution of Health and Human Freedom (Springer Nature, forthcoming 2026).

== Community contributions ==
Singh led the foundation of the Annual Mahatma Gandhi Lectureship. The lectureship is funded by small contributions from the Indo-Canadian Community and is named after Mahatma Gandhi to honour his practice of nonviolence. The lectureship brings academics and peace and human rights activists to deliver lectures on topics of local, national, or international importance at McMaster University and share them with the community.

Singh also founded the Annual Mahatma Gandhi Peace Festival in the city of Hamilton. The festival has been held annually since 1993 and is linked with the Gandhi Lectureship.

As a result of collaboration between McMaster University and Acharya Ramamurti, Director of the Indian organization Shrambharati (NGO, Patna, Bihar), Singh organized a conference in Vaishal (Bihar) and co-founded Mahila Shanti Sena, a women’s peace and development organization in India (2002). With funding from CIDA and AUCC, he was able to take many student interns from McMaster University to India to work with Mahila Shanti Sena women between 2004 and 2009

== Awards and honors ==
Singh has received numerous honors including election as Fellow of the American Association for the Advancement of Science (2005), Presidency of the Genetics Society of Canada (2005–2007), William F. Grant and Peter B. Moens Award of Excellence (Genetics Society of Canada 2010), World Citizenship Award of the city of Hamilton (2010), YMCA Canada Peace Medal (2001)
