= Suryadeva Yajvan =

Sanskrit-language writer on astronomy

Suryadeva (1191 – at least 1248 CE) was a Sanskrit-language writer on astrology and astronomy (jyotisha)) from the Chola kingdom of southern India. He wrote commentaries on several notable works including the Aryabhatiya and the Laghu-manasa.

== Biography ==
Suryadeva was a Brahmana of the Nidhruva gotra, associated with the Bodhayana Sutra, claiming descent (pravaras) from the sages Kashyapa, Avatsara, and Naidhruva. His works use different suffixes for his name, including Sūri, Yajvā, Yajvān, Somasut, and Dīkṣita. Sūri refers to his scholarship; the other suffixes suggest that he had performed the Soma-yajna ritual sacrifice.

According to his commentary on Laghumanasa, Suryadeva was born in 1191 CE (Monday, 3rd day of the dark half of the Magha month of the Shaka year 1113). He lived in the Chola kingdom, and resided in a town that different manuscripts variously call Gangapuram, Gangapuri, and Shri-ranga-gangapuri; this town can be identified as Gangaikonda Cholapuram.

Suryadeva does not name his parents, but suggests that he was a student or a protégé of his maternal uncle – also named Suryadeva.

Suryadeva appears to have read a large number of previous works, as he refers to earlier scholars such as Lagadhacharya, Vrddha Garga, Parashara, Aryabhata I, Haradatta (Haridatta), Latadeva, Varahamihira, Bhaskara I (whom he calls "Bhaskaracharya"), Brahmagupta, Lalla, Prthusvamin (Prthudaka Svami), Prashastidhara (Whom he calls "Prasastadhara"), Bhattotpala, and Shripati. Besides the works of these authors, Suryadeva also cites and quotes various Vedic, religious, and philosophical works. Later writer Yallaya (c. 1480), in his commentary on the Surya Siddhanta, praises Suryadeva as an "all-knowing astronomer".

In his commentary on the Laghumanasa, he states the planetary positions for a particular day in 1248 CE (Shaka year 1170), which suggests that he wrote the commentary at the age of 57, in 1248.

== Works ==
Suryadeva wrote at least five commentaries, in the following order:

- An exposition of on Govinda-svami's bhashya on Bhaskara's Maha-bhaskariya (629 CE)
- Commentary on Aryabhata's Aryabhatiya
  - This commentary is known by various titles including Aryabhata-prakasha, Bhata-prakasha, Prakasha, Aryabhata-prakashika, Bhata-prakashika, and Prakashika.
  - Yallaya added further notes to this text, and Parameshvara (c. 1431) used it as a source for writing a new commentary on Aryabhatiya.
- Commentary on Varahamihira's Maha-yatra.
- Commentary on Manjula's Laghu-manasa (1248 CE)
  - This commentary is known by the names Manasa-vyakhyana and Manasa-vyakhya-vasana
  - It includes an introduction to Hindu astronomy, an explanation of Manjula's text, and the rationale of the various rules
- Commentary on Shripati's Jataka-paddhati

In his commentary on the Laghumanasa, Suryadeva quotes from his own work Asmadīya-grantha.

== Bibliography ==
- K.S. Shukla; K.V. Sarma, eds. (1976). Āryabhaṭīya of Āryabhaṭa with the commentary of Sūryadeva Yajvan. Vol. 3. Indian National Science Academy. OCLC 214225031.
- K.S. Shukla (1990). "Supplement: A critical study of the Laghumānasa of Mañjula". Indian Journal of History of Science. 25 (1–4). Indian National Science Academy. OCLC 24307203.
