= List of University of Madras people =

This list of University of Madras people includes notable graduates, professors, and administrators affiliated with the University of Madras. Five heads of state and two Nobel laureates have been associated with the university.

== Arts ==
- K. A. Nilakanta Sastri, Historian and author, Padma Bhushan (1957)
- Sarvepalli Gopal, Indian historian, Padma Vibhushan (1999)
- Ranvir Shah, Founder of Prakriti Foundation
- Gemini Ganesan, Tamil film actor, Padma Shri (1971)
- Mani Ratnam, Film director, screenwriter and producer, Padma Shri (2002)
- Sashi Kumar, Journalist and film director, Founder, Asianet
- Chitra Ramanathan, Contemporary fine artist, Painting
- M.G. Ramachandran, Film actor and former Chief Minister of Tamil Nadu, Bharat Ratna (1988)
- Mahesh Babu, Telugu film actor, Filmfare Awards South (3), Nandi Awards (7)
- K. C. S. Paniker, Abstract painter, Lalit Kala Akademi Ratna (1976)

== Business and Economics ==
- Jay Vijayan, Chief Information Officer (CIO) at Tesla Motors
- Kakkadan Nandanath Raj, one of the architects of the Five-Year Plans of India, Padma Vibhushan (2000)
- Raja Chelliah, Founding chairman of the Madras School of Economics, Padma Vibhushan (2007)
- C. K. Prahalad, Prominent business thinker, Padma Bhushan (2009)
- Prathap C. Reddy, Founder, Apollo Hospitals, Padma Vibhushan (2010)
- Ram Shriram, Founding board member of Google Inc.
- Verghese Kurien, Father of White Revolution in India, Padma Vibhushan (1999)
- Indra Nooyi, chairman, PepsiCo, Padma Bhushan (2007)
- Srikanth Balachandran, Global CFO, Bharti Airtel
- Suresh Krishna, TVS Group, Padma Shri (2006)
- Kalanithi Maran, Founder and chairman of Sun Group
- Kasinathuni Nageswara Rao, Founder of Amrutanjan Healthcare and Andhra Patrika
- Usha Ananthasubramanian, chairman and managing director of the Bhartiya Mahila Bank
- Mahesh Amalean, Engineer and industrialist, Deshamanya (2005)
- Pushkala Prasad, Zankel Chair Professor of Management and Liberal Arts at Skidmore College

== Civil Servants and Diplomats ==
Name	Class Year	Degree	College	Notability	References
Benegal Rama Rau				4th Governor of Reserve Bank of India	
C. Sylendra Babu				Director General of Police, Tamil Nadu (since 2021)	
C. Rangarajan			Loyola	19th Governor of Reserve Bank of India	
F. V. Arul			Loyola; Madras Christian College	Director of CBI (1968–1971)	
K. P. S. Menon				1st Foreign Secretary of India	
K. Vijay Kumar			Madras Christian College	Director General of Police	
Kalyan Sundaram				2nd Chief Election Commissioner of India	
M. K. Narayanan			Loyola	Governor of West Bengal; 3rd National Security Adviser of India	
N. Vittal				Chief Vigilance Commissioner (1998–2002)	
R. V. S. Peri Sastri				8th Chief Election Commissioner of India	
S. Jagannathan				10th Governor of Reserve Bank of India	
T. N. Seshan				10th Chief Election Commissioner of India	
Y. Venugopal Reddy		M.A. in Economics		21st Governor of Reserve Bank of India	

== Humanities and Social Sciences ==
Name	Class Year	Degree	College	Notability	References
David Davidar				Author and publisher, Former CEO of Penguin Group	
Muhammed Muhsin		MPhil		Politician, MLA - Kerala Legislative Assembly	
Karuppannan Jaishankar				criminologist	
P. Gururaja Bhat	1952			historian	
R. S. Subbalakshmi				Social reformer and educationist	
S. Krishnaswami Aiyangar				historian and indologist	
S. R. Ranganathan		BA; MA	Madras Christian College	library scientist known for developing the colon classification	
V. Venkayya				Chief epigraphist, Government of India (1908–1912)	

== Literature ==
Name	Class Year	Degree	College	Notability	References
M. Govinda Pai				Kannada poet and writer, Rashtrakavi (1949)	
Madhavan Ayyappath				poet and writer	
Sachchidananda Vatsyayan	1927			Hindi poet and writer, Jnanpith Award (1978), Sahitya Akademi Award (1964)	
Srirangam Srinivasarao				Telugu poet and lyricist, Sahitya Akademi Award (1972)	
Kuzhanthai				Tamil poet	
Vanamali				Telugu poet and lyricist, PhD in Telugu literature	

== Military ==
Every Gentlemen Cadet from Officers Training Academy (OTA) Chennai gets a masters degree from University of Madras

Name	Class Year	Degree	College	Notability	References
Idris Hasan Latif			Nizam (Note: The Nizam College was affiliated to the University of Madras between 1887 and 1947.)	former Chief of Air Staff of the Indian Air Force	
Jagath Jayasuria	1990	MSc		former Chief of Defence Staff of the Sri Lankan Armed Forces	
K. M. Cariappa			Presidency	former Chief of the Army Staff of the Indian Army	
Krishnaswamy Sundarji		MSc		former Chief of the Army Staff of the Indian Army	
Purna Chandra Thapa				former Chief of Army Staff of the Nepalese Army	
Zameer Uddin Shah		MSc		former Deputy Chief of Army Staff (Personnel & Systems), Indian Army	
Hamzah Sahat	2010	MPhil		former Commander of the Royal Brunei Armed Forces	
Alirupendi				former Joint Force Commander of the Royal Brunei Armed Forces	

== Politics and Law ==
=== Heads of State ===
Name	Class Year	Degree	College	Notability	References
Chakravarthi Rajagopalachari	1897		Presidency	Governor-General of India (1948–1950)	
Sarvepalli Radhakrishnan	1906		Madras Christian College	2nd President of India (1962–1967)	
Neelam Sanjeeva Reddy				6th President of India (1977–1982)	
R. Venkataraman			Loyola	8th President of India (1987–1992)	
A. P. J. Abdul Kalam			St. Joseph's (Note: The St. Joseph's College was affiliated to the University of Madras between 1869 and 1982.)	11th President of India (2002–2007)	

=== Supreme Court Judges ===
Name	Class Year	Degree	College	Notability	References
Patanjali Sastri				2nd Chief Justice of India	
K. Subba Rao				9th Chief Justice of India	
Muhammad Shahabuddin				3rd Chief Justice of Pakistan	
P. Sathasivam				40th Chief Justice of India	
V. Balakrishna Eradi				Judge of the Supreme Court of India; 9th Chief Justice of Kerala High Court	
Doraiswamy Raju				Judge of the Supreme Court of India	

=== Others ===
Name	Class Year	Degree	College	Notability	References
A. J. John	1919		Madras Law College (Note: The Dr. Ambedkar Government Law College (also known as Government Law College and Madras Law College) was affiliated to the University of Madras between 1891 and 1996.)	Former Chief Minister of Travancore-Cochin and Governor of Madras	
Arcot Ramasamy Mudaliar			Madras Christian College	Last Diwan of Mysore, Padma Vibhushan (1970)	
B. Munuswamy Naidu			Madras Christian College	Chief Minister of Madras Presidency	
CN Annadurai				First Chief Minister of Tamil Nadu	
C. P. Ramaswami Iyer				Diwan of Travancore (1936–1947)	
C. Joseph Vijay	Did not graduate		Loyola College	Chief Minister of Tamil Nadu (2026–present)	
C. Vijayaraghavachariar	1875		Presidency	President of the Indian National Congress (1920)	
Chidambaram Subramaniam		BSc in Physics	Presidency; Madras Law College	Indian independence activist, Bharat Ratna (1998)	
K. K. Nayar				Member of Parliament, Lok Sabha	
K. V. Reddy Naidu				Chief Minister of Madras Presidency (1937)	
Kasu Brahmananda Reddy			Presidency	Chief Minister of Andhra Pradesh	
M. Thambidurai				Deputy Speaker of the Lok Sabha	
Mukhtar Ahmed Ansari			Madras Medical College (Note: The Madras Medical College was affiliated to the University of Madras between 1857 and 1988.)	surgeon and President of the Indian National Congress	
Nittoor Srinivasa Rau	1927	LLB	Madras Law College	Chief Justice of the High Court of Mysore State	
P. Subbarayan			Presidency	Chief Minister of Madras Presidency (1924–1930)	
P. V. Rajamannar	1921		Presidency	Chief Justice of Madras High Court	
Palaniappan Chidambaram				Minister of Finance	
Paravoor T. K. Narayana Pillai				Prime Minister of Travancore and the first Chief Minister of Travancore-Cochin	
Shankarrao Chavan				Cabinet Minister	
V. K. Krishna Menon	1918		Presidency	Minister of Defence	

== Educationists ==
- M. Aram, Educator and peace advocate, Padma Shri (1990)
- G. Viswanathan, Founder and chancellor, VIT University
- V. M. Muralidharan, Chairman, Ethiraj College for Women
- Swami Atmapriyananda, Physics academic, Vice-Chancellor, Ramakrishna Mission Vivekananda Educational and Research Institute(2005-2020)

== Religion ==
Name	Class Year	Degree	College	Notability	References
Ian Ernest				Archbishop of the Indian Ocean	
Joshua Russell Chandran		BA; MA			

== Science, Technology, Engineering and Mathematics ==
=== Nobel Laureates ===
Name	Class Year	Degree	College	Notability	References
C. V. Raman	1904; 1907	BA; MA	Presidency	Nobel Prize in Physics (1930), Bharat Ratna (1954)	
Subrahmanyan Chandrasekhar	1930	BSc in Physics	Presidency	Nobel Prize in Physics (1983), Padma Vibhushan (1968)	

=== Abel Prize Winners ===
Name	Class Year	Degree	College	Notability	References
S. R. Srinivasa Varadhan	1959	BSc	Presidency	Abel Prize (2007), Padma Bhushan (2008), National Medal of Science (2010), Birkhoff Prize (1994)	

=== Turing Awardee ===
Name	Class Year	Degree	College	Notability	References
Raj Reddy	1958	Bachelors in Civil Engineering	College of Engineering, Guindy (Then affiliated to Madras University)	Turing Award (1994), Legion of Honour (1985), Padma Bhushan (2001)	

=== Others ===
Name	Class Year	Degree	College	Notability	References
A. Lakshmanaswami Mudaliar			Madras Christian College	Padma Vibhushan (1963)	
Alladi Ramakrishnan				Theoretical physicist, founder of the Institute of Mathematical Sciences	
Arunachala Sreenivasan				Nutritional scientist and Padma Bhushan awardee	
C. V. Subramanian				Mycologist and plant pathologist, Shanti Swarup Bhatnagar Prize (1965)	
E. C. George Sudarshan				Theoretical physicist, Dirac Prize (2010), Padma Vibhushan (2007)	
G.N. Ramachandran				Biophysicist who described the structure of Collagen	
Gunamudian David Boaz				1st Indian Psychologist (1943)	
Janaki Ammal				Botanist and Cytologist, Padma Shri (1977)	
K. G. Ramanathan		M.A. in Mathematics		Padma Bhushan (1983), Shanti Swarup Bhatnagar Prize (1965)	
K. S. Krishnan				Physicist, Co-discoverer of Raman scattering, Padma Bhushan (1954)	
M. Visveshwarya	1881	B.A.	Central College of Bangalore (Note: The Central College of Bangalore was affiliated to the University of Madras between 1858 and 1964.)	Civil engineer, Bharat Ratna (1955)	
Mushi Santappa				Polymer chemist, Shanti Swarup Bhatnagar Prize (1967)	
Natchimuthuk Gopalswamy				Solar physicist, President of International Astronomical Union Commission 49	
Om Dutt Gulati				pharmacologist, Shanti Swarup Bhatnagar and B. C. Roy laureate	
Srinivasan Chandrasekaran				organic chemist, Shanti Swarup Bhatnagar laureate	
Raja Ramanna				Nuclear scientist, Padma Vibhushan (1975)	
Rajagopala Chidambaram				Nuclear scientist, Padma Vibhushan (1999)	
Srinivasa Ramanujan				Mathematical prodigy	
Srinivasan Varadarajan				Chemist and Padma Bhushan awardee	
Tanjore R. Anantharaman				Materials scientist, Shanti Swarup Bhatnagar Prize (1967)	
Toppur Seethapathy Sadasivan				Plant pathologist and Padma Bhushan (1974) awardee	
Udupi Ramachandra Rao	1952	BSc		space scientist, Padma Vibhushan (2017)	
V. Sasisekharan				Molecular biologist, Shanti Swarup Bhatnagar Prize (1978)	
Vasanthy Arasaratnam		BSc		Biochemist, Vice-chancellor of the University of Jaffna (2011 – present)	
Vilayanur S. Ramachandran				Cognitive neuroscientist, Ariëns Kappers Medal (1999)	

- Pakkiriswamy Chandra Sekharan, Forensic expert and Padma Bhushan winner
- John Barnabas, Evolutionary biologist, Shanti Swarup Bhatnagar Prize (1974)
- Avadhesha Surolia, Glycobiologist, Shanti Swarup Bhatnagar Prize (1987)
- Thavamani Jegajothivel Pandian, Geneticist, Shanti Swarup Bhatnagar Prize (1984)
- Narayanaswamy Srinivasan, Molecular biophysicist, Shanti Swarup Bhatnagar Prize (2007)
- T. R. Govindachari, Natural product chemist, Shanti Swarup Bhatnagar Prize (1960)
- P. T. Narasimhan, theoretical chemist, Shanti Swarup Bhatnagar (1970)
- Paramasivam Natarajan, photochemist, Shanti Swarup Bhatnagar (1984)
- Siva Umapathy, organometallic chemist, Shanti Swarup Bhatnagar laureate.
- Subramania Ranganathan, organic chemist, Shanti Swarup Bhatnagar laureate
- Govindasamy Mugesh, physical chemist, Shanti Swarup Bhatnagar laureate
- Kunchithapadam Gopalan, geochronologist, Shanti Swarup Bhatnagar laureate
- Rengaswamy Ramesh, geophysicist, Shanti Swarup Bhatnagar laureate
- Mangalore Anantha Pai, electrical engineer, Shanti Swarup Bhatnagar laureate
- Nuggehalli Raghuveer Moudgal, endocrinologist, Shanti Swarup Bhatnagar laureate
- E. S. Raja Gopal, physicist, Shanti Swarup Bhatnagar laureate
- Muthusamy Lakshmanan, theoretical physicist, Shanti Swarup Bhatnagar laureate
- E. V. Sampathkumaran, condensed matter physicist, Shanti Swarup Bhatnagar laureate
- K. Sekar, bioinformatician, N-Bios laureate
- Kumaravel Somasundaram, cancer biologist, N-Bios laureate
- G. Dhinakar Raj, veterinary scientist, N-Bios laureate
- S. Ganesh, molecular geneticist, N-Bios laureate
- P. Karthe, structural biologist, N-Bios laureate
- C. S. Seshadri (FRS), Shanti Swarup Bhatnagar Prize (1972)
- M. S. Narasimhan (FRS), Shanti Swarup Bhatnagar Prize (1975)
- K. S. Chandrasekharan, Srinivasa Ramanujan Medal (1966), Shanti Swarup Bhatnagar Prize (1963)
- M. S. Raghunathan (FRS), Srinivasa Ramanujan Medal (1991), Shanti Swarup Bhatnagar Prize (1977)
- Sundararaman Ramanan, Srinivasa Ramanujan Medal (2010), Shanti Swarup Bhatnagar Prize (1979)
- C. P. Ramanujam, Ramanujam–Samuel theorem and Ramanujam vanishing theorem
- Krishnaswami Alladi, Fellow of American Mathematical Society
- A.V. Balakrishnan, Control Heritage Award (2001)
- Rangaswamy Srinivasan, pioneer work on Excimer laser at IBM Research, National Medal of Technology (2011)
- M. S. Swaminathan, Father of Green Revolution in India, Padma Vibhushan (1989)

== Sports ==
Name	Class Year	Degree	College	Notability	References
Dipika Pallikal Karthik			Ethiraj	Squash player	
Eric Prabhakar				Olympian sprinter	
Ramanathan Krishnan				Tennis player, Arjuna award (1961), Padma Bhushan (1967)	
Syed Mohammad Hadi			Nizam	First class cricketer and tennis player	
Vijay Amritraj				Tennis player and sports commentator, UN Messengers of Peace (2001), Padma Shri (1983)	
Viswanathan Anand		B.Com.	Loyola	Chess Grandmaster and former World Chess Champion, Padma Vibhushan (2007)	

== Others ==
- Siva Shankar Baba
- A. P. Balachandran
- A.V. Balakrishnan
- Bapu
- Chinmayananda Saraswati
- Chunkath Joseph Varkey
- Aswath Damodaran
- Ryder Devapriam
- Sudi Devanesen
- P. C. Devassia
- Methil Devika
- Michael Fernandes
- Anthony Leocadia Fletcher
- C.K. Gandhirajan
- Ramanathan Gnanadesikan
- Vijayalakshmy K. Gupta
- Randor Guy
- Lakshmi Holmström
- M. Yousuff Hussaini
- I. C. Chacko
- Cherakarottu Korula Jacob
- Alangar Jayagovind
- L. S. Kandasamy
- C. Kesavan
- Sundeep Kishan
- Kuppuswamy Kalyanasundaram
- A. D. Loganathan
- A. Sreedhara Menon
- Ram Mohan
- A. C. Muthiah
- Sameer Nair
- Joseph C. Panjikaran
- P. J. Thomas, Parakunnel
- Joseph Parecattil
- A. Sivathanu Pillai
- N. U. Prabhu
- Samantha Ruth Prabhu
- A. Sreekar Prasad
- Neelu
- R. Radhakrishnan
- Bellary Raghava
- R. K. Raghavan
- P. V. Rajaraman
- N. Ram
- K. R. Ramanathan
- K. P. Ratnam
- Palagummi Sainath
- B. A. Saletore
- Uma Sambanthan
- Ratnasothy Saravanamuttu
- C. S. Seshadri
- Shiva Rajkumar
- M. J. Rabi Singh
- Molly Easo Smith
- C. G. Somiah
- Raman Sukumar
- M. A. Sumanthiran
- Lily Thomas
- Typist Gopu
- Carlos G. Vallés
- Alarmel Valli
- T. G. Venkatraman
- Ravindra Wijegunaratne
- Virendranath Chattopadhyaya
- Pradeep John
