= C. V. Subramanian =

Indian mycologist, taxonomist and plant pathologist

- Born: 11 August 1924; Ernakulam, Kerala India
- Died: 5 February 2016 (aged 91); Bangkok, Thailand
- Education: University of Madras; University of Cambridge; Commonwealth Mycological Institute
- Known for: Studies on Fungi imperfecti
- Awards: 1944 UoM Pulney Andi Gold Medal; 1965 Shanti Swarup Bhatnagar Prize; 1973 Rafi Ahmed Kidwai Award; 1972 IBS Birbal Sahni Medal; 2000 Janaki Ammal National Award; 2009 IBS Lifetime Achievement Award
- Scientific career
- Fields: Mycology; Plant pathology
- Workplaces: Indian Agricultural Research Institute; University of Rajasthan; University of Madras
- Doctoral advisor: T. S. Sadasivan

Chirayathumadom Venkatachalier Subramanian (11 August 1924 – 5 February 2016), popularly known as CVS, was an Indian mycologist, taxonomist and plant pathologist, known for his work on the classification of Fungi imperfecti, a group of fungi classified separately due to lack of specific taxonomic characteristics. He authored one monograph, Hyphomycetes: An Account of Indian Species, Except Cercosporae and three books, Hyphomycetes, taxonomy and biology, Moulds, Mushrooms and Men and Soil microfungi of Israel, besides several articles published in peer-reviewed journals. He was a recipient of many honours including the Rafi Ahmed Kidwai Award of the Indian Council of Agricultural Research, the Janaki Ammal National Award of the Government of India and seven species of fungi have been named after him. The Council of Scientific and Industrial Research, the apex agency of the Government of India for scientific research, awarded him the Shanti Swarup Bhatnagar Prize for Science and Technology, one of the highest Indian science awards, in 1965, for his contributions to biological sciences.

== Biography ==
C. V. Subramanian was born on 11 August 1924 at Kochi in Ernakulam district, the commercial capital of the south Indian state of Kerala, to T. D. Parvathi Ammal and C. M. Venkatachalier, a lawyer. He did his schooling at Sree Rama Varma High School, a government-run school in the city and did his early college studies at Maharaja's College after which he joined the Presidency College, Chennai from where he graduated (BSc Hons) with first rank in 1941. It was during this period he had the opportunity to meet M. O. P. Iyengar, the renowned algologist, who was known to have fostered Subramanian's interest in phycology. Before completing his master's degree (MA) in mycology in 1944, he prepared his first dissertation on Acanthus ilicifolius, a halophyte found in the saline waters of western coastal India. Subsequently, he joined Toppur Seethapathy Sadasivan (Note: Toppur Seethapathy Sadasivan was the first recipient of the Shanti Swarup Bhatnagar Prize for Bialogical Sciences.) as the first research student of the plant pathologist who also headed the Centre for Advanced Studies in Botany of the University of Madras during that time. He received his doctoral degree (PhD) in 1948 for his thesis, Soil conditions and wilt diseases in plants with special reference to Fusarium vasinfectum Atk. on cotton after which he continued his research on mycology and did post-doctoral research, on an ICS fellowship of the Indian National Science Academy (then known as the National Institute of Sciences of India) at the Botany School of Cambridge University and, later at Commonwealth Mycological Institute, UK where he was associated with known mycologists, Stephen Denis Garrett and E. W. Mason.

Subramanian started his academic career in 1951 when he joined the University of Madras as a senior lecturer where he rose to the position of a reader in 1953. During this period, he continued his researches and his published work, Floristic and taxonomic studies on Fungi Imperfecti, earned him the degree of DSc in 1957 from the University of Madras. A year later, the Indian Agricultural Research Institute created a new Chair in Plant Pathology and invited Subramanian to hold the position which he did till his move to the University of Rajasthan in 1960. There, he established the Department of Botany and headed the department as its founder professor till his return to Madras University in 1964 as a professor of Botany. In 1973, he succeeded his mentor, T. S. Sadasivan as the head of the Centre for Advanced Study in Botany, a position he held till his superannuation in 1985. He continued his academic career past his official retirement and worked as a visiting professor at such institutions as the National University of Singapore, the University of Western Australia and the National Taiwan University.

Subramanian was married to Subbalakshmi and the couple lived in Nungambakkam, Chennai. It was during one of his trips to Thailand, he died in Bangkok on 5 February 2016, at the age of 91, survived by his wife and two sons, C. S. Venkatachalam and C. S. Seshadri, both engineers by profession.

== Legacy ==
=== Professional contributions ===
Subramanian was involved with a number of science academies and societies in India, starting with his membership of the Indian Academy of Sciences at the age of 32, reportedly chosen personally by C. V. Raman, the renowned physicist, where he would later serve as the vice-president from 1977 to 1985. He served as a member of the Indian National Science Academy, International Union of Biological Sciences, Royal Academies for Science and the Arts of Belgium and British Mycological Society. He was the president of the International Mycological Association in 1977 and presided over its annual congress held in Tokyo in 1983. In 1973, he led a group of mycologists who founded the Mycological Society of India for promoting mycological researches. The society has since grown to be a national organisation with 400 members and interest in studies related to taxonomy, ecology, pathology, genetics, molecular biology and physiology. The society also publishes a journal, Kavaka and he was its founder editor, holding the position till 1998. He was also a member of the University Grants Commission from 1977 to 1982. It was reported that Subramanian personally appealed to Indira Gandhi, the then Indian prime minister, to abandon the proposed hydro-electric project in the Silent Valley, a bio-reserve area in his home state of Kerala, eventually leading to its declaration as a national park in 1985.

=== Scientific contributions ===
While serving as a senior lecturer at Madras University, Subramanian published a two-volume work in 1956 under the title, List of Indian Fungi, which listed the known species of fungi in India. Major focus of his research was on Fungi imperfecti. He was known to have conducted extensive research on Hyphomycetes and his work has been detailed in a monograph, Hyphomycetes: An Account of Indian Species, Except Cercosporae, published in 1971 and another book, Hyphomycetes, taxonomy and biology, published in 1983, where he proposed a classification based on conidium ontogenesis. He also proposed a new nomenclature protocol based on Sanskrit terminology; MycoBank, an online repository managed by the International Mycological Association has listed 384 genera of fungi named by him and Angulimaya, Dwayabeeja, Kutilakesa, Nalalanthamala, and Tharoopama are some of them. He worked on the re-assessment of Dematiaceous hyphomycetes and his work assisted in reclassifying the genus by attempting to disprove that Sporidesmium had a different ancestral species (monophyletic). Aspergillus, a genus of moulds, was another subject of his developmental taxonomical studies and his research on its teleomorphs helped in the better understanding of the fungi. His researches also explained the systematics, distribution and ecological behaviour of Fusarium and Drechslera, two plant pathogens. He documented his researches in several articles and books besides the ones noted above; Moulds, Mushrooms and Men and Soil microfungi of Israel are two such works.

== Awards and honours ==
The University of Madras awarded Subramanian the Pulney Andi Gold Medal in 1944 for academic excellence on his completion of the master's degree. The Indian Academy of Sciences elected him as their fellow in 1955 and Indian National Science Academy followed suit with their fellowship in 1960. He received the Shanti Swarup Bhatnagar Prize, one of the highest Indian science awards, from the Council of Scientific and Industrial Research in 1965. The Birbal Sahni Medal of the Indian Botanical Society reached him in 1972; the society would again honour him in 2009 with their Lifetime Achievement Award. The Indian Council of Agricultural Research awarded him the Rafi Ahmed Kidwai Award in 1973 and he held the Jawaharlal Nehru Fellowship from 1976 to 1978. The Mycological Society of America selected him as their honorary member in 1983 and the Government of India awarded him the E. K. Janaki Ammal National Award for Taxonomy in 2000. The scientific community honoured Subramanian for his work; Subramaniula, Subramanianospora, Subramaniomyces, Subramania, Ceeveesubramaniomyces, Civisubramaniana and Ascosubramania are seven genera of fungi named after him.

== Selected bibliography ==
- C. V. Subramanian; K. Ramakrishnan (1956). List of Indian Fungi. Emkay Publications. OCLC 858868381.
- Chirayathumadom Venkatachalier Subramanian (1971). Hyphomycetes: An Account of Indian Species, Except Cercosporae. Indian Council of Agricultural Research.
- C. V. Subramanian (1973). Taxonomy of fungi : proceedings of the International Symposium on Taxonomy of Fungi (2 volumes). University of Madras. OCLC 5281883.
- Chirayathumadom Venkatachalier Subramanian (1976). Moulds, Mushrooms and Men. Birbal Sahni Institute of Paleobotany.
- C. V. Subramanian (April 1982). "Tropical Mycology: Future Needs and Development". Current Science. 51 (7).
- Chirayathumadom Venkatachalier Subramanian (1983). Hyphomycetes, taxonomy and biology. Academic Press. ISBN 978-0-12-675620-3.
- C. V. Subramanian (April 1988). "A new species of Spegazzinia from Western Australia". Proc. Indian Acad. Sci. (Plant Sci.). 98 (2): 67–69. doi:10.1007/BF03053392. S2CID 134920625.
- Chirayathumadom Venkatachalier Subramanian; Solomon Pavlovich Vasser (2001). Soil microfungi of Israel. A.R.A. Gantner. ISBN 978-3-904144-76-6.

The standard author abbreviation Subram. is used to indicate this person as the author when citing a botanical name.

== See also ==
- Subramaniula
- Ascosubramania
- Toppur Seethapathy Sadasivan
- List of Madras University alumni
- Mycological Society of America
- Mycological Society of India
