= Mamiyil Sabu =

Indian plant taxonomist (born 1959)

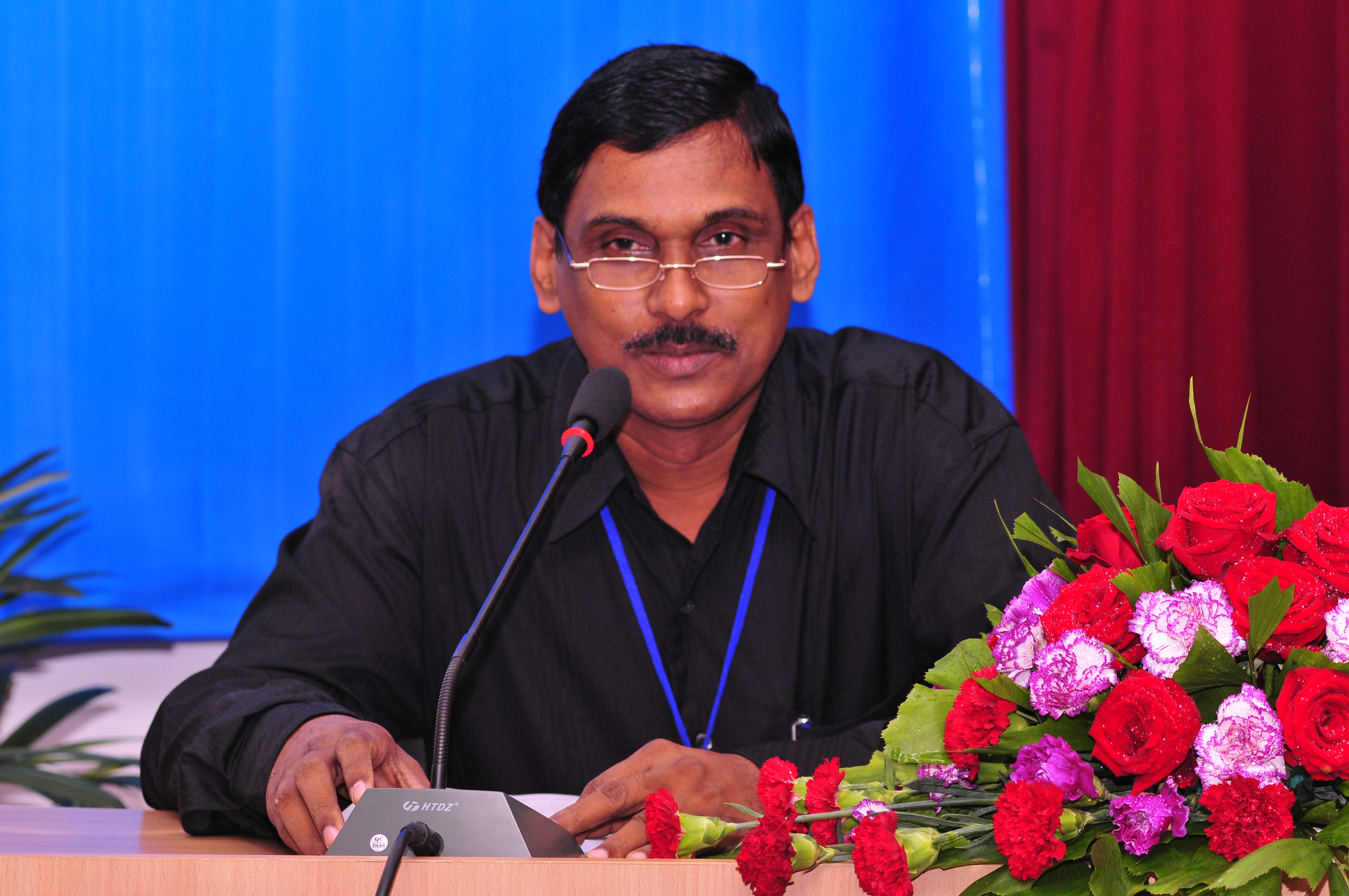
- Born: 31 May 1959 (age 66); Olavanna, Kozhikode district, Kerala, India
- Scientific career
- Fields: Plant taxonomy
- Institutions: Department of Botany, University of Calicut; Botanical Garden & Institute for Plant Sciences (KSCSTE-MBGIPS)
- Thesis: Taxonomic and Phylogenetic studies on South Indian Zingiberaceae
- Author abbrev. (botany): M. Sabu
- Website: www.gingersofindia.com

Mamiyil Sabu (Dr M. Sabu) formerly Head of the Department of Botany, University of Calicut and currently working as CSIR-Emeritus Scientist at Malabar Botanical Garden and Institute for Plant Sciences, Kozhikode district, Kerala, India. He worked for over 37 years on the research of gingers, (Order Zingiberales) which include families such as Cannaceae, Marantaceae (arrowroot family), Zingiberaceae (ginger family), Heliconiaceae, Costaceae, Musaceae (banana family) etc. A comprehensive work on these groups have been taken after a gap of 125 years, which resulted in the discovery of several new species and rediscovery of many species after 155 years.

Sabu has published over 168 research papers and 12 books as author and co-author. He and his associates have discovered over 58 new species of flowering plants and eight cultivars new to science. He has contributed significantly to the study of Indian angiosperm taxonomy by serving as Secretary and Treasurer of Indian Association for Angiosperm Taxonomy for more than 20 years.

He has been officiating as the officer-in-charge of Calicut University Botanic Garden since 1999 to 2019. He has taken up programmes for the conservation of endangered taxa through MoEF & CC Project.

== Birth and early life ==
Sabu was born at Olavanna, Kozhikode, and went to school in Calicut. He enrolled for undergraduate studies in botany at Farook College and post-graduate from Guruvayoorappan College. He secured a Ph.D. on the topic “Taxonomic and Phylogenetic studies on South Indian Zingiberaceae” under the guidance of Prof. Jose K. Mangaly from University of Calicut, Kerala. He presently stays in Olavanna, Calicut.

== Career ==
Sabu has been working as Lecturer and Senior Lecturer in various Sree Narayana Colleges in Kerala for 16 years and Calicut University as Reader and Professor about 20 years. He officiated as Head of the Department of Botany, University of Calicut from 2012 to 2014. Presently he is working as CSIR- Emeritus Scientist at Malabar Botanical Garden and Institute for Plant Sciences, Calicut. He has been teaching taxonomy since 1985 for UG and PG students and creating awareness of Taxonomy through organizing National and International seminars and workshops.

Sabu has been working on the Taxonomy of Indian Zingiberaceae since 1996. Taxonomic Revision of South Indian Zingiberaceae was over and a book entitled “Zingiberaceae and Costaceae of South India” was released at Singapore Botanical Garden in July 2006. A germplasm of over 190 species and 2000 accessions of live plants in the ginger gene bank of Calicut University Botanical Garden is established. This forms the largest collection of Indigenous gingers in India. Exotic and ornamental gingers from China, Japan, Thailand and Malaysia are also grown. He has over 160 papers in National and International Journals and five books to his credit. Apart from the Taxonomy, he has also dealt with aspects of Palynology, Cytology and Dermal Morphology, molecular aspects of all Zingiberaceae members of South India. Dr. M. Sabu described 65 taxa new to science and reported five new generic records, six new combinations, 15 new species records for India, nine for South India, and 16 name changes/synonyms. Rediscovery of 11 taxa after 57 to 155 years, which includes some supposed to be extinct taxa. The IUCN status of all Indian gingers were assessed. The revision of Indian Musaceae and Marantaceae was over. The largest germplasm of Indian Musaceae and Marantaceae is established in the Botanical Garden of Calicut University which contain more than 30 taxa and over 200 accessions. Musaceae Revision is published with four new taxa and several new records to India and rediscoveries after a lapse of 50–100 years. He has also prepared a database of Indian Zingiberaceae, Musaceae and Marantaceae.

== Awards and recognition ==
- E.K. Janaki Ammal National Award for Plant Taxonomy (2018) - instituted by Ministry of Environment, Forest and Climate Change (MoEF&CC), Govt. of India.
- Prof. Panchanan Maheswari Gold Medal (2010) - instituted by Indian Botanical Society
- Prof. V.V. Sivarajan Gold Medal (2014) – Instituted by Indian Association for Angiosperm Taxonomy
- Best Researcher Award of Calicut University – University of Calicut
- Fellow of Indian National Science Academy (FNA)
- Fellow of Indian Academy of Science (FASc)
- Fellow Indian Association for Angiosperm Taxonomy (FIAT)
- Elected Fellow of the Linnean Society, London (2012) (FLS)
- Elected as the Secretary of the Indian Association for Angiosperm Taxonomy (2009–2014)
- Nominated as IUCN Species Survival Commission Indian Subcontinent Plant Specialist Group member
- Fellow of the Indian Botanical Society (FBS)
- Fellow of Society for Plant Reproductive Biology
- Executive Editor, Rheedea

== Plants named in honor of Dr Sabu ==
Five plants have been named after Sabu in recognition of his contributions in the field of Taxonomy.

- Amomum sabuanum V.P. Thomas, Nissar & U. Gupta
- Musa sabuana K. Prasad, Bheem & BRP Rao
- Zingiber sabuanum KMP Kumar & A. Joe
- Curculigo sabui S.P. Gaikwad & Gore
- Lepidagathis sabui Chandore, Bourde, Madhav & S.R. Yadav.
