= Vijayalakshmi =

Vijaya lakshmi
- Gender: Female
- Language: Tamil, other Indian languages

Origin
- Meaning: "goddess of victory"
- Region of origin: India

Other names
- Related names: Vijaya, Vijayalakshmy, Vijayalaxmi

Vijaya lakshmi is a Hindu Indian feminine given name or surname, which means "goddess of victory". The name may refer to:

== People ==
=== First name ===
- Vijayalakshmi Atluri, Indian computer scientist
- Vijayalakshmi (Kannada actress), Indian actress
- Vijayalakshmi (poet) (born 1960), Indian poet
- Vijayalakshmi Feroz (born 1982), Indian actress
- Vijayalakshmy K. Gupta (born 1951), Indian civil servant
- Vijayalakshmi Navaneethakrishnan (born 1946), Indian musician
- Vijayalakshmi Ramanan, Surgeon and Indian Air Force officer
- Vijayalakshmi Ravindranath (born 1953), Indian neuroscientist
- Vijayalakshmy Subramaniam, Indian musician
- Vijaya Lakshmi Pandit, Indian diplomat and politician
- Vijayalakshmi 'Lara' Rajagopalan, member of girl group Katseye

=== Surname ===
- B. R. Vijayalakshmi, Indian cinematographer
- L. Vijayalakshmi, Indian actress
- Lalgudi Vijayalakshmi (born 1963), Indian musician
- Potturi Vijayalakshmi (born 1953), Indian writer
- Subbaraman Vijayalakshmi (born 1979), Indian chess player
- Vaikom Vijayalakshmi (born 1981), Indian singer

== See also ==
- Vijaya
- Lakshmi
