= Tikam Singh Rana =

Indian plant scientist (born 1969)

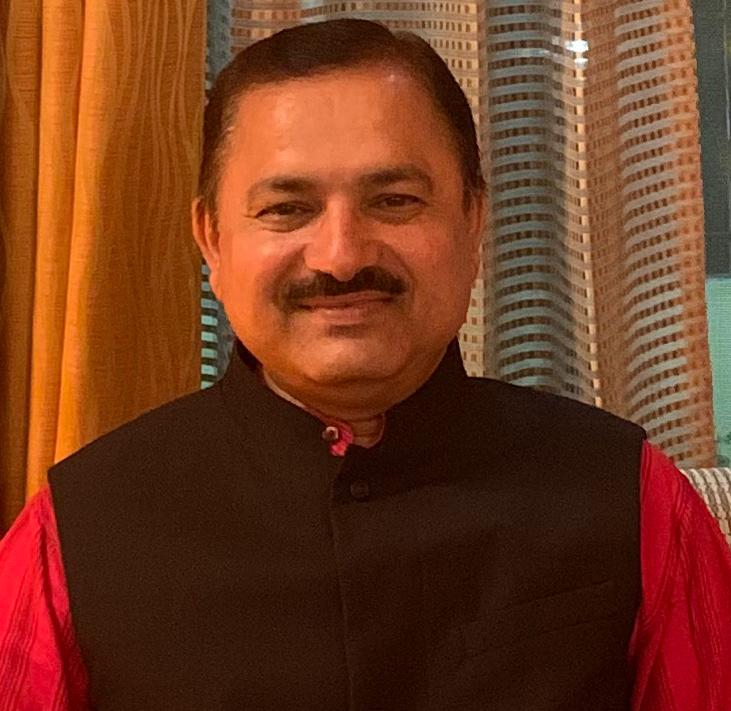
- Born: 5 June 1969 (age 57); Dehra Dun, Uttarakhand, India
- Scientific career
- Fields: Angiosperm taxonomy, molecular systematics
- Institutions: Plant Diversity, Systematics and Herbarium Division, CSIR - National Botanical Research Institute
- Author abbrev. (botany): Rana
- Website: nbri.res.in

Tikam Singh Rana (Hindi: टीकम सिंह राणा) (Dr T.S. Rana), is an Indian plant biologist, specializing in plant taxonomy, conservation biology, and molecular systematics. He currently holds the position of head of the CSIR-Human Resource Development Centre (HRDC). Prior to assuming this role, he served as chief scientist, head, and area coordinator of the Plant Diversity, Systematics, and Herbarium (PDSH) Division at the CSIR-National Botanical Research Institute (CSIR-NBRI) in Lucknow. Rana’s contributions to understanding the taxonomy and phylogeny of taxonomically complex and economically important taxa like Murraya sp., Chenopodium sp., Ocimum sp., Jatropha curcas, Taxus sp., Ephedra sp., Acorus calamus, Ficus sp., Sapindus sp., Bergenia sp., Betula sp., Uraria sp., Gymnema sp., etc. employing both phenotypic and molecular markers (RAPD, DAMD, ISSR, AFLP, SSRs and genes from nuclear ribosomal and chloroplast DNAs are exemplary). Rana has contributed towards the capacity building in plant taxonomy and bi-systematics by coordinating training courses from 2012 to 2018 for young faculty and students pursuing plant taxonomy in Indian Universities and Institutions.

== Education and career ==
Rana received bachelor's degree (1986-1988) in chemistry, zoology, and botany, and a master's degree (1988-1990) in botany from the DBS (PG) College, Dehra Dun and DAV (PG) College, Dehra Dun (HNB, Garhwal University, Srinagar, Uttarakhand), respectively. He then joined as junior scientist at CSIR-National Botanical Research Institute in 1992. Thereon, he served as scientist (1997-2001), senior scientist (2002-2005), principal scientist (2006-2010), and senior principal scientist (2011-2017). While as a staff scientist he did doctoral research (Ph.D.), and worked on ‘Floristic Studies and Assessment of Biodiversity in the Tons Valley (Garhwal Himalaya) Uttar Pradesh’ from the University of Lucknow, Lucknow (2000). Presently, he is working as chief scientist at CSIR-NBRI, Lucknow. Rana has also worked as a postdoctoral fellow at Institute of Plant Genetics and Crop Plant Research (IPK), Gatersleben, Germany, under BOYSCAST Fellowship (2001–2002) with Prof. Konrad Bachman.

Rana has over three decades research experience and his contributions range from classical plant taxonomy to modern molecular systematics. Dr. Rana has made contributions in Plant Taxonomy and Molecular Systematics. She has worked to assessment of biodiversity (floristic aspects) in the Himalayan regions such as Tons Valley, Govind wildlife Sanctuary, Corbett Tiger Reserve and Kumaun Himalaya (particularly on Weeds) and Indian Mangroves (Sonneratia) wherein a firsthand field information and critical evaluation of plants has been provided [Flora of Tons Valley Garhwal Himalaya (Uttaranchal), 2003; The Weeds of Kumaun Himalayan Region (Uttarakhand), 2016; Indian Mangroves: A photographic field identification guide, 2021]. He has published over 113 research papers and four books as author and co-author. Rana has contributed towards the capacity building in Plant Taxonomy and Biosystematics by organizing hands-on training courses and conferences for young faculties and students who are pursuing Plant Taxonomy in Indian Universities and Institutions. A book entitled ‘Plant Taxonomy and Biosystematics: Classical and Modern Methods’ (2014) authored by him, has a plethora of information on the variety of traditional and modern concepts of Plant Systematics.

== Eponymy ==
Gentiana ranae (Gentianaceae), a new species from India, have been named after Rana in recognition of his contribution to the field of plant molecular systematics.

== Awards and recognition ==
- Fellow of the Linnean Society (2020), London (FLS)
- Fellow of the Indian Botanical Society (FBS)
- BOYSCAST Fellowship (2001–2002)
- Fellow of Ethnobotanical Society of India (FES)
- Fellow of Indian Association for Angiosperm Taxonomy (FIAAT)
