= Etlingera fenzlii =

Conservation status
- Vulnerable (IUCN 3.1)

Scientific classification
- Kingdom: Plantae
- Clade: Tracheophytes
- Clade: Angiosperms
- Clade: Monocots
- Clade: Commelinids
- Order: Zingiberales
- Family: Zingiberaceae
- Genus: Etlingera
- Species: E. fenzlii

Binomial name
- Etlingera fenzlii (Kurz) Škorničk. & M.Sabu

Synonyms
- Amomum fenzlii Kurz; Cardamomum fenzlii (Kurz) Kuntze; Hornstedtia fenzlii (Kurz) K.Schum.

Species of plant

Etlingera fenzlii is a species of monocotyledonous plant in the family Zingiberaceae. It was first described by Wilhelm Sulpiz Kurz, and got its current name from Škornick. and M.Sabu.

The species' distribution area is the Nicobar Islands. No subspecies are listed in the Catalog of Life.
