= Androvax =

Vaccine

Combination of
- Androstendione: Androstane steroid
- Human serum albumin: Serum protein

Clinical data
- Trade names: Androvax
- Other names: Androstenedione:human serum albumin conjugate
- AHFS/Drugs.com: Monograph

Legal status
- Legal status: US: ℞-only

Identifiers
- CAS Number: 128280-53-5
- ChemSpider: None

Androvax, also known as androstenedione:human serum albumin conjugate, is an immunogen and vaccine against androstenedione that is used in veterinary medicine to increase the ovulation rate and number of lambs born to ewes. It is a conjugate of androstenedione and human serum albumin. The drug is marketed in New Zealand.

Androvax produces immunity against androstenedione, and the generation of antibodies against androstenedione decreases circulating levels of androstenedione. In addition, since androstenedione is the major precursor of estrogens, estrogen levels are decreased as well. This is thought to result in reduced negative feedback on the hypothalamic-pituitary-gonadal axis and increased gonadotropin secretion, which in turn improves fertility and fecundity.

== See also ==
- Ovandrotone albumin
