= Ovandrotone =

Chemical compound

Clinical data
- Other names: Androstenedione-7α-carboxyethylthioether; 3-[(3,17-Dioxoandrost-4-en-7α-yl)thio]propanoic acid

Identifiers
- IUPAC name: 3-{[(1S,2R,9R,10R,11S,15S)-2,15-Dimethyl-5,14-dioxotetracyclo[8.7.0.0^{2,7}.0^{11,15}]heptadec-6-en-9-yl]sulfanyl}propanoic acid
- CAS Number: 40845-00-9
- PubChem CID: 20538550
- ChemSpider: 59650713
- UNII: 5AJ49935NF

Chemical and physical data
- Formula: C_{22}H_{30}O_{4}S
- Molar mass: 390.54 g·mol^{−1}
- 3D model (JSmol): Interactive image
- SMILES: C[C@]12CC[C@H]3[C@H]([C@@H]1CCC2=O)[C@@H](CC1=CC(=O)CC[C@]31C)SCCC(O)=O
- InChI: InChI=1S/C22H30O4S/c1-21-8-5-14(23)11-13(21)12-17(27-10-7-19(25)26)20-15-3-4-18(24)22(15,2)9-6-16(20)21/h11,15-17,20H,3-10,12H2,1-2H3,(H,25,26)/t15-,16-,17+,20-,21?,22?/m0/s1; Key:OZLABWUNIWIISO-DHEJPUEPSA-N

Ovandrotone, also known as androstenedione-7α-carboxyethylthioether, is a synthetic androstane steroid and the C7α carboxyethylthioether of androstenedione. It is a component of ovandrotone albumin (Fecundin), a conjugate of androstenedione and human serum albumin and an immunogen and vaccine against androstenedione that is used to generate androgen immunity and thereby increase the ovulation rate and number of lambs born to ewes.
