= Custom peptide synthesis =

Commercial production of peptides

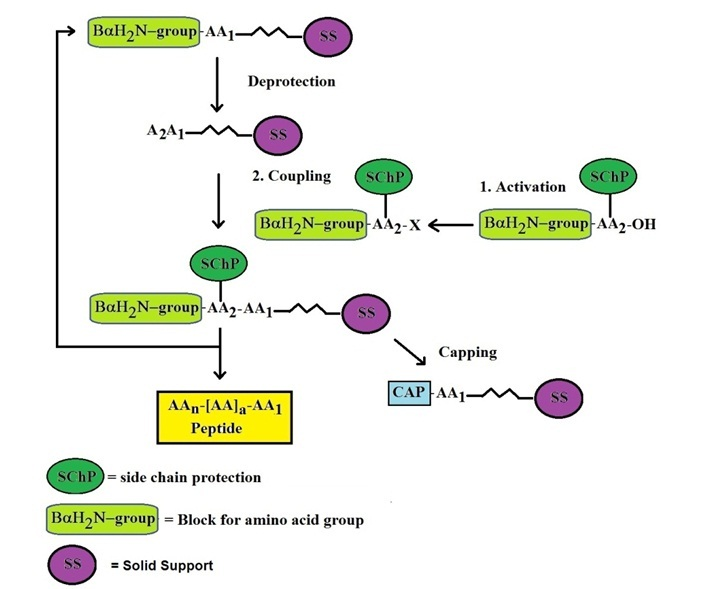
Solid phase peptide synthesis

Custom peptide synthesis is the commercial production of peptides for use in biochemistry, biology, biotechnology, pharmacology and molecular medicine. Custom peptide synthesis provides synthetic peptides as valuable tools to biomedical laboratories. Synthetic oligopeptides are used extensively in research for structure-function analysis (for example to study protein-protein interfaces), for the development of binding assays, the study of receptor agonist/antagonists or as immunogens for the production of specific antibodies. Generally, peptides are synthesized by coupling the carboxyl group or C-terminus of one amino acid to the amino group or N-terminus of another using automated solid phase peptide synthesis chemistries. However, liquid phase synthesis may also be used for specific needs.

== Automated solid phase polypeptide synthesis ==
Large scale custom peptide synthesis can be carried out either in a liquid solution or in solid phase. In general, peptides shorter than 8 amino acids are prepared more economically by solution chemistry. Peptides larger than 8 residues are generally assembled by solid phase chemistry. Solid phase peptide synthesis (SPPS) can be carried out either manually or in a fully automated fashion. Manual synthesis for short peptides is advantageous as it allows for more flexibility when scaling up and it permits troubleshooting of unexpected problems with more ease. For example, an operator can wash away piperidine during Fmoc deprotection, in the event of a power failure or instrument failure. Furthermore, thermodynamic mixing can be better controlled with a manual approach. On the other hand, large scale fully automated peptide synthesis instruments have the obvious advantage of unattended operation and extensive documentation of the synthesis run. Therefore, automated peptide synthesis is usually selected as the best choice for the synthesis of longer peptides in the mid-scale range.

== Commercial peptide synthesis ==
Peptide synthesis providers are measured by the quality level and the maximum length of the synthesized peptides since it is more difficult to synthesize longer peptides at a high quality. The synthesised peptides must undergo a QC procedure by analytical HPLC and mass spectrometry. Often, amino acid analysis and sequencing is also required.

== Applications of commercially synthesized peptides ==
Biologically active peptides have been integrated into a growing number of active pharmaceutical ingredients (API’s) as well as standalone products such as vasopressin, gonadorelin, leuprolide, and goserelin. Completion of the Human Genome Project resulted in the identification of approximately 30,000 proteins encoded in the human genome and provided many more new target molecules for biomedical researchers to explore. To investigate the possibility of increasing the native potency of a given peptide or protein using a rational design approach, small and large amounts of peptides are needed, Some in the milligram scale. Once a desired activity or potency is identified, larger scale synthesis is need. For this, gram to multi-gram scale may be needed in order to initiate small animal studies. Often, after successful validation, an even larger scale of synthesis may be desired. These can range in scale from hundreds of grams to multi-kilo amounts.
