= Raghavan Varadarajan =

Indian biophysicist and professor (b. 1960)

- Born: 27 November 1960 (age 65); India
- Education: Indian Institute of Technology, Kanpur; Stanford University; Yale University
- Known for: Protein structure Protein folding
- Awards: 1998 B. M. Birla Award for Biological Sciences; 2002 Shanti Swarup Bhatnagar Prize; 2013 CSIR G. N. Ramachandran Gold Medal
- Scientific career
- Fields: Biophysics
- Workplaces: Indian Institute of Science
- Doctoral advisor: Steven G. Boxer; Frederic M. Richards

Raghavan Varadarajan (born 27 November 1960) is an Indian biophysicist and a professor at the Indian Institute of Science. He is known for his researches in the fields of protein structure and protein folding and his contributions in developing vaccines and drugs for treating a type of fatal influenza and HIV-1. He is a former J. C. Bose National Fellow of the Department of Science and Technology and an elected fellow of the Indian Academy of Sciences and the Indian National Science Academy. The Council of Scientific and Industrial Research, the apex agency of the Government of India for scientific research, awarded him the Shanti Swarup Bhatnagar Prize for Science and Technology, one of the highest Indian science awards, in 2002, for his contributions to biological sciences.

== Biography ==
Born on 27 November 1960, Raghavan Varadarajan completed his graduate and master's degrees from the Indian Institute of Technology, Kanpur in 1982 and moved to the US for his doctoral studies at Stanford University under the guidance of Steven G. Boxer to secure a PhD. His post-doctoral studies were at Yale University at the laboratory of Frederic M. Richards during 1988–92 and he returned to India to start his academic career at the Indian Institute of Science (IISc) in 1992. Holding the position of a professor of Molecular Biophysics Unit, he heads The Varadarajan Laboratory of IISc which has research interests in the design of HIV-1 and influenza immunogens. He also serves as an honorary professor at Jawaharlal Nehru Centre for Advanced Scientific Research and as the chairman of the scientific board of Theramyt Novobiologics, a Bengaluru-based research platform (which he helped found), engaged in the development of biological drugs.

== Legacy ==
Varadarajan's early researches were focused on the interaction of protein molecules and their sequential properties. At Steven G. Boxer's laboratory, he worked on human myoglobin, a hemeprotein, and studied its dielectric properties as well as the redox potential/spectral properties of bound chromophores. Later, during his post-doctoral days at Yale, he researched on the structural and thermodynamic changes associated with cavity formation in proteins. Continuing his researches at IISc, he is known to have developed a new crystallographic and Nuclear magnetic resonance hydrogen exchange protocol for the characterization of disordered states of proteins, and his studies helped in the estimation of the hydrophobic driving force in protein folding. Collaborating with Merck Research Laboratories on behalf of Jawaharlal Nehru Centre for Advanced Scientific Research, his team developed a number of immunogens which have been demonstrated to have positive effect as HIV-1 vaccines and he holds the patent for the invention. Merck have tested the a few vaccines and some of the other proposals are being tested by International AIDS Vaccine Initiative.

Varadarajan has published his research findings by way of several articles (Note: Please see Selected bibliography section) and his publications have been listed in a number of online article repositories. He served as an investigator of the DBT-IAVI Programme jointly organized by the Department of Biotechnology and International AIDS Vaccine Initiative for the development of HIV vaccines. He has also mentored a number of scholars in their doctoral researches and has conducted seminars on his researches.

== Awards and honors ==
Varadarajan received the B. M. Birla Science Award of the B. M. Birla Science Centre in 1998 for his contributions to the study of protein structure and foldings and the Council of Scientific and Industrial Research (CSIR) awarded him the Shanti Swarup Bhatnagar Prize, one of the highest Indian science awards in 2002. In 2013, CSIR honored him again with the G. N. Ramachandran Gold Medal for Excellence in Biological Sciences and Technology. He received a number of research fellowships which included the Swarnajayanthi Fellowship for Biological Sciences of the Department of Science and Technology and AIDS-Innovation Grant Award of the National Institutes of Health ( both in 1999), Senior Research Fellowship of Wellcome Trust (2000) and the J. C. Bose National Fellowship of the Department of Science and Technology (2007–12). He is also an elected fellow of the Indian National Science Academy and the Indian Academy of Sciences. In 2024, Varadarajan became a laureate of the Asian Scientist 100 by the Asian Scientist.

== Selected bibliography ==
- Raghavan Varadarajan, Alex Szabo and Steven G. Boxer (September 1985). "Cloning, Expression in Escherichia coli, and Reconstitution of Human Myoglobin". Proceedings of the National Academy of Sciences. 82 (17): 5681–5684. Bibcode:1985PNAS...82.5681V. doi:10.1073/pnas.82.17.5681. PMC 390615. PMID 3898068.
- Raghavan Varadarajan, Thomas E. Zewart, Harry B. Gray, Steven G. Boxer (1989). "Effects of Buried Ionizable Amino Acids on the Reduction Potential of Recombinant Myoglobin". Science. 243 (4887): 69–73. Bibcode:1989Sci...243...69V. doi:10.1126/science.2563171. PMID 2563171.
- R. Varadarajan, H. A. Nagarajaram, C. Ramakrishnan (1996). "A procedure for the prediction of temperature-sensitive mutants of a globular protein based solely on the amino acid sequence". Proceedings of the National Academy of Sciences. 93 (24): 13908–13913. Bibcode:1996PNAS...9313908V. doi:10.1073/pnas.93.24.13908. PMC 19465. PMID 8943034.
- Suvobrata Chakravarty, Raghavan Varadarajan (June 2002). "Elucidation of factors responsible for enhanced thermal stability of proteins: a structural genomics based study". Biochemistry. 41 (25): 8152–61. doi:10.1021/bi025523t. PMID 12069608.
- B Citron, J Shiver, Tariq Najar, Xin Lu, J. ter Meulen, Gayathri Bommakanti, Xiaoping Liang, Kathleen Callahan, Walter Joyce, Danilo R. Casimiro, W Hepler, Gwendolyn J Heidecker, Raghavan Varadarajan (August 2010). "Design of an HA2-based Escherichia coli expressed influenza immunogen that protects mice from pathogenic challenge". Proceedings of the National Academy of Sciences. 107 (31): 13701–13706. doi:10.1073/pnas.1007465107. PMC 2922242. PMID 20615991.
- Gwendolyn J Heidecker, P. Sarma, Xin Lu, Kathleen Callahan, Raghavan Varadarajan, V. Vamsee Aditya Mallajosyula, Francesca Ferrara, Jessica Flynn, Nigel Temperton, Michael Citron, Xiaoping Liang (June 2014). "Influenza hemagglutinin stem-fragment immunogen elicits broadly neutralizing antibodies and confers heterologous protection". Proceedings of the National Academy of Sciences. 111 (25): E2514–E2523. Bibcode:2014PNAS..111E2514M. doi:10.1073/pnas.1402766111. PMC 4078824. PMID 24927560.
- Kuan Pern Tan, Shruti Khare, Raghavan Varadarajan, Mallur Srivatsan Madhusudhan (2014). "TSpred: a web server for the rational design of temperature-sensitive mutants". Nucleic Acids Res. 42 (Web Server issue): W277-84. doi:10.1093/nar/gku319. PMC 4086094. PMID 24782523.
- Rathore U; Saha P; Kesavardhana S; Kumar AA; Datta R; Devanarayanan S; Das R; Mascola JR; Varadarajan R. (2017). "Glycosylation of the core of the HIV-1 envelope subunit protein gp120 is not required for native trimer formation or viral infectivity". J. Biol. Chem. 292 (24): 10197–10219. doi:10.1074/jbc.M117.788919. PMC 5473224. PMID 28446609.

== See also ==
- Frederic M. Richards
- Immunogen
- Hemeprotein
- Myoglobin
