= Ovandrotone albumin =

Immunogen and vaccine against androstenedione

Combination of
- Ovandrotone: Androstane steroid
- Human serum albumin: Serum protein

Clinical data
- Trade names: Fecundin, Ovastim
- Other names: Polyandroalbumin; GR-33207; Ovandrotone:human serum albumin conjugate
- AHFS/Drugs.com: Monograph

Legal status
- Legal status: US: ℞-only

Identifiers
- CAS Number: 63-05-8
- ChemSpider: None
- UNII: 409J2J96VR

Ovandrotone albumin (INN, BAN) (brand names Fecundin, Ovastim), also known as polyandroalbumin, as well as ovandrotone:human serum albumin conjugate, is an immunogen and vaccine against androstenedione that is used in veterinary medicine to increase the ovulation rate and number of lambs born to ewes. It is a conjugate of ovandrotone (androstenedione-7α-carboxyethylthioether) and human serum albumin. The drug was developed by 1981 and was introduced in Australia and New Zealand in 1983.

Ovandrotone albumin produces transient immunity against androstenedione, and the generation of antibodies against androstenedione presumably decreases circulating levels of androstenedione. This is thought to result in reduced negative feedback on the hypothalamic-pituitary-gonadal axis and increased gonadotropin secretion, which in turn improves fertility and fecundity. Indeed, ovandrotone albumin has been found to significantly increase luteinizing hormone levels throughout the estrous cycle in ewes.

== See also ==
- Androvax
