= Toppur Seethapathy Sadasivan =

Indian plant pathologist

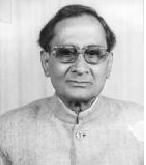
- Born: 22 May 1913; Saidapet, Madras Presidency, British India
- Died: 18 August 2001 (aged 88); Mylapore, Chennai, Tamil Nadu, India
- Education: University of Madras; University of Lucknow; University of London
- Occupation: Plant pathologist
- Known for: Studies in mycology and plant pathology
- Awards: Padma Bhushan; Shanti Swarup Bhatnagar Prize; IBS Birbal Sahni Medal; Birbal Sahni Institute of Palaeobotany Jubilee Medal; INSA Sunder Lal Hora Medal; Birbal Sahni Birth Centenary Medal

Toppur Seethapathy Sadasivan (May 22, 1913 – August 18, 2001) was an Indian plant pathologist, academic and the director of the Centre for Advanced Studies in Botany of the University of Madras. He was the founder of the School of Physiological Plant Pathology at Madras University and was a recipient of the Shanti Swarup Bhatnagar Prize, the highest Indian award in the science category. He was an elected fellow of the Indian Academy of Sciences, Indian National Science Academy and Indian Botanical Society and an elected member of the Academy of Sciences Leopoldina. The Government of India awarded him the third highest civilian honour of the Padma Bhushan, in 1974, for his contributions to science.

== Biography ==
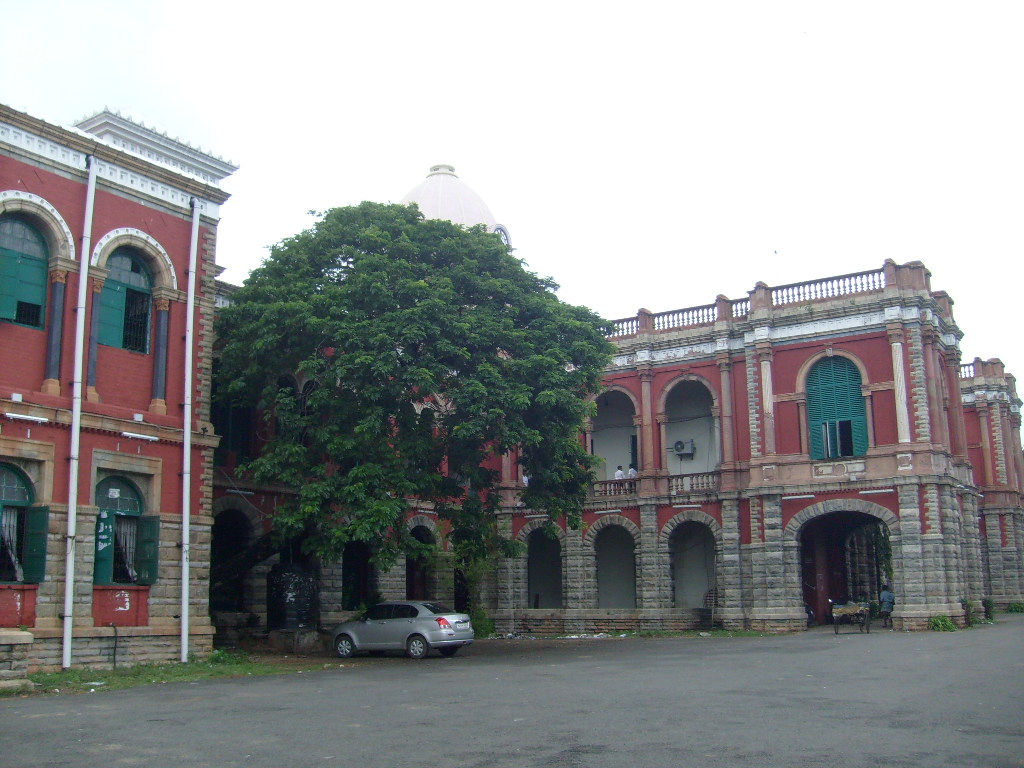
Presidency College, Chennai

Toppur Sadasivan was born on 22 May 1913, at Saidapet, a satellite town in Madras, Madras Presidency, to Kanakammal and her physician husband, Seethapathy, who was the first Indian director of the King Institute of Preventive Medicine and Research. His schooling was at P. S. Senior Secondary School after which he graduated in Botany from the Presidency College, Chennai in 1934. Moving to Lucknow, he secured his master's degree from Lucknow University, studying under the tutelage of Birbal Sahni, a known paleobotanist, and started his doctoral research under S. N. Das Gupta. However, he continued his research at the University of London under the guidance of F. C. Bauwden and S. D. Garret, to secure a PhD in 1940 and worked at the Rothamsted Experiment Station (present-day Rothamsted Research), Harpenden on plant virology and soil mycology for a while before returning to Punjab Agricultural College, Lyallpur (present-day University of Agriculture, Faisalabad) to start his career as a microbiologist, in 1941. Soon, he shifted to the University Botany Laboratory (UBL) of the University of Madras, and took up the position of a Reader, to eventually succeed M. O. P. Iyengar as its Director in 1944, .

At UBL, Sadasivan formed a research group to pursue studies soil-borne diseases affecting cash crops like cotton, pigeonpea and rice which is reported to have assisted in the better understanding of the soil-borne pathogens. He developed several concepts such as competitive saprophytic ability and Rhizosphere effect and these studies were utilized by the Indian taxonomist, C. V. Subramanian, in his classification of Hyphomycetes. His group collectively published over 600 articles to document their research findings. Under his directorship, UBL became a University Grants Commission-accredited Centre for Advanced Study and he mentored 52 doctoral research scholars, including C. V. Subramanian, a Shanti Swarup Bhatnagar Prize recipient, who would later succeed him as the head of the Centre for Advanced Study. He also established the School of Physiological Plant Pathology at Madras University and served as a consultant to the Council of Scientific and Industrial Research (CSIR) on plant-based laboratories.

Sadasivan served as the President of the Indian Academy of Sciences (IAS) from 1971 to 1973 and held other positions at the academy such as Vice-president (1965–70), Secretary (1956–58) and council member (1946–49 and 1956–76). He also sat in the council of the Indian National Science Academy during various terms (1958–59, 1962–64, 1971–73) and was the chairman of the governing council of the Birbal Sahni Institute of Palaeobotany, also serving the institute as the Birbal Sahni Professor from 1977 to 1980. He was the editor of the journal published by the Indian Botanical Society and served as a member of the editorial board of Journal of Phytopathology (Phytopathology Zeitschrift) published from Berlin. He chaired the Botany section of the Indian Science Congress of 1958 and was the vice president of the International Botanical Congress (1959, 1964, 1969 and 1975). When the first International Plant Pathology Congress held in London in 1966, he chaired the convention. He also served as the president of the Indian Phytopathological Society for the year 1964.

Sadasivan was married to Radha and the couple had three daughters. He died on 18 August 2001, at the age of 88, at Gokulam, his residence along Mundagakanniamman Koil Street in Mylapore.

== Awards and honors ==
The Indian Academy of Sciences (IAS) elected him as its fellow in 1945 and the Indian National Science Academy (INSA) followed suit a decade later. In 1960, he was elected as a member of the Academy of Sciences Leopoldina, the same year as he received the Shanti Swarup Bhatnagar Prize, the highest Indian award in the science and technology category, making him the first recipient of the award in the Biological Sciences category. He was also an elected fellow of the Indian Botanical Society and the Indian Phytopathological Society while the University of London conferred on him the degree of Doctor of Science (DSc) in 1955. He received the Birbal Sahni Medal of the Indian Botanical Society in 1962, followed by the Birbal Sahni Institute of Palaeobotany Jubilee Medal in 1971. The Indian National Science Academy awarded him the Sunder Lal Hora Medal in 1973 and the Birbal Sahni Birth Centenary Medal reached him two years before his death in 1999. The Indian National Science Academy has instituted an annual oration, Professor T. S. Sadasivan Endowment Lecture in his honor.

== Trivia ==
Sadasivan was reported to have donated a part of his property in Kodaikanal to Bharatiya Vidya Bhavan for establishing a school where he served as the chairman for nearly fifteen years. He was known to have had a fascination for photography. He wore Khadi and used to wash his own clothes till his health failed a month before his death.

== See also ==
- P. S. Senior Secondary School
- Presidency College, Chennai
- List of Madras University alumni
