= Veerambakkam Srinivasan Ramachandran =

Indian botanist (born 1953)

V.S. Ramachandran
- Born: 1 December 1953 (age 72); Veerambakkam Village, Thiruvannamalai district, Tamil Nadu, India
- Scientific career
- Fields: Angiosperm taxonomy
- Author abbrev. (botany): V.S.Ramach.

Veerambakkam Srinivasan Ramachandran (Prof. V.S. Ramachandran), is a well-known botanist, formerly professor at Department of Botany, Bharathiar University and currently serving as adjunct faculty in the Horticultural College and Research Institute, Tamil Nadu Agricultural University, Coimbatore.

== Career ==
Ramachandran joined as junior research fellow at Botanical Survey of India, Southern Circle, Coimbatore, under the steward leadership of Dr N.C. Nair and got his PhD from University of Madras under the guidance of Dr V.J. Nair, a well-known grass specialist. He served as a professor of botany at Bharathiyar University, Coimbatore and retired in the year 2014. To his credit, he authored three books, namely Flora of Cannanore (1988), Ferns and Fern Allies of the Nilgiris, Tamil Nadu (2017), and Taxonomic Revision of the Lichen Genus Opegrapha sensu lato (Roccellaceae) in India (2018) and edited two books Proceedings of the National Seminar Recent trends in the Conservation and Utilization of Under-Utilized Wild Edible Plants (CUWEP-2009) (2010), and Plant diversity and Conservation (2013). In addition to the above, he published more than 125 research articles in both national and international journals and discovered eight new species.

== Honours and awards ==
- FIAT (Fellow of Indian Association for Angiosperm Taxonomy) in 1992
- FES (Fellow of Ethnobotanical Society) in 1992
- INSA visiting fellowship for college teachers in 1997-1998
