= Narayanaswamy Srinivasan =

Indian molecular biophysicist

- Born: 1 April 1962 (age 64); Chennai, Tamil Nadu, India
- Died: 3 September 2021
- Education: University of Madras; Indian Institute of Science
- Known for: Studies on computational genomics and protein structure analysis
- Awards: 2004 N-BIOS Prize; 2007 Shanti Swarup Bhatnagar Prize
- Scientific career
- Fields: Molecular biophysics
- Workplaces: Indian Institute of Science; University of La Réunion; Birkbeck College; Manchester University; University of Nantes

Narayanaswamy Srinivasan (born 1962) was an Indian molecular biophysicist and a professor and the head of Proteins: Structure, Function and Evolutionary Group (N. S. Group) at the Molecular Biophysics Unit of the Indian Institute of Science. He is known for his researches in the fields of computational genomics and protein structure analysis. An elected fellow of the Indian Academy of Sciences and the National Academy of Sciences, India, he is a J. C. Bose National fellow of the Department of Biotechnology and a recipient of the National Bioscience Award for Career Development of the Department of Science and Technology. The Council of Scientific and Industrial Research, the apex agency of the Government of India for scientific research, awarded him the Shanti Swarup Bhatnagar Prize for Science and Technology, one of the highest Indian science awards, in 2007, for his contributions to biological sciences.

== Biography ==
N. Srinivasan, born on the April Fool's Day of 1962 in Chennai in the south Indian state of Tamil Nadu, graduated in physics from the University of Madras in 1982 and continued at the university to complete his master's degree in biophysics at the Department of Crystallography and Biophysics in 1984. Joining the Indian Institute of Science (IISc), he secured a PhD in 1991 for his thesis, Conformational studies on globular proteins: Data analysis, and served as a senior research fellow at IISc, assisting Padmanabhan Balaram, a noted biochemist and Padma Bhushan recipient. His stint at Balaram's laboratory lasted only 10 months and in October 1991, he moved to the Department of Crystallography at Birkbeck College to work with Tom Blundell and stayed there till 1994 when he shifted his base to Ludwig Institute for Cancer Research where he had the opportunity to work under Mike Waterfield. Two years later, he was reunited with Tom Blundell at the Department of Biochemistry of the University of Cambridge and completed his post-doctoral studies there in May 1998.

Srininvasan returned to India the same year and joined the Indian Institute of Science to serve at the Molecular Biophysics Unit (MBU) as an assistant professor and a senior fellow of the Wellcome Trust. In 2010, he was promoted as a professor and he heads the Proteins : Structure, Function and Evolutionary Group, popularly known as N. S. Group, of the MBU. In between, he served as an honorary research fellow at Birkbeck College from 1998 to 2000 and is a visiting professor at University of La Réunion (since 2004), a senior fellow at Manchester University (since 2008) and a visiting professor of Bioinformatics at University of Nantes (July 2012).

== Legacy ==
Srinivasan's researches were broadly on protein evolution with regard to its structure, functions and interactions. He worked on cellular signal transduction pathways and proteins involved in the process through modeling and computational studies. Deploying computational genomics, he is known to have assisted in identifying similar proteins with shared structural and functional features. His research findings have been published in several articles; (Note: Please see Selected bibliography section) online article repositories such as Google Scholar and ResearchGate have listed 345 and 391 of his articles respectively. He has been granted patents for two of his inventions related to nucleotide sequences. His ongoing project, Multi-macromolecular assemblies, relates to 3-D structures of large macromolecular machines.

Srinivasan is a former member of the committee on Affiliates and Special Interests Group of the International Society for Computational Biology (ISCB) and a member of the Structural Biology and Structural Genomics section of the Faculty of 1000. He is associated with several science journals; as an editorial board member with Bioinformatics, PLoS ONE, F1000 Research, International Journal of Bioinformatics Research and Applications, Research and Reviews in Biosciences, Resonance, In Silico Biology, Scientific World Journal, Biology Direct and Scientific Reports; as an associate editor at International Journal of Knowledge Discovery in Bioinformatics and Bioinformation and as a guest editor with PLoS Computational Biology, Journal of Biosciences, Progress in Biophysics and Molecular Biology and Current Opinions in Structural Biology.(ongoing). He was associated with PRIB 2007, an international conference on Pattern Recognition In Bioinformatics, held in Singapore in 2007 as a member of the program committee and has delivered several featured lectures and keynote addresses which included the Keystone Symposium on Multiprotein Complexes (Cambridge 2006), and Asia-Pacific Bioinformatics Conference (Melbourne 2012). On the academic front, he has served as the thesis examiner for a number of Indian universities (Note: The list includes Punjab University, Chandigarh, University of Kerala, University of Hyderabad, Delhi University, Madurai Kamaraj University, Jadavpur University, Anna University, University of La Réunion, Shanmugha Arts, Science, Technology & Research Academy, Vellore Institute of Technology, Kuvempu University, Macquarie University and Jawaharlal Nehru University) and as the coordinator of integrated doctoral and BS programs in Biology of Indian Institute of Science. He also sits in the Scientific Advisory Board of Jubilant Biosys, a research and development firm involved in drug discovery services.

== Awards and honors ==
The Department of Biotechnology of India awarded Srinivasan the National Bioscience Award for Career Development in 2004. The year 2007 brought him the Shanti Swarup Bhatnagar Prize, one of the highest Indian science awards, as well as the elected fellowship of the Indian Academy of Sciences and the National Academy of Sciences, India. He also holds the Honorary Research Fellowship of Birkbeck College and the International Senior Fellowship of the Wellcome Trust.

== Selected bibliography ==
- Mark S Johnson, Narayanaswamy Srinivasan, Ramanathan Sowdhamini, Tom L Blundell (January 1994). "Knowledge-based protein modeling". Critical Reviews in Biochemistry and Molecular Biology. 29 (1): 1–68. doi:10.3109/10409239409086797. PMID 8143488.
- KG Tina, Rana Bhadra, Narayanaswamy Srinivasan (July 2007). "PIC: protein interactions calculator". Nucleic Acids Research. 35 (2): W473–W476. doi:10.1093/nar/gkm423. PMC 1933215. PMID 17584791.
- Jonas Emsley, Helen E White, Bernard P O'hara, Glaucius Oliva, Narayanaswamy Srinivasan, Ian J Tickle, Tom L Blundell, Mark B Pepys, Steve P Wood (January 1994). "Structure of pentameric human serum amyloid P component". Nature. 367 (6461): 338–345. Bibcode:1994Natur.367..338E. doi:10.1038/367338a0. PMID 8114934. S2CID 4284282.
- Amanda R Walker, Paul A Davison, Agnese C Bolognesi-Winfield, Celia M James, N Srinivasan, Tom L Blundell, Jeffrey J Esch, M David Marks, John C Gray (July 1999). "The TRANSPARENT TESTA GLABRA1 locus, which regulates trichome differentiation and anthocyanin biosynthesis in Arabidopsis, encodes a WD40 repeat protein". The Plant Cell. 11 (7): 1337–1349. doi:10.2307/3870753. JSTOR 3870753. PMC 144274. PMID 10402433.
- Kaushik Hatti, Ashutosh Gulati, Narayanaswamy Srinivasan and M. R. N.Murthy (October 2016). "Determination of crystal structures of proteins of unknown identity using a marathon molecular replacement procedure: structure of Stenotrophomonas maltophilia phosphate-binding protein". Acta Crystallogr. 72 (10): 1081–1089. doi:10.1107/S2059798316012419. PMID 27710929. S2CID 23485225.
- Rakesh Ramachandran, Agnel Praveen Joseph, Ramachandra Moorthy Bhaskara, Narayanaswamy Srinivasan (August 2016). "Structural and mechanistic insights into human splicing factor SF3b complex derived using an integrated approach guided by the cryo-EM density maps". RNA Biology. 13 (10): 1025–1040. doi:10.1080/15476286.2016.1218590. PMC 5056777. PMID 27618338.
- Gayatri Ramakrishnan 14.18 • Indian Institute of Science 2nd Abha Jain 3rd Nagasuma R Chandra 40.79 • Indian Institute of Science 4th Narayanaswamy Srinivasan (December 2016). "Computational recognition and analysis of hitherto uncharacterized nucleotide cyclase-like proteins in bacteria". Biology Direct. 11 (1): 27. doi:10.1186/s13062-016-0130-9. PMC 4886424. PMID 27246835.

== Patents ==
- Sangeetha Hareendran, Nishanth Gabriel, Dwaipayan Sen, Rupali Gadkar, Sudha Govindarajan, Narayana Swamy Srinivasan, Arun Srivastava, Alok Srivastava, Giridhara Rao Jayandharan, Ruchita Selot, Balaji BALAKRISHNAN, Akshaya Krishnagopal (7 November 2013). "Nucleotide sequences, methods, kit and a recombinant cell thereof". Patent : US20130295614 A1.
- Sangeetha Hareendran, Nishanth Gabriel, Dwaipayan Sen, Rupali Gadkar, Sudha Govindarajan, Narayana Swamy Srinivasan, Alok Srivastava, Giridhara Rao Jayandharan, Ruchita Selot, Balaji Balakrishnan, Akshaya Krishnagopal (12 February 2014). "AAV vectors and corresponding nucleotide sequences and methods". Patent : US20140162319. Applicant : Christian Medical College.

== See also ==
- Computational genomics
- Protein structure
- Nucleic acid sequence
