= Journal of Astrophysics and Astronomy =

- Language: English
- Edited by: Annapurni Subramaniam

Publication details
- History: 1980–present
- Publisher: Springer India, Indian Academy of Sciences, and Astronomical Society of India
- Frequency: Bimonthly
- Impact factor: 1.61 (2021)

Standard abbreviations
- ISO 4: J. Astrophys. Astron.

Indexing
- ISSN: 0250-6335 (print); 0973-7758 (web)
- OCLC no.: 909884659

Links
- Journal homepage; Online access

The Journal of Astrophysics and Astronomy is a peer-reviewed scientific journal of astrophysics and astronomy established in 1980. It is co-published bimonthly by Springer India, the Indian Academy of Sciences, and Astronomical Society of India. The journal is edited by Annapurni Subramaniam.

== Indexing and abstracting ==
The journal is abstracted and indexed in the following bibliographic databases:

- Academic Search Premier
- Aerospace Database
- Civil Engineering Abstracts
- Communication Abstracts
- INSPEC
- Metadex
- Science Citation Index Expanded
- Scopus

According to the Journal Citation Reports, the journal has a 2020 impact factor of 1.270.
