= Sādhanā (journal) =

- Discipline: Engineering and applied science
- Language: English
- Edited by: J. H. Arakeri, K. V. S. Hari, R. K. Shyamasundar

Publication details
- Former name(s): Proceedings of the Indian Academy of Sciences Section C
- History: 1978–present
- Publisher: Springer Science+Business Media on behalf of the Indian Academy of Sciences
- Frequency: Monthly
- Open access: Hybrid
- Impact factor: 1.214 (2021)

Standard abbreviations
- ISO 4: Sādhanā

Indexing
- ISSN: 0256-2499 (print); 0973-7677 (web)

Links
- Journal homepage; Online archive

Sādhanā – Academy Proceedings in Engineering Sciences, is a monthly peer-reviewed scientific journal published by Springer Science+Business Media on behalf of the Indian Academy of Sciences. It was established in 1978 and covers all branches of engineering and applied science.

== Abstracting and indexing ==
The journal is abstracted and indexed in several databases including:

- Science Citation Index
- Scopus
- SPIRES
- Inspec
- Zentralblatt MATH
- Chemical Abstracts Service

According to the Journal Citation Reports, the journal had a 2015 impact factor of 0.769.

== See also ==
- Pramana
