= Bulletin of Materials Science =

- Discipline: Materials science
- Language: English
- Edited by: G U Kulkarni

Publication details
- History: 1979-present
- Publisher: Springer Science+Business Media on behalf of the Indian Academy of Sciences (India)
- Frequency: Bimonthly
- Impact factor: 1.8 (2022)

Standard abbreviations
- ISO 4: Bull. Mater. Sci.

Indexing
- CODEN: BUMSDW
- ISSN: 0250-4707 (print); 0973-7669 (web)
- LCCN: 2003209614
- OCLC no.: 7821397

Links
- Journal homepage; Online archive

The Bulletin of Materials Science is a bimonthly peer-reviewed scientific journal that publishes original research articles, review articles and rapid communications in all areas of materials science. It is published by Springer Science+Business Media on behalf of the Indian Academy of Sciences in collaboration with the Materials Research Society of India and the Indian National Science Academy. The editor-in-chief is Prof. Giridhar U Kulkarni (JNCASR).

== Abstracting and indexing ==
The journal is abstracted and indexed in:

- Science Citation Index Expanded
- Scopus
- INSPEC
- Chemical Abstracts Service
- EBSCO databases
- ProQuest
- Academic OneFile
- Academic Search
- ChemWeb
- Current Contents/Engineering, Computing and Technology
- Current Contents/Physical, Chemical and Earth Sciences
- Earthquake Engineering Abstracts
- EI-Compendex
- INIS Atomindex
- International Bibliography of Book Reviews
- International Bibliography of Periodical Literature
- Materials Science Citation Index

According to the Journal Citation Reports, the journal has a 2022 impact factor of 1.8.
