= N. Gautham =

Emeritus Professor

Namasivayam Gautham
- Born: Namasivayam Gautham; 9 July 1955 (age 71)
- Education: Madras Christian College, University of Madras; Maharaja Sayajirao University of Baroda; Indian Institute of Science
- Known for: Studies on DNA Crystallography and the application of Mutually Orthogonal Latin squares technique to Protein structure prediction and molecular docking
- Scientific career
- Fields: DNA Crystallography; Protein structure; Protein structure prediction; Bioinformatics
- Workplaces: University of Madras
- Doctoral advisor: Mysore A. Viswamitra
- Doctoral students: P. Karthe

Namasivayam Gautham (born 1955) is a retired professor emeritus at the Centre of Advance Study in Crystallography and Biophysics, University of Madras. He is known for his work on DNA crystallography, protein structure prediction and molecular docking.

== Education ==
In 1975, Gautham obtained his BSc degree in physics from the Madras Christian College, University of Madras. Later, in 1979 he completed his Master of Science degree in physics from Maharaja Sayajirao University of Baroda. He was awarded a PhD in 1983 for research on the Structural biology of isopropylidene nucleoside derivatives under the supervision of Mysore A. Viswamitra.

== Career and research ==
Gautham worked as a Research associate at the Indian Institute of Science. Following his postdoctoral research, he was appointed as a lecturer at the University of Madras in 1985. He was promoted to a full Professor in 1997. He continued to work at the University of Madras until his retirement in 2016.

Gautham used DNA Crystallography to study the impact of metal ions on the transition of right-handed B-DNA to left-handed Z-DNA. as well as the self assembly of DNA decameric sequences into a four-way Holliday junction In the area of structural bioinformatics, Gautham developed a novel Ab initio computational method using Mutually Orthogonal Latin squares (MOLS) - a technique employed in the area of experimental design - to efficiently sample the conformational space of polypeptides and proteins in order to identify global minimum energy conformations. Later, his laboratory applied the MOLS technique to the problem of molecular docking and produced an open source software package called MOLS.

Gautham has written two textbooks in the field of Biophysics and Bioinformatics. He holds two patents for the development of computational methods for building optimal models of 3-dimensional molecular structures particularly related to peptides and proteins.

Gautham's research has been funded by the Department of Science and Technology (DST), the Department of Biotechnology and the Council of Scientific and Industrial Research.

=== Awards and honours ===
Gautham was elected a Fellow of the National Academy of Sciences, India (FNASc), India in 2007. He was awarded the BOYSCAST Fellowship from DST, India in 1990. He received the Martin Foster Gold Medal in 1983 for Best Thesis in the Division of Physics and Mathematics from the Indian Institute of Science.

== See also ==
- List of protein-ligand docking software
