= Sushil Jajodia =

American computer scientist

- Education: University of Oregon
- Awards: IEEE McDowell Award; IEEE Technical Achievement Award; FISSEA Educator of the Year Award; IEEE Fellow; ESORICS Outstanding Research Award; IFIP WG 11.3 Outstanding Research Contributions Award; ACM SIGSAC Outstanding Contributions Award; VSE Outstanding Research Faculty Award; IFIP TC 11 Kristian Beckman Award
- Scientific career
- Fields: Computer science Computer Security; Cyber Security; Privacy; Network security Databases; Distributed Systems; Mathematics; Algebraic Topology
- Workplaces: George Mason University; National Science Foundation; Naval Research Laboratory; University of Missouri, Columbia; University of Wisconsin, Stevens Point; University of Oklahoma
- Thesis: Low-dimensional CW-complexes with One-relator Fundamental Group (1977)
- Doctoral advisor: Allan J. Sieradski
- Doctoral students: Vijay Atluri
- Website: https://csis.gmu.edu/jajodia

Sushil Jajodia is an American computer scientist known for his work on cyber security and privacy, databases, and distributed systems.

== Career ==
Sushil Jajodia is University Professor, BDM International Professor, and the founding director of Center for Secure Information Systems in the Volgenau School of Engineering at the George Mason University, Fairfax, Virginia. He is also the director of the NSF I/UCRC Center for Cybersecurity Analytics and Automation (now in Phase II). He joined Mason after serving as the director of the Database and Expert Systems Program within the Division of Information, Robotics, and Intelligent Systems at the National Science Foundation. Before that he was the head of the Database and Distributed Systems Section in the Computer Science and Systems Branch at the Naval Research Laboratory, Washington and associate professor of Computer Science and Director of Graduate Studies at the University of Missouri, Columbia. He has also been a visiting professor at the University of Milan, Italy; Sapienza University of Rome, Italy; Isaac Newton Institute for Mathematical Sciences, Cambridge University, England; King's College, London, England; Paris Dauphine University, France; and Imperial College, London, England. He received his PhD from the University of Oregon, Eugene.

== Research ==
Sushil Jajodia's research interests include security, privacy, databases, and distributed systems. He has authored or coauthored seven books, edited 53 books and conference proceedings, and published more than 500 technical papers in the refereed journals and conference proceedings. A complete list of his publications can be found here. Five of his books have been translated in Chinese. He is also a holder of 23 patents. His research has been sponsored by both government and industry.

== Ph.D. Graduates ==
Dr. Jajodia has supervised 27 doctoral dissertations. Nine of these graduates hold tenured positions at U.S. universities; four are NSF CAREER awardees, one is DoE Young Investigator awardee, and one is a Fulbright Scholar. Two additional students are tenured at foreign universities. For his academic genealogy, go to Sushil Jajodia - The Mathematics Genealogy Project (mathgenealogy.org).

== Awards ==
- IFIP TC 11 Kristian Beckman Award (1996)
- Volgenau School of Engineering Outstanding Research Faculty Award (2000)
- ACM SIGSAC Outstanding Contributions Award (2008)
- IFIP WG 11.3 Outstanding Research Contributions Award (2011)
- IEEE Fellow (2013)
- ESORICS Outstanding Research Award (2015)
- Federal Information Systems Security Educators’ Association (FISSEA) Educator of the Year Award (2016)
- IEEE Computer Society Edward J. McCluskey Technical Achievement Award (2016)
- IEEE Computer Society W. Wallace McDowell Award (2020)
- ACM Fellow 2021
- IFIP Fellow 2021

He was recognized for the most accepted papers at the 30th anniversary of the IEEE Symposium on Security and Privacy. His h-index is 107 and Erdos number is 2.

== Professional Service ==
Dr. Jajodia has served in different capacities for various journals and conferences. He is the founding consulting editor of the Springer International Series on Advances in Information Security, and a member of the editorial board of Springer Cybersecurity, Springer Journal of Banking and Financial Technology, and SpringerBriefs in Computer Science. He was the founding editor-in-chief of the Journal of Computer Security (1992–2010) and a past editor of IEEE Transactions on Computers (2016–2019), ACM Transactions on Information and Systems Security (1999–2006), IET Information Security (2007–2014), International Journal of Cooperative Information Systems (1992–2011), IEEE Concurrency (1997–2000), and IEEE Transactions on Knowledge and Data Engineering (1989–1991). He has been named a Golden Core member for his service to the IEEE Computer Society, and received International Federation for Information Processing (IFIP) Silver Core Award "in recognition of outstanding services to IFIP" in 2001. He is a past chair of the ACM Special Interest Group on Security, Audit, and Control (SIGSAC), IEEE Computer Society Technical Committee on Data Engineering, and IFIP WG 11.5 on Systems Integrity and Control.

== Home Page ==
The URL for his home page is http://csis.gmu.edu/jajodia.
