= Mangalore Anantha Pai =

Indian electrical engineer

- Born: 5 October 1931; Karnataka, India
- Died: 2 March 2023 (aged 91); Irvine, California, U.S.
- Education: University of Madras; University of California, Berkeley
- Known for: Studies on power system stability, analysis and security
- Awards: 1974 Shanti Swarup Bhatnagar Prize
- Scientific career
- Fields: Power engineering
- Workplaces: Brihanmumbai Electric Supply and Transport; University of California, Berkeley; University of California, Los Angeles; IIT Kanpur; University of Illinois at Urbana–Champaign; Memorial University of Newfoundland; Iowa State University; Pacific Northwest National Laboratory

Mangalore Anantha Pai (5 October 1931 – 2 March 2023) was an Indian electrical engineer, academic and a professor emeritus at the University of Illinois at Urbana–Champaign. A former professor of electrical engineering at the Indian Institute of Technology, Kanpur, he is known for his contributions in the fields of power stability, power grids, large scale power system analysis, system security and optimal control of nuclear reactors and he has published 8 books and several articles. Pai is the first India-born scientist to be awarded a PhD in electrical engineering from the University of California, Berkeley.

Pai was an IEEE Life Fellow and was an elected fellow of the Indian National Science Academy, Indian Academy of Sciences, and Indian National Academy of Engineers and an elected and life fellow of the Institute of Electrical and Electronics Engineers The Council of Scientific and Industrial Research, the apex agency of the Government of India for scientific research, awarded him the Shanti Swarup Bhatnagar Prize for Science and Technology, one of the highest Indian science awards for his contributions to Engineering Sciences in 1974. (Note: Long link - please select award year to see details)

== Biography ==
Mangalore Anantha Pai born on 5 October 1931 in the south Indian state of Karnataka, did his graduate studies in electrical engineering at the University of Madras and after completing the course in 1953, started his career as an electrical engineer at the Electric Supply Department of Brihanmumbai Electric Supply and Transport, then known as Bombay Electric Supply and Transport (BEST) Undertaking. After a service of 4 years, he moved to the US in 1957 where he completed his master's degree in electrical engineering (MS) at University of California, Berkeley in 1958 and continued at the institution to secure a PhD in 1961. Subsequently, he joined the university as an assistant professor at University of California, Berkeley (1961–62) before taking up Professorship at University of California, Los Angeles (UCLA) in 1962. At UCLA, he had the opportunity to work with Eliahu I. Jury, a Rufus Oldenburger laureate on discrete time systems, and in 1963 he returned to India to join the Electrical Engineering department of the Indian Institute of Technology, Kanpur as an assistant professor. He served the institute till 1981 during which period he held the positions of an associate professor from 1966 to 1969 and a professor thereafter till he went back to the US as a visiting professor at University of Illinois at Urbana–Champaign in 1981. He also had a stint as a consultant to the Uttar Pradesh Power Corporation Limited from 1971 to 1979. After two years of service as a visiting faculty at Illinois, he became a regular professor in 1983 and served out his academic career to superannuate in 2003. In between, he also served as a visiting professor at the Memorial University of Newfoundland and Iowa State University and visited India on a CSIR-UNDP program at Central Power Research Institute. Post-retirement, Illinois University made him an emeritus professor. He also serves as a consultant to Pacific Northwest National Laboratory, advising them on Model Reduction and Dynamic Security of Power System. Pai died in Irvine, California on 2 March 2023, at the age of 91.

== Legacy ==
Pai's early researches were based on power system stability, security and model reduction and his work on Model Reduction of Large-Scale Power Systems has been reported to be of significance to field of power systems. He is known to have introduced Lyapunov's method in researches on power system stability and energy functions. Introduction of computer applications in power systems is another of his contributions and a power system software he has developed is in use with several power distribution networks. Later, he worked on Smart Grid, Microgrid and Renewable Energy and how they could be integrated into the main electrical grid of a power system; earlier, at IIT Kanpur, he encouraged research on Control and Power. He has also contributed in the field of industrial consultancy and has served as a member of the editorial boards of Power and Energy series of Springer.

In 1963, Pai was selected to join IIT Kanpur as one of the earliest member of the Electrical Engineering faculty. Under the guidance of economist John Kenneth Galbraith, IIT Kanpur became the first institute in India to offer Computer science education. The earliest computer courses were started at IIT Kanpur in August 1963 on an IBM 1620 system, which was flown from Princeton to Kanpur. The initiative for computer education came from the Electrical engineering department. An intense outreach program in Computer Education was established during his time at IIT Kanpur. It was during his years at IIT Kanpur, Pai published his first book, Computer Techniques in Power System Analysis. His second book, Power System Stability: Analysis by the Direct Method of Lyapunov, was also published before he moved to US in 1981. This was followed by five more authored books, Com Tech In Power Sys Ana, Power System Dynamics and Stability, Power Circuits and Electromechanics, Energy Function Analysis for Power System Stability and Small Signal Analysis of Integrated Power Systems, the last one published in 2016. In between, he co-edited an Oxford University Press festschrift on Homi J. Bhabha titled Homi Bhabha and the Computer Revolution, which was featured in the Indian edition of MIT Technology Review in May/June 2011. He has also contributed chapters to books published by others and has authored over 125 peer-reviewed articles; (Note: Please see Selected articles section) the online article repository of Indian Academy of Sciences has listed 107 of them. He is reported to have helped organize two symposia of International Federation of Automatic Control in India and has delivered keynote or invited speeches at several science seminars in India and abroad including the Seminar on Voltage Instability in Power Network organized by the Delhi chapter of the Institute of Electrical and Electronics Engineers in 1991. He has also mentored a number of doctoral scholars in their studies.

=== Books ===
- M. A. Pai (1979). Computer Techniques in Power System Analysis. Tata McGraw-Hill. ISBN 978-0-07-096551-5.
- M. A. Pai (1 January 1981). Power System Stability: Analysis by the Direct Method of Lyapunov. North-Holland Publishing Company. ISBN 978-0-444-86310-2.
- Pai (1 October 2005). Com Tech In Power Sys Ana. Tata McGraw-Hill Education. ISBN 978-0-07-059363-3.
- Peter W. Sauer; M. A. Pai (2006). Power System Dynamics and Stability. Stipes Publishing L.L.C. ISBN 978-1-58874-673-3.
- M. A. Pai (2010). Power Circuits and Electromechanics. Stipes Pub Llc. ISBN 978-1-60904-009-3.
- R.K. Shyamasundar; M.A. Pai, eds. (2011). Homi Bhabha and the Computer Revolution. Oxford University Press. p. 300. ISBN 978-0198072461.
- Anantha Pai (6 December 2012). Energy Function Analysis for Power System Stability. Springer Science & Business Media. ISBN 978-1-4613-1635-0.
- M. A. Pai; K. R. Padiyar (28 June 2016). Small Signal Analysis of Integrated Power Systems. Alpha Science International Limited. ISBN 978-1-78332-268-8.

=== Chapters ===
- Biswa Nath Datta (6 December 2012). Applied and Computational Control, Signals, and Circuits: Recent Developments. Springer Science & Business Media. pp. 181–. ISBN 978-1-4615-1471-8.
- Joe H. Chow (1 May 2013). Power System Coherency and Model Reduction. Springer New York. ISBN 978-1-4614-1802-3.
- Savu Savulescu (10 July 2014). Real-Time Stability in Power Systems: Techniques for Early Detection of the Risk of Blackout. Springer. pp. 1–. ISBN 978-3-319-06680-6.

=== Selected articles ===
- Nguyen, T. B.; Pai, M. A.; Hiskens, I. A. (2000). "Direct computation of critical clearing time using trajectory sensitivities". 2000 Power Engineering Society Summer Meeting (Cat. No.00CH37134). Vol. 1. pp. 604–608. doi:10.1109/PESS.2000.867655. ISBN 0-7803-6420-1. S2CID 110085952.
- Chaniotis, D.; Pai, M. A.; Hiskens, I. (2001). "Sensitivity analysis of differential-algebraic systems using the GMRES method-application to power systems". ISCAS 2001. The 2001 IEEE International Symposium on Circuits and Systems (Cat. No.01CH37196). Vol. 2. pp. 117–120. doi:10.1109/ISCAS.2001.921260. ISBN 0-7803-6685-9. S2CID 17064410.
- Nguyen, T. B.; Pai, M. A.; Hiskens, I. A. (2002). "Sensitivity approaches for direct computation of critical parameters in a power system". International Journal of Electrical Power & Energy Systems. 24 (5): 337–343. Bibcode:2002IJEPE..24..337N. doi:10.1016/S0142-0615(01)00050-3.
- Chaniotis, D.; Pai, M. A. (2003). "A new preconditioning technique for the GMRES algorithm in power flow and P-V curve calculations". International Journal of Electrical Power & Energy Systems. 25 (3): 239–245. Bibcode:2003IJEPE..25..239C. doi:10.1016/S0142-0615(02)00034-0.
- Soman, S. A.; Nguyen, T. B.; Pai, M. A. (2004). "Analysis of angle stability problems: a transmission protection systems perspective". IEEE Transactions on Power Delivery. 19 (3): 1024–1033. doi:10.1109/TPWRD.2004.824417. S2CID 14210340.

== Awards and honors ==
The Council of Scientific and Industrial Research awarded Pai the Shanti Swarup Bhatnagar Prize, one of the highest Indian science awards in 1974. The Indian Academy of Sciences elected him as a fellow in 1979 and he became an elected fellow of the Indian National Science Academy in 1980. The Institute of Electrical and Electronics Engineers elected him as a fellow in 1986; IEEE honored him again in 1996 with life fellowship. He is also an elected fellow of the Indian National Academy of Engineers. The Electrical and Computer Engineering (ECE) department of the University of Illinois organized a day-long felicitation event, PaiFest, in his honor on 15 October 2015 at the department. The event included a symposium where a number of his students and colleagues such as William H. Sanders, Peter W. Sauer, Ian Hiskens, Bernie Lesieutre, Marija D. Ilić, Kash Khorasani and Vijay Vittal presented papers and Pai himself made a presentation titled, From Lyapunov to Krylov – My Research Journey. In 2014, IIT Kanpur honored him with the Institute Fellow award.

== See also ==
- Lyapunov stability
- Hopf bifurcation
