= Srinivasan Varadarajan =

Indian chemist (1928–2022)

- Born: 31 March 1928; Tamil Nadu, India
- Died: 11 May 2022 (aged 94)
- Education: Madras University (MA, MSc), Andhra University (MA, MSc), University of Delhi (PhD), University of Cambridge (PhD)
- Occupations: Chemist; Corporate executive Civil servant
- Awards: Padma Bhushan

Srinivasan Varadarajan (31 March 1928 – 11 May 2022) was an Indian chemist, civil servant, corporate executive and the former chairman of several public sector undertakings such as Indian Petrochemicals Corporation Limited (IPCL), Petrofils Cooperative Limited, Engineers India Limited (EIL), and Bridge and Roof Company (India).

== Education ==
Varadarajan hailed from Tamil Nadu. He obtained two master's degrees (MA and MSc) from Madras University and Andhra University and two doctoral degrees (Ph.D.) from University of Delhi and University of Cambridge. He worked as a faculty member at several educational institutions such as Delhi University (1949–53), Massachusetts Institute of Technology (1956–57) and Department of Radiotherapeutics and University of Cambridge (1957–59).

== Awards ==
The Government of India awarded him the third highest civilian honour of the Padma Bhushan in 1985 for his contributions to society.

He was an elected fellow of the Indian National Science Academy (1983), Indian Academy of Sciences (1972) and The World Academy of Sciences (1997).

== See also ==
- List of University of Delhi people
- List of Madras University alumni
- List of University of Cambridge people
