= Arunachala Sreenivasan =

Indian nutritionist (1909–1996)

- Born: 13 July 1909; Tamil Nadu, India
- Died: 20 July 1996 (aged 87); India
- Occupation: Food technologist
- Known for: Food technology Nutritional science
- Awards: Padma Bhushan

Arunachala Sreenivasan (1909–1996) was an Indian food technologist, nutritional scientist and the director of Cancer Research Institute of the Tata Memorial Centre, Mumbai. Born on 13 July 1909 in Tamil Nadu and after receiving the degree of Doctor of Science from the University of Madras in 1936, he served in various positions such as deputy director of Central Food Technological Research Institute, (1959–64), head of Biochemistry and Food Technology Division of Bhabha Atomic Research Centre, (1964–71), adviser at the Department of Atomic Energy, and as the emeritus scientist of BARC (1971–73), before superannuating from Tata Memorial Centre in 1975. He was an elected Fellow of the Indian National Science Academy and his research findings have been documented by way of several articles. The Government of India awarded him the third highest civilian honour of the Padma Bhushan, in 1974, for his contributions to science. Sreenivasan died on 20 July 1996 at the age of 87.

== See also ==
- List of Madras University alumni
