= Pakkiriswamy Chandra Sekharan =

Indian forensic expert, writer

- Born: 15 April 1934; Nagapattinam, Tamil Nadu, India
- Died: 11 July 2017 (aged 83)
- Occupation: Forensic expert
- Known for: investigation of the assassination of Rajiv Gandhi
- Awards: Padma Bhushan (2000)

Pakkiriswamy Chandra Sekharan (15 April 1934 – 11 July 2017) was an Indian forensic expert, writer and a former director of the Department of Forensics Sciences of the Government of Tamil Nadu. He was best known for his contributions in the investigations in the Rajiv Gandhi assassination case.

Born on 15 April 1934 at Nagapattinam, a coastal town in the south Indian state of Tamil Nadu, Chandra Sekharan secured his graduate and post-graduate degrees from Annamalai University and did doctoral research to obtain a PhD in forensic science from the University of Madras in 1986. He was the president of the Forensics International and has published several articles on the subject of forensics, including Studies on certain forensic aspects of skull identification and individualization, and Forensic science--as is what is and a monograph, Lip forensics : forensic cheiloscopy for crime investigation and criminal identification : labial structure for personal appearance identification and personal identification. The Government of India awarded him the third highest civilian honour of the Padma Bhushan, in 2000, for his contributions to society.

Chandra Sekharan died on 11 July 2017, following a brief illness.

== Awards and honors ==
State honors:

- Padma Bhushan, India's third highest civilian honor (2000)

== See also ==
- Assassination of Rajiv Gandhi
- List of Madras University alumni
