= P. Karthe =

Indian structural biologist

- Born: India
- Known for: Studies in structural biology and drug design
- Awards: 2010 N-BIOS Prize
- Scientific career
- Fields: Structural biology
- Workplaces: University of Madras
- Doctoral advisor: N. Gautham

Ponnuraj Karthe is an Indian structural biologist and a professor and the head of the Department of Crystallography and Biophysics of the University of Madras. He is known for his research in the fields of structural biology and drug designing. His studies have been documented by way of a number of articles (Note: Please see Selected bibliography section) and Google Scholar, an online repository of scientific articles has listed 46 of them. Besides, he has contributed chapters to books edited by others and has delivered invited speeches at many seminars which include the Workshop on Advances in Computer Aided Drug Design held in August 2010 at the University of Madras. He was a member of the national organizing committee of the Annual Conference of Indian Biophysical Society - Molecular Architecture, Dynamics and Assem, organized by Saha Institute of Nuclear Physics and serves as a member of the national committee of the International Union for Pure and Applied Biophysics (IUPAB) as well as the executive council of the Bioinformatics and Drug Discovery Society (BIDDS), a non governmental organization promoting dissemination of knowledge in the fields of bioinformatics, biological sciences and other life sciences. The Department of Biotechnology of the Government of India awarded him the National Bioscience Award for Career Development, one of the highest Indian science awards, for his contributions to biosciences, in 2010.

== Selected bibliography ==
=== Chapters ===
- M. Vijayan; A. S. Kolaskar (1999). Perspectives in Structural Biology: A Volume in Honour of G.N. Ramachandran. Universities Press. pp. 8–. ISBN 978-81-7371-254-8.

=== Articles ===
- Dileep, Kalarickal V.; Tintu, Ignatius; Mandal, Pradeep K.; Karthe, Ponnuraj; Haridas, Madathilkovilakathu; Sadasivan, Chittalakkottu (1 January 2012). "Binding to PLA2 May Contribute to the Anti-Inflammatory Activity of Catechol". Chemical Biology & Drug Design. 79 (1): 143–147. doi:10.1111/j.1747-0285.2011.01258.x. ISSN 1747-0285. PMID 21995306.
- Kumarevel, Thirumananseri; Fujimoto, Zui; Karthe, Ponnuraj; Oda, Masanao; Mizuno, Hiroshi; Kumar, Penmetcha K.R (2004). "Crystal Structure of Activated HutP". Structure. 12 (7): 1269–1280. doi:10.1016/j.str.2004.05.005. PMID 15242603.
- Karthe, P.; Gautham, N.; Kumar, Anil; Katti, S. B. (1997). "The Three-Dimensional Structure of 3′-Deoxycytidine". Nucleosides and Nucleotides. 16 (1–2): 1–10. doi:10.1080/07328319708002516.

== See also ==
- Catechol
- Histidine utilizing Protein
