= Pramana (journal) =

Indian physics journal from 1973

- Discipline: Physics
- Language: English
- Edited by: Umesh Waghmare

Publication details
- History: 1973–present
- Publisher: Springer Science+Business Media on behalf of the Indian Academy of Sciences
- Frequency: Continuous Article Publication
- Open access: Hybrid
- Impact factor: 2.669 (2021)

Standard abbreviations
- ISO 4: Pramana

Indexing
- CODEN: PRAMCI
- ISSN: 0304-4289
- LCCN: 74929509
- OCLC no.: 01797824

Links
- Journal homepage; Online archive

Pramana – Journal of Physics, was launched in July 1973. Pramana (which in Sanskrit means "source of valid knowledge, a standard") is the outcome of a nationwide effort by Indian physicists to disseminate their best efforts in physics. The journal is published by the Indian Academy of Sciences in collaboration with the Indian National Science Academy and the Indian Physics Association.

The journal presents refereed papers covering current research in physics, both original contributions---research papers, brief reports or rapid communications---and invited reviews. Pramana also publishes special issues devoted to advances in specific areas of Physics.

Pramana – Journal of Physics is now distributed in print outside India and online worldwide by Springer, co-publisher of the journal together with the Indian Academy of Sciences. On Springer, Pramana – Journal of Physics is part of SpringerLink, one of the world's leading interactive databases of high quality STM journals, book series, books, reference works and online archives collection.

Pramana is published in e-only mode from Jan 2020 onwards. All content is freely available/downloadable without charge from the journal web page on the IASc website .

== See also ==
- Indian Journal of Physics
- Sādhanā
