= Natchimuthuk Gopalswamy =

Indian American Solar Physicist

Natchimuthu Gopalswamy
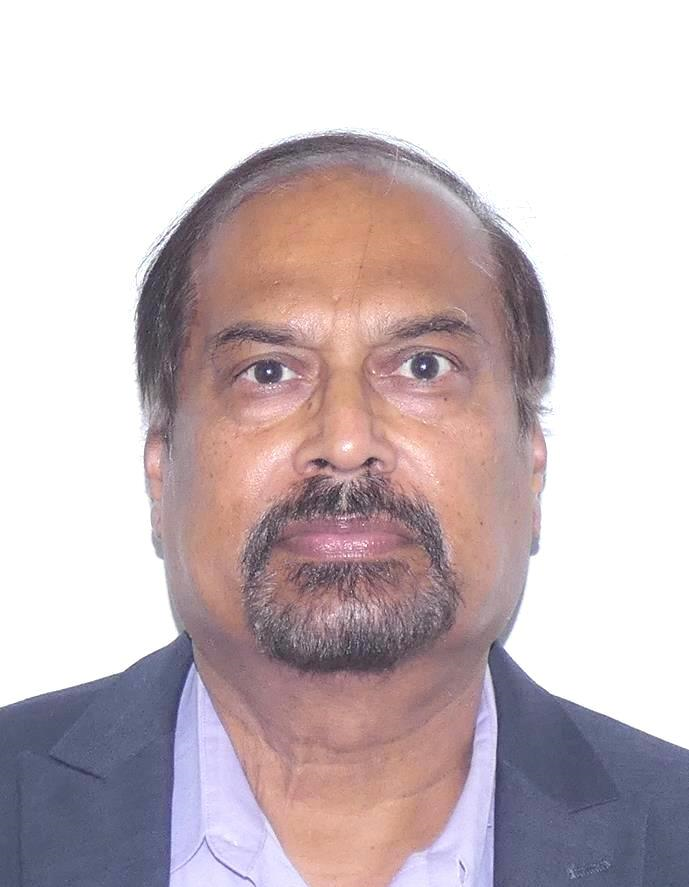
- Dr Natchimuthu Gopalswamy
- Born: V. Chandrapuram, Coimbatore, Tamil Nadu, India
- Citizenship: India (1954–1998); United States (1998–present)
- Education: PSG College of Arts and Science (University of Madras), Indian Institute of Science (IISc)
- Years active: 1977 - Present
- Organization: National Aeronautics and Space Administration (NASA)
- Known for: Exceptional contributions in the field of solar eruptions and their space weather consequences
- Parent(s): Kuyilamal (mother) and Nachimuthu(father)
- Awards: Fellow of the International Science Council, 2022; Lifetime achievement award; Elavenil-Indian Science and Technology Association, 2021; AGU/SPA Richard Carrington Award 2019, NASA’s John C. Lindsay Memorial Award for Space Science 2017; AGU Fellow, 2016; others
- Scientific career
- Fields: Solar Physics, Solar Terrestrial Physics, Radio Physics of the Sun
- Workplaces: NASA The Catholic University of America University of Maryland Kodaikanal Solar Observatory Indian Institute of Astrophysics
- Doctoral advisor: Som Krishan
- Website: https://science.gsfc.nasa.gov/sed/bio/natchimuthuk.gopalswamy-1

Dr Natchimuthu "Nat" Gopalswamy is an Indian American Solar physicist. He is currently a staff scientist at the Heliophysics Division of NASA’s Goddard Space Flight Center.

== Background and scientific career ==
Gopalswamy completed a BSc and MSc in physics at the University of Madras in 1975 and 1977, respectively. These were followed by a PhD at the Indian Institute of Science in 1982. He took up research positions at the Indian Institute of Astrophysics, Bengaluru, working on radio observations of the Sun at the Kodaikanal Solar Observatory. In 1985 he moved to the University of Maryland, working on solar radio bursts, before moving to NASA Goddard Space Flight Center in 1997, with a joint research professor position at Catholic University of America. He focused on coronal mass ejections (CMEs) and the relation to solar radio bursts.

== Research interests ==
Gopalswamy's primary research interest is solar eruptive phenomenon and their relation to radio bursts and energetic particles. His early work included observations of CMEs. More recently, he worked with the Large-angle and Spectrometric Coronagraph (LASCO) aboard the Solar and Heliospheric Observatory (SOHO) spacecraft. He currently maintains the widely used catalogue of LASCO-observed CMEs, which has allowed the link between the approximately 11-year solar cycle and CMEs to be better understood. During the 2017 solar eclipse, he led a team making spectroscopic measurements of the solar corona. He is the PI of The Balloon-Borne Investigation of Temperature and Speed of Electrons in the Corona (BITSE), and the Co-I of Solar Terrestrial Relations Observatory (STEREO) WAVES, and Sun Earth Connection Coronal and Heliospheric Investigation (SECCHI) white-light coronagraph COR1 instruments.

== Outreach activities ==
Gopalswamy is the Executive director of the International Space Weather Initiative (ISWI) since 2013. He initiated the SCOSTEP Visiting Scholar (SVS) program in 2015 while president of the Scientific Committee on Solar-Terrestrial Physics (SCOSTEP) in 2015.

== Professional societies ==
- 1986–Present : Member of the American Geophysical Union (AGU)
- 1986–Present: Member of the American Astronomical Society (AAS),
- 2004–Present: Member, Distinguished Lecturer, Session convener of the Asia Oceania Geosciences Society (AOGS)
- 1983–Present : Life Member of the Astronomical Society of India (ASI)
- 1985–Present : Member, Commission chair of the International Astronomical Union (IAU)
- 2011–Present : Member of the Japan Geophysical Union (JpGU)

== Awards and honors ==
Gopalswamy has received several awards and honors, some of which are listed below:

- 2022 Fellow of the International Science Council
- 2019 Doctor Honoris Causa, Bulgarian Academy of Sciences
- 2019 American Geophysical Union Richard Carrington Award
- 2016 Elected American Geophysical Union Fellow
- 2011 Scientific Committee on Solar-Terrestrial Physics (SCOSTEP) President
- 2010 Asia Oceania Geosciences Society (AOGS) Distinguished Lecturer, 2010
- 2009 Elected president of International Astronomical Union Commission 49 (interplanetary plasma and heliosphere)
- 2007 Associate editor for Geophysical Research Letters
- 2006 Editorial board for Sun and Geosphere
- 2000 Associate editor of Journal of Geophysical Research (Space Physics)
- 1996 Elected fellow of the Science and Technology Agency of Japan
