= Resonance (journal) =

- Discipline: Science education
- Language: English
- Edited by: B Sury (2022)

Publication details
- History: 1996–present
- Publisher: Springer Science+Business Media on behalf of the Indian Academy of Sciences (India)
- Frequency: Monthly

Standard abbreviations
- ISO 4: Resonance

Indexing
- ISSN: 0971-8044 (print); 0973-712X (web)
- OCLC no.: 746947926

Links
- Journal homepage; Online archive

Resonance – Journal of Science Education is a monthly peer-reviewed academic journal covering science education. It is currently being published by Springer Science+Business Media on behalf of the Indian Academy of Sciences and the editor-in-chief is Prof. B Sury. The journal was established in 1996.

== Abstracting and indexing ==
The journal is abstracted and indexed in:

- CSA Environmental Sciences
- EBSCO databases
- Indian Science Abstracts
- ProQuest databases
- Scopus
- Emerging Sources Citation Index
