= Subramaniula =

Scientific classification
- Kingdom: Fungi
- Division: Ascomycota
- Class: Sordariomycetes
- Order: Sordariales
- Family: Chaetomiaceae
- Genus: Subramaniula; Arx

Type species
- Subramaniula thielavioides (Arx, Mukerji & N. Singh) Arx

Genus of fungi

Subramaniula is a genus of fungi within the Chaetomiaceae family.
