= C. K. Gandhirajan =

Indian police officer

Dr. C.K Gandhirajan I.P.S PPMG, PPM
- செ. கி. காந்தி ராஜன்
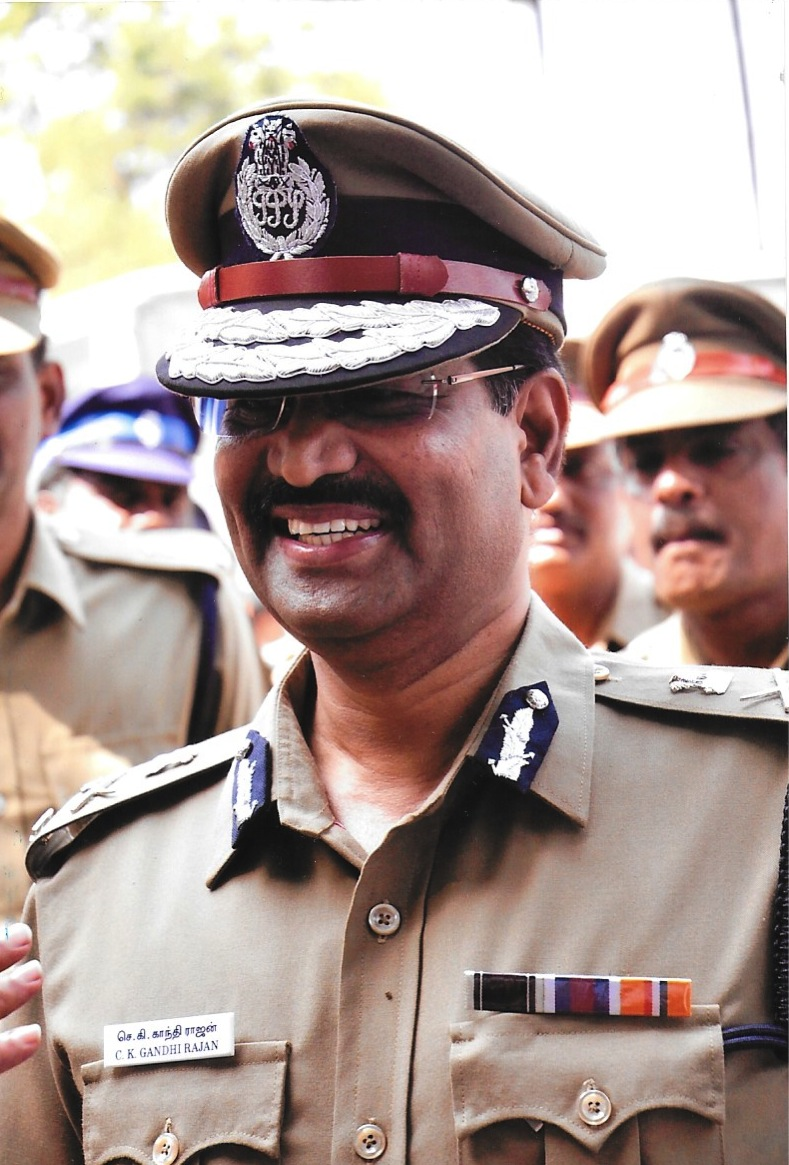
- Police career
- Department: Indian Police Service
- Rank: Director general of police
- Awards: Presidents Police Medal for Gallantry; Presidents Police Medal for Meritorious Service. 50th Anniversary Independence Medal

C. K. Gandhirajan

Director General of Police – fire, rescue, emergency services, Tamil Nadu
- Incumbent
- Assumed office 1 March 2019

Director General of Police – SHRC, Tamil Nadu
- In office 7 October 2017 – 28 February 2019

Additional Director General of Police – TNPTC, Tamil Nadu
- In office 13 June 2016 – 7 October 2017

Additional Director General of Police – Enforcement, Tamil Nadu
- In office 1 November 2010 – 13 June 2015

Inspector General of Police – Headquarters, Tamil Nadu
- In office 1 July 2008 – 31 October 2010

Personal details
- Born: Tiruvallur district, Tamil Nadu
- Education: University of Madras, Chennai (BSc); University of Madras, Chennai (MSc); University of Madras, Chennai (PhD); Sardar Vallabhbhai Patel National Police Academy, Hyderabad (IPS)

Dr. C. K. Gandhirajan is a retired Indian Police Service (IPS) Officer of the 1985 batch belonging to the Tamil Nadu cadre. Hailing from Thiruvallur District, he served as the Director General of Police, Fire, Rescue and Emergency Services in Tamil Nadu. He obtained a PhD. in criminology from the University of Madras. He is the author of two books, Organized Crime and Inside Prisons.

== Early life and education ==
C.K. Gandhirajan did his schooling in the Thiruvallur District of Tamil Nadu. He majored in chemistry at the University of Madras. He holds a doctorate for his thesis on "organized crime" from the University of Madras. He is interested in subjects like Community policing, organized crime, juvenile delinquency, and police training.

== Career ==
C.K. Gandhirajan joined the IPS as a member of the 1985 batch. He did his training at the National Police Academy, Hyderabad. After serving as Assistant Superintendent of Police, he was promoted to Superintendent of Police in 1989 and served in the Dharmapuri, Erode, and Chengalpattu East Districts. He was appointed as the Deputy Commissioner of Police in the Washermanpet area of Chennai. In 1999, he was promoted to Deputy Inspector General of Police and served in the Chennai Range, armed police, training, and railways. He was promoted to the rank of Inspector General of Police on October 22, 2005, and served in Operations and Intelligence before being posted as The Commissioner of Police, Coimbatore City. He was promoted to Additional Director General of Police on 1 November 2010, where he headed the Enforcement and Tamil Nadu Police Transport Corporation.

== Asaithambi Encounter, 1996 ==
Asaithambi was a notorious gangster in the 1990s, prominent in the underworld of North Chennai. He was involved in kidnapping, extortion and contract killing.

When he extended his criminal activities throughout the city, the government of Tamil Nadu commissioned a special team, Operation Asai, headed by then Chennai Superintendent of Police C.K. Gandhirajan.

On July 30, 1996, Gandhirajan and his team gunned down Asaithambi and his gang in front of Loyola College, Chennai. Gandhirajan was awarded the President's Police Medal for Gallantry for his actions.

The year 1996 is considered the first encounter in Chennai city limits.

== Ranks held ==
Indian Police Service
| Insignia | Rank | Date Acquired |
|---|---|---|
| | Additional Director-General of Police – ADGP | 2010 |
| | Inspector-General – IG | 2005 |
| | Deputy Inspector-General – DIG | 2000 |
| | Superintendent of Police – SP | 1990 |
| | Assistant Superintendent of Police – ASP | 1988 |

== Awards and honours ==
- As Superintendent of Police, Gandhirajan was awarded the President's Police Medal for Gallantry (PPMG)for an encounter with a criminal in Chennai in 2000. The medal is equivalent to the Queen's Police Medal (QPM) which is awarded to police officers in the United Kingdom and Commonwealth of Nations.
- As Additional Director General of Police, Gandhirajan was awarded the President's Police Medal for Distinguished Service (PPM) on 28 August 2013

== Teaching and training experience ==
1. He has organized training programs and delivered several lectures on Organized Crime, Community Policing, Computer Crimes and Juvenile Delinquency at the Police Training College in Chennai to Police Officers across various levels.
2. He is also a guest faculty for M.A. Criminology at the Madras University.
3. A detailed study has been conducted on criminal gangs in Chennai City for thesis research in the Department of Criminology University of Madras. The study deals with notorious organized criminal gangs. This study concentrated on the gang's organizational structure, their modus operandi and the socio-economic condition of the members of these gangs.

== Thesis submitted ==
1. In the 26th All India Criminology Conference held at the University of Madras in December 2002, he participated and presented a paper on the Empirical Study on Organized Crime.
2. Participated and presented a paper on Crime Risk Reduction: Multi-Dimensional Approach at a National Seminar on Crime Prevention organized by the Indian Society of Criminology at Madras University on 10 September 2002.
3. Participated and presented a paper on Crime Prevention at a seminar organized by the Institute of Criminological Research Education and Services on 30 October 1999 at Jaya College of Arts and Science at Chennai.
4. As a member of the Organizing Committee, he organized an All India Criminology Conference at the Madras University in collaboration with the Indian Society of Criminology from 26 to 28 December 2002

== Bibliography ==
He is the author of two books, Organized Crime and Inside Prisons.

1. Organized Crime was published by A.P.H. Publishing Corporation, New Delhi, in 2003. The book has a foreword written by the Retired Director General of Police, V. R. Lakshmi Narayanan. The book was reviewed in The Hindu on 23 December 2003.
2. Inside Prisons was published by Manimekhalai Prasuram, T.Nagar, Chennai in 2007. The book has a foreword by Former Supreme Court Justice V.R. Krishna Iyer, who writes that the book "has made a substantial contribution to penalogical practice and literature."

== Publications ==
- Mapping Criminal Gangs in Chennai City: Indian Journal of Criminology, Volume 30, January and July 2002 Nos. 1 & 2.
- Literature on Organized Crime in the CID Review, Vol. II, June 2002 Issue 6.
- Public Participation in Crime Prevention in the CID, Review Vol. II October 2002 Issue 10.
- Journey to Crime: Spatial Behaviors of Criminal Gangs in Chennai City – 'Indian Police Journal', Volume. 3 July to September 2003 Edition.
