= Musa sabuana =

Scientific classification
- Kingdom: Plantae
- Clade: Embryophytes
- Clade: Tracheophytes
- Clade: Spermatophytes
- Clade: Angiosperms
- Clade: Monocots
- Clade: Commelinids
- Order: Zingiberales
- Family: Musaceae
- Genus: Musa
- Species: M. sabuana

Binomial name
- Musa sabuana K.Prasad, A.Joe, Bheem. & B.R.P.Rao

Species of flowering plant

Musa sabuana is a species of banana first described by K.Prasad, A.Joe, Bheem., & B.R.P.Rao. It is a member of the genus Musa.

== Range ==
It was first identified in the area of the Panchavati and Ramakrishnapur Dam in the Andaman Islands. It is found in the Middle and Little Andamans.
