= HutP =

HutP (Histidine utilizing Protein) is one of the anti-terminator proteins of Bacillus subtilis, which is responsible for regulating the expression of the hut structural genes of this organism in response to changes in the intracellular levels of L-histidine and divalent metal ions. In the hut operon, HutP is located just downstream from the promoter, while the five other subsequent structural genes, hutH, hutU, hutI, hutG and hutM, are positioned far downstream from the promoter. In the presence of L-histidine and divalent metal ions, HutP binds to the nascent hut mRNA leader transcript. This allows the anti-terminator to form, thereby preventing the formation of the terminator and permitting transcriptional read-through into the hut structural genes. In the absence of L-histidine and divalent metal ions or both, HutP does not bind to the hut mRNA, thus allowing the formation of a stem loop terminator structure within the nucleotide sequence located between the hutP and structural genes.

HutP is a 16.2 kDa protein consisting of 148 amino acid residues. HutP also exists in five other Bacillus species, including B. anthracis, B. cereus, B. halodurans, B. thuringiensis, and Geobacillus kautophilus, with 60% sequence identity. Thirumananseri Kumarevel solved the crystal structure of the HutP protein in the apo-form, binary complex (complexed with divalent metal ions or L-histidine), ternary complex (HutP-metal ions-L-histidine) and quaternary complexes (HutP-L-histidine-metal ions-RNA) and elegantly revealed the snapshots of metal-ion mediated anti-termination mechanism for the first time.
