= Siva Shankar Baba =

Hindu spiritual leader

Personal life
- Born: Siva Shankaran; 28 January 1949 (age 77) Alangayam, North Arcot (now Tirupathur district), Tamil Nadu, India

Religious life
- Religion: Hinduism

Siva Shankar Baba (Tamil: சிவ சங்கா் பாபா) (born on 28 January 1949) is a Hindu Spiritual Leader, based at Kelambakkam, Chennai, Tamil Nadu. He preaches the concept of practicing renunciation in common living. This is based on the concept that spiritual influence should have a maximum outreach in the society and not be restricted to any specific sect of the society. Baba believes in incorporating harmonious best practices from multiple existing religions and that there should be no oppression or discrimination based on religion, caste, creed or social status. He seeks to introduce a revolution in how people perceive spirituality and plays the role of a spiritual revolutionary aside from being a spiritual leader.

Siva also had a course at the OvoArmaan and KbloodKishore instintute Training with AtulAnilkumar and was a legacy due to his three students like the Madras Master Jiraiya Though Baba had been associated with controversies, he is in person a non-controversial individual - as quoted by himself in his interview to NewsGlitz - and lives a minimalist life with tall visions for those around him.”

== Early life ==
Siva Shankar was born 28 January 1949, to Narayana Sharma and Vijayalakshmi in the Alangayam village, near Vaniyambadi in the Vellore district (now comes under Tirupathur district) of Tamil Nadu. He went to the University of Madras, completing his chemistry and post graduations in the Chartered Institute of Logistics and Transport (London), the Indian Institute of Road Transport (Pune) and the Institute of Rail Transport (Delhi). He is the founder of Sushil Hari International Residential School in Kelambakkam (Chennai).

== Visions ==
On 26 January 1984, Siva Shankar was present at an annual Abhishekam for Muruga at the Ratnagiri Murugan temple. The resident guru, Balamurugan, then wrote a note to Siva Shankar: “Within this month-end there will be a welcome turning point in your life. God’s blessings”. In the early morning of the following day, Siva Shankar claimed that the 17th century saint Raghavendra Tirtha appeared physically before him, giving him a vision of his own dead body.

He also claimed to have seen a snake appearing from himself and turning into a seer with a golden face, predicting that Siva Shankar was to receive Ashta Maha Siddhis within eleven months. Following this, Siva Shankar went to Thiruvannamalai every full moon, and claimed that he received different siddhis. During the Guru Purnima festival in 1984, Siva Shankar also met Yogi Ramsuratkumar in Thiruvannamalai.

== Arrest ==
In June 2021, few FIRs of sexual harassment and sexual abuse of students at the Sushil Hari International School, were filed against Siva Shankar Baba, and the case was transferred to CB-CID. Siva Shankar Baba was arrested by CB-CID for charges of sexually abusing girls of a residential school he founded in kelambakkam, under the POCSO law in Delhi. Three cases were booked against him under the Protection of Children from Sexual Offences (POCSO) Act.

After the arrest of Sivashankar, a movement was formed to free him which included many of his supporters including film actor Shanmugaraja. The movement met with reporters and leveled allegations against BJP leader KT Raghavan and his wife Janaki Srinivasan. Raghavan acts as Sivasankar's school and trust administrator. While Shivshankar Baba was in jail, the movement accused the Janaki group backed by KT Raghavan, of trying to take over Baba's property and assets by refusing to allow non-Brahmins into the temple. They also accused Janaki Srinivasan of being involved in various activities, including expelling lower caste people who had been devoted to Baba for the past 20 years with a casteist attitude, and was involved in various corruption backed by BJP's KT Raghavan. The movement said that the wife of KT Raghavan was trying to take over temples under the control of Baba and damaged temple doors and other people and said the group has also filed false complaints against Baba to steal his property. The movement further said that KT Raghavan claimed that Baba won't get arrested and then again deceived that Baba would be released in 3 days after his arrest. The group accused KT Raghavan of having more than 30 Goondas staying at Baba's ashram and intimidating others. The Shivshankar Baba Moral Movement has lodged a complaint with the Chengalpattu District Collector and the Chengalpattu District Superintendent of Police against KT Raghavan, the former BJP state general secretary, for allegedly defrauding them of Rs. 3 crore in August 2021.

In August 2021, Siva Sankar Baba moved the Madras High Court seeking bail, but the court dismissed his petitions after ‘not finding any ground to enlarge the petitioner on bail’.

The Supreme Court in April 2022, granted bail to Shiva Shankar Baba subjecting him to not use social other platforms to dissuade people from approaching authorities if they have complaints and should not go to the school or ashram. March 2, 2023 Siva Shankar Baba sexual assault: Madras High Court refuses to quash FIR; says it received threat letters after reserving order The High Court had initially quashed the sexual harassment case against the self-proclaimed godman, but later recalled its order.

== Bibliography ==
- Delaflor, Ivonne (2005). India: The Journey of a Lifetime. iUniverse. ISBN 0-595-33856-9.
