= Srikanth Balachandran =

India executive

- Born: Tamil Nadu, India
- Citizenship: India
- Education: Madras University; Institute of Chartered Accountants of India
- Occupations: Director, Bharti Enterprises

Srikanth Balachandran is an Indian business executive who serves as a director of Bharti Enterprises. He had earlier served as CFO and CHRO of Bharti Airtel, one of India's largest mobile operators.

== Education ==
Srikanth has an undergraduate degree in commerce from Madras University. He qualified as a Chartered Accountant in November 1984.

== Career ==
Srikanth joined Hindustan Unilever Limited (HUL), a FMCG company in 1985. He worked in Unilever for 23 years taking positions including vice president, finance & commercial and head, and global finance transformation at Unilever's head office in London.

In 2008, he joined Bharti Airtel as the CFO. In 2011, he took over the role of global CFO overseeing the financials of Airtel's operations across 17 countries. In August 2015, he became the CHRO of Airtel. In September 2018, Srikanth relocated to London to take up a director role with the Bharti Enterprises group.
