= Vijay Atluri =

Indian computer scientist

- Born: Vijayalakshmi Atluri; 1956 (age 69–70)
- Education: Jawaharlal Nehru Technological University, Kakinada; IIT Kharagpur; George Mason University
- Scientific career
- Fields: Computer science, information systems security, database management
- Workplaces: Acharya Nagarjuna University; Andhra University; Rutgers Business School – Newark; University of the People
- Thesis: Concurrency Control in Multilevel Secure Databases (1994)
- Doctoral advisor: Sushil Jajodia

Vijayalakshmi Atluri (born 1956) is an Indian computer scientist specialized in information systems security and database management. She is a professor of management science and information systems at Rutgers Business School – Newark. Atluri is an advisory board member of the computer science department at the University of the People.

== Education ==
Atluri completed a Bachelors of Technology in Electronics and Communications Engineering at Jawaharlal Nehru Technological University, Kakinada in May 1977. She earned a Masters of Technology in Electronics and Communications Engineering (Controls and Automation) from IIT Kharagpur in June 1979. Atluri graduated in May 1994 with a Ph.D. in Information Technology at George Mason University. Her dissertation was titled Concurrency Control in Multilevel Secure Databases. Her doctoral advisor was Sushil Jajodia.

== Career ==
Atluri was a lecturer at Acharya Nagarjuna University from August 1980 to December 1982 and again from December 1983 to March 1985. She was a lecturer at Andhra University from December 1982 to December 1983. From March 1985 to August 1990, she was an assistant professor in the department of electronics and communication and computer engineering at Nagarjuna University.

Atluri was a research assistant in the center for secure information systems at George Mason University from August 1990 to August 1994.

Atluri joined the faculty of the management doctorate program at Rutgers Business School – Newark in October 1996. Atluri was an assistant professor from July 1995 to June 2001 and an Associate professor from July 2001 to June 2006. She became a professor in the management science and information systems department in July 2006. Atluri teaches courses in database management, computer information systems, information systems security, electronic commerce, computer architecture, and computer languages.

In 2010, she joined the advisory board of the computer science department of the University of the People.

Atluri was a computer scientist at the National Institute of Standards and Technology Information Technology Laboratory, Computer Security Division, Systems & Network Security Group from February 2007 to February 2011. From September 2011 to September 2013, she became a program director in the National Science Foundation Division of Information and Intelligent Systems, Information Integration and Informatics and Secure and Trustworthy Cyberspace.

== Awards and honors ==
In 1996, she won a National Science Foundation CAREER Award. In 2022, she was elected an ACM Distinguished Member.

== Selected works ==
- Atluri, Vijay; Jajodia, Sushil; George, Binto (2000). Multilevel Secure Transaction Processing. Springer US. ISBN 978-0-7923-7702-3.
