= Vijayalakshmy K. Gupta =

Dr Vijayalakshmy K Gupta Former Member, TRAI

Personal details
- Born: 26 December 1951 Mumbai
- Occupation: Civil Servant

Dr. Vijayalakshmy K Gupta (born 26 December 1951) joined Indian Defence Accounts Service in 1974 through the Civil Services Examination conducted by the Union Public Service Commission. She retired as Secretary Defence Finance, Ministry of Defence Government of India. She served as a full-time member of the Telecom Regulatory Authority of India from 4 March 2013 to 3 March 2016.

== Career ==
Gupta served in the Indian Defence Accounts Service, where she held various positions including that of Secretary Defence Finance. She was the Principal Adviser(Finance) Organizing Committee Commonwealth Games from September 2005 to November 2008. She served as Additional Secretary, Ministry of Women and Child Development from November 2008 to September 2009. She was a Member Finance Telecom Commission from September 2009 till March 2011.

As Secretary Defence Finance, Gupta has been involved at the policy-making level in the development of the architecture for fast and transparent adoption of modern weapons and platforms. She was awarded Colonel Pyara Lal Gold Medal for the Best Thesis in the 39th National Defence College (NDC) Course on Defence and Industry Interface in R&D and Production for Achieving Self Reliance in Military Hardware/Software. Her Thesis highlighted many ways to increase indigenous content in Defence R&D and Production.

In the Ministry of Defence, she directly contributed to formulation, scrutiny and finalisation of high value proposals for modernisation of Defence Forces and provision of amenities to the troops. Her area of interest was in strengthening Internal Audit due to commitment to highest standards of probity, transparency and accountability in public spending.

Gupta's interest in women's issues is reflected in the topic of her PhD thesis: "Human Rights of Women in the Backdrop of Constitutional Guarantees vis-à-vis Implementing Mechanisms". She worked on the project gendering human development indices that culminated in the Report: "Gendering Human Development Indices: Recasting the Gender Development Index and the Gender Empowerment Measure for India" (2009) in collaboration with the Indian Institute of Public Administration. She was a member of GSMA mWomen Working Group in Mobile World Congress, 2014 held in Barcelona where she presented "Sanchar Shakti Project: A Scheme for Mobile Connectivity and ICT Related Livelihood Skills for Women"

She edited and released a book 'Ananya' on the occasion of Women’s Day on 8 March 2009, in collaboration with the National Institute of Design, Ahmedabad. This book documented the journey of the Indian women with a special focus on the girl child.

She initiated pilot projects under the aegis of the Universal Service Obligation Fund to provide mobile telephone connectivity to women’s self-help groups (SHG) and then training the SHGs to run mobile handset and modem repair centres and solar based mobile charging centres in rural areas, with active participation of mobile telephone manufacturers and other stakeholders as part of Corporate Social Responsibility. Dr. Gupta was the chairperson of the Inter Ministerial Committee for auctioning of the 3G and Broadband Wireless Access Spectrum which involved 183 rounds of bidding across service areas. The e-auction was a benchmark auction yielding a revenue of three times the estimated amount. Supreme Court has upheld the Broadband Wireless Access Auction.
