= Indian Botanical Society =

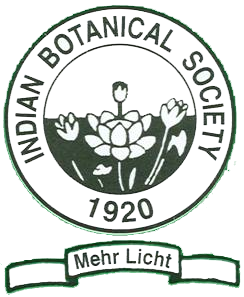
IBS Logo

The Indian Botanical Society (IBS) is the national learned society for botanists of India. It was founded in 1920.

The Society's activities include lectures, symposia, field excursions, field projects and an annual society meeting for exchange of information between botanists working in different areas.

== Origin ==
The Indian Botanical Society had its inception in a resolution passed by the Botany Section of the Indian Science Congress at the Nagpur meeting in January, 1920. A Committee of organisation was consequently formed to carry this resolution into effect. This Committee consisted of the late Dr. P. Bruhl of the University College of Science, Calcutta, the late Rai Bahadur K. Rangachariar of the Agricultural College, Coimbatore, the late Rai Bahadur Prof. Shiv Ram Kashyap of the Government College, Lahore, the late Prof. Birbal Sahni, then of the Banaras Hindu University, Varanasi, Dr. W. Burns, then of the College of Agriculture, Poona and the late Dr. Winfild Dudgeon of the Ewing Christian College, Allahabad, with Dr. Dudgeon as Chairman.

In October 1920, the Committee sent out a letter to as many botanists as could be located in India, inviting them to become Charter Member of the new Society. It was agreed that 25 members would be considered sufficient for founding the Society and that office bearers should be elected when this number was reached. The response to this invitation was so immediate and hearty that it was possible to hold elections for office bearers of the Society by about the middle of November. Upon completion of the election on December 6, 1920 the Society was declared duly organised, and the Committee of organization ceased to exist.

Indian botanical Society holds its Annual session in any University of the country where scientists/ Botanists/ present their views on resent advances in the subject. Thirty fifth session of IBS is scheduled at Vadodara during 8–10 December. The Maharaja Sayajirao University of Baroda is hosting this conference. Young Botanists and Women scientist will be awarded in the conference.

== Publications ==
The Journal of Indian Botany (later The Journal of the Indian Botanical Society), was launched under Professor Fyson's initiative.

== See also ==
- Botanical Survey of India
- Indian Association for Angiosperm Taxonomy
- Flora of India
- Indian Botanic Garden
