= Indian Association for Angiosperm Taxonomy =

Indian organisation

The Indian Association for Angiosperm Taxonomy (IAAT) was established in 1990. The IAAT is headquartered at the Department of Botany, Calicut University, Kozhikode, India. The IAAT is affiliated with the International Association for Plant Taxonomy. It promotes Angiosperm taxonomy in India and acts as a gathering organisation for angiosperm taxonomists.

== Publication ==
The IAAT publishes a journal Rheedea (named after Hendrik van Rheede).
