= Indian Academy of Sciences =

Learned society of sciences in India

- Established: 1934; 92 years ago
- Founder: C. V. Raman
- President: Raghavan Varadarajan
- Location: Bengaluru, Karnataka, India; 13°00′52″N 77°34′48″E
- Website: www.ias.ac.in

The Indian Academy of Sciences, Bengaluru was founded by Indian Physicist and Nobel Laureate C. V. Raman, and was registered as a society on 27 April 1934. Inaugurated on 31 July 1934, it began with 65 founding fellows. The first general meeting of Fellows, held on the same day, elected Raman as president, and adopted the constitution of the Academy.

== Objectives ==
The aims of the Academy are to:

- Promote progress in pure and applied branches of science.
- Encourage important research in various branches of science.
- Represent the scientific work of India internationally.
- Publish work relating to scientific research initiated by the Academy, Provincial Academies, Universities and Government Scientific Institutions.
- Organise meetings of Committees and Conferences to discuss papers submitted to the Academy.
- Advise Government and other bodies on scientific and other matters referred to the Academy.

== Publications ==
The first issue of the Academy Proceedings appeared in two sections in July 1934. They were split into two in July 1935 – one part devoted to physical sciences and the other to life sciences. In 1973 the Academy's publications were further split into several journals aimed as specific scientific disciplines.

Since 1978 the Academy has published a monthly research journal called Sādhanā — Academy Proceedings in Engineering Sciences. The journal covers all branches of Engineering Science. Sādhanā is distributed in print outside India and online worldwide by Springer.

Since 1996 the Academy has published a monthly journal called Resonance – Journal of Science Education. Aimed generally at undergraduates, it also contains some material for junior and senior academic levels. Each issue focuses on the life and work of a famous scientist. It incorporates articles reviewing new books and classics.

The Academy publishes 12 Journals, viz., Resonance, Journal of Biosciences, Journal of Astrophysics and Astronomy, Journal of Genetics, Journal of Earth System Science, Sādhanā, Pramana – Journal of Physics, Proceedings of Mathematical Sciences, Journal of Chemical Sciences, Bulletin of Materials Science, DIALOGUE: Science, Scientists, and Society, and Indian Academy of Sciences Conference Series.

== Project Lifescape ==
Aimed at enriching scientific education, the Academy launched Project Lifescape in collaboration with the Centre for Ecological Sciences at the Indian Institute of Science to spread biodiversity literacy. It aims to involve school and college students in obtaining first-hand information on the status of, and ongoing changes in, ecological habitats of a set of species of considerable human significance. An objective of the project is to publish illustrated accounts of 1500 Indian species of micro-organisms, plants and animals. The accounts would also include ancillary information on the distribution, ecology and behaviour of the species.

The project has published three books, Butterflies of Peninsular India, Freshwater Fishes of Peninsular India, and Amphibians of Peninsular India. A fourth, Dragonflies and Damselflies of Peninsular India is available in electronic format, freely downloadable from the project website.

== The Raman Chair ==
The Government of India instituted the Raman Chair in 1972 to commemorate the memory of the founder of the Academy. Eminent scientists are invited by the Council of the Academy to occupy the Chair, for periods of between six weeks and six months.

== Science education activities ==
The Academy sponsors and conducts two-week Refresher Courses for selected teachers from across India. It awards annual Summer Research Fellowships to talented teachers and students to work with Academy Fellows on research-oriented projects in various research centres across India. It conducts Lecture Programmes at schools and universities on various research topics.

== Members of the Council (2025 to 2027) ==
- Raghavan Varadarajan (President)
- Umesh V. Waghmare (Previous President)
- Swagata Dasgupta (Vice-President)
- Vikram Jayaram (Vice-President)
- Ram Sagar (Vice-President)
- Ramgopal V. Rao (Vice-President)
- Balasubramanian Gopal (Secretary)
- Gaiti Hasan (Secretary)
- V.A. Raghunathan (Treasurer)
- Amita Aggarwal
- Sharmila A. Bapat
- Arup Bose
- Maneesha S. Inamdar
- Jaya N. Iyer
- Devang V. Khakhar
- G. Mugesh
- Syed W.A. Naqvi
- G.V.R. Prasad
- Anil K. Tripathi
- K. Vijayamohanan Pillai

== Presidents ==
The list of presidents of the academy.

| Image | Name | Tenure |
|---|---|---|
| | C. V. Raman | 1934–1970 |
| | T. S. Sadasivan | 1971–1973 |
| | M. G. K. Menon | 1974–1976 |
| | Satish Dhawan | 1977–1979 |
| | Srinivasan Varadarajan | 1980–1982 |
| | S. Ramaseshan | 1983–1985 |
| | Obaid Siddiqi | 1986–1988 |
| | C. N. R. Rao | 1989–1991 |
| | Roddam Narasimha | 1992–1994 |
| | Palle Rama Rao | 1995–1997 |
| | Narendra Kumar | 1998–2000 |
| | Krishnaswamy Kasturirangan | 2001–2003 |
| | T. V. Ramakrishnan | 2004–2006 |
| | Dorairajan Balasubramanian | 2007–2009 |
| | Ajay K. Sood | 2010–2012 |
| | Dipankar Chatterji | 2013–2015 |
| | Ramakrishna Ramaswamy | 2016–2018 |
| | Partha P Majumder | 2019–2021 |
| | Umesh V. Waghmare | 2022–2024 |
| | Raghavan Varadarajan | 2025 to present |

== See also ==
- National Academy of Sciences, India
- Indian National Science Academy
