= Immunogen =

Antigen/epitope that induce immune response

An immunogen is any substance that generates B-cell (humoral/antibody) and/or T-cell (cellular) adaptive immune responses upon exposure to a host organism. Immunogens that generate antibodies are called antigens ("antibody-generating"). Immunogens that generate antibodies are directly bound by host antibodies and lead to the selective expansion of antigen-specific B-cells. Immunogens that generate T-cells are indirectly bound by host T-cells after processing and presentation by host antigen-presenting cells.

An immunogen can be defined as a complete antigen which is composed of the macromolecular carrier and epitopes (determinants) that can induce immune response.

An explicit example is a hapten. Haptens are low-molecular-weight compounds that may be bound by antibodies, but cannot elicit an immune response. Consequently, the haptens themselves are nonimmunogenic and they cannot evoke an immune response until they bind with a larger carrier immunogenic molecule. The hapten-carrier complex, unlike free hapten, can act as an immunogen and can induce an immune response.

Until 1959, the terms immunogen and antigen were not distinguished.

== Used carrier proteins ==
- Keyhole limpet hemocyanin

It is copper-containing respiratory protein, isolated from keyhole limpets (Megathura crenulata). Because of its evolutionary distance from mammals, high molecular weight and complex structure it is usually immunogenic in vertebrate animals.

- Concholepas concholepas hemocyanin

(also blue carrier immunogenic orotein) It is alternative to KLH isolated from Concholepas concholepas. It has the similar immunogenic properties as KLH but better solubility and therefore better flexibility.

- Bovine serum albumin

It is from the blood sera of cows and has similarly immunogenic properties as KLH or CCH. The cationized form of BSA (cBSA) is highly positively charged protein with significantly increased immunogenicity. This change possesses a greater number of possible conjugated antigens to the protein.

- Ovalbumin

Also known as egg albumin, OVA is the main protein (60-75%) found in hen egg white. OVA is soluble in dimethyl sulfoxide (DMSO), which enables the conjugation of haptens that are not soluble in aqueous buffers. The immune response can be enhanced using an adjuvant injected together with the immunogen.

== Immunological adjuvants ==
An adjuvant (from Latin adiuvare – to help) is any substance, distinct from antigen, which enhances immune response by various mechanisms: recruiting of professional antigen-presenting cells (APCs) to the site of antigen exposure; increasing the delivery of antigens by delayed/slow release (depot generation); immunomodulation by cytokine production (selection of Th1 or Th2 response); inducing T-cell response (prolonged exposure of peptide-MHC complexes [signal 1] and stimulation of expression of T-cell-activating co-stimulators [signal 2] on the APCs' surface) and targeting (e. g. carbohydrate adjuvants which target lectin receptors on APCs). Adjuvants have been used as additives to improve vaccine efficiency since the 1920s. Generally, administration of adjuvants is used both in experimental immunology and in clinical settings to ensure a high quality/quantity memory-enhanced antibody response, where antigens must be prepared and delivered in a fashion that maximizes production of a specific immune response. Among commonly used adjuvants are complete and incomplete Freund's adjuvant and solutions of aluminum hydroxide or aluminum phosphate.
