= Narender K. Sehgal =

Indian physicist, scientific administrator and science populariser

- Born: November 7, 1940
- Died: September 7, 2020 (aged 79)
- Citizenship: Indian
- Education: University of Wisconsin–Madison
- Awards: Kalinga Prize (1991)
- Scientific career
- Fields: Particle physics
- Workplaces: Bhabha Atomic Research Centre; Somali National University; Department of Science and Technology (India)
- Thesis: Strange particle production in P̄d annihilations in flight (1960)

Narender K. Sehgal (7 November 1940 - 7 September 2020) was an Indian physicist, scientific administrator, and science populariser. He was born in Lahore (now in Pakistan). He worked as Scientific Officer in the Theoretical Reactor Physics Division of Bhabha Atomic Research Centre. In 1963 he went to US for his MSc and PhD in particle physics from the University of Wisconsin–Madison. He became professor of physics at the Somali National University in Magadiscio, East Africa. He returned to India in 1978 as visiting scientist at the Space Applications Centre (SAC) of Indian Space Research Organisation (ISRO). In 1982 he joined the Department of Science and Technology of the Government of India. He was head of the National Council for Science and Technology Communication (NCSTC) and later Vigyan Prasar, where he remained until his retirement in 2000.

In 1991 Narendar K. Sehgal was awarded the UNESCO Kalinga Prize for the Popularization of Science "for his contribution to the promotion of the integrity and accessibility of scientific knowledge, and propagating the scientific and technological culture to the broadest possible base."

== Early life and education ==
Narendar K. Sehgal was born in 1940 in Lahore, now the capital city of Punjab in Pakistan. He was educated at his hometown. He excelled in academics. He won merit scholarship in matriculation in 1956, using which he entered Punjab University. He graduated with BSc in physics in 1960, winning one of the top ten merit certificates of the university. He immediately joined the Atomic Energy Establishment's (now known as Bhabha Atomic Research Centre's) Training School from where he completed a one-year postgraduate course in physics in August 1961. He was appointed Scientific Officer (a first-class officer rank) in the Theoretical Reactor Physics Division of BARC, where he worked for two years. In 1963 he found an opportunity to join the University of Hawaiʻi at Mānoa in Honolulu, in United States, from where he obtained his MSc in particle physics in 1965. He enrolled for PhD in University of Wisconsin–Madison, and earned his doctoral degree in 1969.

== Career ==
Narendar K. Sehgal continued his research in Indian universities. He turned to scientific journalism and published a quarterly Scientific Opinion from Jalandhar in August 1972. He also served as contributor to Nature journal in London. He continued for four years until he was appointed professor of physics at Somali National University in 1976. After two years he got appointment in 1978 at the Space Applications Centre (SAC) of ISRO in Ahmedabad as a visiting scientist. In February 1982, he joined the Department of Science and Technology, India. He became Director of the newly established the National Council for Science and Technology Communication (NCSTC), and later of Vigyan Prasar. He was also Adviser to the Government of India in the Department of Science and Technology. He remained in this post until his retirement in November 2000.

== Achievements ==
Narendar K. Sehgal was the main force behind several science programmes in India. He introduced science communication programmes such as Bharat Jan Vigyan Jatha of 1987, the annually held National Children's Science Congress (since 1993), radio serials including Vigyan Vidhi (Methods of Science) and Manav Ka Vikas (Human Evolution) which were broadcast respectively during 1989-90 and 1991–94, and television serials such as Kyon Aur Kaise (12 episodes) and Kudratnama (27 episodes). He was also instrumental in the origin of National Science Day (February 28), formation of the All India People's Science Network in 1988, and the NCSTC Network in 1990. He was chief editor of the bilingual (Hindi and English) monthly newsletters NCSTC Communications, from 1988 to November 2000, and Dream-2047, from its inception in 1998 to November 2000. He was also actively involved in debunking the Ganesha milk miracle incident in 1995.

== Awards and recognition ==
- UNESCO Kalinga Prize for the Popularization of Science in 1991
- Honorary Fellow of the Indian Science Writers’ Association in 1993

== Bibliography ==
- Sehgal, Narendar K. (2005). The Changing Role of Science Centres and Museums in Developing Countries. Daya Publishing House. ISBN 978-81-7035-379-9.
- Sehgal, Narendar K.; Sangwan, Satpal; Mahanti, Subodh (2000). Uncharted Terrains: Essays on Science Popularisation in Pre-independence India. Vigyan Prasar. ISBN 978-81-7480-056-5.
- Sehgal, Narendar K.; Bhattacharya, Sandip (1999). Total Solar Eclipse Answers To All Your Questions. Vigyan Prasar. ISBN 978-81-7480-053-4.
- Sehgal, Narendar K. (1997). Memoirs of Ruchi Ram Sahni Pioneer of Science Popularisation in Punjab. Vigyan Prasar. ISBN 978-81-7480-016-9.
