= India Science =

Indian science channel

- Logo
- Type: Science channel
- Country: India
- Stations: Doordarshan
- Headquarters: India

Programming
- Language(s): Hindi, English

Ownership
- Parent: Department of Science and Technology

History
- Founded: 2019
- Launched: 15 January 2019

Links
- Website: www.indiascience.in

India Science is an internet-based science OTT television channel launched in 2019 as part of an initiative of the Department of Science and Technology (DST), Govt of India. The channel is managed and operated by Vigyan Prasar (VP), an autonomous organization of the DST, and is dedicated to science and technology related subjects.

== Overview ==
The launch of the channel was announced along with DD science, a science television series, in an event held in Delhi, India on 15 January 2019. The announcement was made by The Department of Science and Technology along with Doordarshan and was supported by the National Council of Science and Technology Communication (NCSTC). India Science is a multi-language science channel including Hindi and English.
