= Scientific temper =

Form of free thinking

The term scientific temper is broadly defined as "a modest open-minded temper—develop new light, new knowledge, new experiments, even when their results are unfavourable to preconceived opinions and long-cherished theories." It is a way of life (defined in this context as an individual and social process of thinking and acting) which uses the scientific method and which may, consequently, include questioning, observing physical reality, testing, hypothesizing, analyzing, and communicating (not necessarily in that order). Discussion, argument and analysis are vital parts of scientific temper. It aims to inculcate the values of scientific thinking, appreciate scientific development, and drive away superstition, religious bigotry, and all forms of pseudo-science.

== Development of Scientific Temperament in World ==
Scientific temper as a notion existed for a long time, and the origin of the term is unknown. The exact terminology became frequently used in the mid-19th century. A Jesuit scholar Thomas Aloysius Hughes gave a short definition in 1893, saying, "A scientific temper... means a scrupulous and rigid exactness... [which] is the outcome of exact science."

In his Conway Memorial Lecture in 1922, Bertrand Russell used the example of Albert Einstein to explain the meaning of scientific temper:

We have had in recent years a brilliant example of the scientific temper of mind in the theory of relativity and its reception by the world. Einstein, a German-Swiss-Jew pacifist, was appointed to a research professorship by the German Government in the early days of the War; his predictions were verified by an English expedition which observed the eclipse of 1919, very soon after the Armistice. His theory upsets the whole theoretical framework of traditional physics; it is almost as damaging to orthodox dynamics as Darwin was to Genesis. Yet physicists everywhere have shown complete readiness to accept his theory as soon as it appeared that the evidence was in its favour. But none of them, least of all Einstein himself, would claim that he has said the last word. He has not built a monument of infallible dogma to stand for all time. There are difficulties he cannot solve; his doctrines will have to be modified in their turn as they have modified Newton's. This critical undogmatic receptiveness is the true attitude of science.

Beginning in 1946, Jawaharlal Nehru, the first Prime Minister of independent India, popularized the use of the phrase "scientific temper" to further propagate the notion. He gave a descriptive explanation in The Discovery of India:

The scientific temper points out the way along which man should travel. It is the temper of a free man. We live in a scientific age, so we are told, but there is little evidence of this temper in the people anywhere or even their leaders. [What is needed] is the scientific approach, the adventurous and yet critical temper of science, the search for truth and new knowledge, the refusal to accept anything without testing and trial, the capacity to change previous conclusions in the face of new evidence, the reliance on observed fact and not on pre-conceived theory, the hard discipline of the mind—all this is necessary, not merely for the application of science but for life itself and the solution of its many problems.

Nehru wrote that the scientific temper goes beyond the domains to which science is conventionally understood to be limited to, and deals also with the consideration of ultimate purposes, beauty, goodness and truth. He contended that the scientific temper is the opposite of the method of religion, which relies on emotion and intuition and is (mis)applied "to everything in life, even to those things which are capable of intellectual inquiry and observation." While religion tends to close the mind and produce "intolerance, credulity and superstition, emotionalism and irrationalism", and "a temper of a dependent, unfree person", a scientific temper "is the temper of a free man." He also indicated that the scientific temper goes beyond objectivity and fosters creativity and progress. He envisioned that the spread of scientific temper would be accompanied by a shrinking of the domain of religion, and "the exciting adventure of fresh and never ceasing discoveries, of new panoramas opening out and new ways of living, adding to [life's] fullness and ever making it richer and more complete." He also stated, "It is science alone that can solve the problems of hunger and poverty, of insanitation and illiteracy, of superstition and deadening custom and tradition, of vast resources running to waste, of a rich country inhabited by starving people."

== Recognition in India ==
=== Fundamental duty of Indian citizen ===
India is the first and only country to explicitly adopt scientific temper in its constitution. In the forty-second amendment in 1976, Article 51 A(h) was added under the Fundamental Duties that states:

[It shall be the duty of every citizen of India] To develop scientific temper, humanism and the spirit of inquiry and reform.

=== Government actions ===
The first major programme under the Government of India to popularise scientific temper among the people was the Vigyan Mandir (temple of knowledge/science) experiment in 1953. It was created by S. S. Bhatnagar, at the time Head of the Council of Scientific and Industrial Research (CSIR), in Delhi and launched by Nehru on 15 August. Its purpose was to "disseminate scientific information of interest to the rural population" and the centres were furnished with scientific tools, films, and books.

CSIR started publishing a popular science periodical Vigyan Pragati (Progress in Science) in Hindi in 1952. It introduced an English monthly journal Science Reporter in 1964, and then an Urdu quarterly journal Science Ki Dunia. In 1982, the National Council for Science and Technology Communication (NCSTC) was established under the Department of Science and Technology. NCSTC "is mandated to communicate Science and Technology to masses, stimulate scientific and technological temper and coordinate and orchestrate such efforts throughout the country."

NCSTC organises annual programmes such as National Science Day and National Mathematics Day, the National Children's Science Congress, National Teacher's Science Congress, and Science Express. It specifically dedicated the National Science Day on 28 February 2014 to the theme "Fostering Scientific Temper" to spread Nehru's vision.

The National Institute of Science Communication and Information Resources launched the scholarly serial Journal of Scientific Temper in 2013.
