= E. V. Sampathkumaran =

Indian physicist (born 1954)

- Born: 6 December 1954 (age 71); Tamil Nadu, India
- Education: University of Madras; Annamalai University; University of Mumbai; Free University of Berlin
- Known for: Studies on Magnetic systems and superconductivity
- Awards: 1986 INSA Young Scientists Medal; 1996 Materials Research Society of India Award; 1999 Shanti Swarup Bhatnagar Prize
- Scientific career
- Fields: Condensed matter physics
- Workplaces: Tata Institute of Fundamental Research; University of Kyoto-visiting; Jawaharlal Nehru Centre for Advanced Scientific Research-honorary
- Doctoral advisor: Ramanuja Vijayaraghavan; G. Kaindl

Echur Varadadesikan Sampathkumaran (born 6 December 1954) is an Indian condensed matter physicist and a distinguished professor at the Tata Institute of Fundamental Research. Known for his research on the thermal and transport behaviour of magnetic systems, Sampathkumaran is an elected fellow of major Indian science academies viz. Indian Academy of Sciences, Indian National Science Academy, National Academy of Sciences, India and The World Academy of Sciences. The Council of Scientific and Industrial Research, the apex agency of the Government of India for scientific research, awarded him the Shanti Swarup Bhatnagar Prize for Science and Technology, one of the highest Indian science awards, for his contributions to physical sciences in 1999. (Note: Long link - please select award year to see details)

== Biography ==
E. V. Sampathkumaran, born on 6 December 1954 in the south Indian state of Tamil Nadu, earned his BSc degree from the University of Madras before obtaining a master's degree from Annamalai University. Subsequently, he joined Tata Institute of Fundamental Research as a member of faculty in 1976. During this period, he enrolled at the University of Mumbai for doctoral studies on valence fluctuations in rare-earth compounds and secured a PhD in 1982, guided by Ramanuja Vijayaraghavan, a Shanti Swarup Bhatnagar laureate. He did his post-doctoral work on valence fluctuations as an Alexander von Humboldt Fellow at the Free University of Berlin, under the guidance of G. Kaindl, during 1983–84 and returned to TIFR to resume his career there. Barring two sabbaticals, the first as an Indo-Waseda Exchange Visitor for two months in 1988 to Japan and the other, a two-month stint at Paderborn University in 1996, his entire career was spent at TIFR, holding various positions. During 2008–10, he chaired the Department of Condensed Matter Physics and Materials Science after which he served as the dean of the Natural Sciences faculty from 2010 to 2013. After his superannuation in 2014, he continues his association with the institute as a distinguished professor. He also had a brief stint as the director of the institute during April–July 2015 and served as an honorary professor at Jawaharlal Nehru Centre for Advanced Scientific Research from 2001 to 2015.

== Legacy ==
Animation about the magnetoresistance discovery Graphs

Sampathkumaran's early research was focused on intermetallics and oxides, with regard to their solid state properties and his work led to the identification of new fluctuating-valent rare-earth systems. The thermal and transport behaviour of magnetic systems, superconductivity, physics of d- and f-electron systems, Kondo lattices, geometrically frustrated magnetism, spin-chain magnetism, multiferroics and nanomagnetism have been some of the other areas of his work. His studies have been documented by way of a number of articles (Note: Please see Selected bibliography section) and the online article repository of the Indian Academy of Sciences has listed 302 of them.

Sampathkumaran is a member of the editorial boards of Solid State Communications and Journal of Magnetism and Magnetic Materials of Elsevier and Scientific Reports journal of Nature. He is a former editorial board member of Pramana journal (1996–2010) and the now discontinued The Open Condensed Matter Physics Journal of Bentham Science Publishers. He is a former member of Asia-Pacific Academy of Materials and sat in the executive committee of the Indian Physics Association from 2014 to 2016. His association with government agencies included membership in two committees of the Department of Science and Technology, namely the program advisory committee on Condensed Matter Physics (1995–98) and the committee for SERC Schools in Condensed Matter Physics (1998–). He is also a former member of the governing councils or management boards of Indian Association for the Cultivation of Science (2010–2011), National Physical Laboratory (2010–2012) Raja Ramanna Centre for Advanced Technology (2010–2013) and TIFR Centre for Interdisciplinary Sciences at Hyderabad and the selection committees of Indian National Science Academy (2012–2014) and Indian Academy of Sciences (2013—2015).

== Awards and honors ==
The Indian National Science Academy awarded Sampathkumaran the INSA Young Scientists Medal in 1986 and a decade later, he received the MRSI Medal of the Materials Research Society of India in 1996. The Council of Scientific and Industrial Research awarded him the Shanti Swarup Bhatnagar Prize, one of the highest Indian science awards in 1999.

The Indian Academy of Sciences was the first Indian academy to honor him with an elected membership which he received in 1998. The other two major academies followed suit, the elected fellowship of the National Academy of Sciences, India reaching him in 1999 and that of the Indian National Science Academy in 2001. He received the fellowship of The World Academy of Sciences in 2012. He is also a recipient of the 2008 J. C. Bose National Fellowship of the Department of Science and Technology.

== Selected bibliography ==
- N. Mohapatra, K. K. Iyer, E. V. Sampathkumaran (2008). "Large magnetocaloric effect and magnetoresistance behavior in Gd_{4}Co_{3}". The European Physical Journal B. 63 (4): 451–454. arXiv:0712.1999. Bibcode:2008EPJB...63..451M. doi:10.1140/epjb/e2008-00266-x. S2CID 123290843.
- Sitikantha D. Das, S. Narayana Jammalamadaka, Kartik K. Iyer, E. V. Sampathkumaran (2009). "Magnetic ordering in the fine particles of some bulk Pauli paramagnets". Physical Review B. 80 (2) 024401. arXiv:0906.4887. Bibcode:2009PhRvB..80b4401D. doi:10.1103/PhysRevB.80.024401. S2CID 118482309.
- Kalobaran Maiti, Swapnil Patil, E. V. Sampathkumaran (2010). "Kondo resonance in magnetic and non-magnetic Ce-intermetallics". AIP Conference Proceedings. 1347: 181–186. doi:10.1063/1.3601812.
- E. V. Sampathkumaran, K. Mukherjee, Kartik K. Iyer, Niharika Mohapatra, Sitikantha D. Das (2011). "Magnetism of fine particles of Kondo lattices, obtained by high-energy ball-milling". Journal of Physics: Condensed Matter. 23 (9) 094209. arXiv:1101.2010. Bibcode:2011JPCM...23i4209S. doi:10.1088/0953-8984/23/9/094209. PMID 21339562. S2CID 23521626.
- K. Mukherjee, Kartik K. Iyer, E. V. Sampathkumaran (2012). "Contrasting magnetic behavior of fine particles of some Kondo lattices". Solid State Communications. 152 (7): 606–611. arXiv:1111.6370. Bibcode:2012SSCom.152..606M. doi:10.1016/j.ssc.2012.01.022. S2CID 27289768.

== See also ==
- Kondo effect
- Rare-earth magnet
