= A. R. Rao =

Indian mathematician

- Born: 23 September 1908; Salem, Madras Presidency, British India (now in Tamil Nadu, India)
- Died: 4 April 2011 (aged 102); Ahmedabad, Gujarat, India
- Citizenship: Indian
- Occupation(s): Professor, mathematician

A. R. Rao (23 September 1908 – 4 April 2011) was an Indian mathematician. After a career as a professor of mathematics in various colleges in Gujarat, he joined a community science centre in Ahmedabad where he developed models and methods to popularize mathematics among the masses.

== Biography ==
Rao was born on 23 September 1908 in Salem district of present-day Tamil Nadu. He studied B.Sc. from Presidency College, Madras and M.Sc. from Wilson College, Bombay. He joined Bahauddin College, Junagadh as a professor and made Gujarat his residence. After teaching for 27 years in Junagadh, he was transferred to Gujarat College, Ahmedabad. In 1964, he was appointed as a principal of Sir P. P. Institute of Science, Bhavnagar and he retired in 1976.

After his retirement from academics, he joined the Vikram A. Sarabhai Community Science Centre (VASCSC) which was established in the 60s by Dr. Sarabhai, initially at Sanskar Kendra, Paldi, before moving to its present building in 1971. in Ahmedabad as the head of the mathematics department. He was interested in education, research, experimentation, problem solving and popularizing mathematics among the masses. He pioneered a mathematical laboratory at the VASCSC (posthumously renamed in his memory) in Ahmedabad. He explored methods to popularize mathematics through fun workshops and toys. He designed models and experiments to teach mathematics. He popularized mathematics in the state and in academics, and prepared students to participate in the International Mathematical Olympiad. Projective geometry, number theory and combinatorics were his subjects of interest in mathematics.

He had written several books including Brain Sharpners, a book on mathematical puzzles.

He worked till January 2011 and died at the age of 102 years on 22 October 2011 following heart attack.

He lived in Ahmedabad with his family, most of which continues to live in Ahmedabad and Thane.

== Recognition ==
Rao had received the national award from the Department of Science and Technology, Government of India. He was felicitated by the National Board for Higher Mathematics, Indian Mathematical Association and Gujarat Ganit Mandal and had received a prize of recognition from the President of India as well as the then Chief Minister of Gujarat Narendra Modi. The Gujarat Ganit Mandal has produced a documentary on him.
