= Science Week =

Series of public science-related events

Science Week (sometimes National Science Week) refers to series of science-related events for the general public which are held in a specific countries during a designated week of the year. The aim of such science weeks is to engage and inspire people of all ages with science, engineering and technology.

== Australia ==
Australia's National Science Week is held annually in August, funded through the Department of Industry, Innovation and Science. National Science Week welcomes an audience of over a million and hosts more than 1000 events across the nation. Science Week provides an opportunity for all Australians to participate in events and activities that showcase science and encourages younger people to consider continuing studies in science. Past participants have included polar explorer and environmental scientist Tim Jarvis, NASA Astronaut Katherine Megan McArthur, environmentalist Tanya Ha, theoretical physicist Lawrence Krauss, and palaeontologist Scott Sampson. Another key activity during National Science Week is the National Project, which is run in conjunction with ABC Australia. Past projects have included Weather Detective in 2014 and the Aussie Star Hunt in 2009. Also in 2009, Cosmos Magazine launched a website called HELLO FROM EARTH which collected over 28,000 messages which were beamed to the first Earth like planet candidate, Gliese 581d. In 2016, it included Wikibomb2016, a project to create missing Wikipedia pages on Australian women scientists.

== India ==
In India, Science Week culminates in National Science Day, which takes place each year on 28 February to commemorate C. V. Raman's discovery of the Raman Effect.

== Ireland ==
Science Week Ireland is an annual week-long event in Ireland each November, celebrating science in our everyday lives. Science Week is currently an initiative of Science Foundation Ireland (SFI), but was previously run organisations including the Royal Dublin Society and Forfás. It is the largest science festival in the country, engaging tens of thousands of members of the general public in workshops, science shows, talks, laboratory demonstrations, science walks and other science-related events. Science Week is a collaboration of events involving industry, colleges, schools, libraries, teachers, researchers and students throughout Ireland.

It supports Science Foundation Ireland’s mission to catalyse, inspire and guide the best in science, technology, engineering and maths (STEM) education and public engagement. The ultimate aim of this effort is that Ireland will have the most engaged and scientifically informed public by 2020 as outlined in Science Foundation Ireland’s strategy Agenda 2020. This also aligns to the national science innovation strategy, Innovation 2020.

Science Week 2021 will take place from the 7th – 14 November.

== United Kingdom ==
Britain's National Science Week was first held in 1994. It is now known as British Science Week and is one of the largest national celebrations of science. It is organised by the British Science Association and funded by BEIS (UK Department for Business, Energy, Innovation and Skills) and other partners. British Science Week is a massive UK-wide grassroots celebration of science which saw over 1 million people taking part in over 2,300 events and activities throughout the UK in 2017.

== United States ==
In the United States, the National Science & Technology Week was one of the National Science Foundation's main outreach efforts between 1985 and 1999, before the program was succeeded by Find Out Why, a year-long outreach effort focused on families, offering everyday science activities. The idea was revisited in 2005 by the U.S. Department of Education and the National Aeronautics and Space Administration, in collaboration with other government and scientific partners, with an "Excellence in Science, Technology, Engineering, and Mathematics Education (ESTEME) Week."

== Other programmes ==
Other national science weeks include the Norwegian Forskningsdagene ("Research Days"), Canada's National Science & Technology Week, the South African National Science Week, and China's National Science Week launched in May 2006. On an international level, the European Union has held union-wide science weeks between 2000 and 2006.

=== Catalonia ===
Science Week in Catalonia is a collective programme of activities with over 350 events to disseminate scientific knowledge in the Catalonia autonomous region of Northern Spain. Organised by the Catalan Foundation for Research and Innovation (FCRi), it involves around 150 organisations from universities, research centers, museums, associations, and companies. Its aims are to offer society, especially young people, original and accessible ways of conveying scientific knowledge that will encourage future scientific vocations. At the same time, the programme works to speed up the Catalan research system's efforts to disseminate scientific knowledge. One of the highlights of Science Week in Catalonia is the Science Day in Schools.

The first edition of Science Week in Catalonia took place in 1996 in Spain, with yearly followup events funded by different Catalan institutions, companies and associations.
