= Annamalai University =

Public university in Tamil Nadu, India

- Aṇṇāmalai Palkalaikkazhagam (Tamil)
- The Official Coat of Arms
- Other name: Tamil: Aṇṇāmalai palkalaikkazhagam
- Former name: Sri Meenakshi College
- Motto: "With Courage And Faith"
- Type: State University (Government)
- Established: 1929; 97 years ago
- Founders: Raja of Chettinad; S. Rm. M. Annamalai Chettiar (His Highness the King of Chettinad)
- Accreditation: NAAC; NBA
- Affiliations: UGC; ACU; AIU; AICTE; ICAR; NCTE; PCI; WES; DEB
- Chancellor: Governor of Tamil Nadu
- Vice-Chancellor: V. Selvanarayanan (I/C)
- Academic staff: 2,281
- Students: 32,480
- Undergraduates: 23,256
- Postgraduates: 8,067
- Doctoral students: 998
- Location: Chidambaram, Tamil Nadu, India; 11.3908°N 79.7148°E
- Campus: Suburban, 1,500 acres (610 ha)
- Language: English; Tamil
Colours
- Nicknames: AU; ANNAMALAIANS
- Website: annamalaiuniversity.ac.in

The Annamalai University (AU) is a public state university in Chidambaram, Tamil Nadu, India. The 1,500-acre (6.1 km^{2}) sprawling campus offers courses of higher education in arts, science, engineering, management, humanities, agriculture, and physical education. With over 32,480 students residing on campus, it is one of the largest teaching, and residential universities in Asia,

The National Assessment and Accreditation Council has conferred accreditation to the university in the fourth cycle, and subsequently with its highest A+ grade in 2022. Annamalai University is also recognized among the top 18 universities in India having the 'Centre with Potential for Excellence in Particular Area (CPEPA)' with a focus on drug development and climate change.

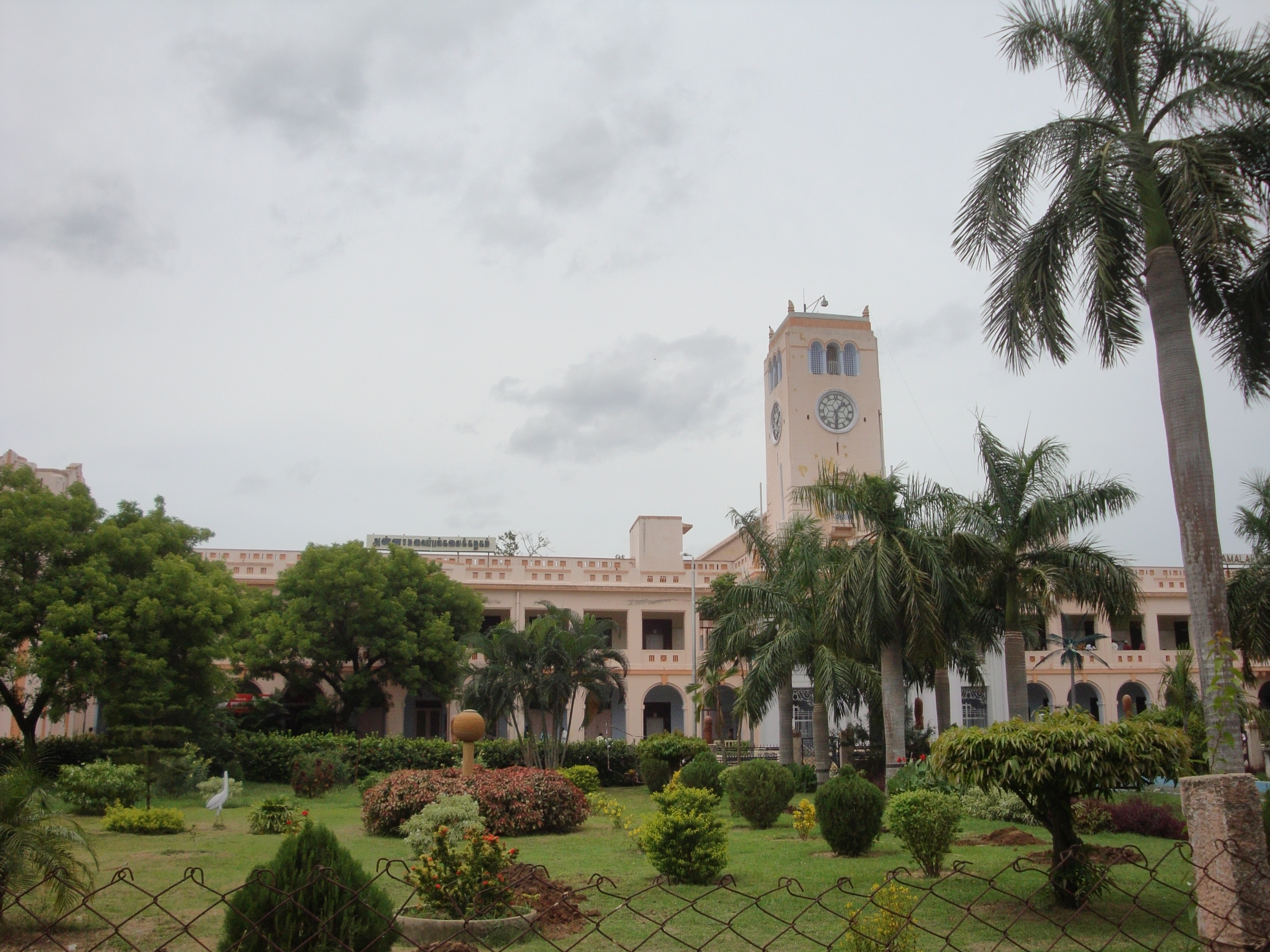
Administrative building of the Annamalai University

Annamalai University is a member of the Association of Indian Universities (AIU) and The Association of Commonwealth Universities (ACU). All the degrees awarded by Annamalai University senate are mutually recognized by all Indian Universities and Foreign Universities under the commonwealth fold. The Division of Continuing Education or Directorate of Distance Education of the university is also a permanent member of AMDISA (Association of Management Development Institutions in South Asia) that provides the SAQS Accreditation (South Asian Quality System) to the Institutions.

== Foundation and history ==
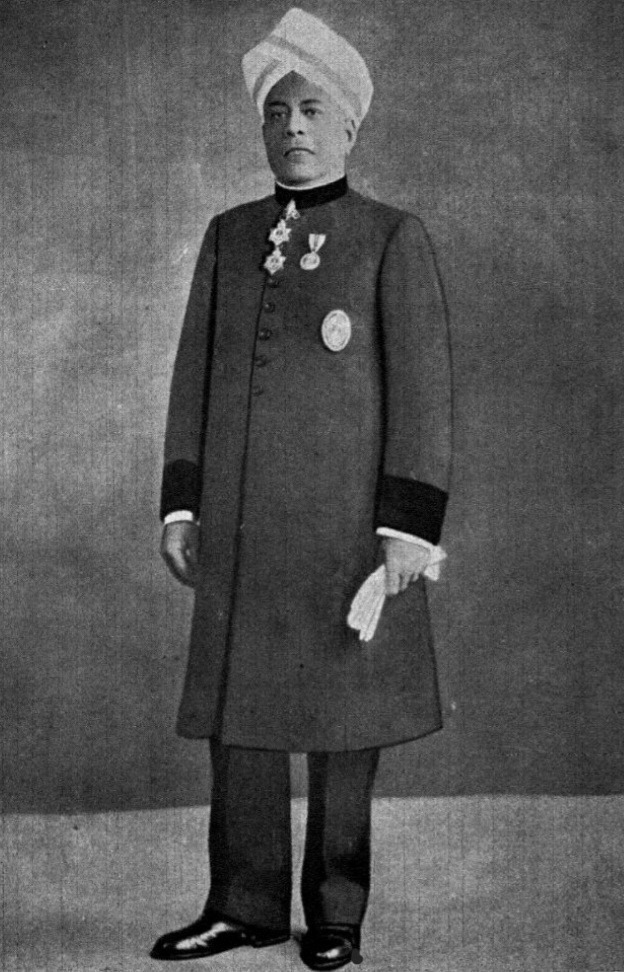
Raja Sir Annamalai Chettiar in London

The university was founded in 1929 by the entrepreneur Rajah Sir S. Rm. M. Annamalai Chettiar in the aftermath of the Montagu–Chelmsford Reforms. In the early 1920s, to serve the downtrodden and to promote Tamil literature, Rajah Sir S. R. M. Annamalai Chettiar founded Sri Minakshi College, Sri Minakshi Tamil College and Sri Minakshi Sanskrit College in a rural setup at Chidambaram. In 1928, Rajah Sir S. R. M. Annamalai Chettiar agreed with the local government to hand over the above said institution for establishing a university. Thus, on 1 January 1929 Annamalai University was established as per Annamalai University Act 1928 (Tamil Nadu Act 1 of 1929). The most significant development is the enactment of the Annamalai University Act, 2013 (Tamil Nadu Act 20 of 2013), which came into force from 25 September 2013, after obtaining the assent of the President of India.

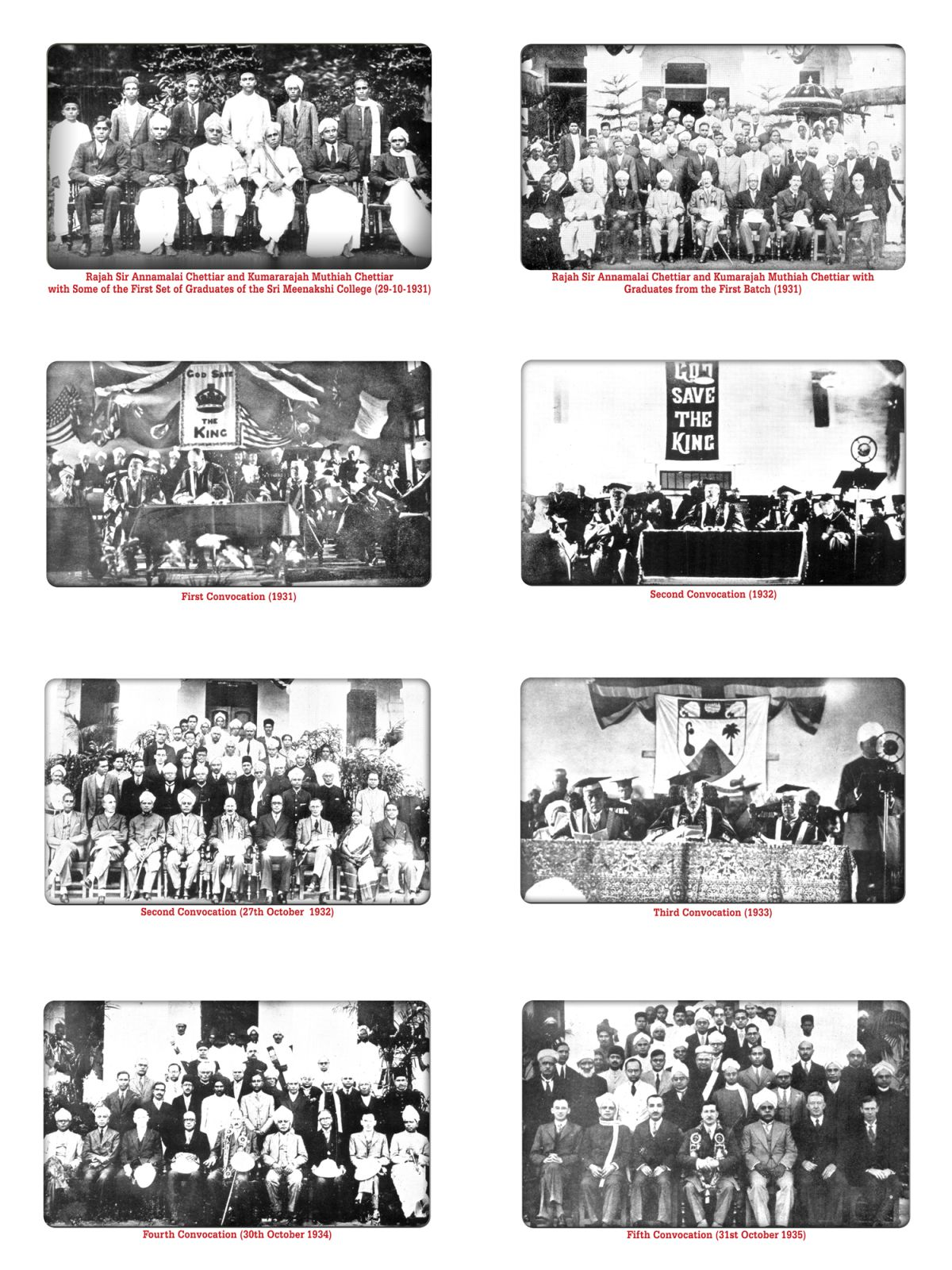

== Faculties ==
The university has ten faculties, namely agriculture, arts (including management studies), education, engineering and technology, fine arts, Indian languages, marine sciences, and science.

== Organization and administration ==
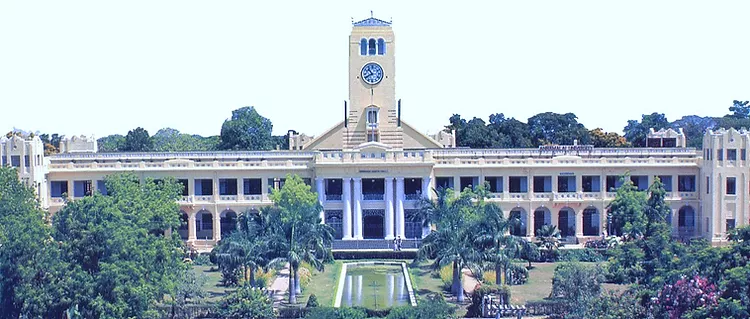
AU Senate

The organizational structure of Annamalai University consists of the Senate, the Syndicate, the Academic Council, the faculties, the Finance Committee, and the Boards of studies. The governor of Tamil Nadu is the chancellor of the university. The vice-chancellor is the executive head of the university. The registrar of the university, who is the secretary of the Syndicate, is the custodian of all the records and chief administrator of the university. The examinations of the university is managed by Office of the Controller of Examinations.

== Affiliated Colleges ==
In July 2021 Higher Education Minister of Tamil Nadu K. Ponmudy announced to change the status of Annamalai University from unitary to affiliating university. The university have colleges affiliated to it from four districts, namely Cuddalore, Kallakurichi Mayiladuthurai and Villupuram. In his recent announcement 14 more colleges of Mayiladuthurai district merged with Annamalai University which was earlier affiliated with Bharathidasan University.

== Controversies ==
In March 2022, the UGC warned students against enrolling for any online and distance learning courses offered by the university as it did not have the requisite recognition to do so from the UGC.

In May 2022, Annamalai University issued a writ petition to the Madras High Court to annul the order from the UGC.

In January 2023 Madras High Court protected and validated all the degrees and courses offered by the Annamalai University under Distance or Executive mode. The court in its order said that the operation of the notice was stayed earlier in 2016 and students were admitted legally and those students who have admitted and who have completed courses will not be affected by our order dismissing the writ petitions. As regards challenge to the circular restricting the education of students was stayed by the Madras High Court and those students who have completed their course will be entitled to their respective degrees by the Senate of Annamalai University. The court clearly stated that the students who have been enrolled in programmes under the protection of Interim orders of this court will stand protected and their degrees will be valid.

== Academics ==
=== Accreditation ===
The National Assessment and Accreditation Council accredited Annamalai University with a grade of "A+" in 2022. The Faculty of Agriculture of Annamalai University is accredited with ICAR (NAEAB).

=== Rankings ===
University and college rankings

General – international
- QS (Asia) (2023): 301-350
- Times (Asia) (2022): 501-600

General – India
- NIRF (Overall) (2024): 151-200
- NIRF (Universities) (2023): 101-150

Engineering – India
- NIRF (2023): 151-200

Pharmacy – India
- NIRF (2024): 27

On 6 August 2022 Annamalai University was ranked 15th in India overall among government universities by the magazine India Today.

The university was ranked 27th in India by the NIRF (National Institutional Ranking Framework) in the pharmacy and Agriculture ranking of 2024.

=== Division of Continuing Education ===
The Annamalai University Directorate of Distance Education or Division of Continuing Education was established in 1979 and offers more than 500 courses, including MBAs. All study programmes offered by the Senate of the university are approved by the Distance Education Council (UGC-DEB) & All India Council for Technical Education (AICTE). The B.Ed. programme is approved by the National Council for Teacher Education.

Annamalai University opened its first international office in Toronto, Canada, in 2006, named Annamalai Canada. As it does not have degree-granting authority in the province of Ontario, it acts as a recruitment office for international students for programs and courses in Tamil language, literature, arts, yoga and dance. It offers bachelor's, master's and Ph.D. degrees awarded by Annamalai University's main campus.

Annamalai University is India's first and oldest university to offer Distance Education Programmes after receiving the assent from the central government.

=== Scholarships and awards ===
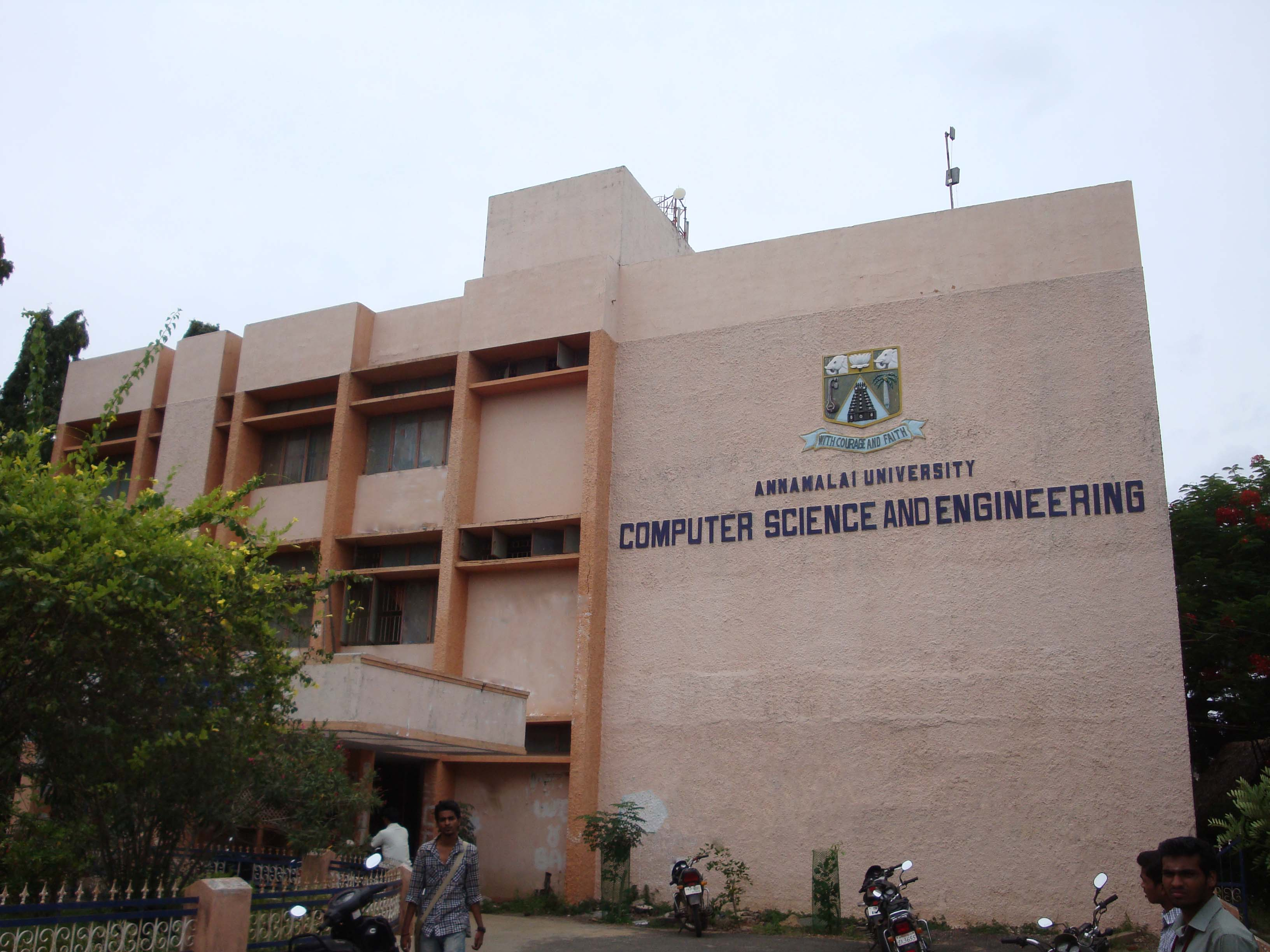
Annamalai University - CSE Department

A total of 356 scholarships and awards are given to eligible candidates every year.

== Notable alumni ==
- P. C. Alexander, IAS, former Governor of Tamil Nadu and Maharashtra
- K. Anbazhagan, former Member of Parliament, Lok Sabha.
- Subbiah Arunachalam
- Sridevi Ashok, TV actress
- C. Sylendra Babu, IPS Tamil Nadu
- K. Balachander, Indian director, producer, writer, actor, playwright, stage conductor, and comedian who worked mainly in the Tamil film industry; graduated in Zoology
- Bala V. Balachandran, founder and Dean, Great Lakes Institute of Management, Chennai, India
- K. Balakrishnan (CPI-M)
- R. K. Baliga, father of the Electronic City in Bangalore, India
- T. K. Doraiswamy, poet and novelist
- Ere. Elamvazhuthi, Ex DMK MLA
- Kulandei Francis, activist, social worker, recipient of the Magsaysay Award in 2012
- R Gandhi, Rtd Deputy Governor RBI
- A. S. Gnanasambandan, Tamil writer, scholar and literary critic from Tamil Nadu, India
- Kovai Gnani, writer and Marxist thinker
- Ravi Gomatam, quantum physicist, director of Bhaktivedanta Institute and Institute for Semantic Information Sciences and Technology, Berkeley, and Mumbai
- Justice V. R. Krishna Iyer, Presidential Candidate, Ex Minister Kerala
- Narayanaswamy Jayaraman, organic chemist and Shanti Swarup Bhatnagar laureate
- D. R. Karthikeyan, IPS
- G. Nammalvar, agriculturist, scientist
- V. Narayanasamy, Ex CM Puducherry
- K. A. Mathiazhagan, senate member of this university, Ex Minister & Speaker Tamil Nadu.
- Vennira Aadai Moorthy, Tamil comedy actor
- N. S. Satya Murthy Shanti Swarup Bhatnagar laureate
- G. Balakrish Nair, Indian microbiologist
- K. S. Narayanaswamy, Carnatic veena exponent of the Thanjavur style
- Nedumaran, Politician
- V. R. Nedunchezhiyan, Ex CM Tamil Nadu
- K. Ponmudy, Minister Tamil Nadu
- Vijaya T. Rajendar, Tamil actor, singer, director and politician
- Panruti S. Ramachandran
- Prof. Sujatha Ramdorai University of British Columbia
- Savitha Reddy, dubbing artist in the southern India film industry
- V. Sethuraman, De
- V. T. Sambanathan, fiEx Psident of laysian Indian Congress a.
- E. V. Sampathkumaran Shanti Swarup Bhatnagar laureate
- Narayanasami Sathyamurthy, scientist
- Pakkiriswamy Chandra Sekharan, Forensic Expert & Padma Bhushan recipient
- S. S. Sivasankar, Minister Tamil Nadu
- S. D. Somasundaram, Ex Minister
- S. Srinivasan, Aerospace Scientist.
- Vijayalakshmy Subramaniam, Carnatic music vocalist
- M. Swaraj, Former MLA, State of Kerala.
- Ramanuja Vijayaraghavan Shanti Swarup Bhatnagar laureate, UGC Raman Award.

== See also ==
- List of educational institutions in Tamil Nadu
