= Vijayalakshmy Subramaniam =

Carnatic vocalist

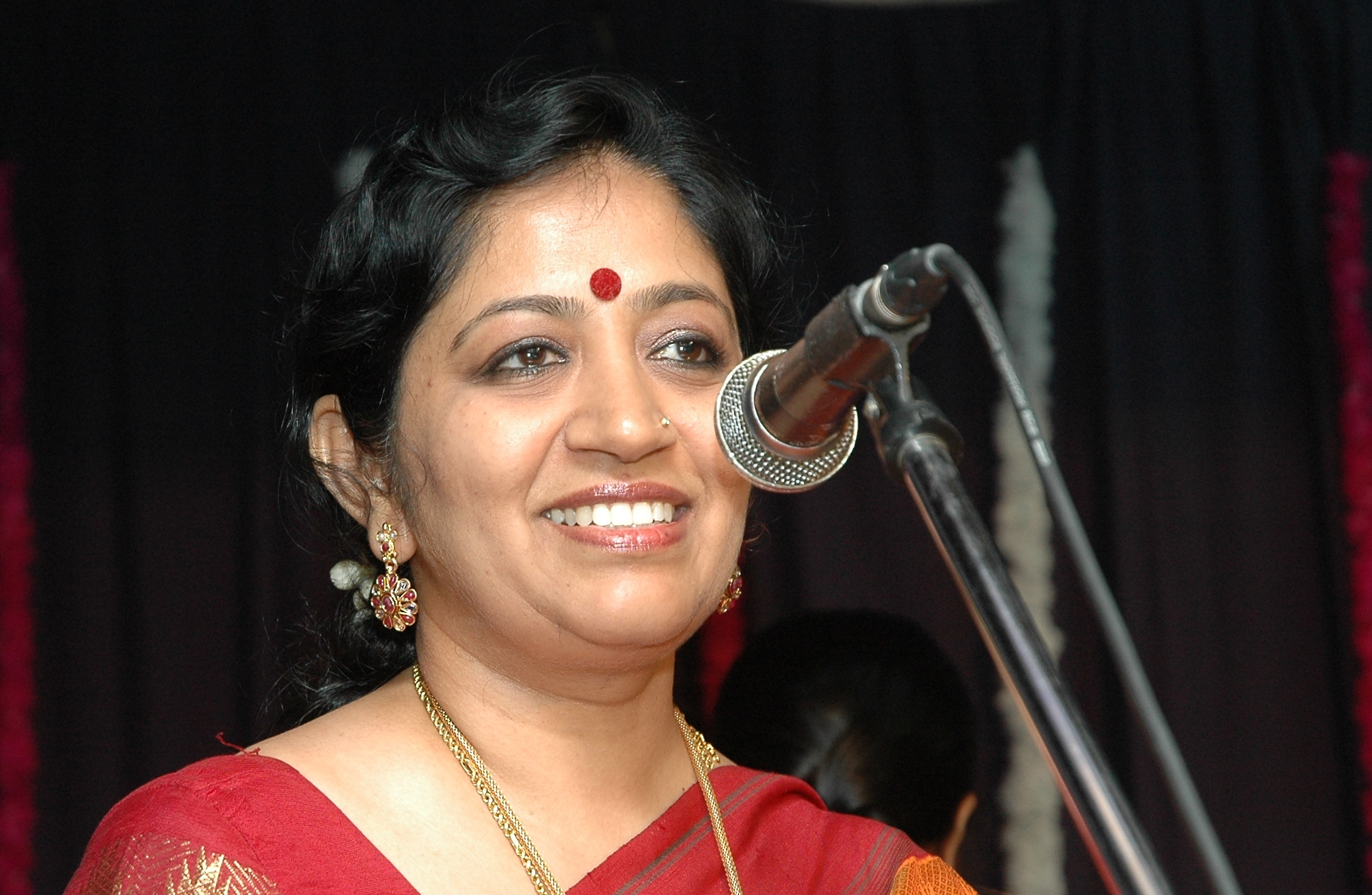
- Vijayalakshmy Subramaniam

Background information
- Also known as: Viji
- Genres: Indian classical music, Carnatic Music
- Occupation: Carnatic musician – vocalist
- Website: vijayalakshmysubramaniam.com

Vijayalakshmy Subramaniam is a Carnatic music vocalist. She has performed in India and abroad since the age of 12. She has also conducted workshops and lecture demonstrations on various aspects of Carnatic music and presented papers at international conferences. In June 2007, she published "Apoorva Kriti Manjari", a collection of twenty rare compositions of the Trinity of Carnatic Music. The book features notations in English and Tamil by musicologist S. Balachander, and an audio recording by Subramaniam. Subramaniam was awarded the Fulbright Visiting Lecturer Fellowship in 2010. As part of the program, she taught "An Introduction to Indian Music" at Duke University, North Carolina, USA (August–November 2010).

== Early life ==
Subramaniam began her Carnatic music training at the age of 5.

== Fulbright Fellowship ==
Subramaniam was awarded the Fulbright Visiting Lecturer Fellowship by the United States Department of State, Bureau of Educational Affairs in 2010. She was invited to Duke University to teach "An Introduction to Indian Music" (August–November 2010). She also taught for a month at North Carolina State University, Raleigh.

== Academics and scholarships ==
Subramaniam received a Government of India Junior Talent Scholarship (1977–1983). In 1982, she completed a Sangeet Shiromani diploma in Carnatic Music from Delhi University. She received a scholarship from the Sahitya Kala Parishad, New Delhi (1983–1985). In 1987, she completed the Sangeet Alankar at Gandharva Mahavidyalaya, New Delhi. She received a Fulbright Visiting Lecturer Fellowship in the USA in 2010. In March 2011, she earned a PhD in music from Annamalai University, Tamil Nadu, for her dissertation on "Tamil Composers of the Twentieth Century".

== Albums released ==
- Apoorva Kriti Manjari
- Kritis of Annamayya – Charsur Digital Workstation
- Raga Series – TODI – Charsur Digital Workstation
- Kshetra Sringeri – Charsur Digital Workstation
- Muruga Muruga – Rajalakshmi Audio
- Madrasil Margazhi – Rajalakshmi Audio
- Sarvanandham – Rajalakshmi Audio

== Awards ==
- Nada Bhushanam, Shanmukhananda Sangeetha Sabha, New Delhi, March 2012
- M.S Subbulakshmi Award, Narada Gana Sabha, Chennai, December 2010
- Best Pallavi rendition prize, The Music Academy, Chennai, January 2007
- Sahityapriya award, Kalavardhani, June 2006
- Sarada Krishna Iyer award for outstanding performance, The Music Academy, Chennai, January 2005
- Tulasivana Puraskaram, Tulasivanam Parishat, Kerala, December 2004
- Sangeetha Shikamani award, Andhra Social and Cultural Association, Chennai, 2000
- Gaana Seva Rathnam award, Purandara Dasar Aradhana Mahotsava Sabha, Chennai, 1997
- Best Vocalist award (sub senior category), The Music Academy, Annual Music Festival, 1996 and 1999
- Outstanding Young Person award, Jaycees, Kilpauk Chamber, Chennai, 1996
