= Ravi Gomatam =

Indian academic

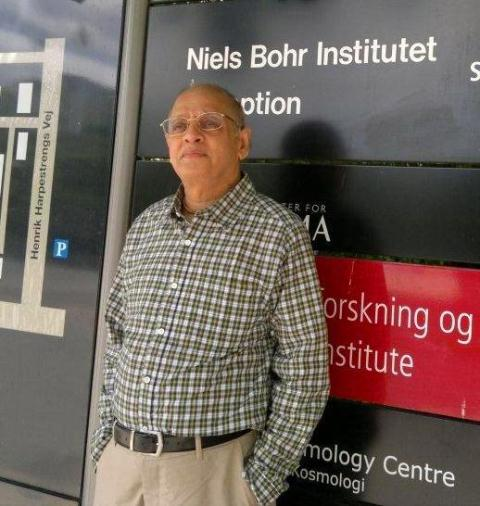
- Ravi Gomatam, June, 2011
- Education: Annamalai University; BITS Pilani; University of Mumbai
- Scientific career
- Fields: Quantum physics

Ravi Veeraraghavan Gomatam (born in Chennai, India) is the director of Bhaktivedanta Institute (Berkeley and Mumbai) and the newly formed Institute of Semantic Information Sciences and Technology, Mumbai. He teaches graduate-level courses at these institutes. He was an adjunct professor at Birla Institute of Technology & Science (BITS), Pilani, Rajasthan, India (1993–2015).

He has been made a visiting professor for the year 2016–2017 at the Indian Council of Philosophical Research (ICPR), a Government of India body, under the Ministry of Human Resource Development.

In January 1990, he organized a conference titled First International Conference on the Study of Consciousness within Science in San Francisco. Subsequently, in 1997 Gomatam conceived and launched the world's first M.S./Ph.D. programs in "consciousness studies", in collaboration with the Birla Institute of Technology & Science (BITS), Pilani (one of India's foremost technological universities). "Consciousness Studies" is a developing, inter-disciplinary scientific field, which Gomatam has particularly re-conceived as a new way of studying matter.

In 2015, the Institute of Semantic Information Sciences and Technology started offering M.A. (by research) and Ph.D. programs in collaboration with the Mumbai University, India.

Gomatam's own field of research is foundations of quantum mechanics, wherein he is introducing a few new ideas, including those of "Objective, Semantic Information" and a notion of "Relational Properties" that is different from that of Rovelli and others. His new ideas have received notice for their potential. He has related research interests in semantic computation, systems sciences, artificial intelligence, philosophy of science and philosophy of language.

== Education ==
- B.E. Electrical and Electronics Engineering, Annamalai University, India
- M.E. Electronics Engineering, Birla Institute of Technology & Science, Pilani, India
- Ph.D. Foundations of Quantum Mechanics, Mumbai University, India. Dissertation Title: Toward a realist interpretation of quantum theory – Integrating Bohr and Einstein.

== Early work in the industry ==
Gomatam worked as a freelance consultant for a number of Fortune-500 companies including General Motors, Ford, Chrysler, Burroughs and IBM in the areas of operating system design, data communications and very-large database design.

== Academic career ==
Starting from the early 1980s, Gomatam turned to fundamental scientific research, and started contributing to the development of the Bhaktivedanta Institute (B.I.) in Mumbai and Berkeley. Along the way, based on the work he was doing at B.I., he obtained his Ph.D. in the foundations of quantum mechanics.

He has been a visiting scholar at University of Pretoria, South Africa and Loyola University, New Orleans, USA.

== Research ==
Gomatam's primary area of research is in non-relativistic quantum mechanics (QM), which emerged in 1925 with Erwin Schrödinger's derivation of the "wave equation".

Gomatam is developing his own approach to macroscopic quantum mechanics (MQM, applying the wave equation to the macroscopic regime), which is distinct from the ideas of ‘macroscopic dissipative systems’ and ‘macroscopic quantum coherence’, developed in the early 80s by Anthony James Leggett. In general, Leggett's attempt is to create an experimental situation using a SQUID, wherein a coherent superposition at the microscopic level can also be scaled up to the macroscopic level, because of involving a large number of microscopic objects (that is, electrons, of the order of 10^15 to 10^20) in coherent superposition.

In contrast, Gomatam is attempting to develop MQM independent of the application of the Schrödinger equation to the micro regime, in such a manner that quantum superposition can be directly observed at the macroscopic level. This involves introducing a new notion of macroscopic objects as quantum kinds, instead of classical objects. In this regard, he is also developing two further new ideas within physics: the ontology of "Objective, Semantic Information" (OSI) and corresponding "Relational Properties" (RPs).

As part of developing his version of MQM, Gomatam has related interests in exotic manifolds, semantic information processing, quantum computation, and philosophy of ordinary language.

== Selected papers ==
- Niels Bohr's Interpretation and the Copenhagen Interpretation—Are the two incompatible?" Here Gomatam contrasts Bohr's Interpretation with Copenhagen Interpretation (where Bohr is a co-author). This paper was a required reading in a course in Quantum Mechanics at Brown University.
- Quantum Theory and the Observation Problem. Michael Turvey credits Gomatam for labeling a key problem in quantum mechanics as "observation problem" which he says were only "implicit in deliberations of Bohr, Einstein, Bell and others: to identify a quantum-compatible nonclassical conception of everyday objects, one consonant with the principle of superposition." Wolfgang Prinz, M.W. Stuckey and Panos Pardalos cite this paper for its key contribution in the field of macroscopic quantum mechanics.
- How Do Classical and Quantum Probabilities Differ?
- Macroscopic Quantum Mechanics and System of Systems Design Approach.
- Quantum Theory, the Chinese Room Argument and the Symbol Grounding Problem.
- Quantum Realism and Haecceity.
- Popper's Propensity Interpretation and Heisenberg's Potentia Interpretation — A comparative assessment.
- Do Hodgson's Propositions Uniquely Characterize Free Will? Invited commentary on a target paper, "A Plain Person's View of Free Will" by David Hodgson.
- Physics and Common Sense: Relearning the Connections in the Light of Quantum Theory.

== Activities and societies ==
- Member of American Association for Artificial Intelligence
- Member of American Philosophical Society
