= Kulandei Francis =

Indian activist and social worker

- Born: 1946 (age 79–80); Salem district, Tamil Nadu
- Education: Annamalai University
- Organization: Integrated Village Development Project
- Website: http://www.ivdpkrishnagiri.org/

Kulandei Francis (born 1946) is an Indian activist, social worker, and the founder of the Integrated Village Development Project NGO in Tamil Nadu. Francis received the Magsaysay Award in 2012.

== Life ==
Francis was born to Kulandei and Mathalai Mary in the village of Karipatti, Salem district, Tamil Nadu. His parents were agricultural labourers and the family was extremely poor. He was the only one of his siblings to obtain a university degree. He has said in interviews that his experiences of childhood poverty, especially an incident in which the local money lender cheated his mother out of the family's sole plot of land, contributed to his decision to take up social work as a vocation.

He completed his B.Com from the Annamalai University in Chidambaram, and in 1970 joined the Fathers of the Holy Cross and studied theology at the De Nobili College in Pune. During the 1970s, he was involved with Caritas India and volunteered as an aid worker during the Bangladesh War of 1971 and the Pune drought of 1972. In 1976 he went to Natrampalayam, a remote rural village in Krishnagiri district, where his exposure to the struggles of the local villagers set him in a new direction; that year he renounced his priesthood, and in 1979 he founded the Integrated Village Development Project. He also completed courses in social development and rural management from Canada and the Philippines.

== Integrated Village Development Project ==
Francis established the Integrated Village Development Project (IVDP) in Krishnagiri in 1979. It began with a series of small initiatives, such as the establishment of night schools and a first aid centre. The IVDP then began a micro-watershed programme, which grew into a network of 331 check dams in 60 villages, benefiting 40,000 people there. In 1989, the organization began establishing women's self-help groups (SHGs). By 2011, there were 8,231 SHGs with 153,990 members with savings worth $40 million and a corpus fund of nearly $9 million.

Francis was one of six recipients of the Magsaysay Award in 2012 for "his profound faith in community energies, and his sustained programs in pursuing the holistic economic empowerment of thousands of women and their families in rural India". In its award citation, the Ramon Magsaysay Award Foundation noted that the program had "become a financially disciplined, self-reliant, member-owned, and member-managed organization" and that the group's provision of credit had allowed for the successful implementation of a diverse range of projects in these villages, including "health and sanitation, housing, livelihood, and children's education, including scholarships, performance-based incentives for students and schools, a primary school for tribal children, and a computer training academy that has, to date, trained some 5,000 children". The IVDP is active in the Dharmapuri, Krishnagiri and Vellore districts of Tamil Nadu.

== Personal life ==
Francis is married to Kosalai Mary and the couple have one daughter.
