= DD Science =

2019 Indian television series

- Genre: Science educational series
- Created by: Vigyan Prasar, Doordarshan
- Country of origin: India
- Original language: Hindi
- No. of episodes: 112

Original release
- Release: 15 January 2019

DD Science is a 2019 Indian science television series that aired on national television Doordarshan. It is a one-hour program on science and technology created by Vigyan Prasar, an autonomous organization under the Department of Science and Technology (DST), in association with the public broadcaster, Doordarshan.

== Overview ==
DD Science is a Hindi-language show that aims to spread scientific awareness among people in India. It was launched by Prasar Bharati, an Indian public broadcasting agency on 15 January 2019. DD Science programs consist of science-based documentaries, studio-based discussions, virtual walkthroughs of scientific institutions, interviews, and short films.

== Episodes ==
Episodes	Title	Duration
1	Tees Meter Telescope	52:38
2	Ek Me Do Jayfal Javitri & ICT in Food	52:50
3	Prakash aur Jeevan And Shapes and Tessellations The maths factors	52:41
4	Harit Kranti And Advance computer	53:32
5	Raksha anusandhan Vikas & Sounding It Out	52:02
6	Kesar & IT Revolution	53:36
7	ALHASAN & Wildlife Conservation	54:44
8	Large Hadron Collider & The Indus Angle	52:35
9	Lahasun chhupa rustam & Banking IT Revolution	53:17
10	Saapekshata ka siddhaant & Network theory	52:46
