= Subbiah Arunachalam =

Indian consultant

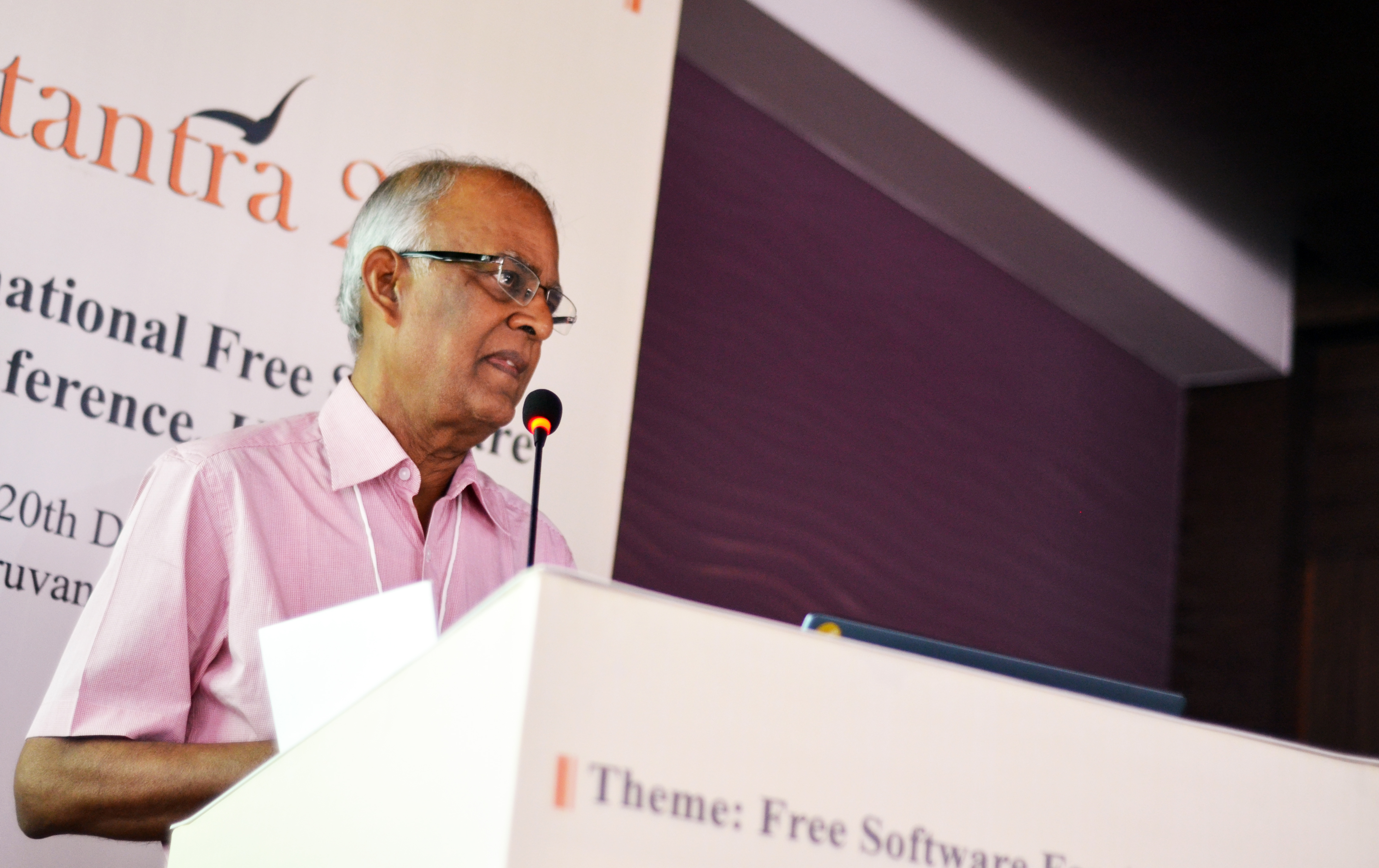
- Scientific career
- Institutions: Central Electro Chemical Research Institute (–1965); Indian Academy of Sciences (1973–1975); Central Electro Chemical Research Institute (–1996); IIT Madras (1996–1998); M. S. Swaminathan Research Foundation (1996–2008); Centre for Internet and Society (2008–)

Subbiah Arunachalam (born 1941) is a Chennai, India-based information consultant known for his campaigns in favour of open access for academic journals in developing countries. He has been associated with the M S Swaminathan Research Foundation.

== Career ==
Linked with the Indian academic and scholarly communities for over three decades, Arunachalam has held posts of editor of scientific journals such as the Indian Journal of Technology, Journal of Scientific & Industrial Research, Indian Journal of Chemistry, Proceedings of the Indian Academy of Sciences, and Pramana.

In an interview, Arunachalam described his career: "I started out as a student of chemistry, and after obtaining a Masters in Chemistry at Annamalai University in 1963, I took a research assistant’s job at the Central Electro Chemical Research Institute, Karaikudi. I worked there for 21 months, doing research in electroplating."

"In May 1965, I moved to New Delhi, to work as an editorial assistant in the Publications & Information Directorate of the Council of Scientific & Industrial Research (CSIR). Then in 1969, I took three years' leave to pursue research in physical chemistry at the Indian Institute of Science (IISc), Bangalore."

Arunachalam has said he has never taken a course in information science, but "simply developed a natural flair for some aspects of information science, largely focused on the needs of students of science seeking information for research, and those wanting to look at and 'evaluate' performance in scientific research."

Since the 1970s, he has been on the editorial boards of journals like Current Contents, Journal of Information Science (since its launch in 1979), Scientometrics, Public Understanding of Science, and Current Science.

== Other roles ==
He has also been involved in various other roles—science writer, researcher in chemistry, teacher of information science, librarian, executive secretary of the Indian Academy of Sciences, and member of the editorial boards of scientific journals. In recent years, he has been Distinguished Fellow at the M S Swaminathan Research Foundation and at the Centre for Internet and Society (Bangalore).

== Current interests ==
In mid-2006, Arunachalam described his role thus: "Currently, I am active in two areas, in both of which my flair for information work comes in handy. For more than ten years I have been a full-time volunteer at the M S Swaminathan Research Foundation (MSSRF), in Chennai. There I am part of the Information Village Research Project, which uses new ICTs to empower rural communities, and an adviser to the National Virtual Academy."

He is also on the executive committee of the Global Knowledge Partnership, and the international advisory board of the International Institute for Communication and Development (IICD). Arunachalam is one of three secretaries of Mission 2007, a Government of India-initiated project which aims at taking the "knowledge revolution" to India's villages. Besides, he is a member of the Working Group on Libraries set up by India's National Knowledge Commission.

== "Great advocate for Open Access" ==
In a post made in 2003, Stevan Harnad, another Open Access (OA) advocate, called Arunachalam "India's and the Developing World's great advocate for open access". Arunachalam had then been named as Co-Director of the CogPrints Archive.

Arunachalam has said that his "interest in promoting Open Access specifically started around 1996, when I began working as a visiting faculty at the Indian Institute of Technology, Chennai".

He has argued that research performed in India, and funded by Indian taxpayers, is reported in a few thousand journals, both Indian and foreign. But since some of these journals are very expensive, "many Indian libraries -- including sometimes the author's own institutional library -- are not able to subscribe to them. As consequence, other Indian scientists working in the same, or related, areas are unable to read these papers. This is a problem common to all developing countries."

Arunachalam's view is that "if all these papers were published in OA journals, or if the authors made them freely available on the Web by self-archiving them — either in institutional OA archives or in central archives like arXiv and CiteSeer — then the problem would vanish." He is known to favour the self-archiving route for Indian researchers. This is because, he says, "it would allow us to achieve 100% OA (open access) more quickly."

Indian research is believed to be published in equal proportions in both Indian and foreign journals, but most Indian ones have a very poor circulation. Resultantly, Indian research work does not reach a wide audience, "affecting both its visibility and its impact". Hence, Arunachalam has argued that Open Access archives are "very important" for the Indian researcher, whom it could offer greater visibility.
