= G. Balakrish Nair =

Indian microbiologist (born 1954)

Gopinath Balakrish Nair (born 5 January 1954) is an Indian microbiologist known for his work on cholera. He worked as Regional Adviser, Research Policy and Cooperation Unit, Department of Communicable Diseases, World Health Organization. Before joining WHO, he was the executive director of Translational Health Science and Technology Institute (THSTI), Faridabad, NCR, India. Before joining THSTI, he was working in NICED as the director. He has also served as the director of Laboratory Sciences Division at the International Center for Diarrhoeal Diseases Research, (ICDDR, B), Dhaka, Bangladesh.

== Education and career ==
He received BSc degree from Madras University in 1975 & MSc degree in Marine Biology in 1977 from Annamalai University, and acquired PhD from Annamalai University in 1982. He joined the Department of Microbiology, National Institute of Cholera and Enteric Diseases (NICED), Calcutta, a constituent Institute of the Indian Council of Medical Research and a WHO Collaborating Centre for Research and Training in Diarrhoeal Diseases, in 1981 and worked there till 5 April 2000, after which he took up his current assignment. He has been working on enteric pathogens with particular emphasis on Vibrio cholerae, the causative agent of the disease cholera.

== Research paths ==
In 1987–88, he did postdoctoral research on the heat-stable enterotoxin of V. cholerae with Tae Takeda in the Department of Infectious Diseases Research, National Children's Medical Research Center, Tokyo, Japan and in 1994–95 he did his sabbatical research on molecular epidemiology of V. cholerae at the Department of Microbiology, Kyoto University, with Yoshifumi Takeda. He was a visiting scientist at the Department of International Health, Johns Hopkins University, Baltimore, Maryland, in 1992 for three months, where he worked with David Sack and at the Laboratory Centre for Disease Control, Ottawa, Ontario, Canada in 1985 where he worked with Hermy Lior.

== Committee work ==
Nair is an elected member of the Subcommittee on the Taxonomy of Vibrionaceae, International Committee on Systematic Bacteriology from 1986. In August 1996 at the Jerusalem IUMS Congress, he was elected as the Secretary of this subcommittee. He was elected to the position of Member-at-Large of the International Union of Microbiological Societies (IUMS) at the Executive Board Meeting held on 7 July 1994 at Prague, Czech Republic and held this position until August 1999; he is the first Indian Microbiologist to be on the executive board of the IUMS. He was elected as the Fellow of the National Academy of Sciences, India (FNASc) in 1995, as Member of Guha Research Council (GRC) in 1997 and as Fellow of the Indian National Academy of Sciences (FNA) in 2002. On 30 April 2002, Nair was elected as a Foreign Associate of the National Academy of Sciences, USA and on 26 November 2004, he was elected as a Fellow of the Third World Academy of Sciences, Trieste, Italy, now renamed as the Academy of Sciences for the Developing Nations, in November 2004.

== Honours ==
Nair was awarded the Certificate of Merit by the Centers for Disease Control and Prevention (CDC), Atlanta, Georgia, in recognition and appreciation for his outstanding contribution to Public Health Education for Vibrio cholerae and Cholera in March 1994. On 5 January 1998 he was awarded the Professor S.C. Mahalanobis Memorial Award from the Physiological Society of India and delivered the Memorial Oration at the Indian Science Congress at Hyderabad. He was awarded the Shanti Swarup Bhatnagar Prize for Medical Sciences in 1998 for his contributions which led to the discovery of the new cholera causing serogroup now globally known as Vibrio cholerae O139 Bengal and for his contributions on describing a cell-rounding factor from strains of Vibrio cholerae.

== Literary career ==
Nair is on the editorial board of several journals, including Journal of Clinical Microbiology (Publication of the American Society of Microbiology), Epidemiology and Infection (Cambridge University Press), Microbes and Environment, Indian Journal of Medical Research, Indian Journal of Experimental Biology and the Indian Journal of Microbiology. Under the supervision of Nair, 25 students have obtained their doctoral degrees. He is the author of over 400 research papers in the area of Clinical Microbiology, Molecular Epidemiology and Molecular Pathogenesis of Enteric bacteria, including one of many in Nature.
