= Science Express =

Mobile scientific exhibition mounted on a train in India

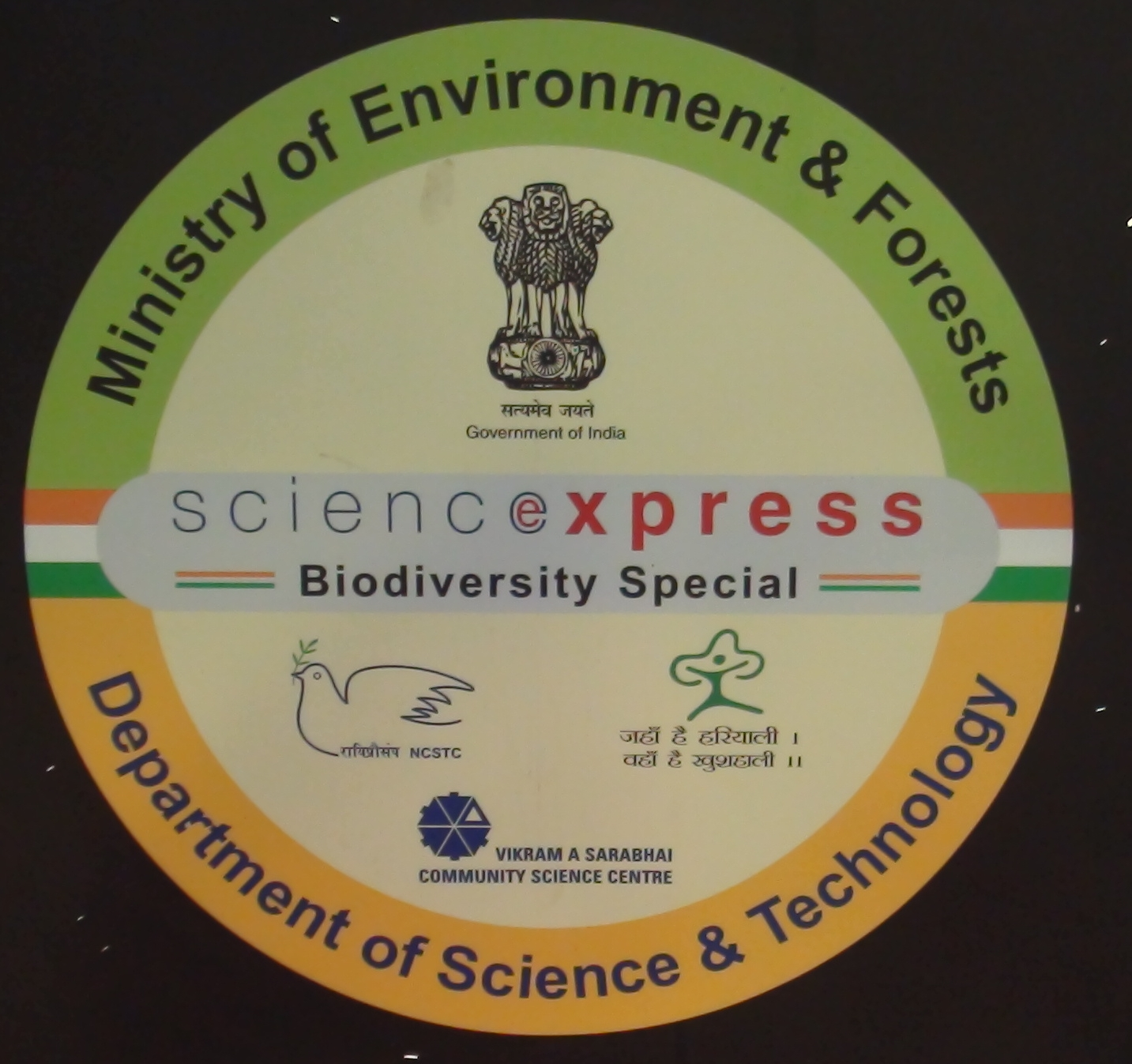
Science Express 2014 logo

The Science Express is a mobile scientific exhibition for children mounted on a train which travels across India. The project was launched on 30 October 2007 at the Safdarjung railway station, Delhi by the Department of Science and Technology (DST), Government of India. Although open to all, the project primarily targets students and teachers. As of 2017, the train has had nine phases and has showcased exhibitions on three themes. The first four phases from 2007 to 2011 were called "Science Express" and were focused on micro and macro cosmos. The next three phases from 2012 to 2014 remodelled the exhibits as "Biodiversity Special". The eighth and ninth phase from 2015 to 2017 was redesigned to focus on "Climate Change".

== Collaborations and exhibits ==
The project was initiated by the Department of Science and Technology (DST) in 2007 primarily focusing for students and teachers and has no entry fee. DST focused the first four phases on micro and macro cosmos and highlighted the developing newer researches being done in the fields of science and technology worldwide. It covered topics like the Big Bang, building blocks of life, genes, senses, and universe.

The second theme focused on biodiversity within India and was modeled jointly by DST and Ministry of Environment, Forest and Climate Change (MoEFCC). It covered the diverse aspects of life in Trans-Himalayan and the Himalayan regions, the Gangetic Plains, the North Easterns hilly areas, the deserts, the coastal Western Ghats, the Deccan Plateau, and various islands. A "Kids Zone" was also introduced for fun activities like puzzles and games related to science.

The third theme was designed for Climate Change and was developed as collaborative work between DST, MoEFCC, Department of Biotechnology (DBT), Ministry of Railways, Vikram A Sarabhai Community Science Centre (VASCSC) and Wildlife Institute of India (WII). The ninth phase of the exhibition had 16 coaches of which eight were developed by MoEFCC. Solar panels have been installed on rooftop of some coaches and facilities to train teachers is also available. A team from the VASCSC, which manages the entire exhibit, guides students through the exhibition and also engages into activities on the railway platform. Dilip Sarkar, executive director of VASCSC said that the exhibit aims to "transform the vehicle into a people's movement and motivate them to take individual actions to fight climate change".

The exhibition while in its eighth phase had travelled for 142,000 kilometres (88,000 mi) and halted at 455 stations together. In over 1,600 days for which it has been exhibited it has been visited by nearly 1.5 crore (15 million) people with students from over 33,800 schools. The exhibition thus held record of being the largest, the longest running and the most visited exhibition as noted in the Limca Book of Records.

== Statistics ==
Indicates ongoing tour

| Theme | Phase | Duration | Approx. distance covered | Halts | Ref. |
|---|---|---|---|---|---|
| Science Express | 1 | 30 Oct 2007 – 4 June 2008 | 15,000 kilometres (9,300 mi) | 57 | |
| Science Express | 2 | 30 Nov 2008 – 30 May 2009 | 17,000 kilometres (11,000 mi) | 51 | |
| Science Express | 3 | 2 Oct 2009 – 27 Apr 2010 | 18,000 kilometres (11,000 mi) | 56 | |
| Science Express | 4 | 4 Dec 2010 – 16 Jun 2011 | 18,000 kilometres (11,000 mi) | 57 | |
| Biodiversity Special | 5 | 5 Jun 2012 – 13 Jan 2013 | 18,000 kilometres (11,000 mi) | 52 | |
| Biodiversity Special | 6 | 9 Apr 2013 – 28 Oct 2013 | 19,000 kilometres (12,000 mi) | 62 | |
| Biodiversity Special | 7 | 28 Jul 2014 – 06 Feb 2015 | 17,000 kilometres (11,000 mi) | 56 | |
| Climate Change | 8 | 15 Oct 2015 – 7 May 2016 | 19,800 kilometres (12,300 mi) | 64 | |
| Climate Change | 9 | 17 Feb 2017 – 8 Sep 2017 | 19,000 kilometres (12,000 mi) | 74 | |

== Gallery ==
Science Express

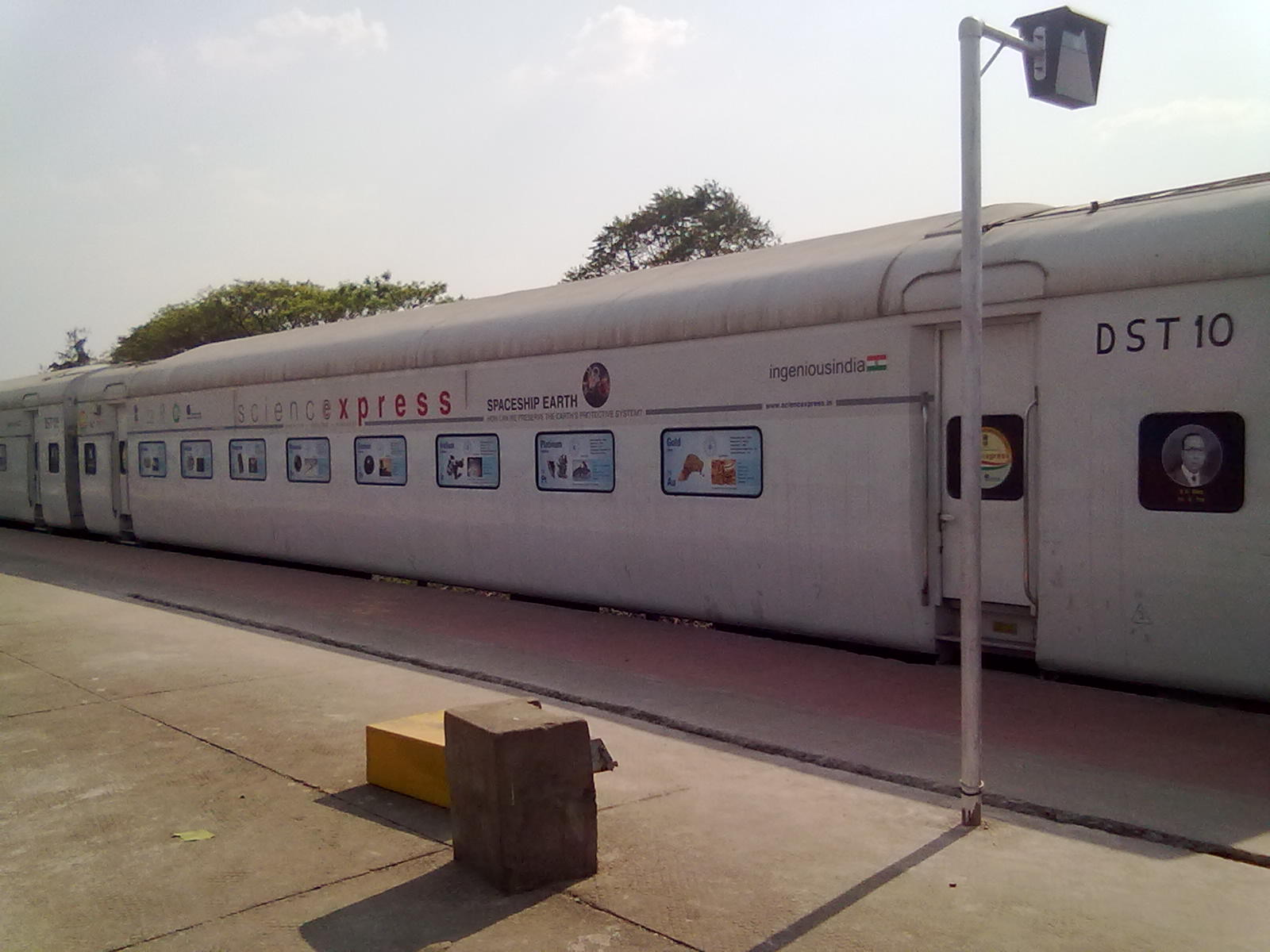
Science Express at Rayagada, Odisha in 2011

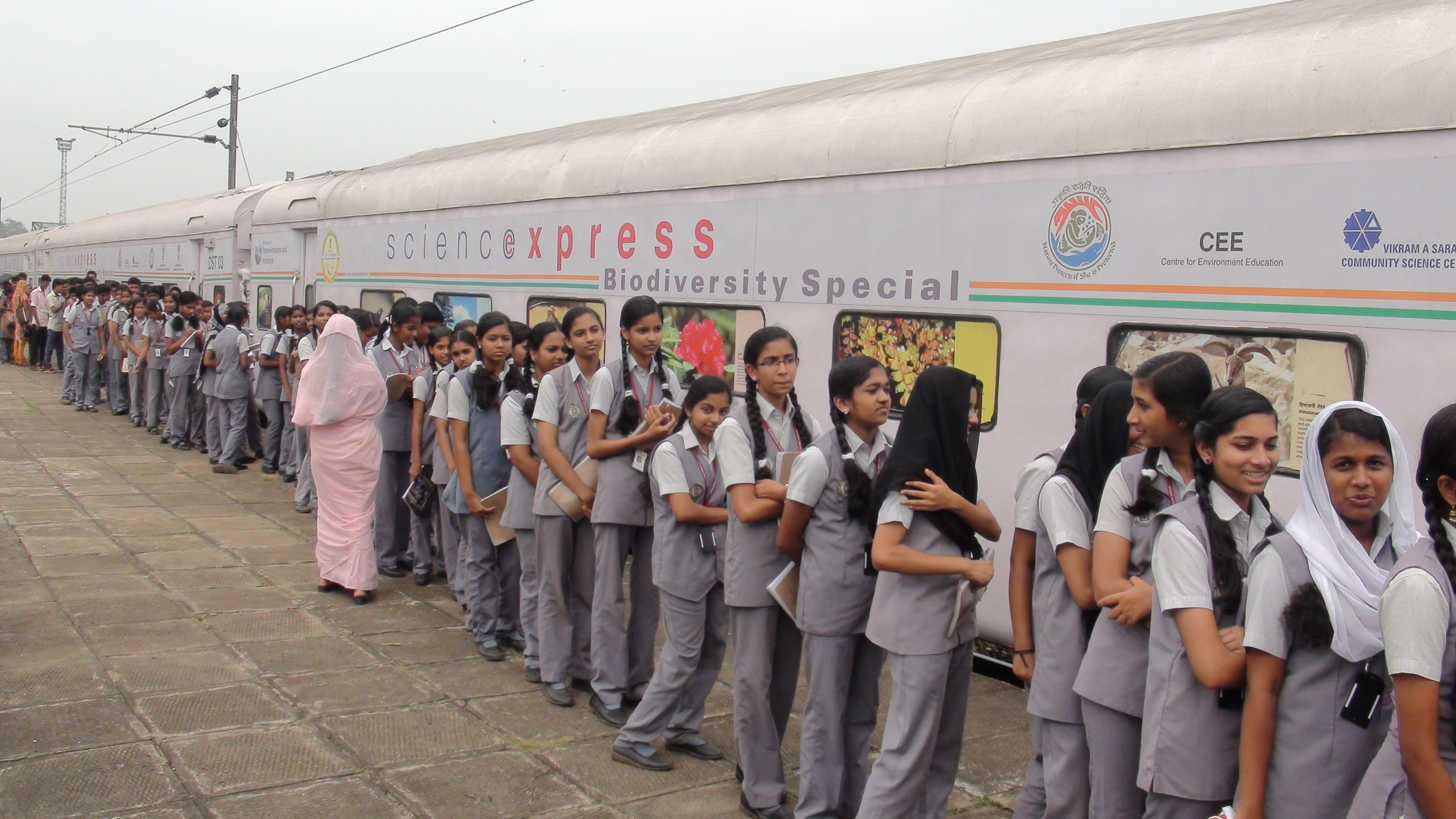
Students queue outside the train in 2014

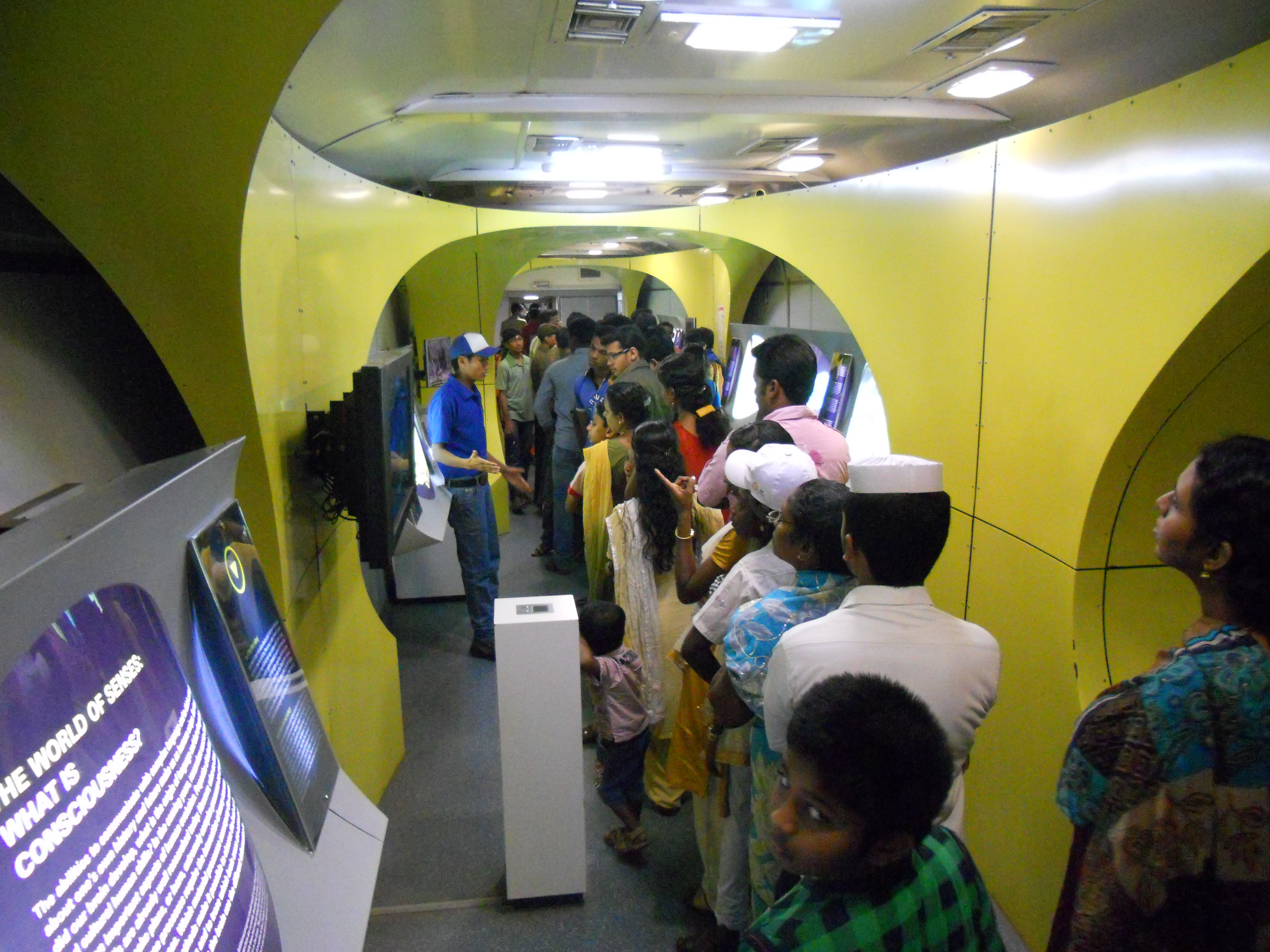
Interior of the exhibition in 2011

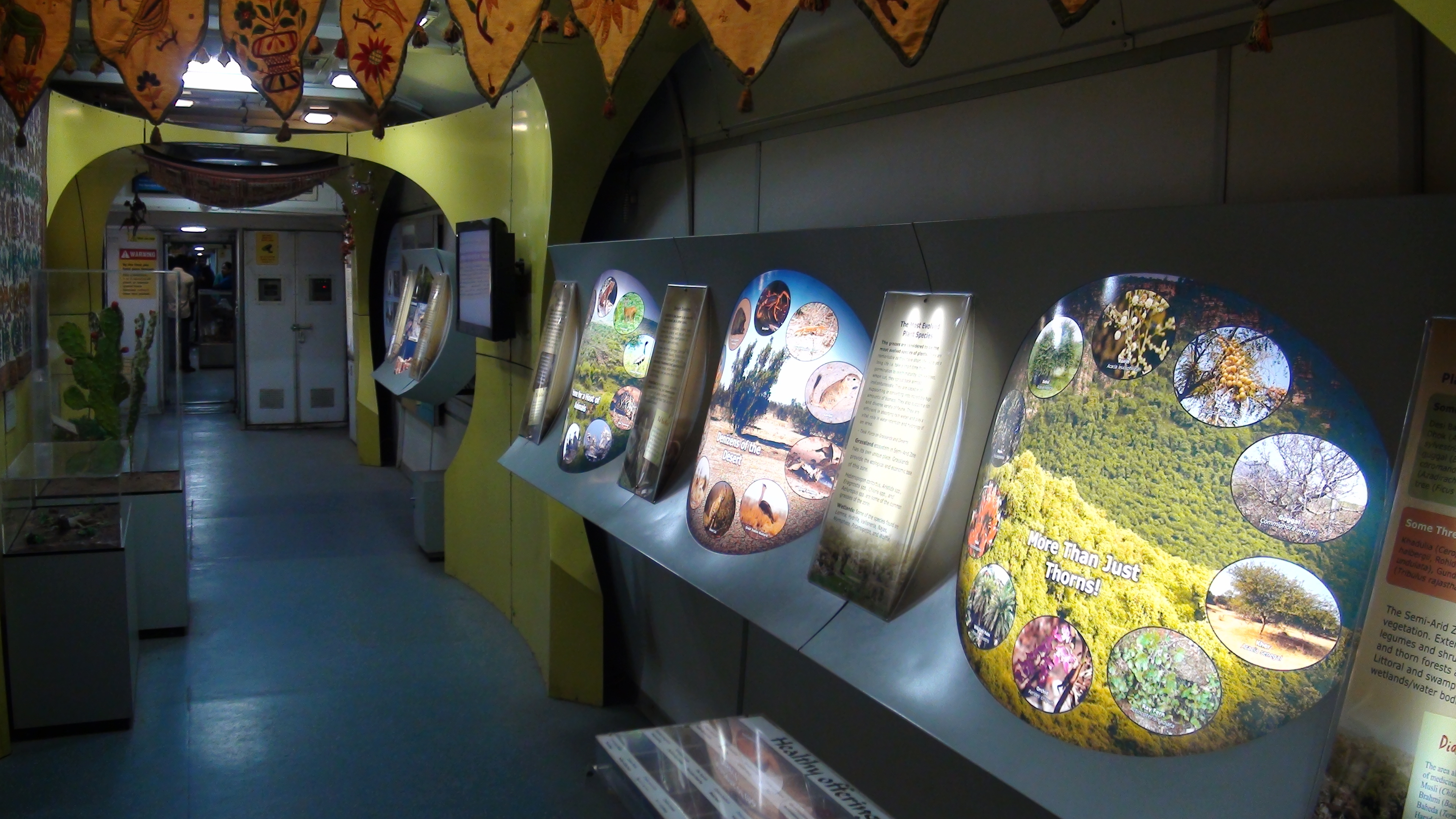
Exhibits of the Biodiversity Special in 2014

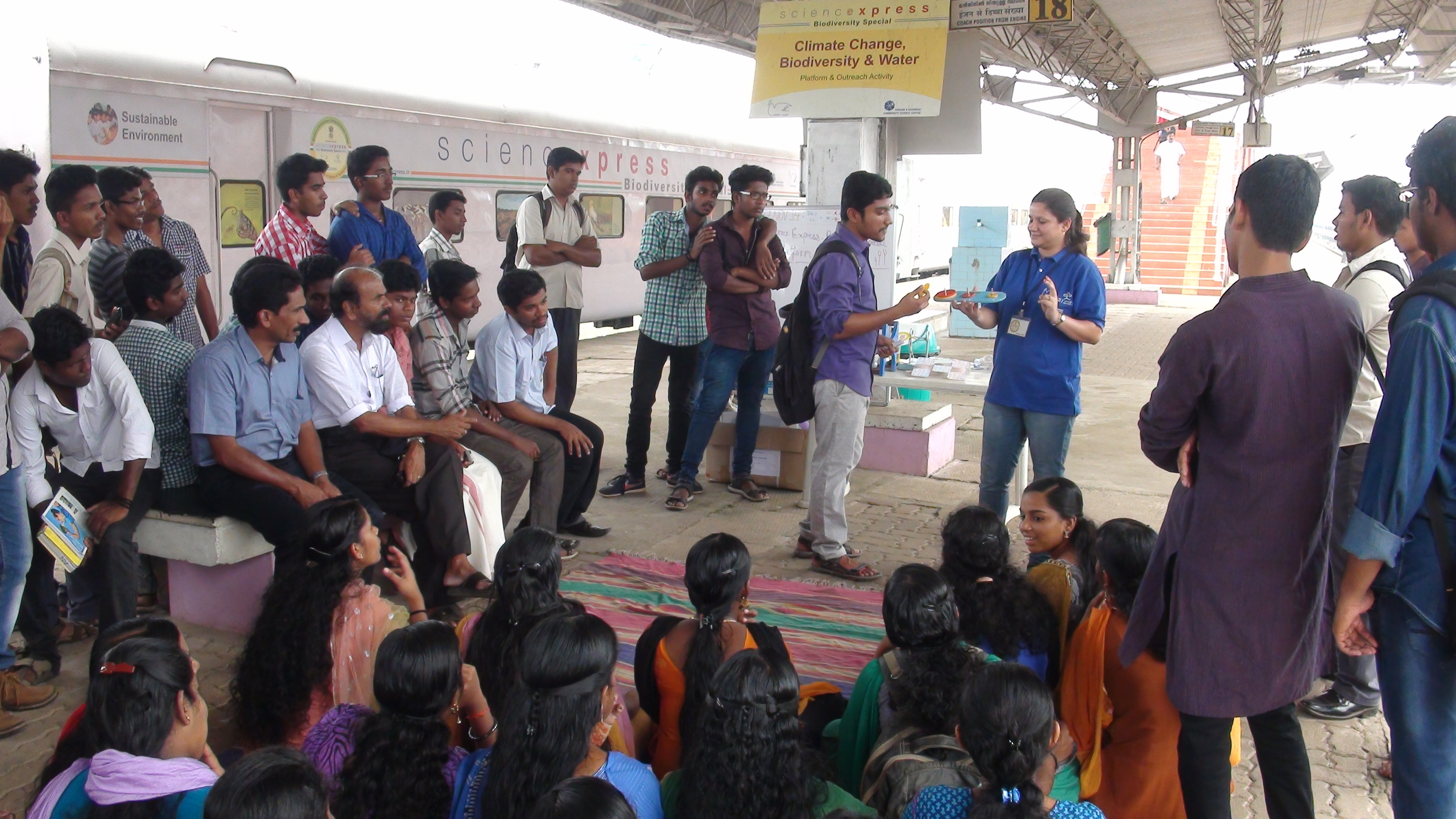
Activities conducted on the railway platform for the visitors
