= National Science Day =

Holiday in India

- Official name: National Science Day
- Also called: Science Day
- Observed by: India
- Type: National
- Significance: Commemorate the discovery of Raman effect
- Observances: Celebrations in Government, Public and Private Institutions
- Begins: 28 February
- Ends: 28 February
- Date: 28 February
- Next time: 28 February 2027
- Duration: 1 day sometimes a week
- Frequency: Annual
- First time: February 28th, 1987
- Started by: Proposed by the National Council for Science and Technology Communication (NCSTC) Accepted by the Indian Government
- Related to: National Science Week

National Science Day is celebrated in India on February 28 each year to mark the discovery of the Raman effect by Indian physicist Sir C. V. Raman on 28 February 1928.

For his discovery, Sir C.V. Raman was awarded the Nobel Prize in Physics in 1930.

== History of National Science Day ==
=== Contribution (History) ===
National Science Day is celebrated in India on 28 February every year. It marks the discovery of the Raman Effect by Indian physicist Sir C. V. Raman on 28 February 1928. To honor this achievement and promote scientific awareness, the Government of India declared 28 February as National Science Day in 1986. The day highlights the importance of science and encourages scientific thinking among students and citizens.

== Celebration of National Science Day ==
The occasion of National Science Day is marked by numerous events conducted by institutions such as schools and colleges.

== Celebration of India Space Week ==
India Space Week is celebrated in India every year on 12 to 18 August. The celebration also includes public speeches, radio, TV, Space science movies, Space science exhibitions based on themes and concepts, debates, quiz competitions, lectures, science model exhibitions and many more activities.

Indian Space Week consists of space education and outreach events held by space agencies, aerospace companies, schools, Collage, university, NGO, planetarium, museums, and astronomy clubs around the National in a common timeframe. India Space Week is coordinated by the India Nation with the support of the India Space Week Association (ISWA). The ISWA leads a global team of National Coordinators, who promote the celebration of India Space Week within their own countries. The ISA AND IICT declared in 2022 that India Space Week will be held each year on the Celebration of birth of 12-18 August Vikram Sarabhai.

== Objectives of Celebrating National Science Day ==
National Science Day is celebrated to spread a message about the importance of science used in the daily life of the people. To display all the activities, efforts and achievements in the field of science for human welfare. It is celebrated to discuss all the issues and implement new technologies for the development in the field of science. To give an opportunity to the scientific minded citizens in India. To encourage the people as well as popularize science and technology.

== Themes of National Science Day ==
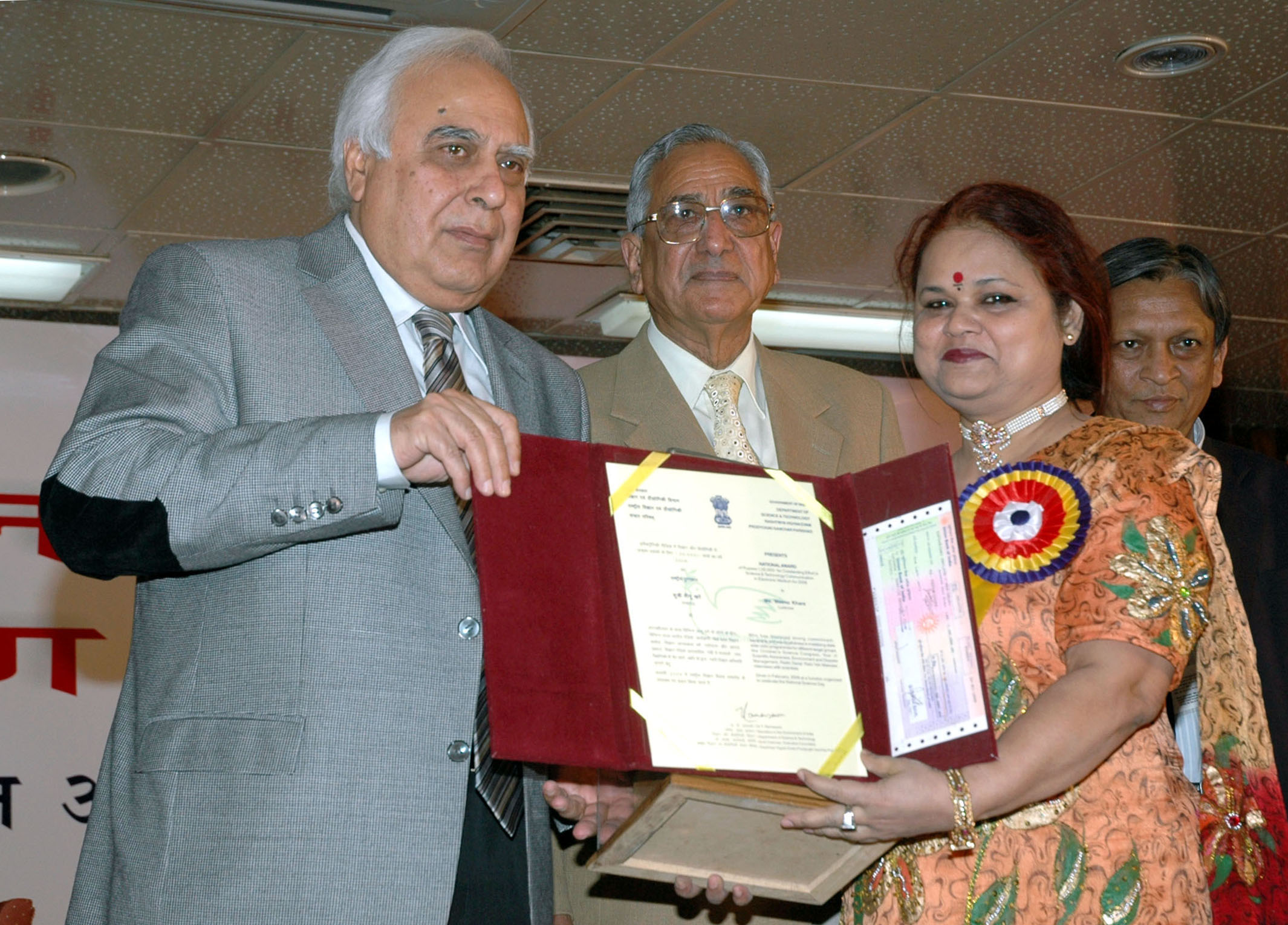
Meenu Khare receiving the National Award from Kapil Sibal.

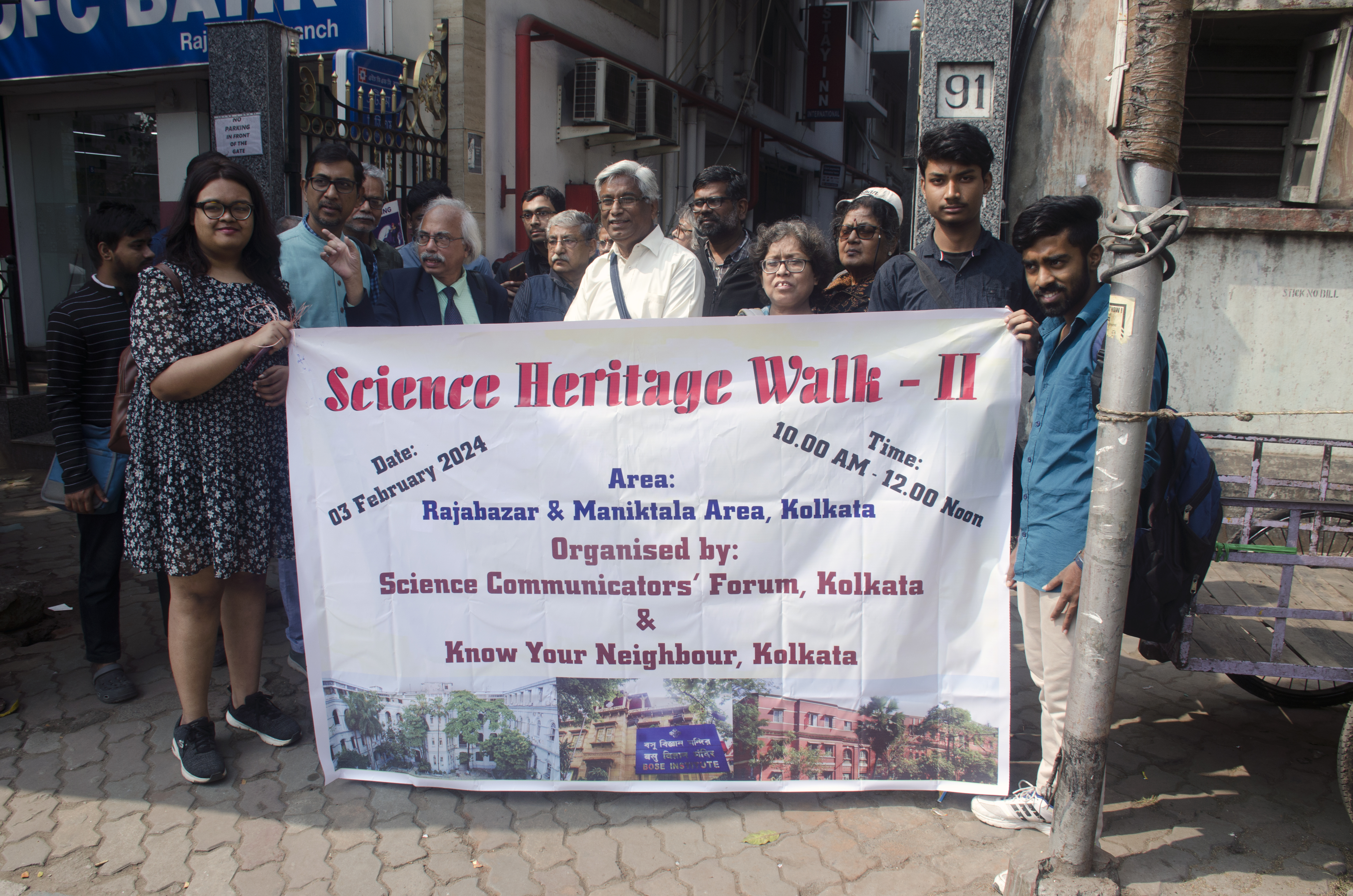
Science walk participants to commemorate National Science Day 2024 at Rajabazar Science College

The theme of the year 1999 was “Our Changing Earth”.

The theme of the year 2000 was “Recreating Interest in Basic Science”.

The theme of the year 2001 was “Information Technology for Science Education”.

The theme of the year 2002 was “Wealth From Waste”.

The theme of the year 2003 was “50 years of DNA & 25 years of IVF – The Blue print of Life”.

The theme of the year 2004 was “Encouraging Scientific Awareness in Community”.

The theme of the year 2005 was “Celebrating Physics”.

The theme of the year 2006 was “Nurture Nature for our future”.

The theme of the year 2007 was “More Crop Per Drop”.

The theme of the year 2008 was “Understanding the Planet Earth”.

The theme of the year 2009 was “Expanding Horizons of Science”. On 28 February 2009, five institutions in India were presented the 'National Award for Science Communication' by the Indian Department of Science and Technology (IDST). These awards are presented to recognize the efforts of individuals and government and non-government bodies for the popularization of science in India. The highest award was given in 2009 to the Vikram Sarabhai Community Science Centre for its contribution to science-related learning material and conducting training programs on science education. A Festival of Measurement and Space Fair was held at the Nehru Planetarium, New Delhi. Dr. Pramod Kumar Mohapatra, G.S. Unnikrishnan Nair and Ms. Meenu Khare were awarded ₹1,00,000 for their individual contributions to the field. Jidnyasa Trust of Thane also received ₹1,00,000 for setting up a science activity center. It is to make people aware about the science and technology.

The theme of the year 2010 was “Gender Equity, Science & Technology for Sustainable Development”.

The theme of the year 2011 was “Chemistry in Daily Life”.

The theme of the year 2012 was “Clean Energy Options and Nuclear Safety”. As India observed National Science Day on 28 February, the citizens saw a slew of activities at Science City which had planned a five-day Science Carnival on theme of youth and science. "The Science Carnival is going to be an event with a series of scientific activities and programs involving school and college students, eminent scientists and faculties of the state and country. We want to provide a real platform for budding scientists to make their career and profession in science," said a senior Science City official. Officials said that they are expecting nearly 1 Lakh students and science enthusiasts to visit Science City during this period.

- India Space Week
- National Mathematics Year
- National Mathematics Day
- National Science Week
- National Council of Science Museums

The theme of the year 2013 was “Genetically Modified Crops and Food Security”.

The theme of the year 2014 was “Fostering Scientific Temper”.

The theme of the year 2015 was “Science for Nation Building”.

The theme of the year 2016 was on "Scientific Issues for Development of the Nation".

The theme of the year 2017 was "Science and Technology for Specially Abled Persons"

The theme of the year 2018 was "Science and Technology for a sustainable future."

The theme of the year 2019 was "Science for the People, and the People for Science"

The theme of the year 2020 was "Women in Science."

The theme of the year 2021 was 'Future of STI: Impact on Education Skills and Work'.

The theme of the year 2022 is 'Integrated Approach in S&T for Sustainable Future'.

The theme for National science Day celebrated on 28 February 2023 is "Global Science for Global Wellbeing".

The theme of the year 2024 was "Indigenous Technologies for Viksit Bharat" A series of events were held across the country.
Kolkata: A series of programs were held across the city. This included one in Birla Industrial & Technological Museum with school children. The celebration also included a series of three science walk initiaated by Know Your Neighbour (KYN) and executed by Science Communicators’ Forum (SCF). The first walks was held on January 14 in College Street area. The second one was held on February 3 in Rajabazar area. The third and final walk was held on 28 February in Jadavpur area.

The theme for National science Day celebrated on 28 February 2025 is "Empowering Indian Youth for Global Leadership in Science & lnnovation for Viksit Bharat".

The theme for National science Day celebrated on 28 February 2026 is "'Women in Science: Catalysing Viksit Bharat'
