= Centre for Nano and Soft Matter Sciences =

Research institute in India

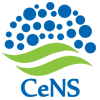
- Nickname: CeNS
- Established: 1991; 31 years ago
- Field of research: Nanotechnology, Soft matter
- Director: Dr BLV Prasad
- Location: Arkavathi, Survey No.7, Shivanapura, Dasanapura Hobli, Bengaluru - 562162 Karnataka, India, Bengaluru, India (headquarters)
- Operating agency: Ministry of Science and Technology, Government of India
- Website: www.cens.res.in

The Centre for Nano and Soft Matter Sciences (CeNS) is an Indian research institute that works with the Ministry of Science and Technology, Government of India.

== History ==
The Centre for Nano and Soft Matter Sciences (CeNS) was established in 1991 by Sivaramakrishna Chandrasekhar. In 2021, Dr BLV Prasad appointed as director.

== Research activities ==
=== Materials research ===
CeNS was involved in materials research, encompassing various length scales. exploration of a wide range of materials, metal and semiconductor nanostructures, liquid crystals, gels, membranes, and hybrid materials. CeNS made contributions to addressing the challenges posed by COVID-19 in India.

=== Electrochromic smart window ===
In 2022, CeNS engineered a polymeric electrochromic smart window, as an alternative to costly conventional smart windows in contemporary architectural structures.
