= Vikram A Sarabhai Community Science Centre =

Science organization in Gujarat, India

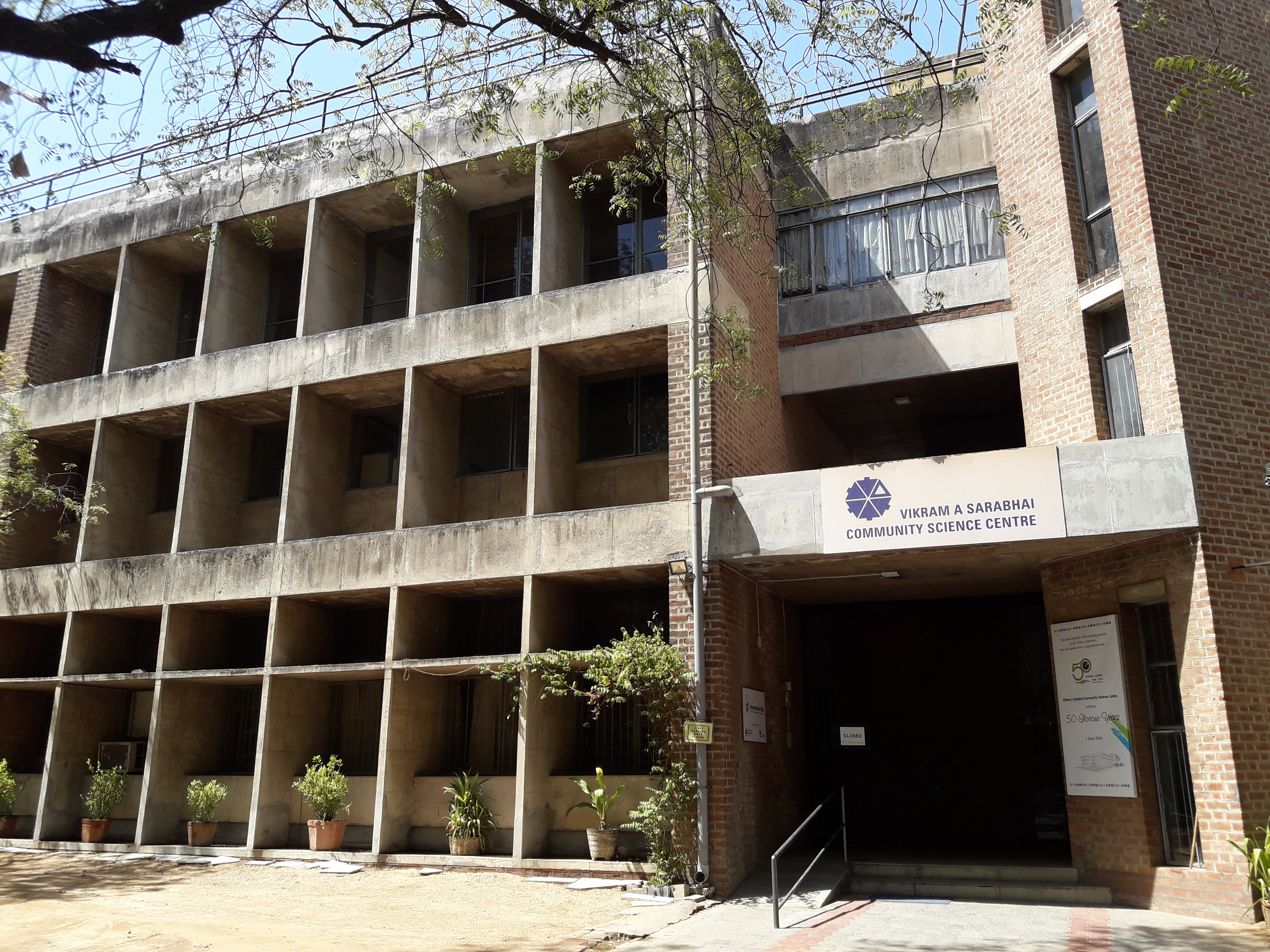
- Building of VASCSC
- Abbreviation: VASCSC or CSC
- Formation: 1966
- Founder: Vikram Sarabhai
- Type: NGO
- Legal status: Not-for-profit Organization registered as Society
- Headquarters: Ahmedabad
- Location: Ahmedabad, Gujarat, India
- Chairman: K Kasturirangan
- Executive Director: Dilip Surkar
- Website: www.vascsc.org

Vikram A Sarabhai Community Science Centre, commonly known as VASCSC, was established in the 1960s by the eminent space scientist, Vikram Sarabhai in Ahmedabad, Gujarat, India.

== History ==
VASCSC was started to give quality science education and to try new ideas and method for teaching science. It started out as the Physical Research Laboratory (PRL), Ahmedabad's "Group for Improvement of Science Education (GISE)" in 1963.

In 1966, the Community Science Center (CSC) started operating as a separate workspace at its present site. After the founder died in 1971, it was renamed "Vikram A Sarabhai Community Science Centre (VASCSC)" to honor him.

=== Mandate and role ===
The centre works towards popularising science and mathematics education among students, teachers and the public. Its mandate is to stimulate interest, encourage and expose the principles of science and scientific method and also to improve and find innovative methods of science education. It is located opposite Gujarat University. VASCSC is open to all members of the community.

== Objectives ==
- encourage students, teachers, and the general public to: • understand the basic concepts of science and STEM education; • acquire scientific knowledge and insights as much as possible through the process of inquiry through experiment, audio-visual media, and other means; • be able to solve problems;
- stimulate interest in the principles of science and scientific method among students in elementary and secondary schools as well as colleges by providing them with the necessary encouragement and exposure;
- be concerned with the role of education and ways to improve science education in relation to the individual and the community at large; and help
- clarify the social implications of science and technology.

== Associated scientists ==
- C. V. Raman
- P. C. Vaidya
- Pisharoth Rama Pisharoty
- M. S. Swaminathan
- K. R. Ramanathan
- A. P. J. Abdul Kalam
- Yash Pal
- M. G. K. Menon
- A. R. Rao

== Activities ==
- Enhancing the capacity of schools to improve quality of STEM education
- Conducting STEM outreach programs for students
- Implementing STEM Hands-on teachers’ training programs
- Establishing STEM labs in schools to promote STEM Hands-on learning,
- Advocating the integration of emerging technologies in school education
- Developing innovative teaching learning material (TLM)

== Facilities ==
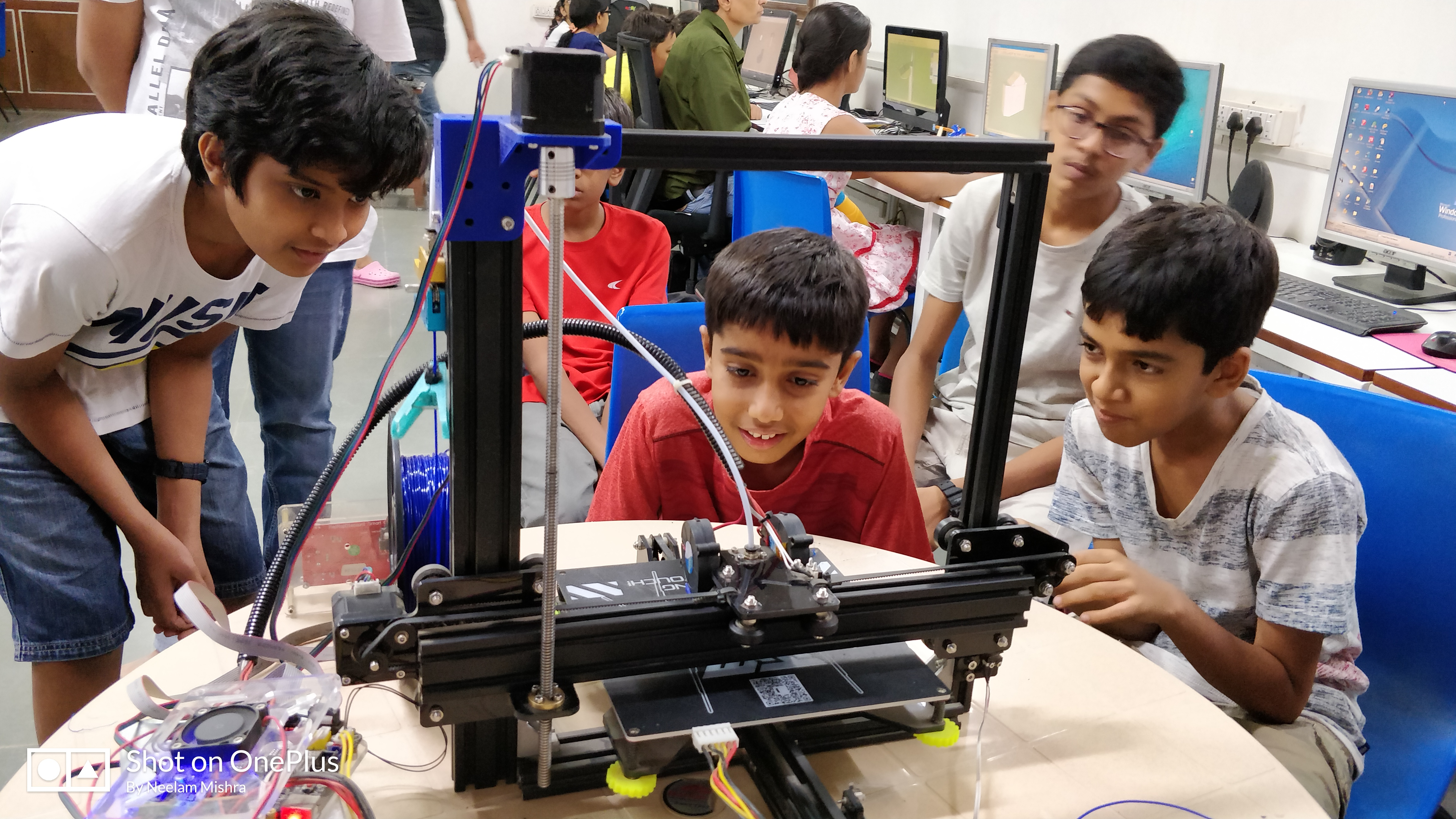

- Laboratories (Physics, Chemistry, Biology, Mathematics, Electronics, Computers, Astronomy, Model Rocketry, Emerging Technologies)
- Library
- Quadrangle (open exhibition area)
- Science Shop
- Vigyan Drashti
- TLM Workshop

== Vigyan Drashti ==
The Gujarati biweekly science wall magazine Vigyan Drashti is produced as an eight-page, full-color newspaper. It includes science pictures, puzzles, crosswords, exercises, experiments, articles, and fascinating scientific information. The magazine is frequently used by both private subscribers and schools as an educational tool in Gujarati. Every year, six volumes are released.

== Major projects ==
- Science Express (2007-17)
- Mobile Science Lab

== Board of Governors ==
- Shri B. S. Bhatia — Member
- Prof. Barjor Mehta — Member
- Shri Chander Mohan — Member
- Ms. Pallavi Patel — Member
- Ms. Meenalochani Raghunathan — Member
- Shri Kartikeya V. Sarabhai — Member
- Shri Mohal Sarabhai — Member
- Dr. Abhijit Sen — Member
- Dr. Minal Sen — Member
- Dr. Anamik Shah — Member
- Shri Divyesh Surati — Member
- Shri Dilip Surkar — Member Secretary
- Shri Pradyumna Vyas — Member

== Awards and recognitions ==
- Mahatma Award 2023 for Social Good and Impact
- HCL Grant 2020 finalist, selected through a competitive nation-wide process, received grant for a project to be carried out in the following year
- Times of India Social Impact Award 2011 for Education
- National Award for Outstanding Efforts in Science and Technology Communication from Dept. of Science and Technology, NCSTC, Govt. of India (2008)
- National Award for Best Efforts in Science Popularization among Children’ from Dept. of Science and Technology, NCSTC, Govt. of India (1994)
