= National Council for Science and Technology Communication =

The National Council for Science and Technology Communication (NCSTC) is a scientific programme of the Government of India for the popularisation of science, dissemination of scientific knowledge and inculcation of scientific temper. Established under the Department of Science and Technology, it "is mandated to communicate Science and Technology to masses, stimulate scientific and technological temper and coordinate and orchestrate such efforts throughout the country." Following the science communication plan introduced in the Sixth Five-Year Plan of India, NCSTC was established in 1982.

== Objectives ==
NCSTC has three major objectives:

1. For developing a building capacity for informed decision and promote scientific thinking to the Indian communities.
2. For the development of society using scientific knowledge and organise programmes using different media to reach every citizen.
3. To conduct outreach activities, including training in science and technology communication, awareness programmes, dissemination of scientific knowledge, award incentives, promote scientific research, develop international co-operation, while providing special attention to women.

== History ==
The Government of India in its Sixth Five-Year Plan in 1980 introduced an elaborate scheme for the promotion of science and technology. It constituted a Cabinet Committee on Science and Technology (CCST) on 3 March 1981. Chaired by Prime Minister Indira Gandhi, the committee created Science Advisory Committee to the Cabinet (SACC). Following the proposals by SACC, three scientific bodies were established in 1982:

1. National Biotechnology Board (NBTB) for the development applications of biotechnology such as agriculture, medicine and industry.
2. National Science and Technology Entrepreneurship Development Board (NSTEDB) to promote employment among people in science and technology.
3. National Council for Science and Technology Communication (NCSTC) for popularisation and development of scientific temper among the people.

The council officially started functioning in 1984. As its first major activity, NCSTC organised the first national science festival of India named Bharat Jan Vigyan Jatha (Life of Science in India) in 1987.

== Activities ==
The major activities of NCSTC are organising:

- Bharat Jan Vigyan Jatha, held in 1987 and 1992 in which science educators visit in villages to spread scientific awareness. It is considered as "the biggest science communication experiment anywhere in the world."
- National Children's Science Congress, an annual conference started in 1993 to develop and promote scientific knowledge among children of 10–17 years of age.
- National Science Day, held every year on 28 February, a nation-wide observation of the day of discovery of the Raman effect in 1928.
- National Teachers’ Science Congress (NTSC), a biennial conference for science teachers and scientists, started in 2003.

=== Awards ===
The council gives the following awards to science students, teachers and populisers on National Science Day:

- National Award for Outstanding Effort in Science and Technology Communication through Innovative and Traditional Methods, which carries INR 200,000.
- National Award for Outstanding Effort in Science and Technology Communication through Print Media including Books and Magazines, which carries INR 100,000.
- National Award for Outstanding Effort in Science and Technology Popularization among Children, which carries INR 100,000.
- National Award for Outstanding Effort in Translation of Popular Science and Technology Literature, which carries INR 100,000.
- National Award for Outstanding Effort in Science and Technology Communication in the Print Medium, which carries INR 100,000.
- National Award for Outstanding Effort in Science and Technology Communication in the Electronic Medium, which carries INR 100,000.
