= Ramanuja Vijayaraghavan =

Indian physicist

- Born: 3 January 1931 (age 95)
- Education: Annamalai University; Tata Institute of Fundamental Research
- Awards: Shanti Swarup Bhatnagar Award 1976; UGC Raman Award in Physical Sciences 1983
- Scientific career
- Fields: Physics
- Workplaces: Tata Institute of Fundamental Research

Ramanuja Vijayaraghavan (born 3 January 1931) is an Indian physicist, specializing in condensed matter physics.

Vijayaraghavan pioneered active research in the areas of metal physics, magnetic resonance in biophysical systems, and fine particle physics, a forerunner to nanoscience. He is a fellow of several science academies and twice elected as a member of the International Union of Pure and Applied Physics commission on magnetism.

== Early life ==
He was born in a well-off family. He was the grandson of Mahawidwan R. Raghava Iyengar, a renowned Tamil and Sanskrit scholar of the 20th century.

== Career ==
After graduating from the Annamalai University in 1951, he joined the Tata Institute of Fundamental Research (TIFR) at Bombay as a Research Student, eventually rising to the position of Distinguished Professor and Dean (Physics Faculty). He formally retired in 1996 . He was deputed twice by the International Atomic Energy Agency (IAEA), Vienna, Austria, as an Expert to set up the Magnetic Resonance Laboratory at the Atomic Energy Centre, Yogyakarta, Indonesia. He was awarded an Indian National Science Academy Senior Scientist position from 1996 to 2001, during which he worked at SAMEER, Mumbai, in collaboration with TIFR. In the 1950s, he constructed a crossed circle wide line NMR spectrometer which could detect deuterium and oxygen-17 isotopes in their natural abundance. Using oxygen-17 as a probe, he demonstrated chemical shifts in organic liquids due to electronic bonding. He subsequently developed an interdisciplinary group which used NMR and susceptibility measurements in metals to show that susceptibility and the hyperfine field at the nucleus were related and could be modified by alloying. The oscillatory nature of the conduction electron polarisation was established in rare earth alloys. The findings from experiments performed in bulk samples of transition metals, rare earths, Heusler alloys and spin glass were related to results obtained from microscopic techniques such as NMR, Mossbauer and neutron diffraction. In 1986, his group organized one of the first international conferences on high Tc superconductors. He and his collaborators, are credited with the discovery of superconductivity in borocarbides with magnetic elements (under the leadership of R. Nagarajan and L. C. Gupta) and new valence fluctuating materials, heavy fermions, rare earth magnetism phenomena and highly correlated electron systems. His group also made early contributions to the detection of tumors by magnetic resonance.

As a tribute to his contribution to physics, two felicitation volumes were published in 1991 on the occasion of his 60th birthday: Frontiers in solid state series, Superconductivity (Vol.1), and Magnetism (Vol. 2), by World Scientific Publishing, in Singapore. These volumes incorporate articles written by leading international scientists, including Nobel laureates.

Vijayaraghavan was conferred the prestigious Shanti Swarup Bhatnagar Award in 1976, and received the UGC Raman award in Physical Sciences in 1983. Apart from science, he is well versed in Hindu philosophy and Tamil literature.
