= Department of Science and Technology (India) =

Indian government agency

Department of Science & Technology
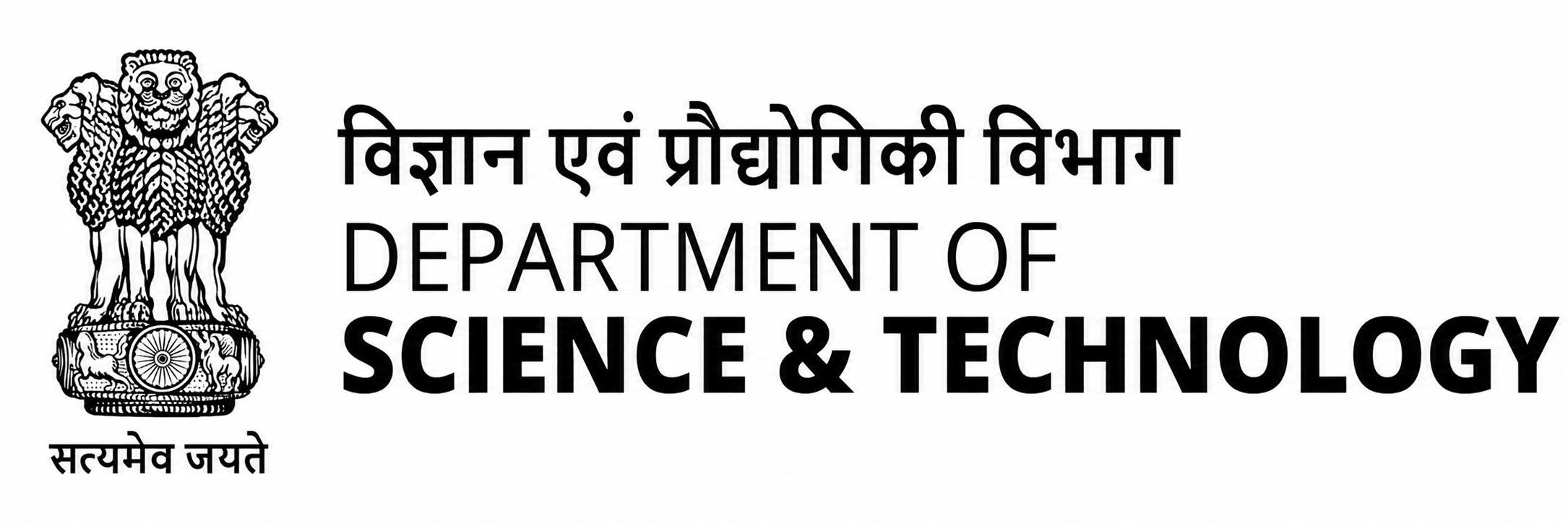

Central Government of India overview
- Formed: May 3, 1971; 55 years ago
- Jurisdiction: India
- Headquarters: New Delhi
- Annual budget: ₹38,260.94 crore (US$4.0 billion) (for the Financial Year 2026–27)
- Minister responsible: Jitendra Singh, Minister of Science and Technology
- Central Government of India executive: Umesh Waghmare, Secretary
- Parent department: Ministry of Science and Technology
- Website: dst.gov.in

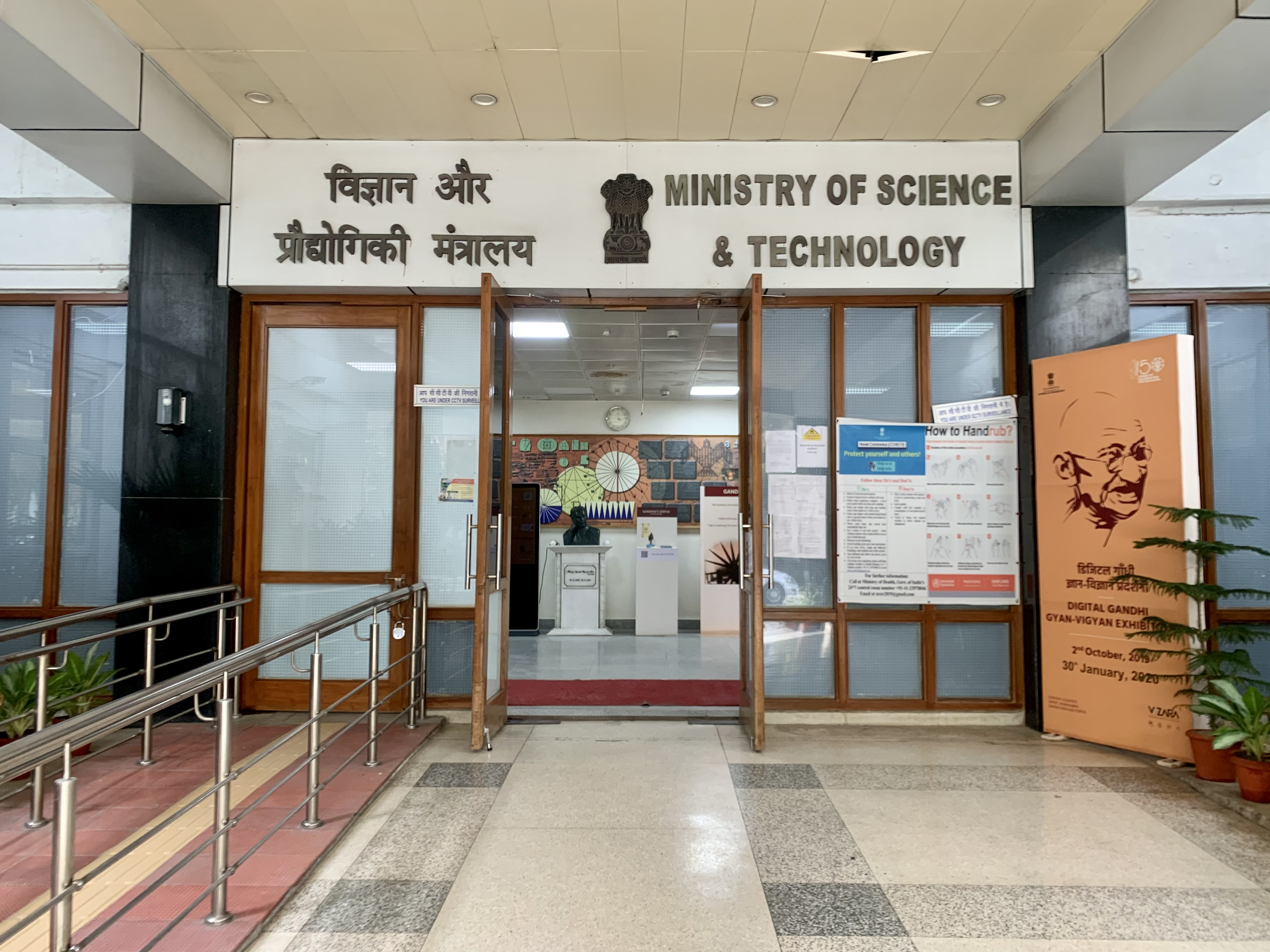
DST Headquarter, Technology Bhavan, New Delhi

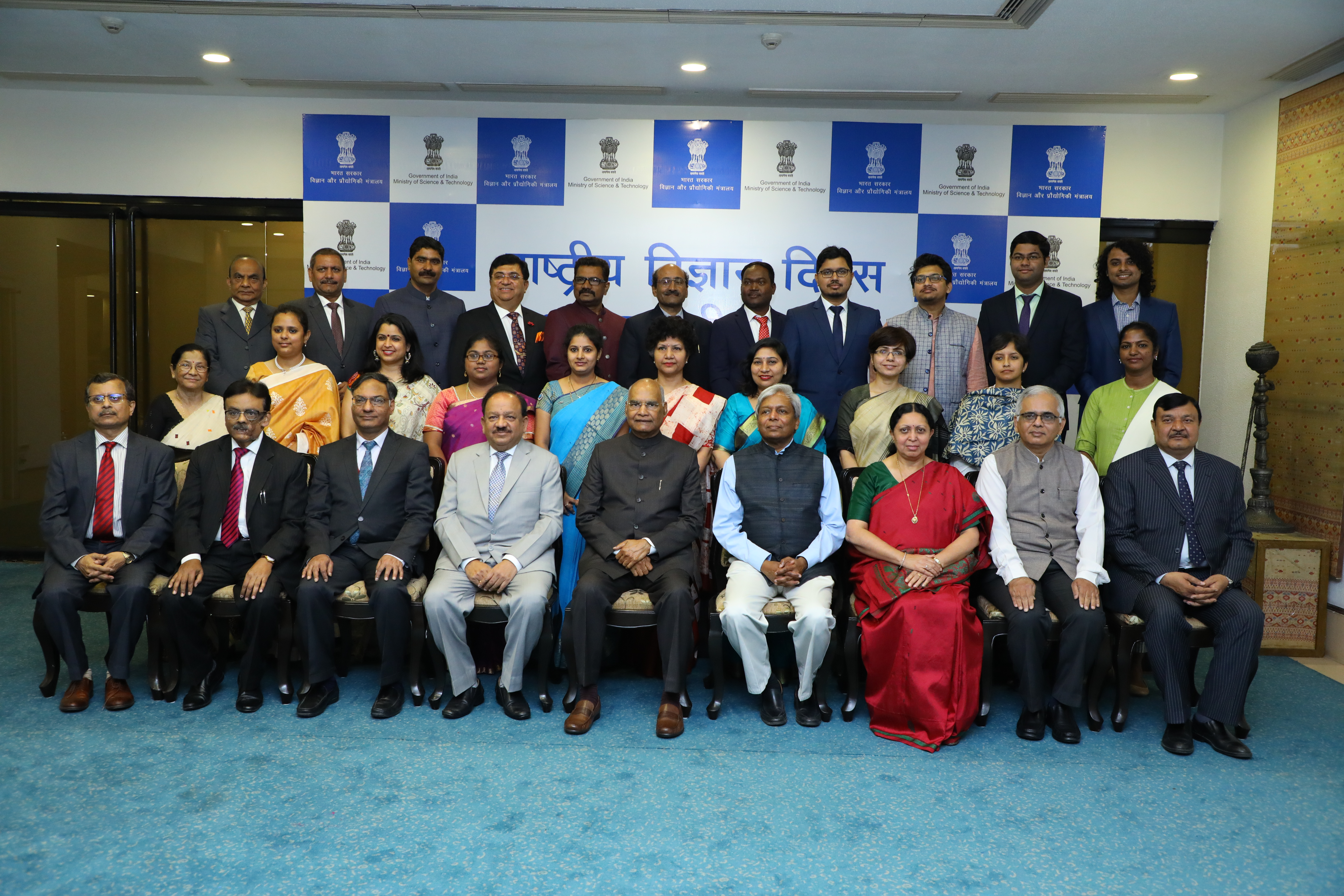
President of India, on National Science Day 2020, New Delhi

The Department of Science and Technology (DST) is a department within the Ministry of Science and Technology in India. It was established in May 1971 to promote new areas of science and technology and to play the role of a nodal department for organising, coordinating and promoting scientific and technological activities in the country. It gives funds to various approved scientific projects in India. It also supports various researchers in India to attend conferences abroad and to go for experimental works.

== Open access ==
The Department of Science and Technology (DST) supports open access to scientific knowledge, originated from the public-funded research in India. In December 2014, the DST and the Department of Biotechnology (DBT), Government of India, had jointly adopted their Open Access Policy.

== Scientific Programmes ==
DST Scientific Programmes
Sr. No.	Group	Scientific Programmes
1	Scientific & Engineering Research	Mega Facilities for Basic Research; Innovation in Science Pursuit for Inspired Research (INSPIRE) programme; R&D Infrastructure (FIST, SAIFs, PURSE, SATHI); Science and Technology of Yoga and Meditation (SATYAM); Programme for Science Students; Swarnajayanti Fellowships; National Science & Technology Management Information System (NSTMIS); Science and Engineering Research Board(SERB); Cognitive Science Research Initiative (CSRI); VAJRA (Visiting Advanced Joint Research) Faculty Scheme
2	Technology Development	Technical Research Centres Programme; Technology Development and Transfer; National Good Laboratory Practice Compliance Monitoring Authority (NGCMA); Natural Resources Data Management System (NRDMS); Climate Change Programme; Joint programme on Electric Mobility and Technology Foresighting; Interdisciplinary Cyber Physical Systems (ICPS) Division; Patent Facilitation Programme (PFP)
3	International S&T Cooperation	Bilateral Cooperation with developed and developing countries; Multilateral & Regional Cooperation; Thematic Cooperation
4	S&T for Socio Economic Programme	National Council for Science and Technology Communication (NCSTC); Science For Equity Empowerment and Development (SEED); National Science & Technology Entrepreneurship Development Board (NSTEDB); State Science & Technology Programme; Patent Facilitation Programme (PFP)
5	Technology Missions Division	Technology Mission Programme on Water and Clean Energy; Nano Science & Technology Mission; National Super Computing Mission; National Quantum Mission India
6	Women Scientists Programs	Gender Advancement for Transforming Institutions (GATI); Women Scientists Scheme

== Autonomous S&T Institutions ==
The autonomous science and technology institutions organized under the department include:

- Agharkar Research Institute, Pune
- Aryabhatta Research Institute of Observational Sciences, Nanital
- Birbal Sahni Institute of Palaeosciences, Lucknow
- Bose Institute, Kolkata
- Centre for Nano and Soft Matter Sciences, Bengaluru
- Indian Institute of Geomagnetism, Mumbai
- International Advanced Research Centre for Powder Metallurgy and New Materials, Hyderabad
- Institute of Nano Science and Technology, SAS Nagar
- Indian Association for the Cultivation of Science, Kolkata
- Indian Institute of Astrophysics, Bengaluru
- National Innovation Foundation
- Jawaharlal Nehru Centre for Advanced Scientific Research, Bengaluru
- Raman Research Institute, Bengaluru
- Sree Chitra Tirunal Institute for Medical Sciences and Technology
- S.N. Bose National Centre for Basic Sciences, Kolkata
- Institute of Advanced Study in Science and Technology, Guwahati
- Technology Information, Forecasting and Assessment Council (TIFAC)
- North East Centre for Technology Application and Reach, Shillong
- Wadia Institute of Himalayan Geology, Dehradun
- Vigyan Prasar, New Delhi
- Anusandhan National Research Foundation

== Scientific and industrial research organisations ==
DST runs a program to recognise non-governmental and non-commercial organisations engaged in science and technology areas as Scientific and Industrial Research Organisations (SIRO). In 2024, there were 884 organisations across natural and applied sciences, agricultural sciences, social sciences and biomedical sciences.

== Attached Institutions ==
- National Atlas & Thematic Mapping Organisation, Kolkata
- Survey of India, Dehradun
