= Kunthala Jayaraman =

Indian biotechnologist

Kunthala Jayaraman, an Indian biotechnologist, is often regarded as the 'Mother of Industrial Biotechnology Education in the world'. Jayaraman, often referred to as KJ, is credited with establishing a harmonious balance among science, engineering, and technology at Anna University, in the field of industrial biotechnology.

== Education ==
Jayaraman earned a degree in biochemistry at the Indian Institute of Science in Bangalore.

== Career ==
Jayaraman was faculty in the School of Biological Sciences (SBS) of the Madurai Kamaraj University (MKU). She along with her associate were the first discoverers of larvicidal toxin producing gene in Bacillus sphaericus in 1984, which was a major breakthrough in conquering mosquito larvae using new biopesticide. Four years later, the discovery of another toxic protein producing gene by her team became a milestone in developing Biocide-S, an environmentally safe biotechnological toxin efficient in killing mosquito larvae, at Centre for Biotechnology (CBT) in Anna University. While at MKU, she was the instrumental to conduct the WHO Conference and International Training Programme. In MKU, she was mentored and inspired by S. Ramachandran, along with Kuppamuthu Dharmalingam, to write text books in biotechnology. In 2022, in the honour of Kunthala Jayaraman, The Academy of Sciences of Chennai conducted Kunthala Jayaraman Distinguished Lecture on “Disruptive reform in higher education and translational research” and it was delivered by P. Kaliraj, Professor of Eminence, Anna University and Former Vice-Chancellor, Bharathiar University, Coimbatore.
