= Yamuna Krishnan =

Scientist and professor of Indian origin (born 1974)

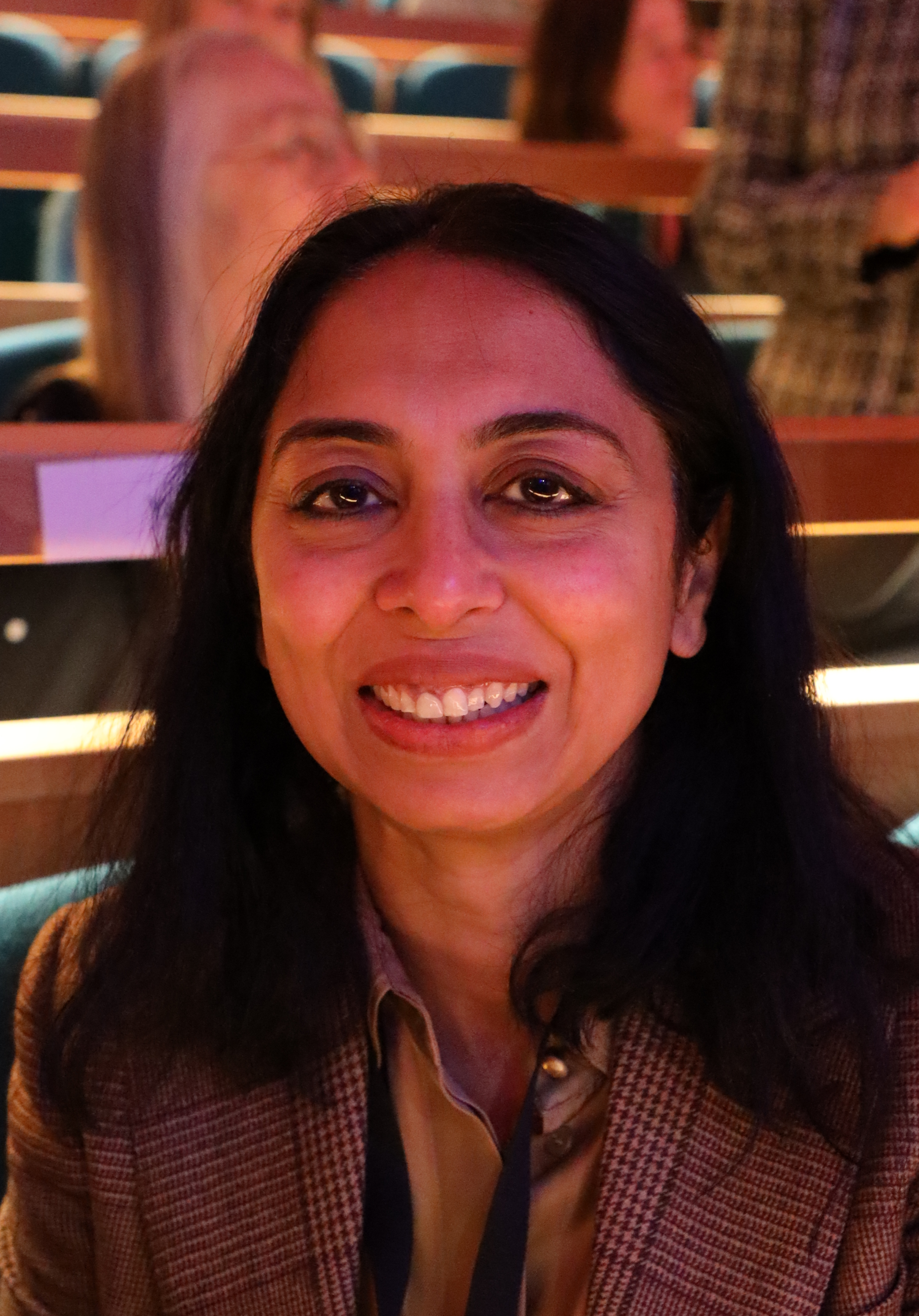
- Krishnan at the 2024 Nobel Prize lectures
- Born: May 25, 1974 (Age 51)
- Citizenship: India, United States
- Education: University of Madras, B.Sc., 1993; Indian Institute of Science, M.S., 1997, Ph.D., 2002
- Awards: Shanti Swarup Bhatnagar Prize NIH Director's Pioneer Award Infosys Prize
- Scientific career
- Fields: Organic chemistry, Synthetic Biology, Nanotechnology
- Institutions: Indian Institute of Science; University of Cambridge; National Centre for Biological Sciences; University of Chicago

Yamuna Krishnan (born May 25, 1974) is a professor at the Department of Chemistry, University of Chicago, where she has worked since August 2014. She was earlier a Reader in National Centre for Biological Sciences, Tata Institute of Fundamental Research, Bangalore, India. Krishnan won the Shanti Swarup Bhatnagar Prize for science and technology, the highest science award in India in the year 2013 in the Chemical Science category. In 2024, she was named the Louis Block Professor of Chemistry and the college.

== Early life and education ==
Krishnan was born to P.T. Krishnan and Mini in Parappanangadi, in the Malappuram district of Kerala, India. She grew up in Chennai, India. As a child, she met S. Krishnaswamy, Vice Chancellor of Madurai Kamaraj University, who fostered her interest in science. From a young age, she conducted her own informal home expiriments.

Krishnan earned her Bachelor's in Chemistry from the University of Madras, Women's Christian College, Chennai, India in 1993. She secured a Master's of Science in Chemical Sciences in 1997 and a PhD in Organic Chemistry in 2002, both from the Indian Institute of Science, Bangalore. Krishnan worked as a postdoctoral research fellow and an 1851 Research Fellow from 2001 to 2004 at the Department of Chemistry at the University of Cambridge, UK.

== Professional experience ==
Krishnan was a Fellow 'E' at National Centre for Biological Sciences from 2005 to 2009, at the TIFR in Bangalore, India, and then tenured Reader 'F' from 2009 to 2013 at the National Centre for Biological Sciences, TIFR, Bangalore, India. In 2013, she was promoted to Associate Professor 'G' at the National Centre for Biological Sciences, TIFR, Bangalore, India and moved to University of Chicago as a professor of chemistry in August 2014.

== Research ==
Krishnan's current research interests are in the areas related to structure and dynamics of nucleic acids, nucleic acid nanotechnology, cellular and subcellular technologies. Her lab tries to understand the functions from DNA beyond that of its traditional role as genetic material. They develop versatile, chemical imaging technology using self-assembled DNA nanostructures to quantitatively image second messengers in real time, in living cells and genetic model organisms.

== Awards and recognition ==
- 1851 Research Fellowship, Royal Commission for the Exhibition of 1851, 2002
- RNA Society Fellowship, 2012
- Fellow of Wolfson College, University of Cambridge, UK, 2003–2005
- Innovative Young Biotechnologist Award, DBT
- Indian National Science Academy's Young Scientist Medal
- Associate, Indian Academy of Sciences
- Editorial Advisory Board, ChemBiochem, Wiley VCH, 2010
- BK Bachhawat Award, 2010
- YIM-Boston Young Scientist Award, 2012
- Wellcome-Trust-DBT Alliance Senior Research Fellowship, 2010
- Shanti Swarup Bhatnagar Award, Chemical Sciences, 2013
- AVRA Young Scientist Award, 2014
- Cell's 40 Under 40, 2014
- Member of Faculty, 1000 Prime, Chemical Biology, 2014
- Chemical Sciences Emerging Investigator Award, Royal Society of Chemistry, 2015
- Infosys Prize 2017, Physical Sciences
- NIH Director's Pioneer Award, 2022
- Louis Block Professor of Chemistry and the college, University Of Chicago, 2024
