= Ram Rajasekharan =

Indian plant biologist and food technologist

- Born: 25 December 1960 (age 65); Manamadurai taluk, Sivaganga district, Tamil Nadu, India
- Education: Madurai Kamaraj University; Indian Institute of Science; University of Illinois at Urbana–Champaign
- Known for: Studies on plant and yeast lipid metabolism
- Awards: 2001 N-BIOS Prize; 2004 C. V. Raman State Award; 2008 MU Pro Vice-chancellor's Award; 2009 MU Pro Vice-chancellor's Award; 2011 SBC I. S. Bhatia Memorial Award; 2012 CSIR Technology Award; Nagarjuna Group Agricultural Biotechnology Excellence Award
- Scientific career
- Fields: Plant biology; Food technology
- Workplaces: DuPont; New Mexico State University; Indian Institute of Science; Monash University; Central Institute of Medicinal and Aromatic Plants; Central Food Technological Research Institute

Ram Rajasekharan (born 25 December 1960) is an Indian plant biologist, food technologist and a former director of the Central Food Technological Research Institute (CFTRI), a constituent laboratory of the Council of Scientific and Industrial Research. Known for his studies on plant lipid metabolism, Rajasekharan is a former professor of eminence at the Indian Institute of Science and an elected fellow of all the three major Indian science academies namely Indian Academy of Sciences, National Academy of Sciences, India and Indian National Science Academy as well as the National Academy of Agricultural Sciences. The Department of Biotechnology of the Government of India awarded him the National Bioscience Award for Career Development, one of the highest Indian science awards, for his contributions to biosciences in 2001.

== Biography ==
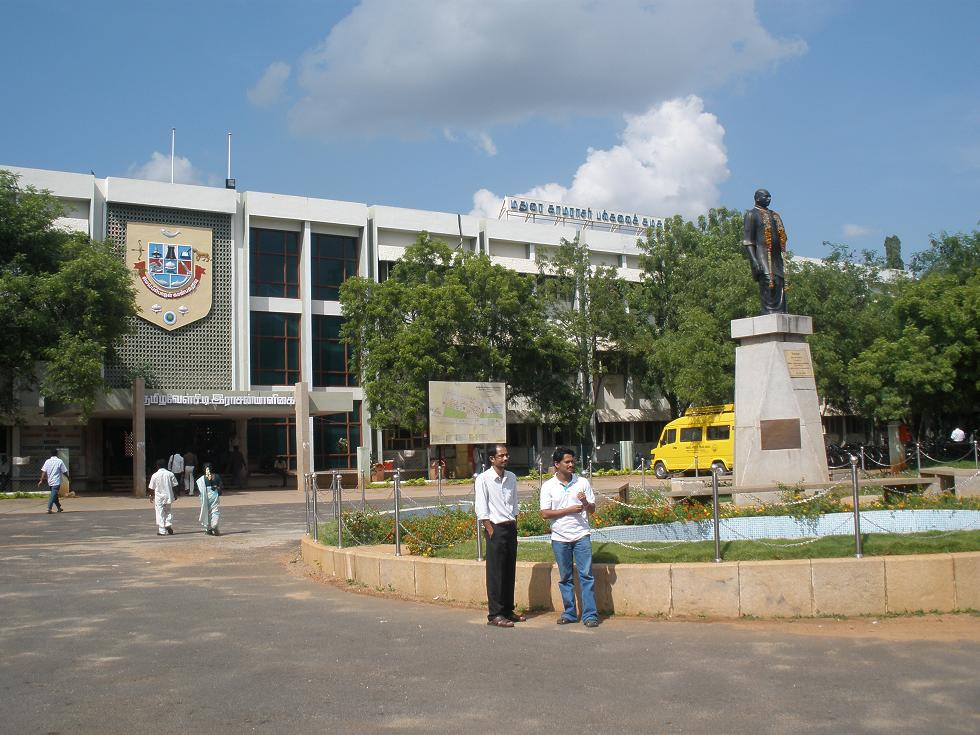
Madhurai Kamaraj University

Ram Rajasekharan was born on Christmas Day, 1960 at Manamadurai taluk, Sivaganga district of the south Indian state of Tamil Nadu. He was the first graduate from his village when he earned a BSc in zoology and botany from Madurai Kamaraj University after which he continued at the university to complete an MSc in integrated biology. His doctoral studies were at the Indian Institute of Science from where he secured a PhD in 1987 in biochemistry and moved to the US to do his post-doctoral work at the University of Illinois at Urbana–Champaign in 1987 after which he worked with DuPont at their biotechnology division as a junior investigator from 1989 to 1991. Subsequently, he had a stint at Monsanto, St. Louis and at the New Mexico State University before returning to India in 1995 to take up the position of an assistant professor at the department of biochemistry of the Indian Institute of Science. He worked at IISc till 2009 during which period he served as an associate professor (2001–07) and was serving as a professor when he was offered the directorship of the Central Institute of Medicinal and Aromatic Plants, a position he held for three years. In 2012, he returned to South India as the director of the Central Food Technological Research Institute (CFTRI) and worked till he was replaced by Jitendra J. Jadhav in 2017. He also served as a visiting professor at the School of Science of Monash University from 2007 to 2010.

== Legacy ==
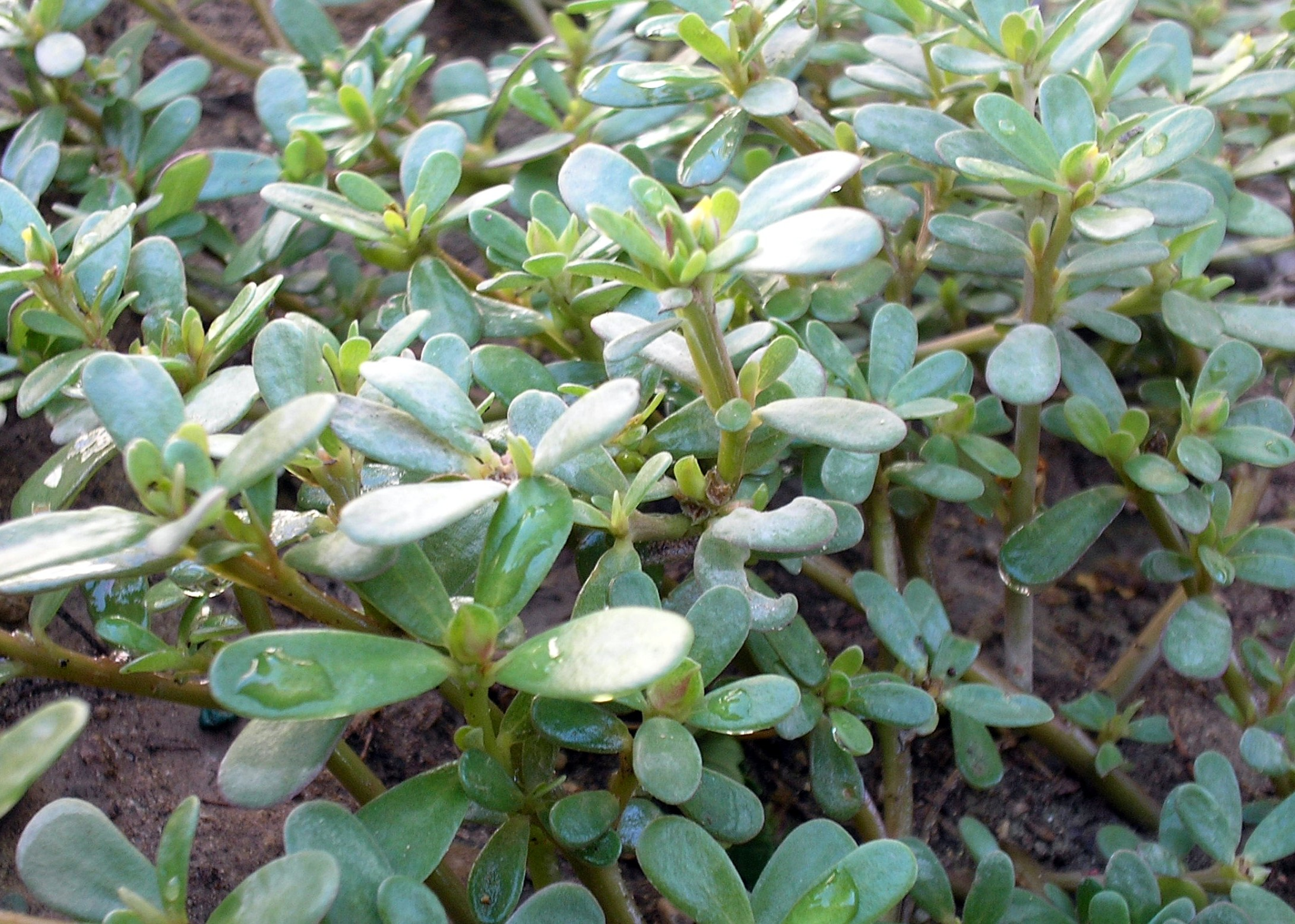
Portulaca oleracea

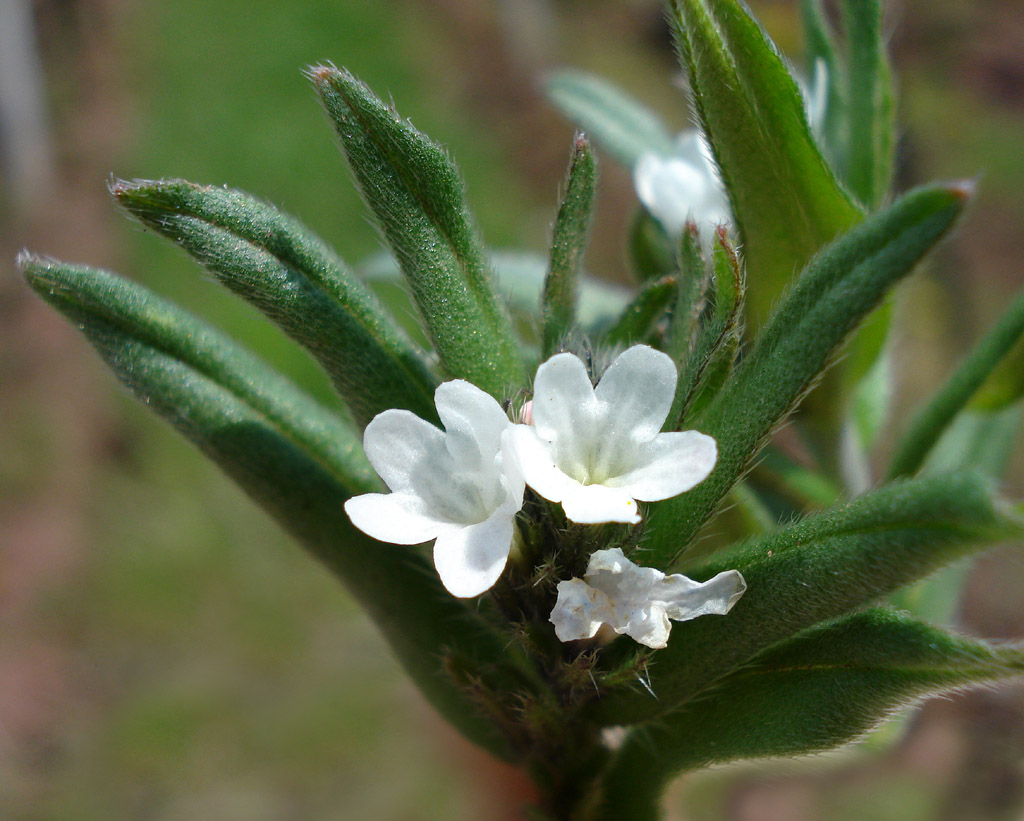
Buglossoides arvensis

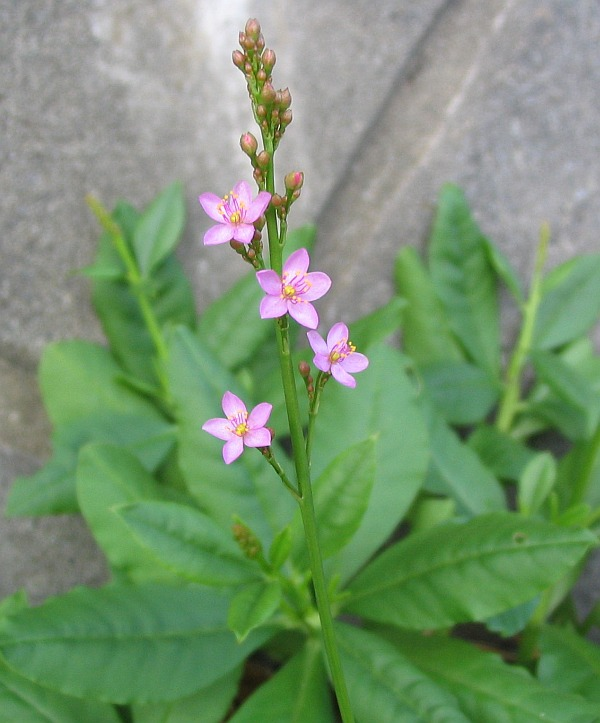
Talinum fruticosum

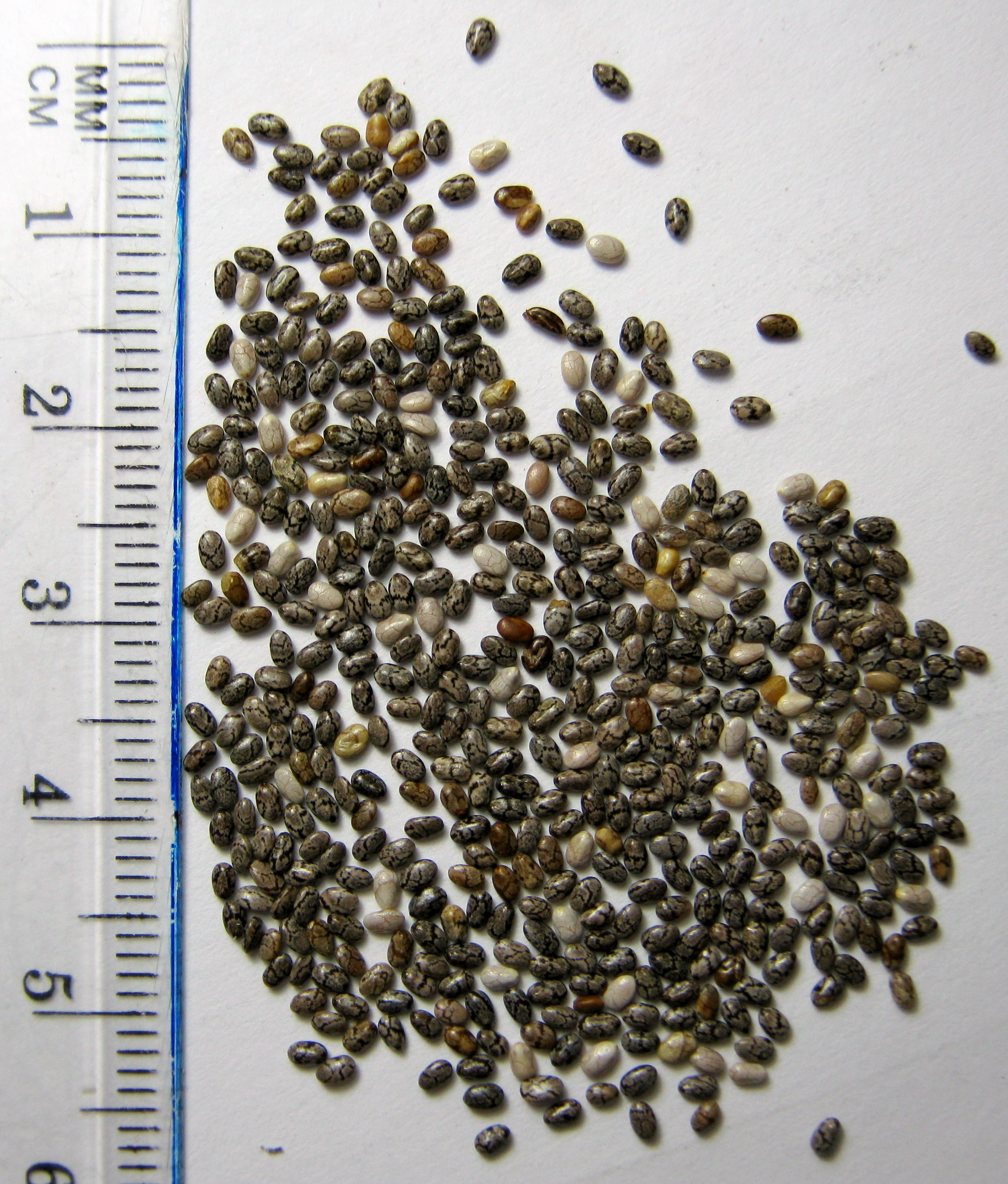
Salvia hispanica

Rajasekharan's research centers around plant lipid metabolism with special focus on the molecular biology and biochemistry of plant oils. He investigated the possibilities of using plant oils and fats as nutraceuticals and diet supplements and worked towards the improvement of crops which had such potential. At the Central Institute of Medicinal and Aromatic Plants, he led a project titled "Fork to Farm" that concentrated on two themes, development of fatty acid-derived biofuel and the production of hydrogen using algae. He had also started a unique "Waste to wealth" program of making agarbathis from spent flowers from the temples to help the women self help groups in Uttar Pradesh. At CFTRI, he worked on metabolic engineering to produce DAG-anti-obesity oil He also introduced crop cultivation of non-native plants such as Salvia hispanica (chia), Chenopodium quinoa (quinoa), Eragrostis tef (teff), Portulaca oleracea (common purslane), Talinum fruticosum (Philippine spinach) and Buglossoides arvensis (corn gromwell) in India as a part of the program. It was under his leadership, CFTRI helped in the formation of a farmers' Co-operative society "Raita Mitra" to help farmers sell their produce at reasonable price. CFTRI also entered into a cooperation with Grassroots Research and Advocacy Movement (GRAAM), a non governmental organization, for supporting tribal women entrepreneurs through transfer of modern technology.

Rajasekharan holds 11 patents for the processes he has developed of which nine has been licensed to companies including Dow Chemicals, Nagarjuna Group. He has also collaborated with noted biochemists such as P. N. Rangarajan and Govindarajan Padmanaban. His studies have been documented by way of a number of articles (Note: Please see Selected bibliography section) and the online repository of scientific articles of the Indian Academy of Sciences has listed 24 of them. He has also delivered several invited speeches at various conferences and served as a member of the advisory committee of many conferences and has organized 2 major annual events of the Society of Biological Chemists (India) at Lucknow and Mysore.

== Awards and honors ==
The Department of Biotechnology of the Government of India awarded Rajasekharan the National Bioscience Award for Career Development, one of the highest Indian science awards in 2001. He received the Sir C. V. Raman State Award in Life Sciences of the Karnataka State Council for Science and Technology in 2004 and the Pro Vice-chancellor's Award for excellence in research of Monash University for two consecutive years in 2008 and 2009. He is also a recipient of the Nagarjuna Group Agricultural Biotechnology Excellence Award, 2011 I. S. Bhatia Memorial Award of the Society of Biological Chemists and the 2012 CSIR Technology Award for Life Sciences, of the Council of Scientific and Industrial Research.

Rajasekharan was elected as a member of Guha Research Conference in 2002. The National Academy of Agricultural Sciences elected him as a fellow in 2003 followed by National Academy of Sciences, India in 2005. Subsequently, the Indian Academy of Sciences and the Indian National Science Academy also made him their fellow in 2006 and 2012 respectively. The Department of Science and Technology of the Government of India selected him for J. C. Bose National Fellowship in 2013.

== Job transfer controversy ==
Ram Rajasekharan was in the news in 2014 when people allegedly belonging to Karnataka Rakshana Vedike, a pro-Kannada non governmental organization, manhandled him, alleging bias against Kannadigas. Subsequently, he ordered closure of the office of Kannada Sahrudaya Balaga, a pro-Kannada organization which was functioning inside CFTRI premises. He also suspended two of its members. Later, the Council of Scientific and Industrial Research transferred Rajasekharan to New Delhi as the Director of Special Projects and Initiatives, which was contested by him before the tribunal. The tribunal ruled in favor of Rajasekharan.

== Selected bibliography ==
(Last 5 years)

- Yadav, Pradeep Kumar; Rajvanshi, Praveen Kumar; Rajasekharan, Ram (2017). "The role of yeast m6A methyltransferase in peroxisomal fatty acid oxidation". Current Genetics. 64 (2): 417–422. doi:10.1007/s00294-017-0769-5. PMID 29043484. S2CID 3878390.
- Yadav, Pradeep Kumar; Rajasekharan, Ram (2017). "The m6A methyltransferase Ime4 and mitochondrial functions in yeast". Current Genetics. 64 (2): 353–357. doi:10.1007/s00294-017-0758-8. PMID 28975387. S2CID 3837543.
- Rajvanshi, Praveen Kumar; Arya, Madhuri; Rajasekharan, Ram (2017). "The stress-regulatory transcription factors Msn2 and Msn4 regulate fatty acid oxidation in budding yeast". Journal of Biological Chemistry. 292 (45): 18628–18643. doi:10.1074/jbc.M117.801704. PMC 5682970. PMID 28924051.
- Sreedhar, R. V; Prasad, P; Reddy, L. Prasanna Anjaneya; Rajasekharan, Ram; Srinivasan, Malathi (2017). "Unravelling a stearidonic acid-rich triacylglycerol biosynthetic pathway in the developing seeds of Buglossoides arvensis: A transcriptomic landscape". Scientific Reports. 7 (1): 10473. Bibcode:2017NatSR...710473S. doi:10.1038/s41598-017-09882-y. PMC 5585386. PMID 28874672.
- Yadav, Pradeep Kumar; Rajasekharan, Ram (2017). "The m6A methyltransferase Ime4 epitranscriptionally regulates triacylglycerol metabolism and vacuolar morphology in haploid yeast cells". Journal of Biological Chemistry. 292 (33): 13727–13744. doi:10.1074/jbc.M117.783761. PMC 5566527. PMID 28655762.
- Singh, Neelima; Yadav, Kamlesh Kumar; Rajasekharan, Ram (2017). "Effect of zinc deprivation on the lipid metabolism of budding yeast". Current Genetics. 63 (6): 977–982. doi:10.1007/s00294-017-0704-9. PMID 28500379. S2CID 35829662.
- Arya, Madhuri; Srinivasan, Malathi; Rajasekharan, Ram (2017). "Human alpha beta hydrolase domain containing protein 11 and its yeast homolog are lipid hydrolases". Biochemical and Biophysical Research Communications. 487 (4): 875–80. doi:10.1016/j.bbrc.2017.04.145. PMID 28465236.
- Yadav, Pradeep Kumar; Rajasekharan, Ram (2017). "Cardiolipin deficiency causes triacylglycerol accumulation in Saccharomyces cerevisiae". Molecular and Cellular Biochemistry. 434 (1–2): 89–103. doi:10.1007/s11010-017-3039-4. PMID 28432553. S2CID 11006351.
- Yadav, Kamlesh Kumar; Singh, Neelima; Rajvanshi, Praveen Kumar; Rajasekharan, Ram (2016). "The RNA polymerase I subunit Rpa12p interacts with the stress-responsive transcription factor Msn4p to regulate lipid metabolism in budding yeast". FEBS Letters. 590 (20): 3559–3573. doi:10.1002/1873-3468.12422. PMID 27637775. S2CID 32573058.
- Ramya, Visvanathan; Rajasekharan, Ram (2016). "ATG15 encodes a phospholipase and is transcriptionally regulated by YAP1 in Saccharomyces cerevisiae". FEBS Letters. 590 (18): 3155–67. doi:10.1002/1873-3468.12369. PMID 27543826. S2CID 32530127.
- Yadav, Pradeep Kumar; Rajasekharan, Ram (2016). "Misregulation of a DDHD Domain-containing Lipase Causes Mitochondrial Dysfunction in Yeast". Journal of Biological Chemistry. 291 (35): 18562–81. doi:10.1074/jbc.M116.733378. PMC 5000100. PMID 27402848.
- Yadav, Kamlesh Kumar; Rajasekharan, Ram (2016). "Microarray data analyses of yeast RNA Pol I subunit RPA12 deletion strain". Genomics Data. 8: 104–5. doi:10.1016/j.gdata.2016.04.011. PMC 4872367. PMID 27222810.
- Yadav, Kamlesh Kumar; Rajasekharan, Ram (2016). "The transcription factor GCN4 regulates PHM8 and alters triacylglycerol metabolism in Saccharomyces cerevisiae". Current Genetics. 62 (4): 841–851. doi:10.1007/s00294-016-0590-6. PMID 26979516. S2CID 5743517.
- Singh, Neelima; Yadav, Kamlesh Kumar; Rajasekharan, Ram (2016). "ZAP1-mediated modulation of triacylglycerol levels in yeast by transcriptional control of mitochondrial fatty acid biosynthesis". Molecular Microbiology. 100 (1): 55–75. doi:10.1111/mmi.13298. PMID 26711224.
- Kanagavijayan, Dhanabalan; Rajasekharan, Ram; Srinivasan, Malathi (2016). "YeastMRXdeletions have short chronological life span and more triacylglycerols". FEMS Yeast Research. 16 (1) fov109. doi:10.1093/femsyr/fov109. PMID 26678749.
- Yadav, Kamlesh Kumar; Singh, Neelima; Rajasekharan, Ram (2015). "Responses to phosphate deprivation in yeast cells". Current Genetics. 62 (2): 301–7. doi:10.1007/s00294-015-0544-4. PMID 26615590. S2CID 8340962.
- Vijayakumar, Anitha; Vijayaraj, Panneerselvam; Vijayakumar, Arun Kumar; Rajasekharan, Ram (2016). "The Arabidopsis ABHD11 Mutant Accumulates Polar Lipids in Leaves as a Consequence of Absent Acylhydrolase Activity". Plant Physiology. 170 (1): 180–93. doi:10.1104/pp.15.01615. PMC 4704602. PMID 26589672.
- Yadav, Kamlesh Kumar; Singh, Neelima; Rajasekharan, Ram (2015). "PHO4 transcription factor regulates triacylglycerol metabolism under low-phosphate conditions in Saccharomyces cerevisiae". Molecular Microbiology. 98 (3): 456–72. doi:10.1111/mmi.13133. PMID 26179227.
- r. v, Sreedhar; Kumari, Priya; Rupwate, Sunny D; Rajasekharan, Ram; Srinivasan, Malathi (2015). "Exploring Triacylglycerol Biosynthetic Pathway in Developing Seeds of Chia (Salvia hispanica L.): A Transcriptomic Approach". PLOS ONE. 10 (4) e0123580. Bibcode:2015PLoSO..1023580R. doi:10.1371/journal.pone.0123580. PMC 4395390. PMID 25875809.
- Rani, S. H; Saha, S; Rajasekharan, R (2012). "A soluble diacylglycerol acyltransferase is involved in triacylglycerol biosynthesis in the oleaginous yeast Rhodotorula glutinis". Microbiology. 159 (Pt 1): 155–66. doi:10.1099/mic.0.063156-0. PMID 23103975.
- Vijayaraj, P; Jashal, C. B; Vijayakumar, A; Rani, S. H; Venkata Rao, D. K; Rajasekharan, R (2012). "A Bifunctional Enzyme That Has Both Monoacylglycerol Acyltransferase and Acyl Hydrolase Activities". Plant Physiology. 160 (2): 667–83. doi:10.1104/pp.112.202135. PMC 3461547. PMID 22915575.
- Rupwate, Sunny D; Rajasekharan, Ram (2014). "Plant phosphoinositide-specific phospholipase C". Plant Signaling & Behavior. 7 (10): 1281–3. doi:10.4161/psb.21436. PMC 3493414. PMID 22902702.
- Rupwate, Sunny D; Rupwate, Preeti S; Rajasekharan, Ram (2012). "Regulation of lipid biosynthesis by phosphatidylinositol-specific phospholipase C through the transcriptional repression of upstream activating sequence inositol containing genes". FEBS Letters. 586 (10): 1555–60. Bibcode:2012FEBSL.586.1555R. doi:10.1016/j.febslet.2012.04.022. PMID 22673525.
- Parthibane, V; Iyappan, R; Vijayakumar, A; Venkateshwari, V; Rajasekharan, R (2012). "Serine/Threonine/Tyrosine Protein Kinase Phosphorylates Oleosin, a Regulator of Lipid Metabolic Functions". Plant Physiology. 159 (1): 95–104. doi:10.1104/pp.112.197194. PMC 3375988. PMID 22434039.
- Parthibane, Velayoudame; Rajakumari, Sona; Venkateshwari, Varadarajan; Iyappan, Ramachandiran; Rajasekharan, Ram (2012). "Oleosin is Bifunctional Enzyme That Has Both Monoacylglycerol Acyltransferase and Phospholipase Activities". Journal of Biological Chemistry. 287 (3): 1946–54. doi:10.1074/jbc.M111.309955. PMC 3265875. PMID 22128159.
- Rupwate, Sunny D; Rajasekharan, Ram (2011). "C2 domain is responsible for targeting rice phosphoinositide specific phospholipase C". Plant Molecular Biology. 78 (3): 247–58. doi:10.1007/s11103-011-9862-1. PMID 22124893. S2CID 14950341.

== See also ==
- Food technology
- Dietary supplement
