= Kumaravel Somasundaram =

Indian cancer biologist( Born: 1962)

- Born: 8 October 1962 (age 64); Tamil Nadu, India
- Education: Madras Veterinary College; University of Madras; Madurai Kamaraj University; Northwestern University Medical School; Howard Hughes Medical Institute; University of Pennsylvania School of Medicine
- Known for: Studies on Glioblastoma
- Awards: 2006 N-BIOS Prize
- Scientific career
- Fields: Cancer biology
- Workplaces: Indian Institute of Science
- Doctoral advisor: Kuppamuthu Dharmalingam; Bayar Thimmapaya; Wafik El-Deiry

Kumaravel Somasundaram (born 8 October 1962) is an Indian cancer biologist and a professor at the Department of Microbiology and Cell Biology of the Indian Institute of Science. Known for his studies on the therapeutics of Glioblastoma, Somasunderam is an elected fellow of all the three major Indian science academies namely, the National Academy of Sciences, India, the Indian Academy of Sciences and the Indian National Science Academy. The Department of Biotechnology of the Government of India awarded him the National Bioscience Award for Career Development, one of the highest Indian science awards, for his contributions to biosciences in 2006.

== Biography ==
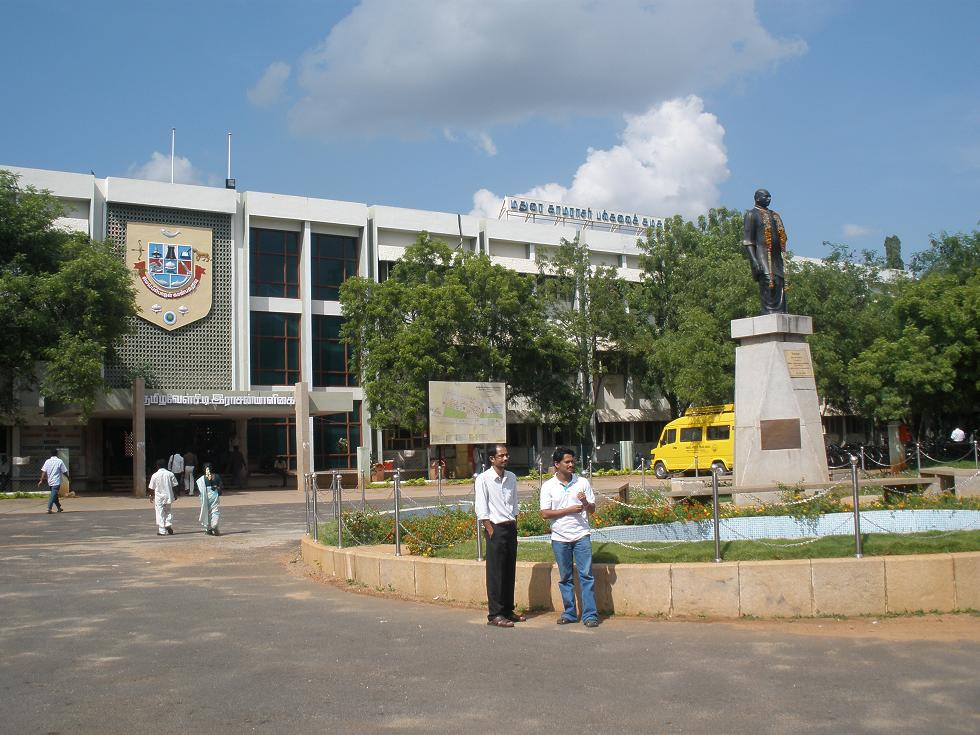
Madurai Kamaraj University-front view

Kumaravel Somasundaram, born on 8 October 1962 in the south Indian state of Tamil Nadu, graduated in veterinary medicine from the Madras Veterinary College and did his post-graduate studies at the Madurai Kamaraj University to earn an MSc in biotechnology. He continued at the university for his doctoral studies under the guidance of Kuppamuthu Dharmalingam and after securing a PhD, he moved to the US for his post-doctoral work which he did, first under Bayar Thimmapaya at the Northwestern University Medical School during 1993–95 and later, at the Howard Hughes Medical Institute of the University of Pennsylvania, working on DNA tumor viruses and tumor suppressor genes, supervised by Wafik El-Deiry from 1995 to 1999. On his return to India, he joined the Indian Institute of Science (IISc) as a member of faculty at the division of biological sciences, subsequently became an associate professor at the Department of Microbiology and Cell Biology and continues his association with IISc, serving as a professor. He also heads the research group, popularly known as Prof. Kumar Somasundaram's Lab.

Somasundaram resides in IISc housing colony in Bengaluru, Karnataka.

== Legacy ==
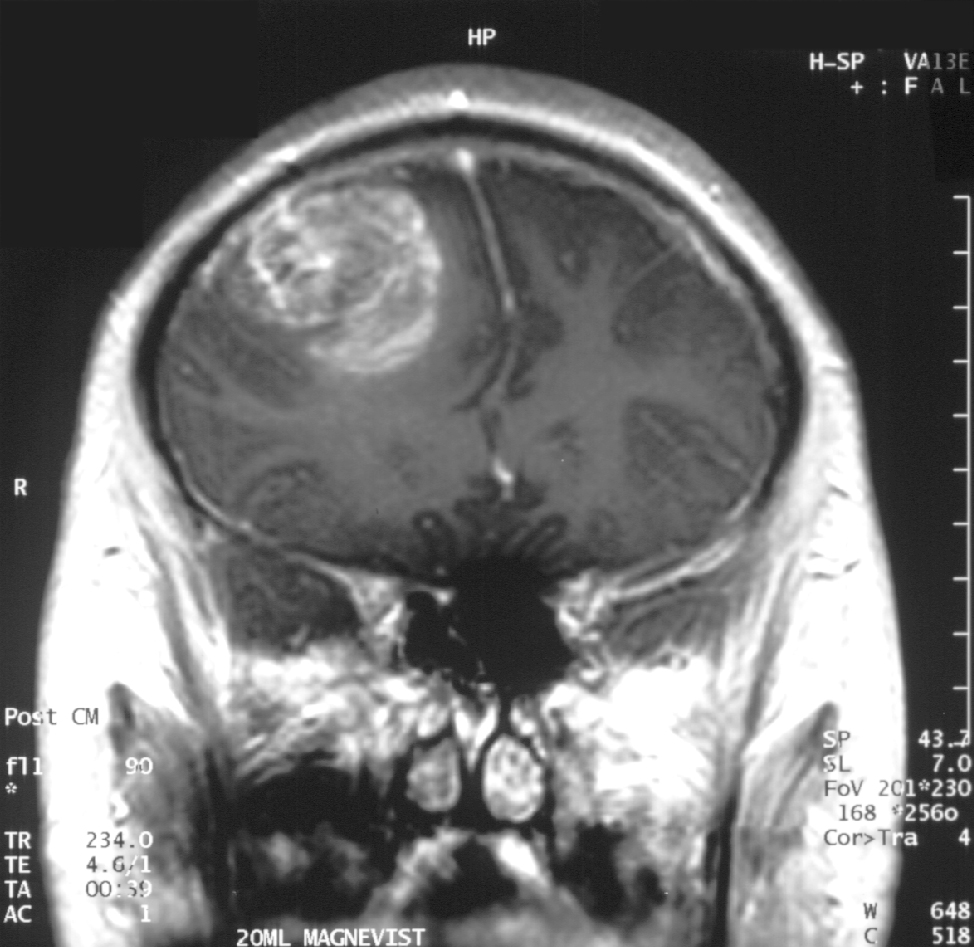
Glioblastoma - MR coronal with contrast

Somasundaram's work is centered around the studies of oncoviruses, tumor suppressor genes, gliomas and microRNAs and he has done advanced research on glioblastoma, an aggressive form of cancer affecting the brain. The group led by him is engaged in work concerning the determination of the role of cellular tumor antigen p53 in glioma, regulating the protein, p73 in cervical cancer patients, using Adenovirus early region 1A, a tumor suppressor gene, the analytical study of BRCA1 gene in breast cancer and the analysis and regulation of SV2A, a synaptic vesicle protein. He demonstrated that glioblastoma spreads rapidly by producing macrophage colony-stimulating factor (MCSF) in large quantities which in turn stimulate the growth of blood vessels in the tumor. He proposed that the MCSF interacted with the anti-tumor microglial cells of the human body and induced them to produce Insulin-like growth factor-binding protein 1 (IGFBP1), thereby impairing the capacity of microglial cells to fight the tumor cells, a process he called befriending. The discovery of this new molecule, IGFBP1 and its role in glioma angiogenesis, led to a collaborative investigation which involved four research institutions namely National Institute of Mental Health and Neuro Sciences, Sri Sathya Sai Institute of Higher Medical Sciences and Institute for Functional Genomics (INSERM) of the University of Montpellier, apart from the IISc. The research team led by Somasundaram and Phillipe Marin of INSERM validated the earlier findings and proposed a new therapeutic protocol for glioblastoma which targeted IGFBP1, rather than Vascular endothelial growth factor (VEGF) which earlier treatment methods attacked. The researchers, later, released their findings through a paper, Glioblastoma-derived Macrophage Colony Stimulating Factor (MCSF) Induces Microglial Release of Insulin-like Growth Factor-Binding Protein 1 (IGFBP1) to Promote Angiogenesis, published in the Journal of Biological Chemistry. Work is in progress at his laboratory for developing biomarkers (twenty genes of which is named gene X, have already been discovered) for which detailed study is being conducted on microRNA, DNA methylation, modifications of chromatin and gene fusions. His studies have been documented by way of a number of articles (Note: Please see Selected bibliography section) and ResearchGate, an online repository of scientific articles has listed 178 of them. He has also conducted workshops including the Workshop on Next Generation Sequencing organized by the Council of Scientific and Industrial Research in November 2013 and has delivered invited or plenary speeches at various conferences and seminars and the 5th annual meeting of the Proteomics Society, India held in September 2013 was one among them.

Somasundaram is credited with the establishment of the first laboratory for molecular oncology at the IISc and his contributions are also reported in the establishment of a facility for genomics at the institute. He has undertaken many research programs in cancer biology which included the IISC initiative on Cancer Biology and Therapeutics. He serves as the principal investigator of the Genomics Programme of the IISc in collaboration with the New Millennium Indian Technology Leadership Initiative (NMITLI) of the Council of Scientific and Industrial Research (CSIR) and is the co-convener of the DBT - IISc Partnership Program for Advanced Research in Biological Sciences and Bio Engineering. He is a member of the DBT Neurobiology Task force of the Department of Biotechnology, sits in the editorial board of the Cancer Biology and Therapy journal published by Taylor & Francis and is a former member of the senate of the Indian Institute of Science.

== Awards and honors ==
Somasundaram received the International Senior Research Fellowship of the Wellcome Trust in 2004. The Department of Biotechnology of the Government of India awarded him the National Bioscience Award for Career Development, one of the highest Indian science awards in 2006. The Indian Academy of Sciences elected him as a fellow in 2007 and he received the elected fellowship of the National Academy of Sciences, India, the same year. The other major Indian science academy, the Indian National Science Academy elected him to fellowship in 2009.

== Selected bibliography ==
- Bhargava, Shruti; Visvanathan, Abhirami; Patil, Vikas; Kumar, Anuj; Kesari, Santosh; Das, Saumitra; Hegde, Alangar S.; Arivazhagan, Arimappamagan; Santosh, Vani; Somasundaram, Kumaravel (15 April 2017). "IGF2 mRNA binding protein 3 (IMP3) promotes glioma cell migration by enhancing the translation of RELA/p65". Oncotarget. 8 (25): 40469–40485. doi:10.18632/oncotarget.17118. ISSN 1949-2553. PMC 5522290. PMID 28465487.
- Visvanathan, Abhirami; Somasundaram, Kumaravel (January 2018). "mRNA Traffic Control Reviewed: N6-Methyladenosine (m6 A) Takes the Driver's Seat". BioEssays. 40 (1) 1700093. doi:10.1002/bies.201700093. ISSN 1521-1878. PMID 29205437. S2CID 23562371.
- Das, Sanjeev; Nama, Srikanth; Antony, Sini; Somasundaram, Kumaravel (2005). "p73β-expressing recombinant adenovirus: a potential anticancer agent". Cancer Gene Therapy. 12 (4): 417–426. doi:10.1038/sj.cgt.7700803. ISSN 1476-5500. PMID 15678153. S2CID 25325662.

== See also ==
- Oncovirus
- Insulin-like growth factor receptor
