= Gnanam =

Gnanam is a surname. Notable people with the surname include:

- A. Gnanam (1932–2017), Indian educationist
- A. Y. S. Gnanam (1922–2007), Sri Lankan businessman
- Pollachi S. Gnanam (1921? – 1962), Tamil movie actress
- Bombay Gnanam (fl. 1989), Indian actress
