= A. Gnanam =

Indian educationist (1932–2017)

A. Gnanam (5 October 1932 – 16 May 2017) was an educationist who served as the second Vice-Chancellor of Pondicherry University from 1991 to 2007.

== Career ==
Gnanam is most remembered for his credit in popularizing and initiating the community college concept with the foundation of first of the same kind in Pondicherry University. He was the educationist who first introduced the concept of Choice-Based Credit System (CBCS) in Indian universities. From 1985 to 1988, he also served as the Vice-Chancellor of Bharathidasan University followed by his tenure as Vice-Chancellor of University of Madras from 1988 to 1990.

Gnanam initiated the research unit of Plant sciences under the Department of Biology at Madurai Kamaraj University after he joined there in 1969 as a Reader.

He served as the Head of the Plant sciences unit at Madurai Kamaraj University till 1985. He also holds the credit to establish Department of Science and Technology (India) (DST) centre for Photosynthesis at Madurai Kamaraj University. Under his direction, Karuppannan Veluthambi, a molecular biologist and former Professor of School of Biotechnology of Madurai Kamaraj University, established a Department of Biotechnology (DBT) centre for Plant Molecular Biology in the university premises.
