= Peri Kabilan =

Pastoralist activist from Tamil Nadu, India

Peri Kabilan (born July 24, 1978) is a pastoralist activist from Tamil Nadu. He serves as the coordinator of the Thozhuvam organization and as an associate professor in the Department of Computer Science at Madurai Kamaraj University College, Tamil Nadu-India. In 2022, he received the Vikatan Prime Ten Youth Hope Award.

== Activities ==
Peri Kabilan conducts research and discussions in the fields of natural balance, biodiversity conservation, pastoral culture, and climate change. In 2020–21, he conducted an ethnographic study on the Varattattu Keedharis, a semi-nomadic pastoral community living in Southern Tamil Nadu, with a UNESCO research grant.

=== Thozhuvam Organization ===
He founded the Thozhuvam organization in 2020 to promote the sustainable livelihood of pastoral communities, biodiversity conservation, and ecological balance.

== Publications ==
- Keedharis Ethnography (கீதாரிகள் இனவரைவியல்), Sandhya Pathippagam (சந்தியா பதிப்பகம்), 2021
- Tamil Nadu Pastoralism (தமிழ்நாடு பாஸ்டோரலிசம்), Yaam Pathippagam (யாம் பதிப்பகம்), 2024 (Editor)

== Awards and Recognition ==
- 2022 Top Ten Youth Award (டாப் டென் இளைஞர்கள் விருது), Ananda Vikatan, Chennai (February 21, 2023)
- 2022, Valarthamizh Mamani Award (வளர்தமிழ் மாமணி விருது), World Tamil Language Development and Research Conference, Chennai (August 12, 2022)
- 2024, Vocational Excellence Award, Rotary Club of Chennai
