= Sathees Chukkurumbal Raghavan =

Indian biologist

Sathees C. Raghavan is a Professor in the Department of Biochemistry at the Indian Institute of Science, Bangalore, India. He is from Kannur, Kerala. He was awarded the Shanti Swarup Bhatnagar Prize for science and technology, the highest science award in India, for the year 2013 in the biological science category. He was awarded the prize for his research work on novel DNA repair inhibitors that can target cancer cells. He received his BSc in Zoology from Payyannur College, Payyannur, MSc in Zoology with Entomology Specialization from University Center, Calicut University, Calicut, and PhD in Zoology from Banaras Hindu University, Varanasi India in 2000. He completed postdoctoral research at the University of Southern California Los Angeles from 1999 to 2006. His main research interests are cancer genetics, genomic instability, DNA repair, and recombination. Raghavan played the important role of convener of the lecture workshop on Recent Advances in Biotechnology of Health and Disease (BHD-2011) organized by Madurai Kamaraj University in 2011.
