= R. M. Pitchappan =

Indian biologist

R. M. Pitchappan or Ramasamy Pitchappan, Ph.D., F.A.Sc., F.A.M.S. (born 1946), is an Indian biologist known for his studies on immunogenetics and infectious diseases. He was a professor in the School of Biological Sciences (SBS) of the Madurai Kamaraj University (MKU). In addition, Pitchappan held the positions of director, Educational Medical Research Centre, director-research, Chettinad University, Chennai, and adjunct professor, ICMR Andaman Nicobar Islands. He also held the position of the vice-president of the Nilgiri Adivasi Welfare Association in Kotagiri, Nilgiris, and as an advisor to the ancient DNA programme of Government of Tamil Nadu.

== Contribution in science ==
Pitchappan has used an integrative approach and new DNA technologies to explore infectious illnesses and human population genetics. His discoveries include the genomic predisposition for leprosy, tuberculosis susceptibility, and the first out of Africa emigration of modern man through India. His publications explained the pre-Aryan origins of the Brokpa, a Dardic-speaking tribe from Dah-Hanu, Leh, and Ladak as well as the beginnings of the caste system in India. As several male-mediated migrations from various places came together in one location, they merged into caste-like clans. To his credit, he has delivered keynote addresses and symposium speeches at UNESCO, numerous international congresses on HLA and immunology, as well as World Tamil Conferences. He has also published more than 100 research articles in peer-reviewed journals.

== Awards and recognition ==
Pitchappan's awards and recognition include:

- 1980: Visiting Scientist to the laboratory of Director Prof. Jean Dausset, Nobel Laureate
- 1985: Outstanding Young person award
- 1995: Jaycees of Tamil Nadu and Lancet's Investigator Award
- 2002: IIH-ICMR, Mumbai, Elected Fellow of Indian Academy of Sciences, Bangalore, India
- 2002: Elected Fellow of National Academy of Medical Sciences, New Delhi, India
- 2003: Member, International Advisory Committee, 7th Asia-Oceania Histocompatibility workshop, Karuizawa, Japan
- 2003: International Collaborative Research Grants: Commission of European Communities, The Wellcome Trust Centre, London, UK; INSERM (France)-ICMR Grant on TB, H.M.Bhatia Memoraial Oration Award - ICMR-IIH, Mumbai, Life Time Achievement Award - Association of Microbiologists of India - Tamil Nadu.
