= Shabaana Khader =

American microbiologist

Shabaana A. Khader
- Education: Bharathidasan University; Madurai Kamaraj University; University of Madras
- Scientific career
- Workplaces: Trudeau Institute; University of Pittsburgh; Washington University in St. Louis; University of Chicago

Shabaana A. Khader is an Indian-American microbiologist who is the Bernard and Betty Roizman Professor of Microbiology at the University of Chicago. She is also the Chair of the Department of Microbiology. In an effort to design new vaccines and therapeutic strategies, Khader studies host-pathogen interactions in infectious disease.

== Early life and education ==
Khader grew up in India. She attended Bharathidasan University, where she earned an undergraduate degree in zoology in 1995. She completed an undergraduate degree in biomedical genetics at the University of Madras. She was a doctoral researcher in biotechnology at the Madurai Kamaraj University. Her research considered host-pathogen interactions during leprosy, a disease caused by mycobacteria. After earning her doctorate in 2004, she was a postdoc at the Trudeau Institute under the mentorship of Dr. Andrea Cooper, working on host-immune responses in tuberculosis. At Trudeau, Khader demonstrated that the cytokine Interleukin-17 played a critical role in vaccine-induced immunity to the infectious disease tuberculosis. She studied and described the role Interleukin 12 (IL-12) cytokines play in tuberculosis infection.

== Research and career ==
Khader joined the University of Pittsburgh in 2007 and studied Mycobacterium tuberculosis and Francisella tularensis as well as the role of cytokines in immunity. Khader moved her research team to Washington University School of Medicine in 2013. In 2022, Khader moved to the University of Chicago, and was appointed chair of the Department of Microbiology.

Khader's research considers the complex host-pathogen interactions that take place in infectious disease. In these interactions, the bacterium can escape the granuloma, spreading as a pathogenic organism throughout a host. She looks to inform the design of new diagnostic tests and novel vaccines.

== Awards and honors ==
- 2021 Elected Fellow of American Society for Microbiology
- 2021 Executive Leadership in Academic Medicine Program

== Selected publications ==
- Shabaana A Khader; Guy K Bell; John Pearl; et al. (2007). "IL-23 and IL-17 in the establishment of protective pulmonary CD4+ T cell responses after vaccination and during Mycobacterium tuberculosis challenge". Nature Immunology. 8 (4): 369–377. doi:10.1038/ni1449. PMID 17351619. Wikidata Q58518610.
- Vicky Lampropoulou; Alexey Sergushichev; Monika Bambouskova; et al. (2016). "Itaconate Links Inhibition of Succinate Dehydrogenase with Macrophage Metabolic Remodeling and Regulation of Inflammation". Cell Metabolism. 24 (1): 158–166. doi:10.1016/j.cmet.2016.06.004. PMC 5108454. PMID 27374498. Wikidata Q37412828.
- S A Khader; S L Gaffen; J K Kolls (2009). "Th17 cells at the crossroads of innate and adaptive immunity against infectious diseases at the mucosa". Mucosal Immunology. 2 (5): 403–411. doi:10.1038/mi.2009.100. PMC 2811522. PMID 19587639. Wikidata Q33611067.
