= Ramamirtha Jayaraman =

Indian geneticist (1937–2019)

- Born: 10 October 1937; Tamil Nadu, India
- Died: 14 April 2019 (aged 81); Madurai, Tamil Nadu, India
- Known for: Genetics of Escherichia coli
- Awards: 1982 Shanti Swarup Bhatnagar Prize
- Scientific career
- Fields: Microbial genetics
- Institutions: Madurai Kamaraj University (as Professor) Tata Institute of Fundamental Research (as Scientist)

Ramamirtha Jayaraman (10 October 1937 – 14 April 2019) was an Indian geneticist, known for his studies on bacteria, especially on Escherichia coli. His researches on the control of transcription of bacteria are known to have evidenced the participation of accessory factors in transcription and their interactions with RNA polymerase. He was a professor at the Madurai Kamaraj University (MKU) and a former scientist at Tata Institute of Fundamental Research. Post his retirement, he served as an emeritus scientist at MKU. He authored the reference manual, Jayaraman Laboratory Manual in Molecular Genetics and several pamphlets and articles; PubMed, an online repository of medical papers has listed 59 of them. The Council of Scientific and Industrial Research, the apex agency of the Government of India for scientific research, awarded him the Shanti Swarup Bhatnagar Prize for Science and Technology, one of the highest Indian science awards, in 1982, for his contributions to biological sciences.

He died on 13 April 2019.

== See also ==
- T4 rII system
