= Mushi Santappa =

Indian polymer chemist and leather technologist

- Born: 2 October 1923; Jonnagiri, Andhra Pradesh, India
- Died: 26 February 2017 (aged 93)
- Education: University of Madras; Banaras Hindu University; University of London; Manchester University
- Known for: Studies on kinetics of oxidation, Complexometry, Synthetic high polymers, Leather technology
- Awards: 1967 Shanti Swarup Bhatnagar Prize; 1982 ICS Sir J. C. Ghosh Memorial Medal; 1985 FICCI Award for Science and Technology; Sevaratna Award; Voice Award for Science and Technology
- Scientific career
- Fields: Photochemistry; Polymer chemistry
- Workplaces: University of Madras; Madurai Kamaraj University; Central Leather Research Institute; Sri Venkateswara University
- Doctoral advisor: R. W. West; Meredith Gwynne Evans

Mushi Santappa FRS FRIC (2 October 1923 – 26 February 2017) was an Indian polymer chemist, leather technologist and a vice chancellor of Sri Venkateswara University and the University of Madras. He was one of the founder directors of Avanti Leathers Limited and was known for his researches on the synthesis of graft copolymers, the properties of macromolecules, and osmotic techniques. He was an elected Fellow of the Indian Academy of Sciences, National Academy of Sciences, India, Royal Institute of Chemistry and New York Academy of Sciences and a founder fellow of the Academy of Sciences, Chennai. The Council of Scientific and Industrial Research, the apex agency of the Government of India for scientific research, awarded him the Shanti Swarup Bhatnagar Prize for Science and Technology, one of the highest Indian science awards, in 1967, for his contributions to chemical sciences.

== Biography ==
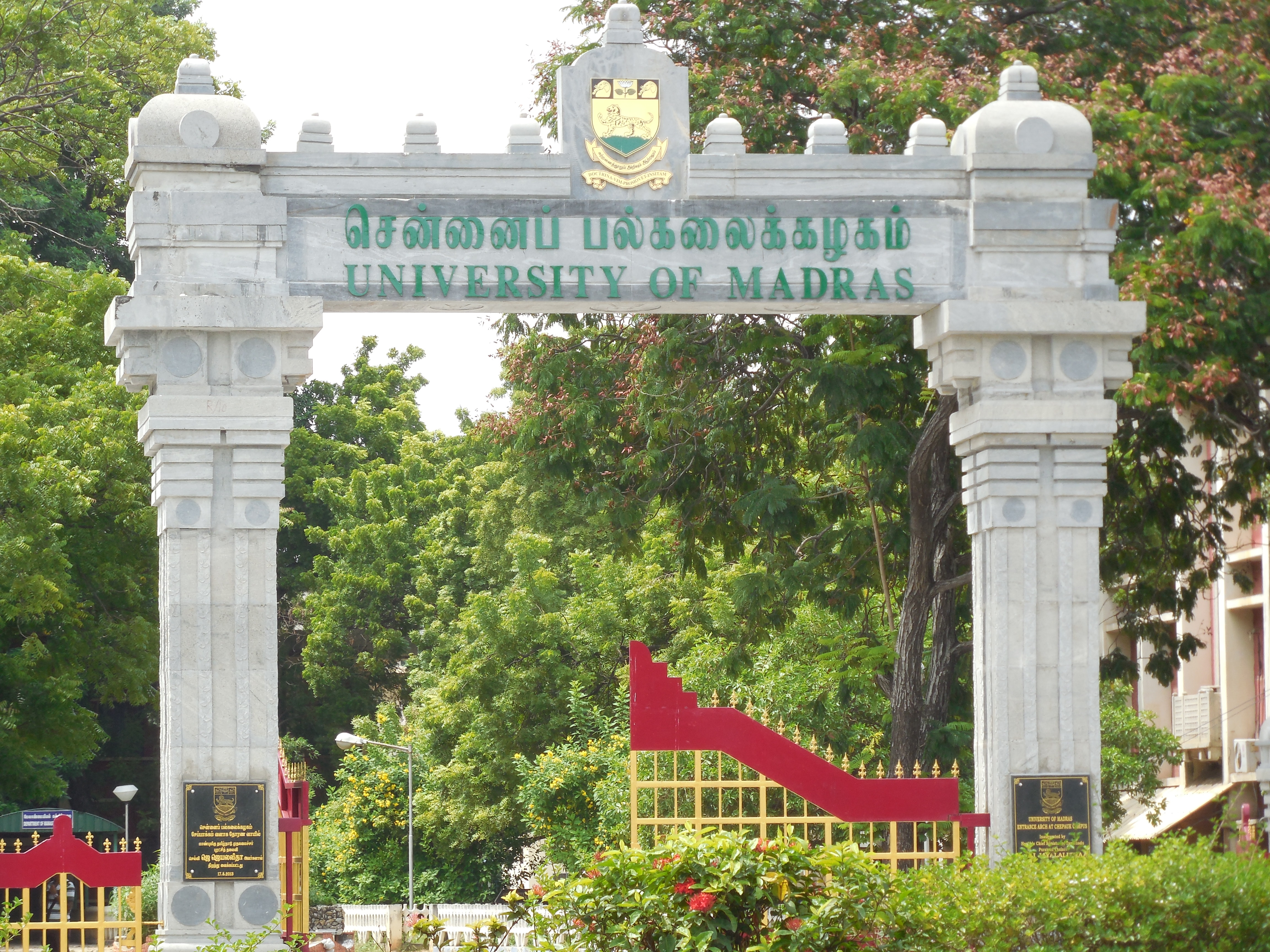
University of Madras Entrance Arch at Chepauk Campus

Mushi Santappa was born on 2 October 1923 in Jonnagiri village in the south Indian state of Andhra Pradesh to Arikeri Basappa-Rajoli couple and graduated in chemistry from the University of Madras in 1943. His master's degree was from Banaras Hindu University in 1946 after which he secured a PhD from the University of London on a Government of India scholarship in 1949, mentored by R. W. West. Staying back in the UK, he obtained another PhD in 1951 from Manchester University, working under the guidance of Meredith Gwynne Evans, a Fellow of the Royal Society; his thesis was based on the physical chemistry of high polymers. Returning to India, he joined the University of Madras as a reader of physical chemistry in 1952 and in 1958, he was transferred to the Madurai Extension Centre (present-day Madurai Kamaraj University) as a professor. He returned to Chennai in 1963 as the head of the department of physical chemistry. Serving as a UGC Senior Professor at the university from 1966 onward, he also worked as a director at Central Leather Research Institute (CLRI) from 1972. In 1979, he was appointed as the vice chancellor of Sri Venkateswara University, Tirupati and on expiry of his tenure in 1980, he returned to Chennai and took up the assignment as the vice chancellor of the University of Madras in 1981 where he stayed till 1984. While working as the UGC professor, he co-founded Avanti Leather Limited, a public limited company involved in the manufacture and export of leather products, in 1976.

Santappa was married to Lakshmi Devi and the couple has three daughters and two sons. He died on 26 February 2017, in Chennai, at the age of 93.

== Legacy ==
Santappa's early researches during his doctoral studies were related to vinyl monomers.4 and its free radical polymerization using light but later, he shifted his focus to the study of kinetics of vinyl polymerization during his stint at the laboratory of Meredith Gwynne Evans. Through these studies, he propounded that vinyl monomers could be polymerized using photo polymerization. He also demonstrated the synthesis of graft copolymers by simple chain transfer process and also studied oxidation of a number of organic substrates.

His researches have been published in over 350 articles (Note: Please see Selected bibliography section) and he guided 59 research scholars on the doctoral studies. Moreover, he published a comprehensive text on the State of the Art in Polymer Science and Engineering in India. Together with Santi K. Palit, a known chemist, he promoted research in polymer science at the Indian Association for the Cultivation of Science and was one of the organizers of the International Symposium on Polymers, under the aegis of the International Union of Pure and Applied Chemistry (IUPAC), held in Chennai in 1983. He served as the chair of the Science and Society project of the Department of Science and Technology and has been an adviser to the Tamil Nadu Pollution Control Board. It was during his tenure as the vice chancellor, the University of Madras established department of Energy and department of Polymer Science and Technology. He was also a national professor and member of the University Grants Commission and sat in the council of the Indian National Science Academy.

== Awards and honors ==
The Council of Scientific and Industrial Research awarded Santappa the Shanti Swarup Bhatnagar Prize, one of the highest Indian science awards, in 1967. He received the Sir J. C. Ghosh Memorial Medal of the Indian Chemical Society in 1982 and the FICCI Award for Science and Technology of the Federation of Indian Chambers of Commerce & Industry in 1985. He was also a recipient of the Sri Kanchi Mahaswami Trust and the Voice Award for Science and Technology of Leather. He received an honorary DLitt from Gulbarga University and the degree of Doctor of Science (honoris causa) from Andhra University, Madras University, Sri Krishna Devaraya University and Madurai Kamaraj University. He was an elected fellow of all the three major Indian sciences academies, Indian Academy of Sciences (1961), Indian National Science Academy (1971) and National Academy of Sciences, India (1983). He was also a fellow of Royal Institute of Chemistry (1970) and the New York Academy of Sciences (1985) and a founder fellow of the Academy of Sciences Chennai. The Society for Polymer Science, India have instituted an annual award, Professor M. Santappa Award, in his honor, which recognizes excellence in research in polymer chemistry.

== Selected bibliography ==
=== Book ===
- M. Santappa (1996). State of the Art in Polymer Science and Engineering in India (PDF). T. R. Publications.

=== Articles ===
- Ranganathan, Hemalatha; Ramasami, T.; Ramaswamy, D.; Santappa, M. (1986). "Hydrogen bonding and tautomeric equilibria in Schiff bases derived from 2-amino pyridines: electronic spectral evidence for substituent effects". Indian Journal of Chemistry. 25: 127–130. ISSN 0376-4710.
- Varadalambedu Srinivasan Nithianandam, Kalathur Sabdham Vangepuram Srinivasan, Koithara Thomas Joseph and Mushi Santappa (August 1981). "Immobilization of trypsin on poly(methyl methacrylate-co-2-acryloylamino-2-methylpropanesulfonic acid". Macromolecular Chemistry and Physics. 182 (8): 2193–2200. doi:10.1002/macp.1981.021820808.
- Devarajan, R.; Balakrishnan, T.; Santappa, M.; Viswanathan, B. (1982). "Gamma radiation-induced bulk polymerization of some methyl aryloxymethacrylates". Journal of Polymer Science. 20 (8): 1863–1873. Bibcode:1982JPoSA..20.1863D. doi:10.1002/pol.1982.170200718.
- Balasubramanian, M.; Nanjan, M. J.; Santappa, M. (1982). "Synthesis, characterization, and fiber studies of certain aromatic polyamides". Journal of Applied Polymer Science. 27 (5): 1423–1432. doi:10.1002/app.1982.070270501.
- Rajendra Prasad, D.; Ramasami, T.; Ramaswamy, D.; Santappa, M. (1982). "Kinetics and mechanism of the equilibration reactions of diaquachromium(III)-Schiff base derivatives, Cr(Schiff base)(H2O)2+, and their conjugate bases with thiocyanate, azide, imidazole, pyridine and nicotinic acid as ligands". Inorganic Chemistry. 21 (3): 850–854. doi:10.1021/ic00133a002.
- Venkatachalapathi, Kora; Nair, Madhavan Sivasankaran; Ramaswamy, Duraiswamy; Santappa, Muchi (1982). "Binary and ternary complexes of chromium(III) involving iminodiacetic acid, L(+)-aspartic acid, L(+)-glutamic acid, or L(+)-cysteine as ligands". Journal of the Chemical Society. 2 (2): 291–297. doi:10.1039/DT9820000291.
- Nair, Madhavan Sivasankaran; Venkatachalapathi, Kora; Santappa, Muchi (1982). "Equilibrium studies of binary and mixed-ligand complexes of zinc(II) involving imidazole, histamine, and L-histidine as ligands". Journal of the Chemical Society. 3 (3): 555–559. doi:10.1039/DT9820000555.

== See also ==
- Meredith Gwynne Evans
- Polymerization
