= M. K. Chandrashekaran =

Indian zoologist (1937–2009)

- Born: 4 September 1937; Salem, Tamil Nadu
- Died: 2 July 2009 (aged 71)
- Awards: Shanti Swarup Bhatnagar Prize
- Scientific career
- Fields: Zoology, chronobiology

Maroli Krishnayya Chandrashekaran (4 September 1937 – 2 July 2009), also known as Shekar or MKC, was an Indian zoologist, regarded as the founder of Indian chronobiology, the study of biological rhythms of organisms. He was a fellow of the Indian Academy of Sciences, and the Third World Academy of Sciences, and in 1979 received the Shanti Swarup Bhatnagar Prize for Science and Technology. Born in Salem, Tamil Nadu, Chandrashekaran earned bachelor's and master's degrees in zoology at Presidency College, Chennai, and a PhD at the University of Madras. He served as a distinguished Reader in the School of Biological Sciences of Madurai Kamaraj University. He served as editor of the Journal of Biosciences from 1991 to 1997 and Resonance: Journal of Science Education from 2003 to 2005.
