= P. Namperumalsamy =

Indian ophthalmologist (1939–2025)

Perumalsamy Namperumalsamy (died 24 July 2025) was an Indian ophthalmologist who specialised in diabetic retinopathy. He was also a retina-vitreous expert. Namperumalsamy was the chairman Emeritus of Aravind Eye Hospital, Madurai. He is known for bringing assembly-line efficiency to eye surgery. In 2010, TIME magazine named Namperumalsamy one of the 100 most influential people in the world.

Under the chairmanship of Namperumalsamy, Aravind Eye Hospital, received the 2010 Conrad N. Hilton Humanitarian Prize, which is awarded annually to an organization that does extraordinary work to alleviate human suffering.

Namperumalsamy died on 24 July 2025, at the age of 85.

== Career ==
A postgraduate fellow of the University of Illinois, Chicago, Namperumalsamy started India's first Low-Vision Aid Centre at the Government Rajaji Hospital in Madurai in 1971. He was the chairman of Aravind Eye Hospital.

Namperumalsamy, an elected fellow of the National Academy of Medical Sciences, was a recipient of Padma Shri Award from the Government of India. He also served as the co-investigator on a research project "Clinical and Laboratory Studies on Eales Disease" in collaboration with the National Eye Institute, in Washington, D.C., United States, the Indian Council of Medical Research and Madurai Kamaraj University.
