= Veerappan Muthukkaruppan =

Indian immunologist

- Born: 1934; Tamil Nadu, India
- Died: 16 June 2024 (aged 89–90)
- Education: Annamalai University (MSc in Zoology, 1957); University of Wisconsin–Madison (PhD)
- Awards: Ranbaxy Research Award; National Institute of Immunology Award for senior scientists; Swami Pranavananda Award
- Scientific career
- Fields: Immunology; Ophthalmology
- Workplaces: Annamalai University; Madurai Kamaraj University; Bharathidasan University; Aravind Medical Research Foundation

Veerappan Muthukkaruppan or VR. Muthukaruppan (1934 - 16 June 2024), also known as Dr. VRM, was an Indian immunologist. He worked for more than three decades as a professor of immunology at Madurai Kamaraj University. His primary research interests have been in the creation of potential vaccines and the use of purified porine for the diagnosis of murine typhoid, for which he has also created a number of monoclonal antibodies. Muthukkaruppan has researched the pathogenesis of Eales disease while attending Madurai Kamaraj University in association with Aravind Eye Hospital in Madurai. As a result, he accepted an invitation to become the Aravind Medical Research Foundation's Director of Research in 1999 and to set up a lab for fundamental studies on eye illnesses. His research interests include the discovery of unique markers for human corneal epithelial stem cells, the immunology and aetiology of ocular inflammation linked to leptospirosis, the prevention of posterior capsular opacification, and the pathogenic mechanisms underlying diabetic retinopathy and Eales disease. From 1994 until 1997, Muthukkaruppan served as the Vice-Chancellor of Tamil Nadu's Bharathidasan University. The Indian Immunology Society elected him as its President from 1981 to 1982.

== Career ==
Investigative Ophthalmology and Visual Sciences' front cover features a photo from Muthukkaruppan's doctoral dissertation on the phenomenon of lens induction and differentiation in vitro. This discovery, which is still highly important to his current study on eye problems, is also mentioned in textbooks on developmental biology. With funding from the National Institutes of Health in the United States, he has launched a significant research programme at Annamalai University to investigate the growth and operation of the lizard's immune system. A chapter of this work was also included in Treatise on Reticuloendothelial System. His primary areas of study interest were thereafter typhoid and leprosy immunology. He proved the impairment of the alternative pathway (CD2) of T-cell activation and the mechanism of T-cell anergy using recombinant Mycobacterium leprae proteins in the polar form (lepromatous leprosy) of leprosy based on his experiments using well-defined leprosy patient samples. Using anti-porin monoclonal antibodies he has created, he has demonstrated the significance of porin (an outer membrane) as a prospective vaccine and in the diagnosis of typhoid disease in the mouse typhoid model. He created the mouse corneal model while a visiting professor at the University of Wisconsin. This work resulted in papers in Science and the Journal of the National Cancer Institute, as well as The American Journal of Pathology's cover image.

== Awards and honours ==
Muthukkaruppan has received the Swami Pranavananda Award, the National Institute of Immunology Award (for the year 1992) for Senior Scientists and the Ranbaxy Research Award (for the year 1989). A National Fellow of the University Grants Commission (from 1986 to 1988), in 1990, Muthukaruppan was also elected as a Fellow of the Indian Academy of Sciences, Bangalore.
