= Karuppannan Veluthambi =

- Born: Tamil Nadu, India
- Education: University of Madras (B.Sc. and M.Sc.); Indian Institute of Science (Ph.D.); National Institutes of Health (Postdoctoral Fellow); Washington State University (Postdoctoral Fellow); Purdue University (Postdoctoral Fellow)
- Scientific career
- Fields: Molecular Biology; Plant Biotechnology
- Workplaces: Madurai Kamaraj University
- Doctoral advisor: Professor Ramesh Maheshwari

Karuppannan Veluthambi is an Indian molecular biologist, plant biotechnologist and a former Professor and INSA-Senior Scientist at the School of Biotechnology (SBT) of Madurai Kamaraj University (MKU).

== Education ==
After earning his B.Sc. and M.Sc. (Botany) from University of Madras in 1975, both of which included a Gold Medal, Veluthambi joined the Indian Institute of Science (IISc), Bangalore, where he went on to get his Ph.D in 1981 under the guidance of Professor Ramesh Maheshwari. He then worked as a Postdoctoral Fellow, from 1981 to 1988, with Dr. John Giovanelli at the National Institutes of Health in Bethesda, United States, Professor BW Poovaiah at Washington State University, United States, and Professor Stanton B. Gelvin at Purdue University, United States. During this time, he outlined the function of calcium and calmodulin in controlling the phosphorylation of proteins in plants and described the intermediates of the T-DNA transfer from Agrobacterium to plants.

== Career ==
After moving back to India in 1988, Veluthambi enrolled in Madurai Kamaraj University, where he served as Professor and Head of the School of Biotechnology. Veluthambi pioneered plant genetic engineering research and teaching programmes while he was at Madurai Kamaraj University. He published the first ever study on T-DNA events known as "long transfers" that occurred outside the left T-DNA border. As his achievements, the Mungbean Yellow Mosaic Virus, which causes Blackgram Yellow Mosaic Disease, was cloned and sequenced by him. It has been demonstrated that blackgram is resistant to the yellow mosaic disease when RNA silencing is mediated by hairpin RNA. He created marker-free transgenic rice, which allays a significant biosafety worry about the horizontal transfer of antibiotic resistance genes to soil microorganisms. In his academic career, Veluthambi also served as the Dean of Research and Development in Madurai Kamaraj University. A DBT Centre for Plant Molecular Biology was created in Madurai Kamaraj University by Veluthambi under the direction of Professor A. Gnanam. He established a Technician Training Programme dedicated in Biotechnology in Madurai as part of DBT's efforts to create the human resource base to teach the Diploma Course in Methods in Biotechnology. With assistance from the Rockefeller Foundation, the United States, and the Indo-Swiss Collaboration in Biotechnology, he started international research programmes at Madurai Kamaraj University. He also served as the Genetic Engineering Appraisal Committee (GEAC)- Co-Chair for Genetically modified rice project.

== Honours ==
- 2002: Elected as Fellow of Indian Academy of Sciences
- 2002: Elected as Fellow of Guha Research Conference
- 2008: Elected as Fellow of Indian National Science Academy
