= Ramasamy Ramaraj =

Indian physical chemist

Ramasamy Ramaraj (born 1956) is an Indian physical chemist and a Professor of Eminence affiliated with the Department of Physical Chemistry at School of Chemistry of Madurai Kamaraj University (MKU). He is noted for his works on photoelectrochemistry and photoelectrocatalysis. He has also worked on chemically modified electrodes, artificial photosynthesis and solar energy conversion and nanomaterials. According to Stanford University's report in 2020, he was listed within the top 2% scientists in the world in his field of research.

== Awards and honours ==
- 1993: Ajit Memorial Lecture Award from Indian Association for the Cultivation of Science
- 1998: Tamil Nadu Scientist Award (TANSA) from Tamil Nadu State Council for Science and Technology, Government of Tamil Nadu
- 2000: Homi J. Bhabha Award for comprehensive contributions in applied sciences from University Grants Commission (India)
- 2000: Chemical Research Society of India (CRSI) Medal from CRSI
- 2011: ERUDITE Scholarship from Government of Kerala, Kerala State Higher Education Council (KSHEC) and Mahatma Gandhi University
- 2000: Fellow of Indian Academy of Sciences
- Fellow of National Academy of Sciences, India
- Fellow of Tamil Nadu Academy of Sciences
- 2010-2015: Member of National Science Education Panel, Indian Academy of Sciences
- 2012-2015: Member of National Committee of IUPAC (INSA-ICSU), Indian National Science Academy
- 2017: Member of Indian National Science Academy
- 2020/2021: Fellow of International Academy of Physical Sciences
