= Rishikesh Narayanan =

Indian neuroscientist and computer engineer

- Born: 5 June 1974 (age 52); Tamil Nadu, India
- Education: Madurai Kamaraj University; Indian Institute of Science; National Centre for Biological Sciences; University of Texas at Austin; Marine Biological Laboratory
- Known for: Studies on Neuronal information processing
- Awards: 2016 Shanti Swarup Bhatnagar Prize
- Scientific career
- Fields: Molecular biophysics; Structural biology
- Workplaces: Indian Institute of Science
- Doctoral advisor: Y. V. Venkatesh; Sumantra Chattarji; Daniel Johnston

Rishikesh Narayanan (born 1974) is an Indian neuroscientist, computer engineer and a professor at the Molecular Biophysics Unit (MBU) of the Indian Institute of Science. He is the principal investigator at the Cellular Neurophysiology Laboratory of MBU where his team is engaged in researches on experimental and theoretical aspects of information processing in single neurons and their networks. The Council of Scientific and Industrial Research, the apex agency of the Government of India for scientific research, awarded him the Shanti Swarup Bhatnagar Prize for Science and Technology, one of the highest Indian science awards, in 2016, for his contributions to biological sciences.

== Biography ==
Rishikesh Narayanan, born on 5 June 1974 at Virudhunagar in the south Indian state of Tamil Nadu, graduated in electronics and communication engineering from Mepco Schlenk Engineering College of Madurai Kamaraj University in 1995 and obtained a master's degree by research in engineering working under Y. V. Venkatesh from the Indian Institute of Science in 1997; his thesis for the degree was Neural architectures for active contour modelling and for pulseencoded shape recognition. He continued his doctoral studies under Venkatesh at IISc and secured a PhD for his thesis, A computational model for the development of simple-cell receptive fields spanning the regimes before and after eye-opening in 2002 after which he enrolled as a post-doctoral fellow under Sumantra Chattarji at National Centre for Biological Sciences. In 2004, he moved to the University of Texas at Austin on a second post-doctoral fellowship where he was mentored by Daniel Johnston. While at the university, he also did a three-month summer research stint at Marine Biological Laboratory during June–August 2008. Returning to India in 2009, he joined IISc as an assistant professor at the Molecular Biophysics Unit, became an associate professor in 2015 and is the head of the Cellular Neurophysiology Laboratory where he hosts a number of research scholars.

Narayanan, who teaches specialized courses at IISc, has published in peer-reviewed journals. He is a member of the Neurobiology Task Force of the Department of Biotechnology of the Government of India and several science societies including Society for Neuroscience, Molecular and Cellular Cognition Society, American Physiological Society and Biophysical Society. He is a reviewer for journals such as eLife, Frontiers in Cellular Neuroscience, Journal of Computational Neuroscience, Journal of Neurophysiology, Journal of Neuroscience, Journal of Physiology, Neuroscience, PLOS Computational Biology and has organized or participated in several conferences and seminars at IISc and outside. He was awarded the Shanti Swarup Bhatnagar Prize for Science and Technology, one of the highest Indian science awards, by the Council of Scientific and Industrial Research in 2016.

== Selected bibliography ==
- Ashhad S, Narayanan R (June 2016). "Active dendrites regulate the impact of gliotransmission on rat hippocampal pyramidal neurons". Proc Natl Acad Sci U S A. 113 (23): 3280–89. Bibcode:2016PNAS..113E3280A. doi:10.1073/pnas.1522180113. PMC 4988595. PMID 27217559.
- Ashhad S, Johnston D, Narayanan R (April 2015). "Activation of InsP₃ receptors is sufficient for inducing graded intrinsic plasticity in rat hippocampal pyramidal neurons". J. Neurophysiol. 113 (7): 2002–13. doi:10.1152/jn.00833.2014. PMC 4416566. PMID 25552640.
- Rishikesh Narayanan, Daniel Johnston (December 2007). "Long-term potentiation in rat hippocampal neurons is accompanied by spatially widespread changes in intrinsic oscillatory dynamics and excitability". Neuron. 56 (6): 1061–75. doi:10.1016/j.neuron.2007.10.033. PMC 2430016. PMID 18093527.
- Rishikesh Narayanan, Daniel Johnston (June 2008). "Active dendrites: colorful wings of the mysterious butterflies". Trends Neurosci. 31 (6): 309–16. doi:10.1016/j.tins.2008.03.004. PMID 18471907. S2CID 2604361.
- Rishikesh Narayanan, Daniel Johnston (December 2008). "The ascent of channels with memory". Neuron. 60 (5): 735–8. doi:10.1016/j.neuron.2008.11.017. PMID 19081367. S2CID 10063080.
- Rishikesh Narayanan, Daniel Johnston (August 2010). "The h Current Is a Candidate Mechanism for Regulating the Sliding Modification Threshold in a BCM-Like Synaptic Learning Rule". J Neurophysiol. 104 (2): 1020–33. doi:10.1152/jn.01129.2009. PMC 2934916. PMID 20554832.
- Narayanan R, Dougherty KJ, Johnston D (December 2010). "Calcium store depletion induces persistent perisomatic increases in the functional density of h channels in hippocampal pyramidal neurons". Neuron. 68 (5): 921–35. doi:10.1016/j.neuron.2010.11.033. PMC 3024579. PMID 21145005.

== See also ==
- Hippocampus
- Dendrite
