= Rajan Sankaranarayanan =

Indian biologist

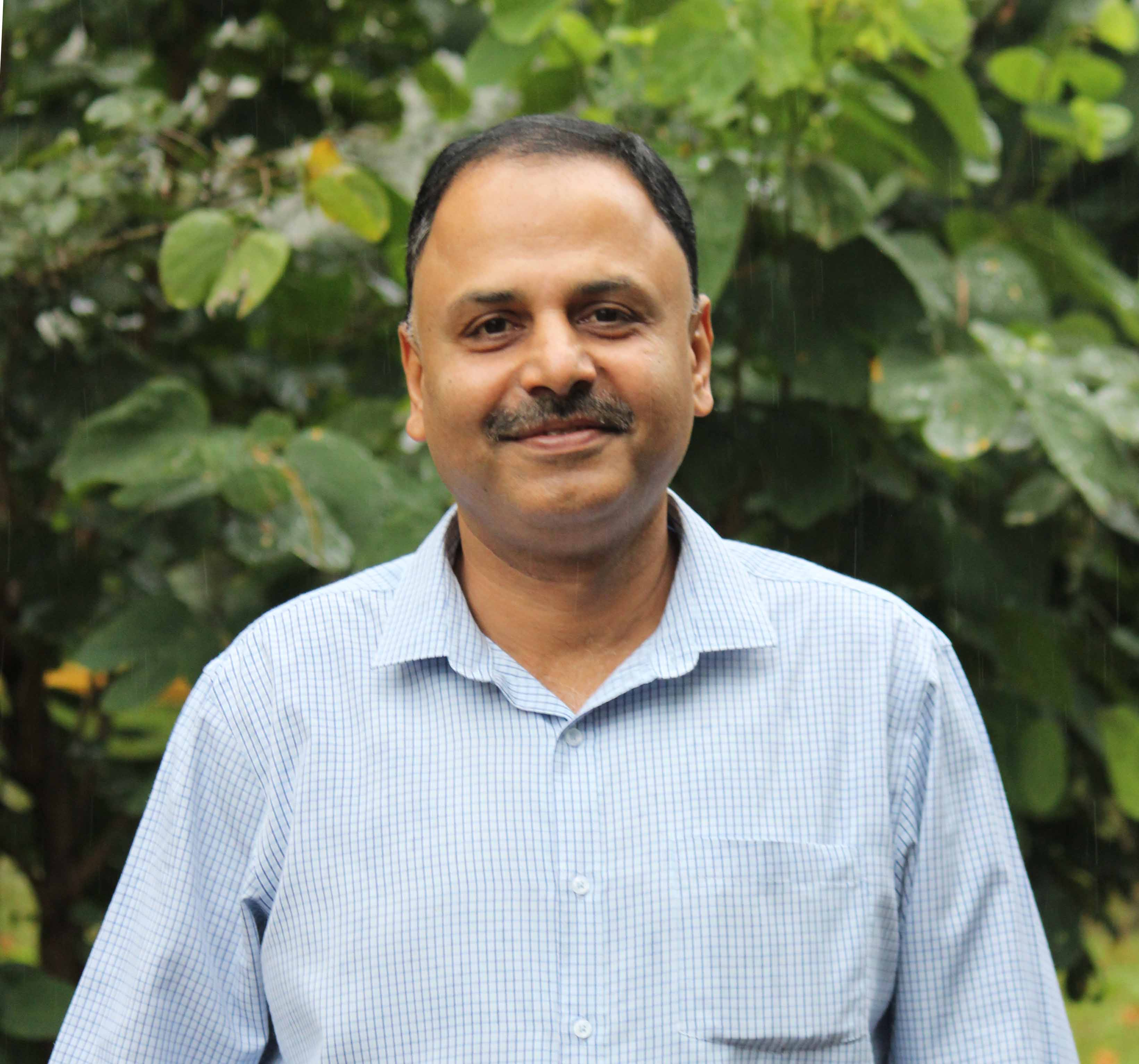
- Rajan Sankaranarayanan in 2022
- Born: Papanasam Project, Tamil Nadu, India
- Education: Indian Institute of Science
- Known for: Chiral proofreading during translation
- Awards: Infosys Prize (2020); G. D. Birla Award (2018); G.N. Ramachandran Gold Medal (2015); Shanti Swarup Bhatnagar Prize (2011); National Bioscience Award for Career Development (2008)
- Scientific career
- Fields: Structural Biology
- Workplaces: Centre for Cellular and Molecular Biology, Hyderabad; MKU
- Doctoral advisor: M. Vijayan
- Website: https://sankarslab.weebly.com/

Rajan Sankaranarayanan is an Indian structural biologist and a group leader at the Centre for Cellular and Molecular Biology (CCMB) in Hyderabad. He is known for his research in the field of protein translation, especially for his contribution in chiral proofreading during protein biosynthesis. In 2020, Sankaranarayanan was awarded the Infosys Prize in life sciences, the most prestigious award that recognizes achievements in science and research, in India.

== Biography ==
He was born in Papanasam project, Tirunelveli, Tamilnadu. He pursued his master's degree in Madurai Kamaraj University (MKU) followed by his Ph.D. in Indian Institute of Science (IISc) under the guidance of Prof. M. Vijayan. He did his postdoctoral research with Prof. Dino Moras at Laboratoire de Biologie Structurale, IGBMC, Strasbourg, France. During that period, he worked on the structure of threonyl-tRNA synthetase. In 2002, he moved back to India, since then he is working as a group leader at the Centre for Cellular and Molecular Biology (CCMB) in Hyderabad.

== Research and career ==
Sankaranarayanan's group is interested in understanding unique proofreading mechanisms that are operational in biological systems to maintain quality control during the translation of the genetic code. These processes are important in understanding how D-amino acids are kept away from getting incorporated during protein biosynthesis. Most of his research work is focused on understanding the mechanistic, physiological and evolutionary role of 'chiral proofreading' systems.

His laboratory has elucidated the mechanism of D-aminoacyl-tRNA deacylase 1 (DTD1), where he has shown how an invariant 'cross-subunit' Gly-cisPro dipeptide captures the chiral centre of incoming D-aminoacyl-tRNA. His group also identified a paralog of DTD1 in animals known as Animalia-specific-tRNA Deacylase (ATD), which plays a crucial role in protecting animals from mistranslation associated with oxidative stress and its implications in the evolution of multicellularity in Animalia.

The group has also identified the role of archaeal-derived chiral proofreader D-aminoacyl-tRNA deacylase 2 (DTD2) in removing N-ethyl adducts formed on D-aminoacyl-tRNA by acetaldehyde, an anaerobic fermentation intermediate. Furthermore, the group has also went on to show how these two chiral proofreaders are involved in the optimization of cellular networks during the emergence and evolution of organelles in two major branches of eukaryotes, i.e., opisthokonta and plants.

His laboratory is also interested in understanding the roles of a class of lipid metabolising enzymes called Fatty acyl-AMP ligases (FAAL), which are involved in the production of lipidic secondary metabolites in bacteria. The group has identified the mechanistic underpinnings of FAAL's incredible specificity towards its substrate, acyl carrier protein and rejecting CoA, despite being chemically identical.

Recently, the group has also identified the role of a FAAL-like homolog in eukaryotes called Disco-interacting protein 2 (DIP2), in regulating a specific pool of diacylglycerols by converting it into triacylglycerols, thereby maintaining cellular homeostasis.

== Awards and recognition ==
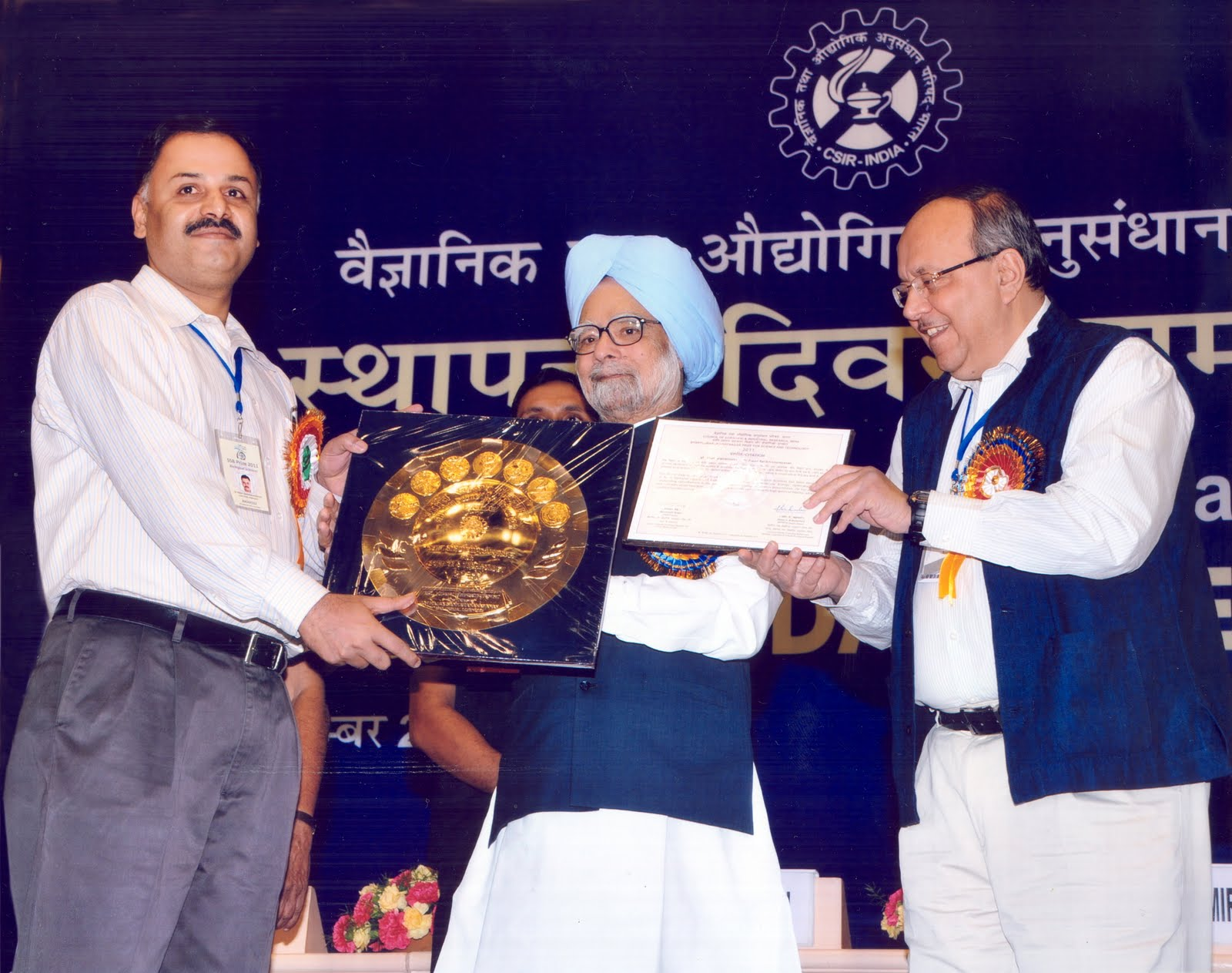
Rajan Sankaranarayanan receiving Shanti Swarup Bhatnagar Prize from Manmohan Singh in 2011

Sankaranarayanan was awarded the Shanti Swarup Bhatnagar Prize for Science and Technology (2011), the highest science award in India, in the biological sciences category. He is also the recipient of the National Bioscience Award for Career Development. In 2020, Sankaranarayanan has been awarded the Infosys Prize in life sciences, the most prestigious award that recognizes achievements in science and research, in India. In the year 2022, he was elected as an associate member of the esteemed European Molecular Biology Organization (EMBO).

In December 2020, Sankaranarayanan was awarded Infosys Prize for Life Sciences – for his fundamental contributions towards understanding one of the most basic mechanisms in biology.
