= Gunasekaran Paramasamy =

Indian academic (born 1954)

P. Gunasekaran
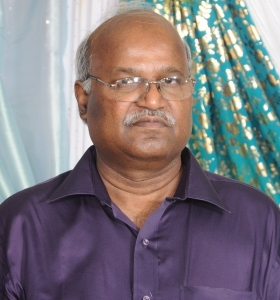
- Born: 1954 (age 71–72); Madurai
- Citizenship: India
- Education: Ph.D, D.Sc
- Alma mater: Madurai Kamaraj University, Haryana Agricultural University
- Occupations: Professor Emeritus, Madurai Kamaraj University, Madurai, Tamil Nadu
- Employer: Madurai Kamaraj University
- Website: http://pgs.paramg.com

P. Gunasekaran is an Indian microbiologist and former Vice-Chancellor, VIT Bhopal University, Madhya Pradesh. He was a Senior Professor of Microbiology at Madurai Kamaraj University, Madurai, India. He served as Vice chancellor of Thiruvalluvar University Vellore 2012–2015. He has thirty three years of teaching and research experience in Microbiology, Biotechnology and Genomics. He was a recipient of the Tamil Nadu Scientist Award (TANSA) from the Tamil Nadu State Council for Science and Technology, Government of Tamil Nadu in 1999.
