= Thavamani Jegajothivel Pandian =

Indian geneticist and ecologist (born 1939)

- Born: 15 June 1939 (age 87); Palamedu, Madurai district, Tamil Nadu, India
- Education: University of Madras; Kiel University; Biologische Anstalt Helgoland
- Known for: Sexuality, Sex Determination and Sex Differentiation in fish
- Awards: 1978 IARI Hooker Award; 1984 Shanti Swarup Bhatnagar Prize; 1985 ECI Prize; 1991 WorldFish Naga Award; 1994 Bahl Memorial Gold Medal; 1997 Tamil Nadu Scientist Award
- Scientific career
- Fields: Bioenergetics; Animal ecology
- Workplaces: Bangalore University; Madurai Kamaraj University; Columbia University; Ghent University; Oxford University; University of South Carolina; Ecology Institute, Germany; Kyoto University; MS Swaminathan Research Foundation

Thavamani Jegajothivel Pandian (born 15 June 1939), a retired professor of Madurai Kamaraj University (MKU), is an Indian geneticist and ecologist, known for his pioneering studies in bioenergetics and animal ecology. A recipient of the WorldFish Naga Award, he is a former chairman of the Task Force Committee on Aqua and Marine Biotechnology of the Department of Biotechnology of the Government of India, a former president and a fellow of The World Academy of Sciences and an elected fellow of the Indian National Science Academy, National Academy of Sciences, India, Indian Academy of Sciences and the National Academy of Agricultural Sciences. The Council of Scientific and Industrial Research, the apex agency of the Government of India for scientific research, awarded him the Shanti Swarup Bhatnagar Prize for Science and Technology, one of the highest Indian science awards, in 1984, for his contributions to biological sciences.

== Biography ==
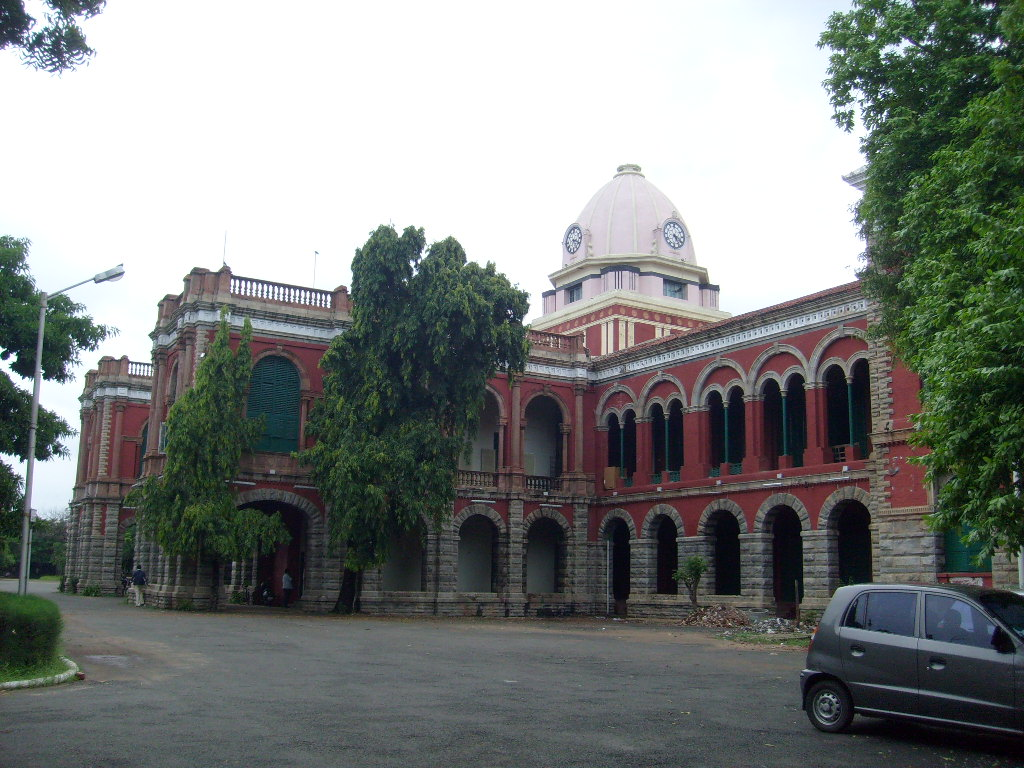
Presidency College, Chennai.

Thavamani Jegajothivel Pandian, born on 15 June 1939 in Palamedu, a small town in Madurai district of the South Indian state of Tamil Nadu to Kumarasamy Thavamani and Valliammal couple, graduated in science from Thiagarajar College, Madurai in 1960 and completed his master's degree from Presidency College, Chennai in 1962, both the colleges affiliated to Madras University, before securing a doctoral degree (PhD) in 1965 from the same university. His post-doctoral studies were at Bilogische Anstalt, Helgoland, Germany and he obtained the degree of Doctor of Natural Sciences (Dr. rer. nat.) from Kiel University in 1968. Returning to India, he started his career at Bangalore University as a lecturer in 1968 and moved to his home town in 1971 to join Madurai Kamaraj University as a reader where he served till his superannuation, holding positions of a professor (1976–92) and a senior professor (1994–95). In between, he served as a visiting scientist at Oxford University (1973), as a visiting professor at Columbia University and University of South Carolina (1981–82), as an overseas associate at Kyoto University (1989) and as a UNESCO lecturer at Ghent University (2003–04). Post his superannuation, he held the position of a National Professor of the Indian Council of Agricultural Research from 1996 to 2002, an Emeritus Scientist of the Council of Scientific and Industrial Research from 2002 to 2005 and an INSA senior scientist from 2005 to 2009. (Note: Based at Annamalai University) He has chaired the Task Force Committee on Aqua and Marine Biotechnology of the Department of Biotechnology and is associated with Ecology Institute, Germany as a visiting scientist since 1985 and with MS Swaminathan Research Foundation as a visiting professor since 1996. He also served the councils of the Indian National Science Academy in 1990 and National Academy of Agricultural Sciences from 1998 to 2000.

Pandian is married to Muthu Shanthakumari and the couple has a son, Sathish Kinne Pandian who is a urologist. The family lives in Madurai.

== Legacy ==
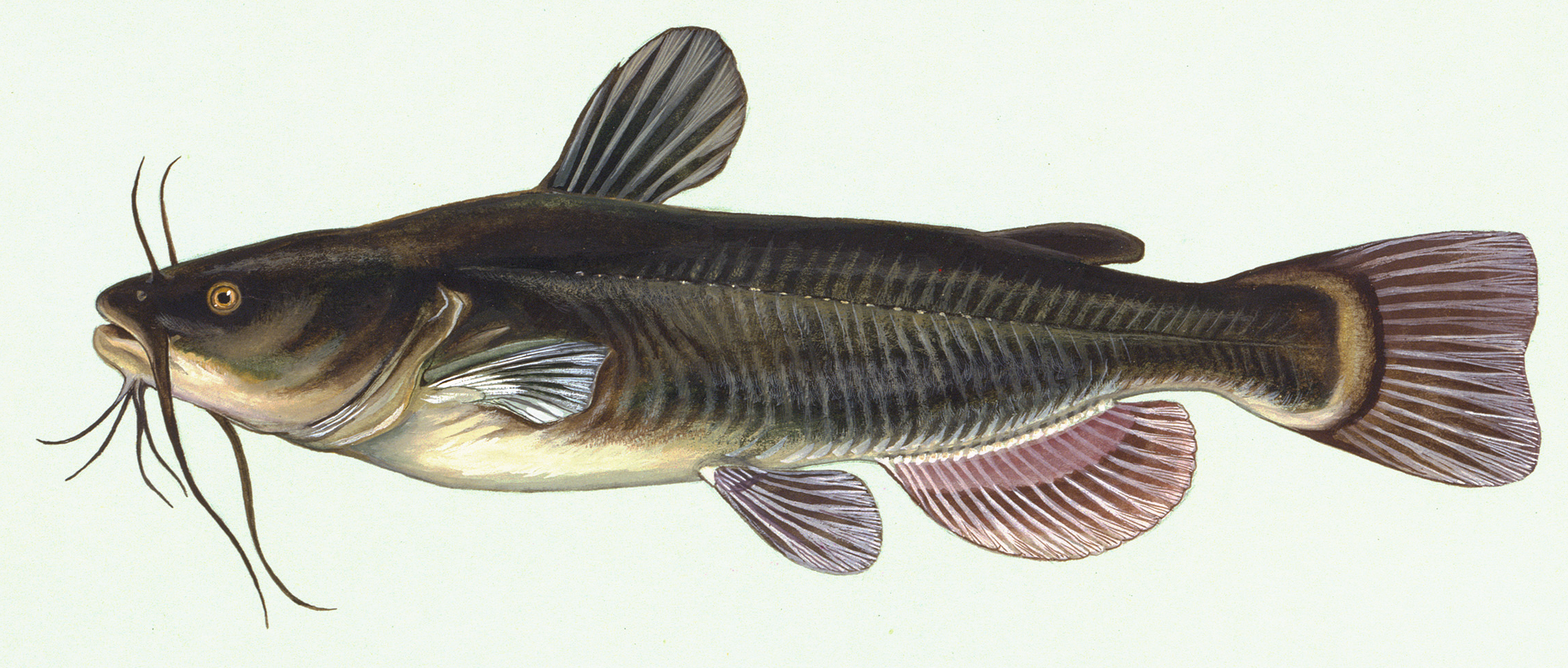
A species of catfish (Ameiurus melas)

Pandian's early work was in the field of bioenergetics and focusing on metabolism, he developed a model for predicting the transformation of food energy into growth. He published his research findings in Marine Biology journal of Springer in an article, Intake, digestion, absorption and conversion of food in the fishes Megalops cyprinoides and Ophiocephalus striatus, which eventually became a citation classic. Subsequently, shifting his attention to the sexuality of fish, he demonstrated that the sperm survived in catfish for over 240 days if they were preserved at -20^{o} degree Celsius and could still be fertilized, a discovery which had commercial relevance in places where liquid nitrogen is not easily available. Later, he created the first transgenic fish from preserved sperm and genome-inactivated eggs of compatible species which helped him to generate interspecific and intergeneric androgenetic clones. Furthering the researches, he created supermales (with YY chromosomes) of tilapia, barbs and guppies (Poecilia reticulata) and superfemales (ZZ) in molly (Poecilia sphenops) species, reportedly for the first time in India. He used these monosex organisms to mass-produce monosex progenies in catfish. He is also credited with the cloning and production of fish-based growth hormone gene transformation vectors and with the restoration of rosy barb species using preserved sperms and genome-inactivated eggs of tiger barb. His researches are documented in a number of books which include Animal Energetics: Bivalvia through reptilia, Animal Energetics: Protozoa through insecta, Sex Determination in Fish, Genetic Sex Differentiation in Fish, Environmental Sex Differentiation in Fish and Reproduction and Development in Crustacea, and over 250 science articles; ResearchGate, an online repository of scientific papers, has listed 133 of them.

Pandian was one among the biologists who founded the Asian Fisheries Society (AFS), a non-profit scientific society for the promotion of fisheries and aquaculture, in 1984 and sat in its fourth council from 1992 to 1995. He is a former member of the governing body of the Indian Council of Agricultural Research and the academic councils of the Jawaharlal Nehru University and the Central Institute of Fisheries Education. He has been associated with several science journals including Journal of Asian Fisheries Science, Hydrobiologia, Journal of Experimental Marine Biology and Ecology, Marine Ecology Progress Series, Indian Journal of Marine Sciences and Journal of Scientific and Industrial Research and is a former associate editor of Current Science, consultant editor of Korean Journal of Aquaculture and a guest editor of Current Science and Hydrobiologia. He coordinated the USERS Project of the Department of Science and Technology during 2012–14 and has mentored 36 scholars in their doctoral researches. He is also a Member of the Governing Council and an Advisor of the Centre for Scientific & Applied Research of PSN College of Engineering and Technology, Tirunelveli and the Inspire Internship Camp of Velammal Institute of Technology, Panchetti and he has attended several seminars and conferences to deliver keynote addresses, notably the National Seminar on Sustainability of Seafood Production in 2006 and the CSIR Foundation Day lecture in 2012.

== Awards and honors ==
Pandian, who held the National Lectureship and the National Fellowship of the University Grants Commission of India during 1985–86 and 1989–91 respectively, received the Hooker Award of the Indian Agricultural Research Institute in 1978. The Council of Scientific and Industrial Research awarded him the Shanti Swarup Bhatnagar Prize, one of the highest Indian science awards in 1984 for his contributions to bioenergetics and animal ecology. The next year, he received the ECI Prize of the Ecology Institute where he has been serving as an adviser since then. WorldFish awarded him the Naga Award in 1991 and three years later, he received the 1994 K.N. Bahl Memorial Gold Medal of the Society of Biosciences, Delhi. The Indian Council of Agricultural Research selected him as National Professor in 1996 (Note: ICAR National Professorship was from 1996 to 2002) and the Council for Science and Technology of the Government of Tamil Nadu chose him for the Tamil Nadu Scientist Award in 1997.

Pandian is an elected fellow of a number of major Indian science academies. The National Academy of Sciences, India elected him as a fellow in 1984 and he became a fellow of the Indian Academy of Sciences, the next year. Two years later, he was elected as a fellow of the Indian National Science Academy, which was followed by his election as fellow by the National Academy of Agricultural Sciences in 1992. In 1999, he received the fellowship of The World Academy of Sciences.

== Selected bibliography ==
=== Books ===
- T. J. Pandian (1987). Animal Energetics: Bivalvia through reptilia. Academic Press. ISBN 978-0-12-544792-8.
- T. J. Pandian; F. John Vernberg (1987). Animal Energetics: Protozoa through insecta. Academic Press. ISBN 978-0-12-544791-1.
- T. J. Pandian (2 January 2005). Fish Genetics and Aquaculture Biotechnology. Science Publishers. ISBN 9781578083725.
- T. J. Pandian (20 July 2010). Sexuality in Fishes. Science Publishers. ISBN 9781578086856.
- T. J. Pandian (2 September 2011). Sex Determination in Fish. CRC Press. ISBN 978-1-4398-7919-1.
- T. J. Pandian (5 June 2012). Genetic Sex Differentiation in Fish. CRC Press. ISBN 978-1-57808-799-0.
- T. J. Pandian (26 February 2013). Endocrine Sex Differentiation in Fish. CRC Press. ISBN 9781466575608.
- T. J. Pandian (22 December 2014). Environmental Sex Differentiation in Fish. CRC Press. ISBN 978-1-4822-5438-9.
- T. J. Pandian (5 April 2016). Reproduction and Development in Crustacea. CRC Press. ISBN 978-1-4987-4829-2.

=== Articles ===
- Pandian T. J. (October 1983). "Intake, digestion, absorption and conversion of food in the fishes Megalops cyprinoides and Ophiocephalus striatus". Marine Biology. 1: 16–32. doi:10.1007/bf00346690. S2CID 83957482.
- Santhakumar Kirankumar, Thavamani Jegajothivel Pandian (October 2002). "Effect on growth and reproduction of hormone immersed and masculinized fighting fish Betta splendens". J. Exp. Zool. 293 (6): 606–16. Bibcode:2002JEZ...293..606K. doi:10.1002/jez.10181. PMID 12410610.
- Venugopal Thayanithy; Thayanithy Venugopal; Vikas Anathy; Santhakumar Kirankumar; Thavamani Jegajothivel Pandian (June 2004). "Growth enhancement and food conversion efficiency of transgenic fish Labeo rohita". J Exp Zool A. 301 (6): 477–90. Bibcode:2004JEZ...301..477V. doi:10.1002/jez.a.78. PMID 15181642.
- Santhakumar Kirankumar, Thavamani Jegajothivel Pandian (December 2004). "Production and progeny testing of androgenetic rosy barb Puntius conchonius". J Exp Zool A. 301 (12): 938–51. Bibcode:2004JEZ...301..938K. doi:10.1002/jez.a.117. PMID 15562453.
- Clifton Justin David, Thavamani Jegajothivel Pandian (January 2006). "GFP reporter gene confirms paternity in the androgenote Buenos Aires tetra, Hemigrammus caudovittatus". J Exp Zool A. 305 (1): 83–95. Bibcode:2006JEZA..305...83D. doi:10.1002/jez.a.247. PMID 16358274.
- Thavamani Jegajothivel Pandian (April 2008). "Endosulfan suppresses growth and reproduction in zebrafish". Current Science. 94 (7).

== See also ==
- Bioenergetics
- Transgene
