= Plant Molecular Biology =

- Discipline: Plant biology
- Language: English

Publication details
- History: 1981–present
- Publisher: Springer Science+Business Media
- Impact factor: 4.076 (2020)

Standard abbreviations
- ISO 4: Plant Mol. Biol.

Indexing
- ISSN: 0022-2836

Links
- Journal homepage

The Plant Molecular Biology is a peer-reviewed scientific journal covering all aspects of plant molecular biology. It was established in 1981 and is published by Springer Science+Business Media. The editor-in-chief is Motoaki Seki.

According to the Journal Citation Reports, the journal has a 2020 impact factor of 4.076.
