= P. N. Rangarajan =

Indian biochemist, virologist and professor

- Born: 15 April 1963 (age 63); Bengaluru, Karnataka, India
- Education: Indian Institute of Science; Salk Institute for Biological Studies
- Known for: Studies on eukaryotic gene expression
- Awards: 2001 N-BIOS Prize; 2007 Shanti Swarup Bhatnagar Prize
- Scientific career
- Fields: Biochemistry; Virology
- Workplaces: Howard Hughes Medical Institute; Indian Institute of Science

Pundi Narasimhan Rangarajan (born 15 April 1963) is an Indian biochemist, virologist and a professor at the department of biochemistry of the Indian Institute of Science. Prof Rangarajan is currently the Chairman of the Department of Biochemistry at Indian Institute of Science. Known for his research on eukaryotic gene expression, Rangarajan is an elected fellow of all the three major Indian science academies viz. National Academy of Sciences, India, Indian Academy of Sciences and Indian National Science Academy. The Council of Scientific and Industrial Research, the apex agency of the Government of India for scientific research, awarded him the Shanti Swarup Bhatnagar Prize for Science and Technology, one of the highest Indian science awards for his contributions to Medical Sciences in 2007. (Note: Long link - please select award year to see details)

== Biography ==
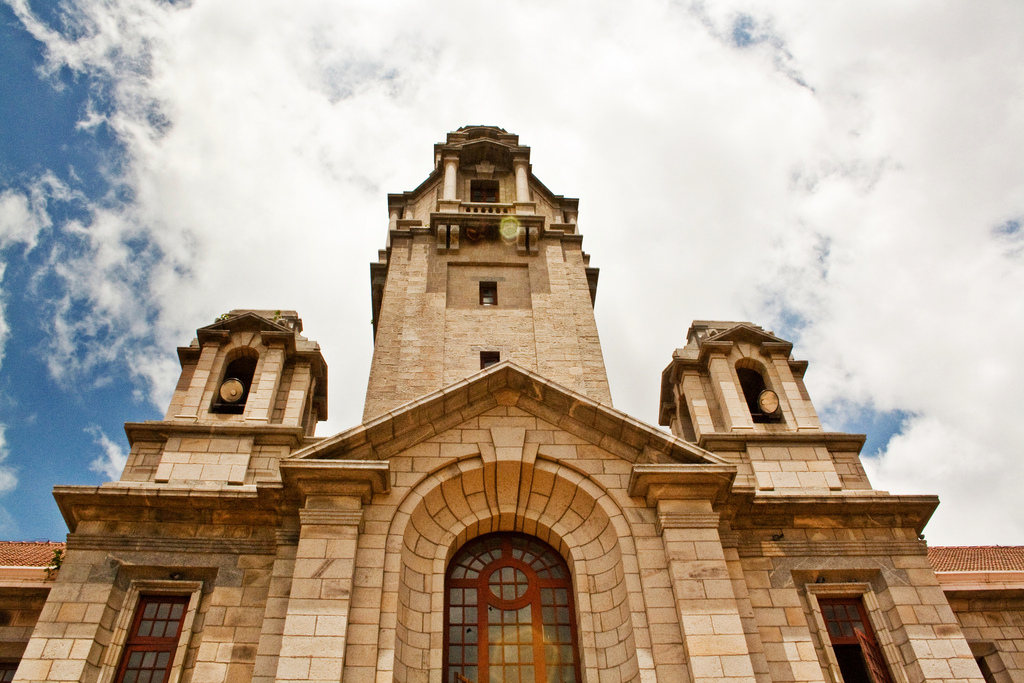
Indian Institute of Science

P. N. Rangarajan, born in Bengaluru in the south Indian state of Karnataka, secured a PhD from the Indian Institute of Science (IISc) in 1989 and did his post doctoral work at Salk Institute for Biological Studies during 1990-92. After serving Howard Hughes Medical Institute as a research associate for a year, he returned to India to join IISc at the department of biochemistry in 1993 where he is a professor. At IISc, he has been carrying out research on how neurotropic viruses induce changes in eukaryotic gene expression in humans. He leads a team of scientists engaged in the studies of Pichia pastoris, a methylotrophic yeast species, with regard to its transcription factors and the regulation of carbon metabolism. He has also done extensive work on vaccine development against infectious diseases such as rabies, hepatitis B and Japanese encephalitis and he and his colleagues were successful in developing a new DNA-based vaccine against rabies. Later, they improved the vaccine performance by combining the DNA-based rabies vaccine with a controlled quantity of inactivated virus prepared through cell culture. The work earned Rangarajan and his colleagues Patent Cooperation Treaty and Indian patents and the vaccine, reportedly cheaper to produce than conventional cell culture rabies vaccines, is being marketed by Indian Immunologicals Limited, under the brand name, Dinarab. His studies have been documented by way of a number of articles (Note: Please see Selected bibliography section) of which many have been listed by online article repositories such as Google Scholar and ResearchGate.

Rangarajan's work has attracted research by other scientists and he has delivered invited speeches or keynote addresses including the lecture on Gene Regulation in Eukaryotes: Diversity in general Transcription factors at IIT Madras and the address on Transcriptional interference in the methylotrophic yeast, Pichia pastoris at Indian Institute of Science Education and Research, Thiruvananthapuram in October 2012. He was the co-convenor of the lecture workshop on Recent Advances in Biotechnology of Health and Disease (BHD-2011) organized by Madurai Kamaraj University in 2011 and has been involved in conducting open courses on Eukaryotic Gene Expression.

Rangarajan is married to Radha and the couple has two children, Karthik and Meghana. The family lives in Rajajinagar in Bengaluru.

== Awards and honors ==
Rangarajan received the National Bioscience Award for Career Development of the Department of Biotechnology in 2001. The National Academy of Sciences, India elected him as a fellow in 2002. The Council of Scientific and Industrial Research awarded him Shanti Swarup Bhatnagar Prize, one of the highest Indian science awards in 2007. The Indian Academy of Sciences elected him as a fellow the same year and he became an elected fellow of the Indian National Science Academy in 2017. (Note: Long link - please click R and select PN Rangarajan to see details)

== Selected bibliography ==
- Saha, Sougata; Ramanathan, Anand; Rangarajan, Pundi N. (2006). "Regulation of Ca2+/calmodulin kinase II inhibitor α (CaMKIINα) in virus-infected mouse brain". Biochemical and Biophysical Research Communications. 350 (2): 444–449. doi:10.1016/j.bbrc.2006.09.066. PMID 17010311.
- Nagendrakumar, S. B.; Madhanmohan, M.; Rangarajan, P. N.; Srinivasan, V. A. (2009). "Genetic analysis of foot-and-mouth disease virus serotype A of Indian origin and detection of positive selection and recombination in leader protease- and capsid-coding regions". Journal of Biosciences. 34 (1): 85–101. doi:10.1007/s12038-009-0011-9. PMC 7090849. PMID 19430121.
- Nagaraj, Viswanathan Arun; Prasad, Dasari; Rangarajan, Pundi N.; Padmanaban, Govindarajan (2009). "Mitochondrial localization of functional ferrochelatase from Plasmodium falciparum". Molecular and Biochemical Parasitology. 168 (1): 109–112. doi:10.1016/j.molbiopara.2009.05.008. PMID 19523497.
- Nagaraj, Viswanathan Arun; Prasad, Dasari; Arumugam, Rajavel; Rangarajan, Pundi N.; Padmanaban, Govindarajan (2010). "Characterization of coproporphyrinogen III oxidase in Plasmodium falciparum cytosol". Parasitology International. 59 (2): 121–127. doi:10.1016/j.parint.2009.12.001. PMID 20006984.
- Vijay Kumar, N.; Rangarajan, P. N. (2011). "Catabolite repression of phosphoenolpyruvate carboxykinase by a zinc finger protein under biotin- and pyruvate carboxylase-deficient conditions in Pichia pastoris". Microbiology. 157 (12): 3361–3369. doi:10.1099/mic.0.053488-0. PMID 21948049.

== See also ==
- Rabies vaccine
- Foot-and-mouth disease
- Plasmodium falciparum
- Catabolite repression
