= S. Krishnaswamy (biologist) =

Indian biologist, academic

Prof. S. Krishnaswamy VC, MKU
- Occupations: Professor, Vice-Chancellor (MKU)

Prof. S. Krishnaswamy is an Indian biologist, academic and a Vice-Chancellor of Madurai Kamaraj University (MKU).

== Revolution in biological sciences in India ==
A pioneer in the unification of several biological sciences fields; in 1967, Krishnaswamy founded India's first integrated department of biology in Madurai Kamaraj University. Early in the 1960s, the Madurai Kamaraj University's School of Biological Sciences began in modest fashion as the PG extension centre of the Madurai campus of the University of Madras' Zoology Department. Krishnaswamy, also referred to as SK, was the one in charge. He had a lot of dreams and visions. He conceptualised the idea of teaching Biology as an integrated field during that time, and possibly even now when the education of life sciences is divided into Botany, Zoology, Microbiology, etc. In SK's view, the fields of botany, zoology and other sciences are simply diverse perspectives on the living world. He believed that examining living things as a whole was more significant than just looking at plants or animals separately. In 1966, SK established the Department of Biological Sciences, the nation's first integrated department, when the PG extension centre became the Madurai University (later Madurai Kamaraj). After only ten years, the UGC Expert Committee recommended that the Department of Biological Sciences be renamed the School of Biological Sciences (SBS).
