= S. Ramachandran (scientist) =

Indian scientist

S. Ramachandran (9 September 1934 – 2016) was an Indian scientist responsible for the setting of the Department of Biotechnology under the Government of India. He became the first secretary to the department in 1986. He was awarded the Padma Bhushan in 2011, the third highest civilian award given by the Government of India, for his contributions to Indian science. The DBT has initiated an annual S. Ramachandran Lecture series in homage to its founder. He has mentored many eminent scientists in various premier Indian institutes including Indian Institute of Science, Madurai Kamaraj University, Jawaharlal Nehru University, University of Pune, University of Delhi, University of Hyderabad, Anna University, Maharaja Sayajirao University of Baroda, Centre for Cellular and Molecular Biology and Institute of Microbial Technology.
