= Kuppamuthu Dharmalingam =

Indian biologist (born 1949)

- Born: 3 January 1949 (age 77); Pollachi, Tamil Nadu, India
- Education: Gandhi Kala Nilayam High School; Thiagarajar College, Madurai; Madurai Kamaraj University; Tufts University School of Medicine
- Known for: Induction of mutagenic DNA repair in Escherichia coli Proteomics of eye diseases
- Awards: 1992 Shanti Swarup Bhatnagar Prize
- Scientific career
- Fields: Molecular genetics; Genetic engineering
- Workplaces: Madurai Kamaraj University; Aravind Medical Research Foundation
- Doctoral advisor: J. Jayaraman

Kuppamuthu Dharmalingam (born 3 January 1949) is an Indian proteomicist, geneticist, academic and the founder of Centre of Excellence in Bioinformatics at Madurai Kamaraj University. He is known for his contributions in the fields of eye disease proteomics and mutagenic DNA repair in Escherichia coli. He is an elected fellow of the Indian Academy of Sciences and the National Academy of Sciences, India. The Council of Scientific and Industrial Research, the apex agency of the Government of India for scientific research, awarded him the Shanti Swarup Bhatnagar Prize for Science and Technology, one of the highest Indian science awards, in 1992, for his contributions to biological sciences.

== Biography ==
Born on 3 January 1949 in Pollachi, a border town in the South Indian state of Tamil Nadu, Kuppamuthu Dharmalingam did his schooling at Gandhi Kala Nilayam High School and secured his graduate and master's degrees in zoology from Thiagarajar College, Madurai before enrolling for PhD at Madurai Kamaraj University (MKU) under the guidance of J. Jayaraman, working on yeast mitochondrial membrane biogenesis. After obtaining his doctoral degree, he did his post-doctoral research with Edward D. Goldberg at Tufts University School of Medicine on genetics of bacteriophages. Returning to India, he joined MKU and spent his entire academic career there but had a short stint at University of Geneva in between. During his early researches on Escherichia coli, a gram-negative bacterium, he discovered the induction of mutagenic DNA repair during restriction of nonglucosylated T4 DNA and the alleviation of restriction by SOS functions. Subsequently, he studied the pathogenesis of Mycobacterium leprae using proteomics tools and discovered the single nucleotide polymorphism in the unique small alpha crystalline like heat shock protein in the gram-positive bacterium. His researches have been documented in over 200 articles; ResearchGate, an online repository of scientific papers, has listed 48 of them.

It was during his tenure at the MKU, the Centre of Excellence in Bioinformatics was established at the university in 1986. He is a life member of the Proteomics Society, India (PSI), editor of its newsletter, a former member of its executive council and was the convener of the workshop, Clinical Proteomics: Methods and Applications, conducted by PSI in October 2014. He is a Distinguished Research Professor of the Department of Biotechnology and an elected fellow of the Indian Academy of Sciences and the National Academy of Sciences, India. The Council of Scientific and Industrial Research awarded him the Shanti Swarup Bhatnagar Prize, one of the highest Indian science awards, in 1992.

Post retirement, Dharmalingam has been working since 2013 as a director of Aravind Medical Research Foundation, a Tamil Nadu-based research centre, ophthalmic hospital chain and a World Health Organization collaborating centre for the prevention of blindness.

== See also ==
- Proteomics
- Edward D. Goldberg
