= Madurai Kamaraj University =

Public state university in Tamil Nadu, India

Coordinates: 9.940392°N 78.010536°E

- Motto: "To Seek Truth Is Knowledge"
- Type: Public research university
- Established: 1966; 60 years ago
- Chancellor: Governor of Tamil Nadu
- Vice-Chancellor: Vacant
- Location: Madurai, Tamil Nadu, India
- Campus: Urban
- Website: www.mkuuniversity.org www.mkudde.org

Madurai Kamaraj University (MKU) is a public state university located in Madurai city, in southern Tamil Nadu, India, that was established in 1966. MKU is one of the 15 universities in India with the University with Potential for Excellence status, which was awarded by the University Grants Commission (UGC) in India. In 2021, the university was awarded an 'A++' grade from the National Assessment and Accreditation Council (NAAC) in its 4th cycle.

== History ==
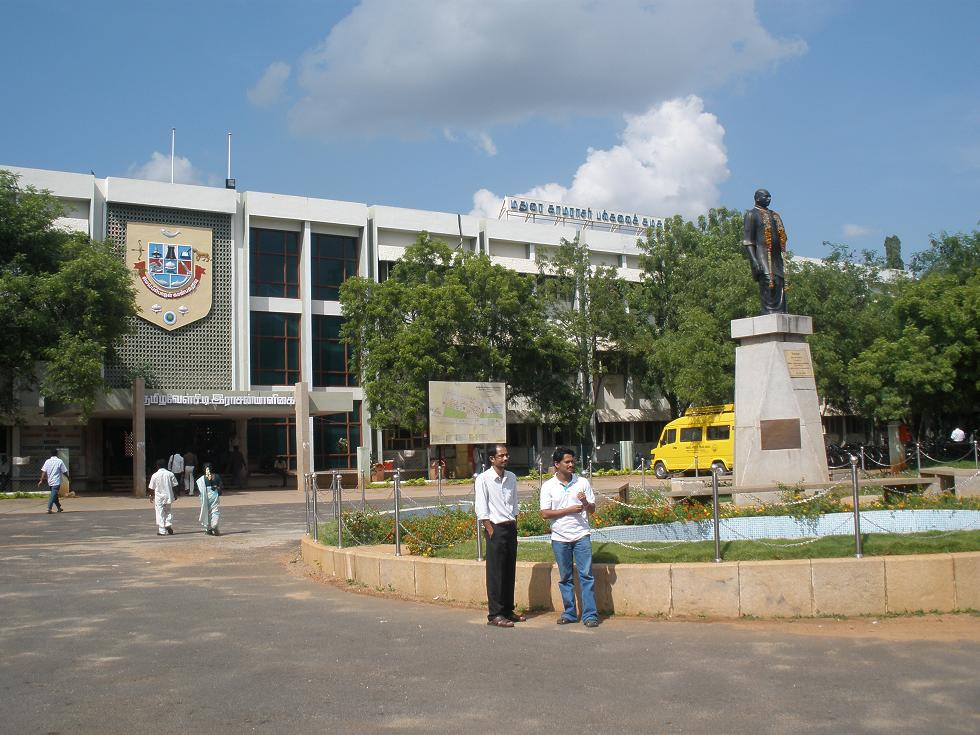
Madurai Kamaraj University-front view

The university was established in the year 1966 as Madurai University. In 1978, the name was changed to Madurai Kamaraj University to honor K. Kamaraj, former Chief Minister of Madras State.

== Rankings ==
University rankings

General – India
- NIRF (Overall) (2023): 94
- NIRF (Universities) (2024): 63

The National Institutional Ranking Framework (NIRF) ranked Madurai Kamaraj University 63rd among universities in India in 2024. The QS World University Rankings ranked the university 310 in Asia in 2025.

== Academics ==
There are 121 colleges and institutions under MKU which include 16 aided colleges, 24 autonomous colleges (including both government and self-financed), 4 constituent colleges, 1 MKU college, 5 MKU evening colleges, 57 self-financed colleges and 14 approved institutions. Currently, the university consists of 77 renowned Departments and 20 renowned Schools as a whole.

=== Vice chancellors ===
Sl. No.	Name	Period of Service
1	T. P. Meenakshisundaram	01.02.1966 to 18.01.1971
2	Mu. Varadarajan (Dr. Mu.Va)	01.02.1971 to 10.10.1974
3	S. V. Chittibabu	24.02.1975 to 23.02.1978
4	V. C. Kulandaiswamy	31.03.1978 to 02.03.1979
5	V. Sp. Manickam	17.08.1979 to 30.06.1982
6	J. Ramachandran (MKU)	29.08.1982 to 28.08.1985
7	S. Krishnaswamy	04.10.1985 to 20.11.1988
8	M. Lakshmanan	20.01.1989 to 19.01.1992
9	M. D. K. Kuthalingam	20.01.1992 to 19.01.1995
10	K. Aludiapillai	19.05.1995 to 18.05.1998
11	M. Salihu	24.07.1998 to 23.07.2001
12	P. K. Ponnuswamy	01.02.2002 to 31.01.2005
13	P. Maruthamuthu	07.03.2005 to 06.03.2008
14	R. Karpaga Kumaravel	20.04.2008 to 19.04.2011
15	Kalyani Mathivanan	09.04.2012 to 08.04.2015
16	P. P. Chellathurai	27.05.2017 to June 14, 2018
17	Prof Dr. M. Krishnan	02.01.2019
18	Prof Dr. J. Kumar	

== Notable alumni and faculties ==
- Samrat Chaudhary,24th Chief Minister of Bihar
- T. N. Seshagopalan, very eminent Carnatic vocalist and Sangeetha Kalanidhi awardee
- T. P. Meenakshisundaram, 1st Honorable Vice-Chancellor of MKU and Padma Bhushan awardee
- Mu. Varadarajan, 2nd Honorable Vice-Chancellor of MKU and recipient of Sahitya Akademi Award for Tamil literature
- V. C. Kulandaiswamy, 4th Honorable Vice-Chancellor of MKU and Padma Bhushan awardee
- S. Krishnaswamy, 7th Honorable Vice-Chancellor of MKU and legendary biologist
- Arumugam Manthiram, fellow of Royal Society of Chemistry, delivered the 2019 Nobel Lecture in Chemistry on behalf of Chemistry Nobel Laureate John B. Goodenough.
- A. S. Gnanasambandan, Tamil writer, scholar and literary critic
- G. Balasubramanian, former Vice Chancellor of Tamil University, Thanjavur, in Tamil Nadu, India (4 October 2018 – 3 October 2021)
- G. S. Venkataraman, Padma Shri awardee
- Veerappan Muthukkaruppan, renowned immunologist
- Charle, Indian actor
- AR Chelliah, Indian religious leader
- Dharmakkan Dhanaraj, Indian Old Testament Scholar
- R. M. Pitchappan, eminent immunogeneticist
- Kunthala Jayaraman, eminent biotechnologist
- Kuppamuthu Dharmalingam, the Shanti Swarup Bhatnagar laureate (for Biological Sciences)
- P. Sathasivam, 40th Chief Justice of India
- Rajan Sankaranarayanan, the Shanti Swarup Bhatnagar laureate (for Biological Sciences) and Infosys Prize winner
- Rajiah Simon, the Shanti Swarup Bhatnagar laureate (for Physical Sciences)
- Rishikesh Narayanan, the Shanti Swarup Bhatnagar laureate (for Biological Sciences)
- Ramamirtha Jayaraman, the Shanti Swarup Bhatnagar laureate (for Biological Sciences)
- Tho. Paramasivan, Tamil anthropologist, writer, folklorist, archeologist and professor
- Mohan Raghavan, Malayalam film director
- Santhosh George Kulangara, is an Indian traveller, television producer, director, broadcaster, editor, publisher and he is the founder and managing director of Safari TV and also serves as the head of Labour India Publications, an educational publisher for school children.
- Mushi Santappa, the Shanti Swarup Bhatnagar laureate (for Chemical Sciences)
- Nirmal Selvamony, Indian scholar and academician
- S. A. Choudum, eminent Mathematician and Graph Theorist
- S. Kameswaran, renowned ENT surgeon and Padma Shri awardee
- H. Raja, eminent politician
- Gunasekaran Paramasamy, eminent scientist
- Karuppannan Veluthambi, eminent Plant Biotechnologist and Molecular Biologist
- Ram Rajasekharan, N-BIOS awardee
- Mukul Roy, former Union Minister of Railways and Member of West Bengal Legislative Assembly
- R. Sankararamakrishnan, N-BIOS awardee
- Syed Zahoor Qasim, Padma Bhushan awardee
- Kaustuv Sanyal, N-BIOS awardee
- K. S. Krishnan, Padma Bhushan awardee, Fellow of the Royal Society and the Shanti Swarup Bhatnagar laureate (for Physical Sciences)
- M. K. Chandrashekaran, the Shanti Swarup Bhatnagar laureate (for Biological Sciences)
- Sonajharia Minz, eminent Adivasi activist and current Vice Chancellor of Sido Kanhu Murmu University
- Thamizhachi Thangapandian, Indian Tamil poet, lyricist, orator, politician and writer
- Thavamani Jegajothivel Pandian, the Shanti Swarup Bhatnagar laureate (for Biological Sciences)
- Vijayalakshmi Navaneethakrishnan, Padma Shri awardee
- Ganapathy Baskaran, the Shanti Swarup Bhatnagar laureate (for Physical Sciences)
- Gopi Shankar Madurai, Indian equal rights and Indigenous rights activist
- Govindappa Venkataswamy, Padma Shri awardee and founder of Aravind Eye Care System
- Vijay Siva, Carnatic music vocalist
- Vivek, Indian actor and Padma Shri awardee
- Kailasavadivoo Sivan, eminent Indian space scientist and current Secretary (Space) and former Chairman of the Indian Space Research Organisation and Space Commission
- Kumaravel Somasundaram, N-BIOS awardee
- Nazarene Soosai, Roman Catholic Bishop
- A. R. Venkatachalapathy, Indian historian
- Shiv Nadar, Padma Bhushan awardee and Indian billionaire industrialist and philanthropist
- S. Viyalendiran, Sri Lankan-Tamil politician
- M. Thiurumalai, Tamil scholar, writer and professor
- Sendurai Mani, Indian-American oncologist
- Ayyalusamy Ramamoorthy, Robert W. Parry Collegiate Professor of Chemistry and Biophysics at the University of Michigan, Ann Arbor and fellow of the Royal Society of Chemistry.
- K.K. Pillay, eminent Indian historian, headed the Department of History in University of Madras and the first President of South Indian History Congress in the premises of the School of Historical Studies, Madurai Kamaraj University
- Sankaran Krishnaswamy, eminent computational biologist
- Ganapathy Marimuthu, renowned chronobiologist
- Ramasamy Ramaraj, Physical chemist and Professor of Eminence
- Shabaana Khader, notable Indian-American microbiologist

== Recipients of Shanti Swarup Bhatnagar Prize ==
- Mushi Santappa (Chemical Sciences)
- M. K. Chandrashekaran (Biological Sciences)
- Ramamirtha Jayaraman (Biological Sciences)
- T. J. Pandian (Biological Sciences)
- Kuppamuthu Dharmalingam (Biological Sciences)
- R. Sankaranarayanan (Biological Sciences)

== Other associated people ==
- S. Ramachandran, Padma Bhushan awardee
- Ch. Mohan Rao, the Shanti Swarup Bhatnagar laureate (for Medical Sciences), Executive Committee member for the Centre of Excellence of the Bioinformatics Centre (founded by Prof. Kappamuthu Dharmalingam), Madurai Kamaraj University, 2004
- P.N. Rangarajan, the Shanti Swarup Bhatnagar laureate (for Medical Sciences) and N-BIOS awardee, Coconvenor of the lecture workshop on Recent Advances in Biotechnology of Health and Disease (BHD-2011) organized by Madurai Kamaraj University in 2011
- Sathees Chukkurumbal Raghavan, the Shanti Swarup Bhatnagar laureate (for Biological Sciences), Convenor of the lecture workshop on Recent Advances in Biotechnology of Health and Disease (BHD-2011) organized by Madurai Kamaraj University in 2011
- Erwin Bünning, eminent German chronobiologist, invited by M. K. Chandrashekaran to India in 1978, to conduct the Biological Oscillation workshop in Madurai Kamaraj University
- Dorairajan Balasubramanian, the Shanti Swarup Bhatnagar laureate (for Chemical Sciences), Padma Shri awardee and member of the advisory committee for 'International Conference on Genome Biology 2019 (ICGB-2019)' organized by the School of Biological Sciences, Madurai Kamaraj University
- Dipankar Chatterji, the Shanti Swarup Bhatnagar laureate (for Biological Sciences), Padma Shri awardee and member of the advisory committee for 'International Conference on Genome Biology 2019 (ICGB-2019)' organized by the School of Biological Sciences, Madurai Kamaraj University
- Seyed Ehtesham Hasnain, the Shanti Swarup Bhatnagar laureate (for Biological Sciences), Padma Shri awardee and member of the advisory committee for 'International Conference on Genome Biology 2019 (ICGB-2019)' organized by the School of Biological Sciences, Madurai Kamaraj University
- Rakesh Bhatnagar, member of the advisory committee for 'International Conference on Genome Biology 2019 (ICGB-2019)' organized by the School of Biological Sciences, Madurai Kamaraj University
- Tapas Kumar Kundu, the Shanti Swarup Bhatnagar laureate (for Biological Sciences), N-BIOS awardee and member of the advisory committee for 'International Conference on Genome Biology 2019 (ICGB-2019)' organized by the School of Biological Sciences, Madurai Kamaraj University
- Siddhartha Roy, the Shanti Swarup Bhatnagar laureate (for Biological Sciences) and member of the advisory committee for 'International Conference on Genome Biology 2019 (ICGB-2019)' organized by the School of Biological Sciences, Madurai Kamaraj University
- Rakesh Mishra, member of the advisory committee for 'International Conference on Genome Biology 2019 (ICGB-2019)' organized by the School of Biological Sciences, Madurai Kamaraj University
- P. Namperumalsamy, Padma Shri awardee and the Co-investigator on a research Project “Clinical and Laboratory Studies on Eales Disease” in collaboration with National Eye Institute, Washington, United States and Indian Council of Medical Research and Madurai Kamaraj University.

== International collaborations ==
- University of Oxford: Discovery of first Indians in 2008
- LMU Munich: Genomics research and studies
- University of Tubingen: Collaborative research and faculty-student exchange
- Harvard University: Ancient DNA research
- University of Melbourne: Student exchange and research
- University of Oslo and Institute for Energy Technology: Indo-Norwegian International Online Conference on “Functional materials for energy, environment And biomedical applications" (FARAON 2022)
- Algoma Algal Biotechnology, University of Wisconsin: From 2017
- Eastern University, Sri Lanka: From 2017
- Uppsala University: From 2018
- South Dakota School of Mines: Staff exchange and collaboration, joint research activities and publications, student exchange
- Museum and Institute of Zoology of the Polish Academy of Sciences: Research collaboration
- National Cancer Institute, National Institutes of Health: Research collaboration
- Okayama University: Research collaboration
- University of Veterinary Medicine, Hannover: Research collaboration
- Loyola University: Research collaboration
- Max Planck Institute for Heart and Lung Research: Research collaboration
- Graduate Medical School, Singapore: Cancer Genomics Project

== See also ==
- American College, Madurai
- Sri S. Ramaswamy Naidu Memorial College
- University of Madras
- Indian Institute of Science
