= Y. P. Viyogi =

Biography of Indian Maithil Physicist

Yogendra Pathak Viyogi
- डॉक्टर योगेन्द्र पाठक वियोगि
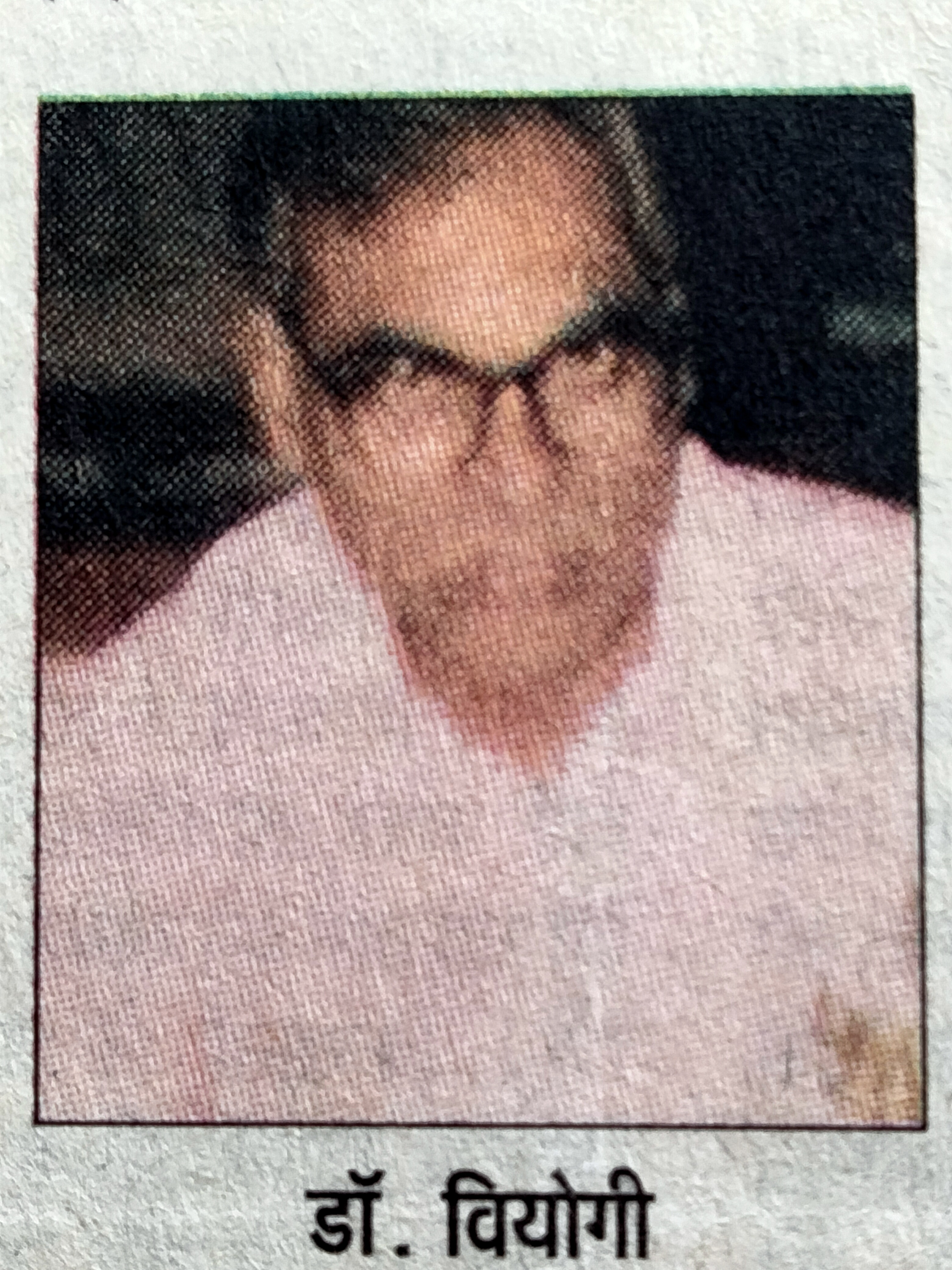
- Indian physicist Dr. Y P Viyogi
- Born: Yogendra; 1948 (age 77–78); Madhubani district
- Citizenship: Indian
- Education: Bihar University
- Known for: ALICE experiment at CERN: WA93 experiment; Photon Multiplicity Detector
- Awards: Helmholtz-Hulmboldt Research Award of Germany
- Scientific career
- Fields: Experimental Nuclear Physics
- Workplaces: Institute of Physics, Bhubaneswar Indian National Science Academy Bhabha Atomic Research Centre, Mumbai Department of Atomic Energy, Government of India

Yogendra Pathak Viyogi (Y. P. Viyogi) is an Indian physicist at Indian National Science Academy. He is specialized in the field of experimental nuclear physics.

"It is certainly a matter of great pride for all of us to be a part of the discovery of anti-alpha, the heaviest anti-matter to have been seen in terrestrial experiments."

— Y P Viyogi, in Subhra Priyadarshini, Indian scientists in antimatter discovery, Nature India

== Early life ==
He was born in the Madhubani district of the Mithila region in the state of Bihar in India, in the year 1948. He completed his primary education at his own village.

He received his post graduate degree in physics from Bihar University in Muzaffarpur.

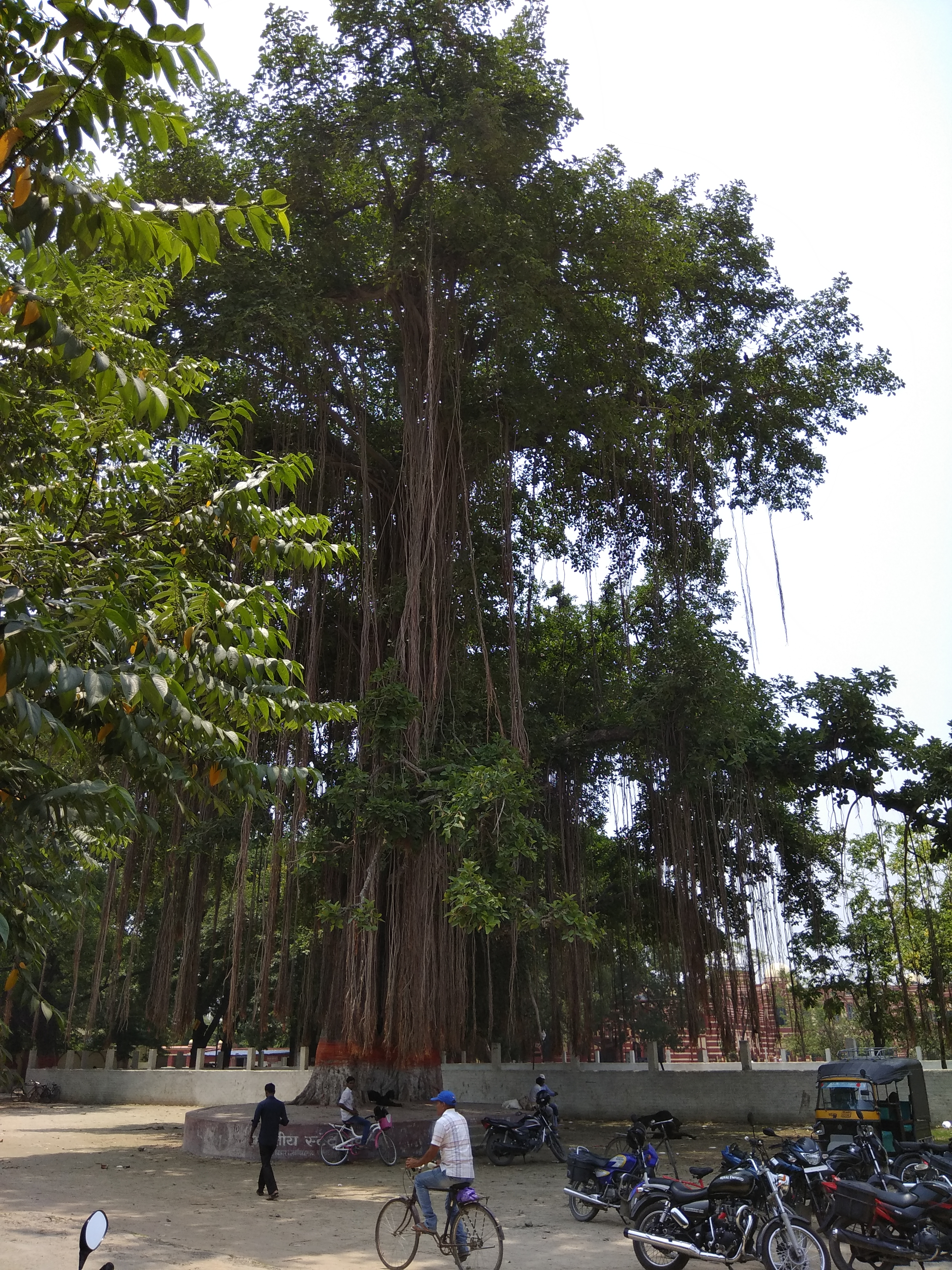
View of the campus of the Bihar University in Muzaffarpur.

== Scientific career ==
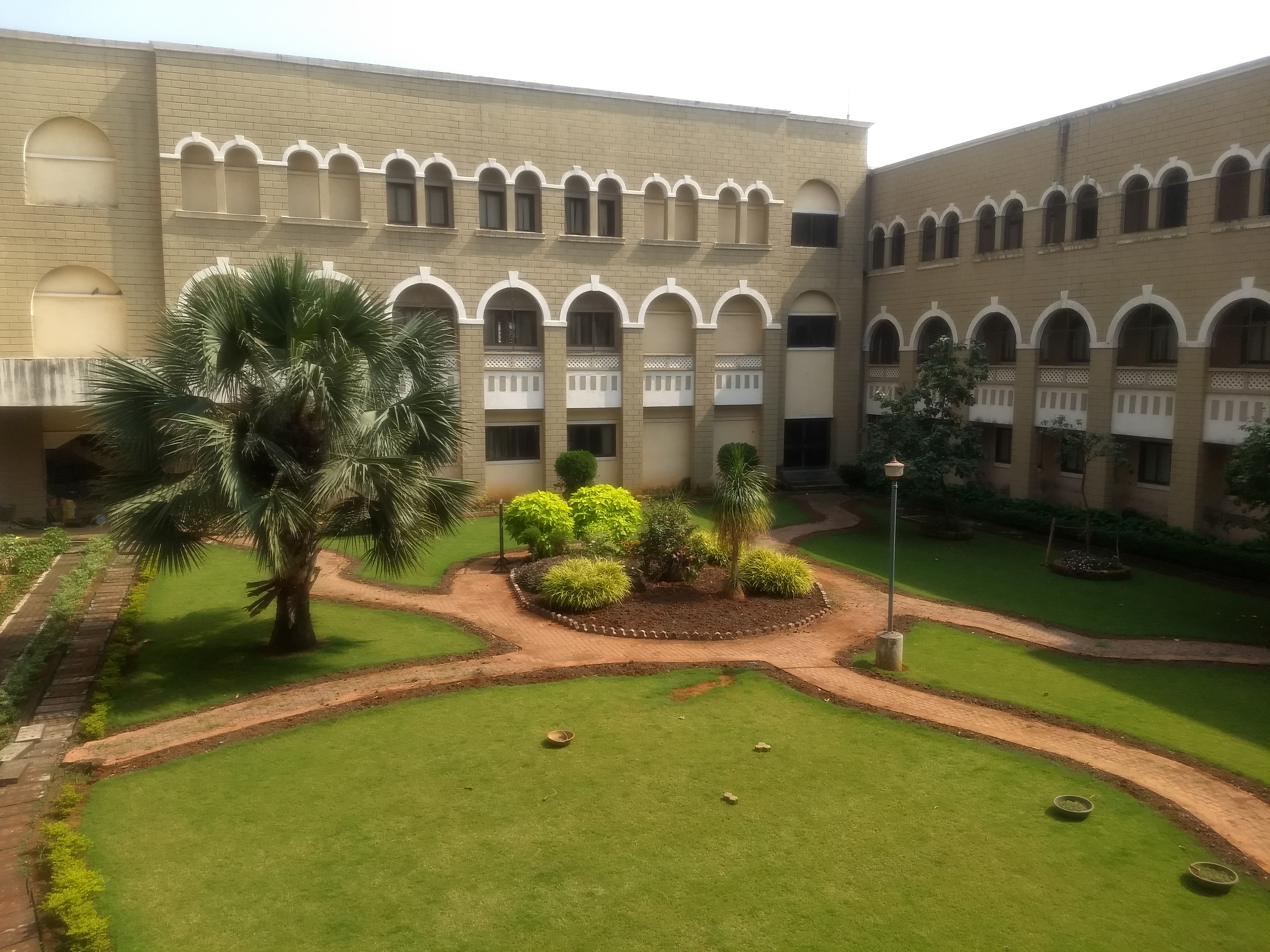
BARC traning school.

He joined the 15th batch of Training School Programme of Bhabha Atomic Research Centre, Mumbai in 1971. He was trained in experimental nuclear physics at BARC and at Lawrence Berkeley laboratory, USA. He moved to Kolkata to work at the Variable Energy Cyclotron Centre, a unit of the Department of Atomic Energy and obtained his PhD in 1984 from the University of Calcutta. He was also a postdoctoral fellow at GANIL Laboratory in France from 1984 to 1986. He was Director of Institute of Physics, Bhubaneswar during June 2006 – June 2009. He retired from service in October 2012 as Outstanding Scientist at VECC Kolkata.

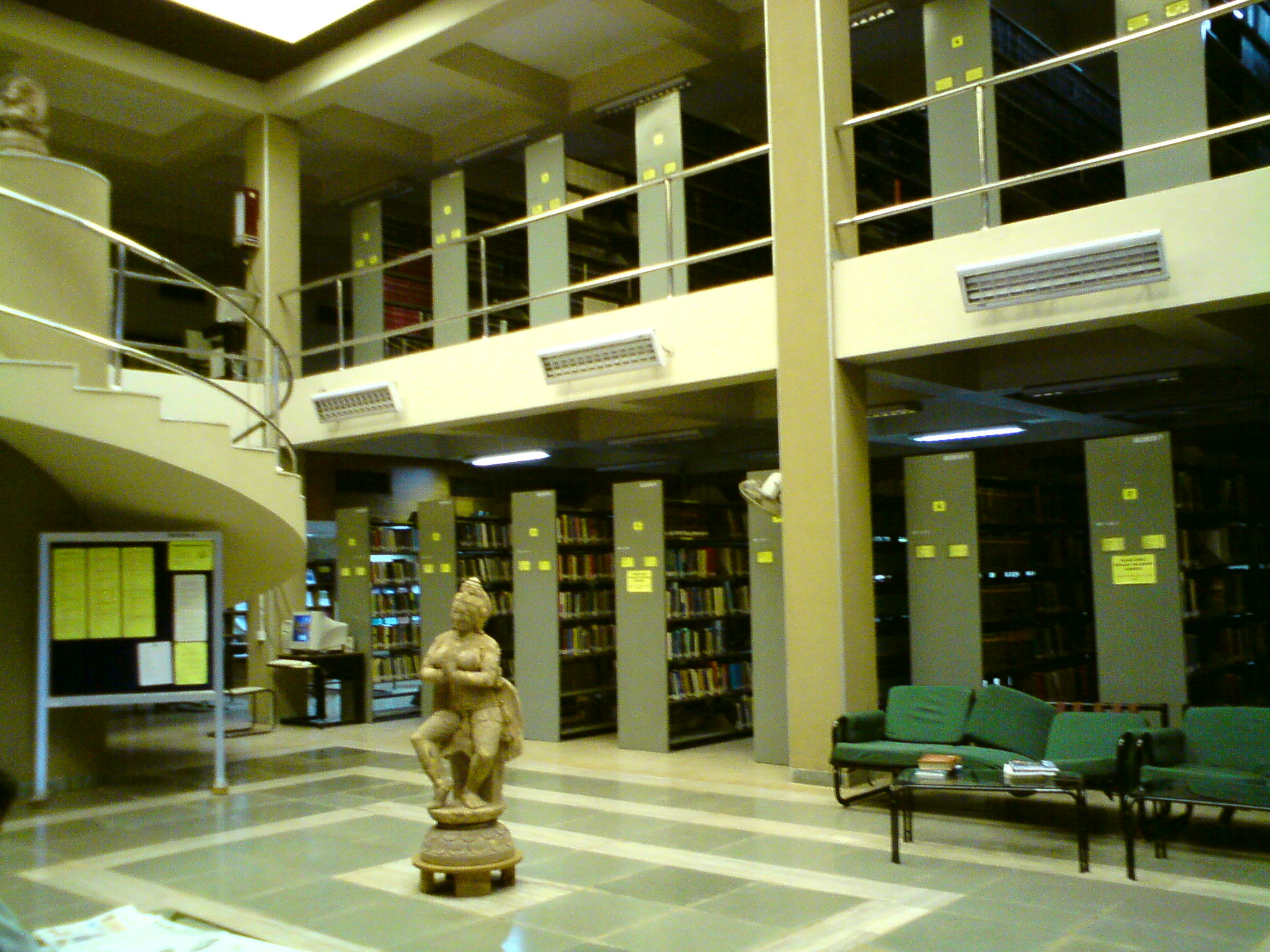
Library at the Institute of Physics, Bhubaneswar.

== Scientific works ==
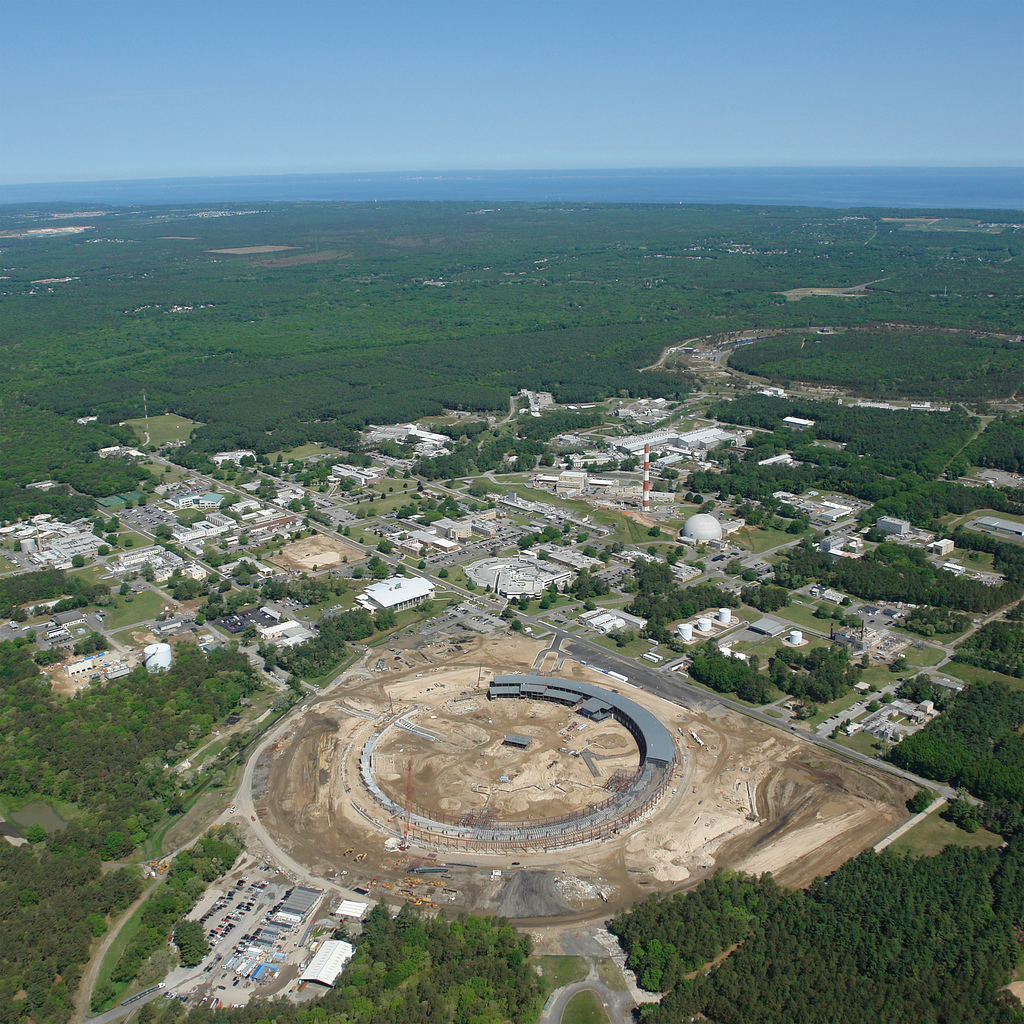
Aerial View of the Brookhaven National Laboratory.

Y P Viyogi has studied projectile fragmentation reactions involving intermediate energy of heavy nuclei at Berkeley. He has been also involved in the study of quark gluon plasma using indigenous photon multiplicity detector (PMD) at CERN in Geneva and Brookhaven National Laboratory in USA. He led Indian group of physicists at the ALICE experiment in CERN. In July 1993, Y P Viyogi published an article on heavy ion collisions having title "Ultra - relativistic heavy ion experiments: a perspective" at Pramana Journal of Physics.

In 2011, he was the leader of Indian physicists in STAR experiment at Relativistic Heavy Ion Collider (RHIC) in Brookhaven National Laboratory, USA. There he was involved in the observation and detection of the antimatter helium-4 nucleus or anti-alpha. He is one of the physicists who witnessed the discovery of the heaviest anti-matter known as anti-alpha particle.

== Literary works ==
Apart from being a physicist, he is also involved in the field of Maithili literature and culture. On 27 June 2014, he was honoured as a Mithila Vibhuti and was awarded the Mithila Vibhuti Vidyapati Award for his contribution to the Maithili literature and culture, by the Gram Vikas Parishad at Ranti. He is an prominent figure in the literary activities in the region. He is many times invited as an important guest in the ceremonies related to the Maithili literature and culture in the region.

In the year 2022, he was invited as the chief guest for a scholarly festival called 'Gyanotsav-2022' at the premises of the Kameshwar Singh Darbhanga Sanskrit University. It was inaugurated by him at the Senate of the Sanskrit university. The scholarly festival was organised to bring together research scholars on one platform in the region.

== See also ==
- Yogeshwar Jha
