= Berkeley Research Reactor =

The Berkeley Research Reactor was an active research nuclear reactor housed in the basement of the Etcheverry Hall in University of California, Berkeley. The reactor became critical on 10 August 1966 and was decommissioned in 1987.

== Description ==
The Berkeley Research Reactor was a TRIGA (Training, Research, Isotope production, General Atomics) Mark III open pool reactor with a steady rated thermal power of 1 MW, capable of being pulsed to 2,000 MW. Professor Lawrence Ruby was the chairman of the Nuclear Engineering Reactor Committee and held key roles in the design and analysis of Etcheverry Hall to support reactor licensing, then served as the first reactor supervisor after it was completed. It first achieved criticality on August 10, 1966, and was used for irradiation of various items, as a teaching tool, and to generate radionuclides.

== Notable events ==
On 16 September 1985, a fuel cladding failure resulted in "unusually high concentrations of radioisotopes [...] in the reactor-room air" following the restart of the reactor after a long maintenance shutdown.

Demonstrations from People's Park in 1982 and 1983 lead to the passage of the Nuclear Free Berkeley act in 1986. After the passing of the Nuclear Free Berkeley Act in 1986 by the city of Berkeley which allows the city to levy fines for nuclear weapons-related activity and to boycott companies involved in the United States nuclear infrastructure. A university physics professor, Charles Schwartz, raised an official charge against the university, questioning whether specific research conducted on the reactor violated the university rules against classified nuclear research as it was done test effects of radiation on components of the Trident II missile. The researches in question were titled "Radiation effect on electronic components" and "electric components testing" and were being done for a group of military contractors such as TRW, Hughes Aircraft, Lockheed and more.
