= N. S. Satya Murthy =

Indian physicist

- Born: Nivarthi Suryanarayanashastry Satya Murthy; 5 February 1936; India
- Died: 8 October 1984 (aged 48)
- Education: University of Bombay
- Known for: Studies on molecular reaction dynamics
- Awards: 1980 Shanti Swarup Bhatnagar Prize
- Scientific career
- Fields: Nuclear physics
- Workplaces: Bhabha Atomic Research Centre

Nivarthi Suryanarayanashastry Satya Murthy (5 February 1936 – 8 October 1984) was an Indian physicist and the head of the Nuclear Physics Division of the Bhabha Atomic Research Centre. Known for his research in molecular reaction dynamics, Murthy was an elected fellow of the Indian National Science Academy, National Academy of Sciences, India and Indian Academy of Sciences. The Council of Scientific and Industrial Research, the apex agency of the Government of India for scientific research, awarded him the Shanti Swarup Bhatnagar Prize for Science and Technology, one of the highest Indian science awards, for his contributions to physical sciences in 1980. (Note: Long link – please select award year to see details)

== Biography ==
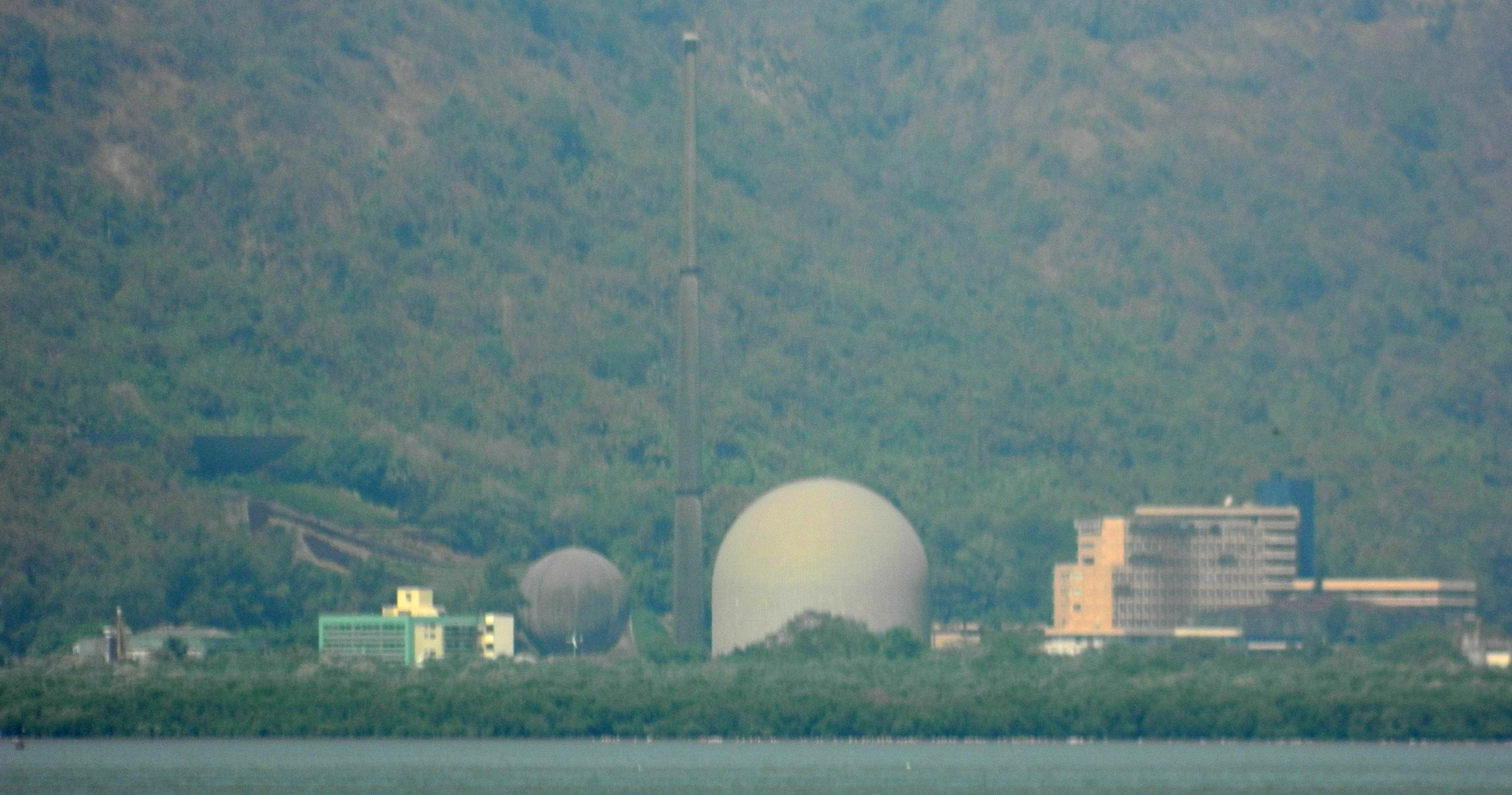
Bhabha Atomic Research Centre

N. S. Satya Murthy, who held a PhD from University of Bombay (1967), served as an assistant director at the Bhabha Atomic Research Centre and as the head of the Nuclear Physics Division of the institution. His research was focused on magnetic materials and his studies of the materials with the help of thermal neutrons have widened the understanding of the subject. Murthy and his team were credited with the discovery of novel magnetic structures and a polarizer for thermal neutrons. His contributions have been reported in the design of neutron facilities of the Dhruva reactor and he led a group of scientists who conceptualized and fabricated several components of the reactor. Murthy also contributed in developing superconducting magnets at BARC and his work assisted in the development of Yafet-Kittel type of ferrimagnetism. His studies have been documented by way of a number of articles (Note: Please see Selected bibliography section) and the article repository of the Indian Academy of Sciences has listed 23 of them. Besides, he published a monograph, Magnetism, along with L. Madhav Rao and his work has been cited by other scientists.

Murthy introduced such experimental techniques as the Compton profile spectroscopy, Mossbauer spectroscopy and Raman spectroscopy at BARC and pioneered basic research on subjects like electron states, of cooperative effects and long wavelength excitations. He contributed to the establishment of the Raja Ramanna Centre for Advanced Technology and was one of the founders of the Magnetics Society of India where he also served as the vice president. Murthy coordinated academic courses on Magnetism and Integrated Circuits for Indian Physics Association and was the general secretary of the organization for two terms from 1973 to 1977. He was also an editorial board member of the Bulletin of Materials Science.

Satya Murthy died on 8 October 1984, at the age of 48.

== Awards and honors ==
The Indian Academy of Sciences elected Murthy as a fellow in 1975. The Council of Scientific and Industrial Research awarded him the Shanti Swarup Bhatnagar Prize, one of the highest Indian science awards in 1979. He became an elected fellow of the Indian National Science Academy in 1981. He was also a life member of the Magnetics Society of India. The Indian Physics Association has instituted an annual award, N. S. Satya Murthy Memorial Award for recognizing research excellence in physical sciences among young scientists.

== Selected bibliography ==
- Madhav Rao, L.; Satya Murthy, N. S.; Venkataraman, G.; Iyengar, P. K. (1968). "Neutron scattering from paramagnetic chromium halides". Physics Letters A. 26 (3): 108–109. Bibcode:1968PhLA...26..108M. doi:10.1016/0375-9601(68)90501-X.
- Youssef, S. I.; Natera, M. G.; Begum, R. J.; Srinivasan, B. S.; Satya Murthy, N. S. (1969). "Polarised neutron diffraction study of nickel ferrite". Journal of Physics and Chemistry of Solids. 30 (8): 1941–1948. Bibcode:1969JPCS...30.1941Y. doi:10.1016/0022-3697(69)90170-X.
- Paranjpe, S. K.; Tendulkar, S. R.; Madhav Rao, L.; Satya Murthy, N. S. (1974). "Non-spherical magnetic moment in MnAlGe". Pramana - Journal of Physics. 3 (6): 355–362. Bibcode:1974Prama...3..355P. doi:10.1007/BF02846630. S2CID 119448541.
- Dharmadurai, G.; Satya Murthy, N. S. (1980). "Self-heating-induced phenomena in long reentrant ferromagnetic thin film superconductors". Physics Letters A. 75 (80): 395–397. Bibcode:1980PhLA...75..395D. doi:10.1016/0375-9601(80)90852-X.
- Satya Murthy, N. S.; Madhav Rao, L. (1984). "Thermal neutron polarisation". Pramana - Journal of Physics. 22 (3–4): 313–328. Bibcode:1984Prama..22..313S. doi:10.1007/BF02846383. S2CID 189882809.

== See also ==
- Magnetic moment
- Neutron scattering
