= Pool-type reactor =

Pool-type reactor can mean:

- A water-cooled Swimming pool reactor
- A Sodium-cooled fast reactor of the pool rather than loop type
