= VECC =

VECC may refer to:

- Variable Energy Cyclotron Centre, a research and development unit of the Indian Department of Atomic Energy
- Netaji Subhas Chandra Bose International Airport (ICAO code: VECC), formerly known as Dum Dum Airport, in Kolkata, India
