= Dhruva reactor =

Radioisotope production reactor

The Dhruva reactor is India's largest nuclear research reactor. It was the first nuclear reactor in Asia proper. Located in the Mumbai suburb of Trombay at the Bhabha Atomic Research Centre (BARC), it is India's primary generator of weapons-grade plutonium-bearing spent fuel for its nuclear weapons program. Originally named the R-5, this open pool reactor first went critical on 8 August 1985 after 10 years of construction. However, the unit did not attain full power until 1988. The reactor experienced at least one serious accident when 4 metric tons (3.9 long tons) of heavy water overflowed from the reactor core in 1985 following vibration problems.

Designed as a larger version of the CIRUS reactor, Dhruva was an Indian designed project built to provide an independent source of weapons-grade plutonium free from safeguards. The Dhruva project cost 950 million rupees. The reactor uses heavy water (deuterium) as a moderator and coolant. Aluminum clad fuel rods containing natural uranium are used to obtain a maximum thermal power output of 100 megawatts. The reactor can produce 20–25 kilograms (44–55 lb) of weapons-grade plutonium per year.

Dhruva, in Indian mythology, is a prince blessed to eternal existence and glory as the Pole Star by Vishnu. It can also mean 'immovable' in Sanskrit.

== See also ==
- N. S. Satya Murthy
- India and weapons of mass destruction
