= India-based Neutrino Observatory =

Indian physics research project

Coordinates: 9°57′20″N 77°17′01″E

India-based Neutrino Observatory (INO) is a particle physics research project under construction to primarily study atmospheric neutrinos in a 1,200 meters (3,900 ft) deep cave under INO Peak near Theni, Tamil Nadu, India. It is planned to provide a precise measurement of neutrino mixing parameters. The project is a multi-institute collaboration and one of the largest experimental particle physics projects undertaken in India.

The project was originally intended to be completed in 2015 at an estimated cost of ₹15,000,000,000 (₹15 billion or US$209.7 million), has been cleared by the Ministry of Environment for construction in the Bodi West Hills Reserved Forest in the Theni district of Tamil Nadu. After delay, the project was underway as of 2015.

When completed, the main magnetised iron calorimeter (ICAL) experiment is planned include the world's largest magnet, four times larger than the 12,500-tonne magnet in the Compact Muon Solenoid detector at CERN in Geneva, Switzerland.

== Iron Calorimeter (ICAL) Detector ==
Chart showing 3 neutrinos and interacting particles, according to the Standard Model of Elementary Particles

The main experiment proposed at INO is the Iron-Calorimeter Detector which aims to probe the Earth matter effects on the propagation of atmospheric neutrinos and to determine neutrino oscillation parameters in the 2-3 oscillation sector. ICAL is planned as a 50000 tonne magnetised detector with iron as the passive detector element and resistive plate chambers (RPCs) as the active detector elements. i.e., the neutrinos will interact with the iron to produce final state particles. The RPCs are expected to detect those final state particles which have charge and record the signals and those which have position and timing information to allow reconstruction of the tracks and/or showers and thus the energy and directions of the final state particles and also the incident neutrino.

The ICAL design is mostly based on the Monolith detector . It is planned that the ICAL detector will have three modules, each module with 151 layers of iron and 150 layers of RPCs, stacked one over the other. The dimension of the entire detector would be 48 m X 16 m X 14.5 m. The detector, owing to its huge size would require around 30000 glass RPCs for the purpose of charged particle detection. ICAL being a neutrino detector must be situated underground to reduce the cosmic ray muon signal.

The distance between INO and CERN is very close to "magic baseline" – a distance at which the effect of the CP phase on the measurement of $\theta_{13}$ is minimal. The major physics advantage of INO ICAL is its ability to measure neutrino mass hierarchy via studying atmospheric neutrinos.

The primary goals of the ICAL are the following:

1. Unambiguous and precise determination of neutrino oscillation parameters using atmospheric neutrinos.
2. Study of matter effects through electric charge identification, that may lead to the determination of the unknown sign of one of the mass differences.
3. Study of charge-conjugation and charge parity (CP) violation in the leptonic sector as well as possible charge-conjugation, parity, time-reversal (CPT) violation studies.
4. Study of Kolar events, possible identification of very-high energy neutrinos and multi-muon events.

Unlike Monolith experiment, ICAL detector will have iron plates of thickness 5.6 centimeters (2.2 in) as passive detectors, with glass RPCs in between as active detectors.

A prototype of the ICAL detector with 14 layers, measuring 1 m × 1 m × 1 m is already operational in the VECC, Kolkata. The 35 ton prototype is set up over ground to track cosmic muons.

In 2008, INO started a graduate training programme leading to PhD degree in high energy physics to provide expert training to students in the areas of detector building and neutrino physics.

A prototype called mini-ICAL, with 1/600 of the weight of ICAL, has been constructed to gain experience in the building of a large-scale electromagnet, to study the detector performance, and to test the ICAL electronics in the presence of fringe magnetic fields. This 4m × 4m × 1.1m detector has 11 iron layers, and 20 RPCs of 1.95m x 1.92m have been inserted in the 10 layers of gaps, in the central region. Mini-ICAL has been in operation since 2018, and is collecting cosmic ray muon data.

== Participating institutes ==
A memorandum of understanding (MoU) spelling out the operational aspects of the project and the mode of utilisation of available funds was signed by seven primary project partners: Tata Institute of Fundamental Research (TIFR), Mumbai, Bhabha Atomic Research Centre (BARC), Mumbai, Institute of Mathematical Sciences (IMSc), Chennai, Saha Institute of Nuclear Physics (SINP), Kolkata, Variable Energy Cyclotron Centre (VECC), Kolkata, Harish Chandra Research Institute (HRI), Allahabad and Institute of Physics (IOP), Bhubaneswar.

Thirteen other project participants include: Aligarh Muslim University, Aligarh, Banaras Hindu University, Varanasi, Calcutta University (CU), Kolkata, Delhi University (DU), Delhi, University of Hawaii (UHW), Hawaii, Himachal Pradesh University (HPU), Shimla, Indian Institute of Technology, Bombay (IITB), Mumbai, Indira Gandhi Centre for Atomic Research (IGCAR), Kalpakkam, North Bengal University (NBU), Siliguri, Panjab University (PU), Chandigarh, Physical Research Laboratory (PRL), Ahmedabad, Sálim Ali Centre for Ornithology and Natural History (SACON), Tamil Nadu and Manipal Institute of Technology, Manipal

== History and recent developments in the project ==
The possibility of a neutrino observatory located in India was discussed as early as 1989 during several meetings held that year. The issue was raised again in the first meeting of the neutrino physics and cosmology working group during the Workshop on High Energy Physics Phenomenology (WHEPP-6) held at Chennai in January 2000 and it was decided then to collate concrete ideas for a neutrino detector.

Further discussions took place in August 2000 during a meeting on Neutrino Physics at the Saha Institute of Nuclear Physics, Kolkata, when a small group of neutrino physics enthusiasts started discussing the possibilities. The Neutrino 2001 meeting was held in the Institute of Mathematical Sciences, Chennai during February 2001 with the explicit objective of bringing the experimentalists and theorists in this field together. The INO collaboration was formed during this meeting. The first formal meeting of the collaboration was held in the Tata Institute of Fundamental Research, Mumbai, during 6 and 7 September 2001 at which various subgroups were formed for studying the detector options and electronics, physics goals and simulations, and site survey.

In 2002, a document was presented to the Department of Atomic Energy, (DAE) which laid out an ambitious goal of establishing an India-based Neutrino Observatory, outlining the physics goals, possible choices for the detector and their physics. Since then many new and fast-paced developments have taken place in neutrino physics. The award of the Nobel Prize in Physics (2002) to the pioneers in neutrino physics is a measure of the importance of this field.

As a result of the support received from various research institutes, universities, the scientific community and the funding agency, the Department of Atomic Energy, a Neutrino Collaboration Group (NCG) was established to study the possibility of building an India-based Neutrino Observatory (INO). The collaboration was assigned the task of doing the feasibility studies for which funds were made available by the DAE. A memorandum of understanding (MoU) was signed by the directors of the participating institutes on August 30, 2002, to enable a smooth functioning of the NCG during the feasibility period. The NCG has the goal of creating an underground neutrino laboratory with the long-term goal of conducting decisive experiments in neutrino physics as also other experiments which require such a unique underground facility.

On 20 November 2009, Ministry of Environment (India) Minister Jairam Ramesh in a letter to Anil Kakodkar, Secretary, Department of Atomic Energy and chairman, Atomic Energy Commission of India, denied permission for the Department of Atomic Energy to set up the India-based Neutrino Observatory (INO) project at Singara in Nilgiris, as it falls in the buffer zone of the Mudumalai Tiger Reserve (MTR). Jairam Ramesh said that based on the report of Rajesh Gopal, Additional Principal Chief Conservator of Forests (PCCF) and Member-Secretary of the National Tiger Conservation Authority (MS-NTCA), the Ministry cannot approve the Singara site. The report says:

"The proposed project site falls in the buffer zone of Mudumalai Tiger Reserve and is in close proximity to the core/critical tiger habitats of Bandipur and Mudumalai Tiger reserves. It is also an elephant corridor, facilitating elephant movement from the Western Ghats to the Eastern Ghats and vice versa. The area is already disturbed on account of severe biotic pressure due to human settlements and resorts and that the construction phase of the project would involve transport of building materials through the highways passing through the core area of the Bandipur and Mudmulai Tiger Reserves.

Instead, he suggested an alternate site near Suruli Falls, Theni District in Tamil Nadu. The Minister said this site did not pose the same problems that Singara posed and environmental and forest clearances should not be a serious issue. He also assured the DAE that the Ministry would facilitate necessary approvals for the alternative location. Dr. Naba K Mondal of the Tata Institute of Fundamental Research, who is the spokesperson for the INO project said:

"But Suruliyar too is in a reserved forest area that is dense and would require cutting down of trees, something that was not required at Singara. Can the government assure us that forest clearance for this site will be given," he asks. "Alternatively, we can move to the nearby Thevaram, which is about 20–30 km away from the Suruliyar falls. This forest area has only shrubs but there is no source of water here and water will have to be piped over a distance of 30 km,"

On 18 October 2010, the Ministry of Environment & Forests approved both environment and forest clearance for setting up the observatory in the Bodi West Hills Reserved Forest in the Theni district of Tamil Nadu.

As of February 2012, the land was allocated to the INO collaboration by the government of Tamil Nadu and the excavation work was about to start. Naba K Mondal, chief spokesperson of INO project and a senior scientist at the Tata Institute of Fundamental Research, Mumbai, told The Hindu that the pre-project work will start in April 2012 and ₹ 66 crores has been sanctioned for the work. The first task will be to have a road connectivity from Rasingapuram to Pottipuram village. The project is expected to be completed in 2015 at an estimated cost of ₹ 1,500 crores.

On 18 September 2012, Kerala's octogenarian Opposition leader and CPI(M) central committee member VS Achuthanandan expressed anxiety over establishing a neutrino observatory on the Theni-Idukki border between Tamil Nadu and Kerala, citing environmental and radiological issues. Soon the INO collaboration clarified on all the issues raised by him and the responses are on the INO website.

On 5 January 2015, Union Cabinet headed by Prime Minister Narendra Modi approved to set up the India-based Neutrino Observatory (INO).

On 20 February 2015, The southern bench of National Green Tribunal ordered notices to the central and state governments on a petition challenging the environmental clearance granted to the India-based Neutrino Observatory (INO) project.

On 26 March 2015, The Madurai bench of the Madras high court restrained the central government from commencing the work on the proposed India-based Neutrino Observatory (INO). The court directed the government to get permission from the Tamil Nadu Pollution Control Board (TNPCB) before commencing the work. On 19 March 2018, Ministry of Environment (India) overturned the NGT.

Throughout this process, villagers in the Pottipuram Panchayat have been agitating against the proposed observatory under the banner of Poovulagin Nanbargal (Friends of the earth). A spokesman for the organization expressed concern over the lakhs of tons of rock that would be blasted inside the mountain to create the observatory, which had the potential for groundquakes. In addition he expressed concerns against potential radiation from the project and general harm to the ecosystem. In January 2020 villagers in Pottipuram passed a resolution against building the INO in their area, citing the potential for ecological damage to Western Ghats.

As of July 2021, the INO project's construction has not started and the project is described as "stalled". The plans for the facility and experimental apparatus have been made, and a site for the realization of the project has been chosen, and a budget has been proposed, but getting permission to start actual building at the chosen site in Pottipuram village in Tamil Nadu state has not succeeded, with opposition from the local villagers, government officials and most notably, environmentalists and government environment agencies; the environment agencies' approval is needed for the construction to start. Indeed, on June 17, 2021, Tamil Nadu chief minister M.K. Stalin met Prime Minister Narendra Modi and suggested the INO project be shelved or shifted elsewhere. Stalin's suggestion was based on the advice of the State (of Tamil Nadu) Forest and Environment Department. There is no knowledge of when construction might start, or if indeed the project is to be realised at all. The project organization, that is, INO collaboration, however continues to pursue the INO project. The INO scientists, along with other eminent scientists, wrote a response to Mr. Stalin, arguing for the construction of INO as early as possible.

In 2022, the state of Tamil Nadu government filed an affidavit in the Supreme Court of India asking that the Union government (i.e. India's national government) call the INO off. Also, it was suggested by some that INO started to suffer a lack of purpose as other neutrino experiments (some that had been realized and some that were still under development or planning) started to leave it behind in terms of potential for discovery. The proponents of the INO project, including the Union government, filed their own arguments supporting INO to the Supreme Court of India and as of 2022, the arguing between the supporters and the opponents of INO continues in the Supreme Court, and no construction at the site has taken place.
