= Ravi Grover =

Indian nuclear scientist and engineer

Ravi B. Grover
- Born: 17 February 1949 (age 77); Punjab, India
- Education: Delhi College of Engineering, Indian Institute of Science
- Known for: Indian Nuclear Program and establishing the Homi Bhabha National Institute
- Scientific career
- Fields: Mechanical Engineering, Nuclear Engineering
- Workplaces: Bhabha Atomic Research Centre; Department of Atomic Energy; Homi Bhabha National Institute

Ravi B. Grover is an Indian nuclear scientist and a mechanical engineer. He is the founding director of the Homi Bhabha National Institute, a member of the Atomic Energy Commission, chairman of the Board of Research in Nuclear Sciences, a fellow of the Indian National Academy of Engineering, and World Academy of Art and Science. He was the president of the Indian Society of Heat and Mass Transfer for the period 2010–2013. He is currently a Distinguished Professor Emeritus at the Homi Bhabha National Institute. He was awarded the Padma Shri by the Government of India in 2014.

He retired from his previous position as Principal Adviser, Strategic Planning Group, Department of Atomic Energy (DAE), in February 2013. Following retirement, he was appointed to DAE's Homi Bhabha Chair for a period of five years. Subsequently, he was emeritus professor at the Homi Bhabha National Institute for six years. Concurrently with his position in the DAE, he developed and led the Homi Bhabha National Institute from 2005 to 2016. He represented BARC training school in the World Nuclear University in 2003.

== Education and career ==
Ravi B. Grover completed his bachelor's degree in mechanical engineering from Delhi College of Engineering in 1970 and joined the staff of Bhabha Atomic Research Centre. He completed a PhD in mechanical engineering from the Indian Institute of Science, Bangalore in 1982.

He was awarded Dhirubhai Ambani Oration Award by Indian Institute of Chemical Engineers in 2008, Distinguished Alumnus Award by Delhi College of Engineering Alumni Association in 2009, Distinguished Alumnus Award by Indian Institute of Science and Indian Institute of Science Alumni Association in 2011. In 2016, Delhi College of Engineering Alumni Association bestowed him with a Lifetime Achievement Award.

During the first 25 years of his career, Dr. Grover worked as a nuclear engineer and specialized in thermal hydraulics. He worked on fluid to fluid modeling techniques for two-phase flows, reactor fuel and core thermal hydraulics, safety analysis, and process design of reactor systems and equipment. Post-1996, he took up managerial responsibilities including technology transfer, human resource development, and extramural funding.

On 15 January 2013, the Prime Minister of India conferred on him the Lifetime Achievement Award for the year 2011 for his outstanding contributions in the field of nuclear engineering, towards the national initiative to open international civil nuclear trade, further development of the framework for the governance of nuclear power and human resource development. The citation for the award stated, "During a career spanning four decades, Dr. Grover has distinguished himself as an academic, research and development engineer and a science administrator. His knowledge of nuclear engineering and nuclear law has earned him the title 'nuclear diplomat'." Citation says, " He played maximum role in all steps taken by the Government of India towards opening international civil nuclear trade." Citation also acknowledges his role during negotiations in 2005 aimed at India joining ITER and he led the Indian delegation to ITER Council since its inception until March 2025.

In 2014, he was conferred India's fourth-highest civilian award, the Padma Shri. In 2016, the Delhi College of Engineering Alumni Association presented him with a lifetime achievement award for his continued high-level involvement in professional activities.

== Support for Peaceful Use of Nuclear Energy ==
Ravi Grover is well known in India as a proponent of nuclear energy as can be seen from his publications related to nuclear energy. He is an editor of the International Journal of Nuclear Knowledge Management.

Dr. Grover along with his colleagues formulated a scenario for the growth of electricity demand in India by taking into consideration economic growth, population growth, and improvement in energy intensity of GDP and formulating a possible supply mix considering India's fuel resource base to delineate niche area for nuclear energy. This was the first such long-term forecast of electricity demand in India and firmly established the role of nuclear energy in India's electricity mix. He has been writing in media about issues related to India's electricity needs and has been highlighting the importance of nuclear energy. He firmly believes that only a diverse energy mix comprising all low-carbon technologies, that is hydro, nuclear, solar, and wind, should be exploited and provided with a level playing field.

== Role in the Indo-US nuclear negotiations ==
Ravi Grover is one half of the Kakodkar-Grover duo who are chiefly responsible for the success of the Indo-US negotiations that culminated in the 123 agreement signed in July 2007. Anil Kakodkar and Ravi Grover were the technical advisors to India's politicians in the tense negotiations that led to the Indo-US nuclear agreement, a culmination of two years of painstaking negotiations.

Quoted from Frontline magazine, Volume 24 – Issue 16 :: 11–24 Aug. 2007:

Officials of the DAE called it “a fantastic team effort” and complimented the crucial, but low-key, role of Ravi B. Grover, Director of the DAE’s Strategic Planning Group. According to the DAE, Grover, who is also Director of the Knowledge Management Group of BARC, stood like a rock against the onslaught of American demands. While the core negotiating team comprised officials of the Ministry of External Affairs (MEA), India’s High Commissioner to Singapore S. Jaishankar, Joint Secretary (Americas) Gayatri Kumar and Grover, National Security Adviser M.K. Narayanan and Foreign Secretary Shivshankar Menon stepped into the picture when the negotiations reached a decisive stage. In the final round in Washington in July, AEC chairman and DAE Secretary Anil Kakodkar was available for consultations, although he did not participate directly in the negotiations.

Shivshankar Menon has described nuclear scientist Ravi Grover and the diplomat S Jaishankar as "the sources of ideas and details" for the civil nuclear initiative with the United States. Ravi Grover has written in detail about the initiative to open civil nuclear cooperation.

== Homi Bhabha National Institute ==
Homi Bhabha National Institute (HBNI) was accredited as a deemed to be university in 2005 and Ravi Grover was its first director. He was head of HBNI from 2005 until February 2016 and has brought it to the stage of one of the leading research universities in India.

== See also ==
- Bhabha Atomic Research Center
- Homi Bhabha National Institute

== Publications ==
- R B Grover, "Strategy followed by India in providing trained manpower for nuclear industry," Opening Keynote, International Conference for Knowledge Management in Nuclear Facilities, June 2007, Vienna, Austria
- R B Grover, "Development of Nuclear Energy Programme and the Role of Government and International Organisations," Special Symposium for the IAEA 50th Anniversary – Global Challenges for the Future of Nuclear Energy and the IAEA, April 2007, Aomori, Japan
- R B Grover, "Can Nuclear Energy be a Response to Energy and Climate in India," Energy and Climate Special Event, January 2007, New Delhi, India
- R B Grover, "Role of nuclear energy in India's energy mix," IANCS bulletin, p. 129, April 2006
- Anil Kakodkar and R B Grover, "Nuclear Energy in India," The Nuclear Engineer, Volume 45, No2, page 31–36, March/April 2004.
- R B Grover, "Indian experience in capacity building as a part of development of atomic energy programme," IAEA-CN-123/K2, 2004
- R B GROVER, "Technology and Knowledge Management in and by the Department of Atomic Energy, India," Int Conf on 50 years of Nuclear Power: the Next 50 Years, organised by the International Atomic Energy Agency, Obninsk, Russia, 27 June – 2 July 2004.
- R B GROVER and Subhash Chandra, "Scenario for the Growth of Electrical Energy in India," Energy Policy, 34, 2006, pp 2834–2847.
- R B Grover, "Nuclear Power and Sustainable Development – a Perspective," IAEA Side Event at CSD-9, UN Secretariat Building, New York, 19 April 2001
- A K Nema, B K Pathak and R B Grover, "India – Nuclear Power for GHG Mitigation and Sustainable Energy Development," Nuclear Power for Greenhouse Gas Mitigation, International Atomic Energy Agency, November 2000.
- R B Grover, "Nuclear Energy: Emerging Trends," CURRENT SCIENCE, Vol 78, No 10, 25 May 2000
- R B Grover, "Prospects for Nuclear Energy in South Asia in the 21st Century," Int. J of Global Energy Issues, Vol. 30, No. 1/2/3/4 2008, pp228 – 248
- R B Grover, "Nuclear Energy and India," Atoms for Peace: An International Journal, Vol. 2, No. 1, 2008, pp 68 – 82.
- R B Grover, "Policy Initiatives by the Government of India to Accelerate the Growth of Installed Nuclear Power Capacity in the Coming Years," Energy Procedia 7 (2011) 74–78.
- R B Grover, "Role of Nuclear Power for Green Growth: a Perspective from India," Energy Strategies Reviews 1 (2013) 255–260.
- Suresh Gangotra, R B Grover and K L Ramakumar, "Comparison for thorium fuel cycle facilities of two different capacities for implementation of safeguards", Nuclear Engineering and Design, 262(2013) 535–543.
- R B Grover and R R Puri, "Development of Human Resources for Indian Nuclear Power Programme", Sadhana, Vol. 38, Part 5, October 2013, pp 1051–1064.
- R B Grover, "Technological dimension of nuclear security", Strategic Analysis, 2014, vol 38, No. 2, 151–156.
- R B Grover, "Nuclear Power for India’s Energy Security: External and Internal Challenges", India's National Security: Annual Review 2013, Routledge India, ISBN 978-1-13-879638-6.
- Suresh Gangotra, R B Grover and K L Ramakumar, "Analysis of Measures to Enhance Safeguards, and Proliferation Resistance in Thorium based fuel Fabrication Plants", Progress in Nuclear Energy, 77 (2014), 20–31.
- R B Grover, "Opening up of international civil nuclear cooperation with India and related development", Progress in Nuclear Energy 101 (2017) 161–167.
- R B Grover, "The Civil Liability for Nuclear Damage Act of India: An engineering perspective regarding Supplier's liability", Progress in Nuclear Energy 101, 168–175.
