= Bhabha Atomic Research Centre =

Nuclear research facility in Mumbai, India

- भाभा परमाणु अनुसंधान केंद्र
- Abbreviation: BARC
- Formation: January 3, 1954; 72 years ago
- Founder: Homi J. Bhabha
- Headquarters: Trombay, Mumbai
- Locations: Mumbai, India; Kalpakkam; Challakere
- Coordinates: 19.017°N 72.925°E
- Fields: Nuclear research; Nuclear fuel cycle; Nuclear reactor technology; Nuclear chemistry; Environmental and Radiation Monitoring; Nuclear medicine; Materials science and engineering; Instrumentation and control engineering; National security; Nuclear weapons
- Director: Vivek Bhasin
- Parent organisation: Department of Atomic Energy
- Budget: ₹4,886.6 crore (US$510 million) (2026–27)
- Website: barc.gov.in
- Formerly called: Atomic Energy Establishment, bombay

The Bhabha Atomic Research Centre (BARC) is India's premier nuclear research facility, headquartered in Trombay, Mumbai, Maharashtra. It was founded by Homi J. Bhabha as the Atomic Energy Establishment, Trombay (AEET) in January 1954 as a multidisciplinary research program essential for India's nuclear program.

It operates under the Department of Atomic Energy, which is directly overseen by the Prime Minister of India.

BARC is a multi-disciplinary research centre with extensive infrastructure for advanced research and development covering the entire spectrum of Nuclear physics, chemical engineering, Materials science and metallurgy, Instrumentation, Biology and Medicine, Supercomputer, Particle physics and Plasma (physics) and associated research for Indian nuclear programme and related areas.

BARC's core mandate is to sustain peaceful applications of nuclear energy. It manages all facets of nuclear power generation, from the theoretical design of reactors to, computer modeling and simulation, risk analysis, development and testing of new reactor fuel, materials, etc. It also researches spent fuel processing and safe disposal of nuclear waste. Its other research focus areas are applications for isotopes in industries, radiation technologies and their application to health, food and medicine, agriculture and environment, accelerator and laser technology, electronics, instrumentation and reactor control and material science, environment and radiation monitoring etc. BARC operates a number of research reactors across the country.

Its primary facilities are located in Trombay, with new facilities also located in Challakere in Chitradurga district of Karnataka. A new Special Mineral Enrichment Facility which focuses on enrichment of uranium fuel is under construction in Atchutapuram near Visakhapatnam in Andhra Pradesh, for supporting India's nuclear submarine program and produce high specific activity radioisotopes for extensive research.

== History ==
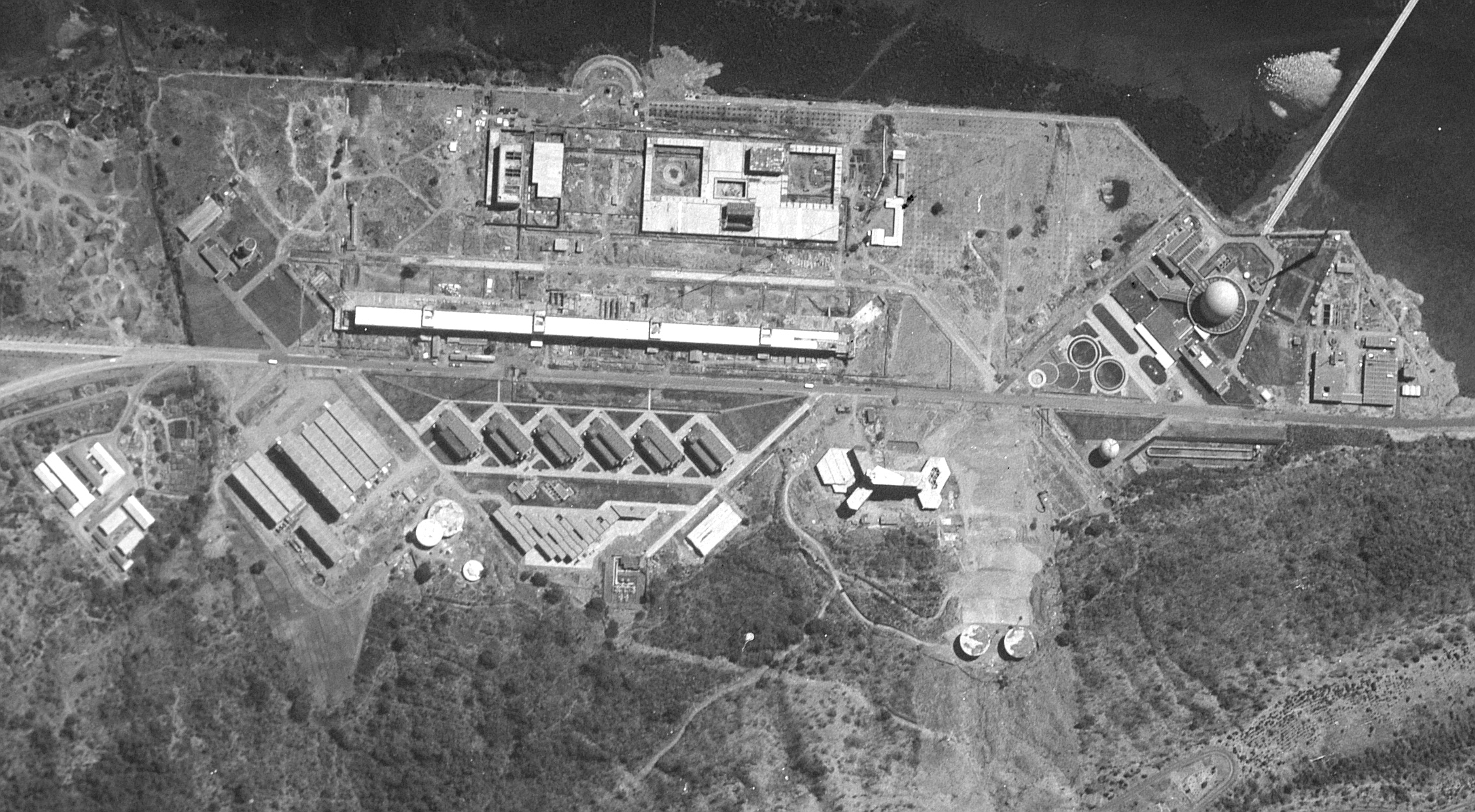
India's first reactor and a plutonium reprocessing facility, Mumbai, as photographed by a US satellite on 19 February 1966

When Homi J. Bhabha was working at the Indian Institute of Science, there was no institute in India which had the necessary facilities for original work in nuclear physics, Cosmic ray, Particle physics, and other frontiers of knowledge in physics. This prompted him to send a proposal in March 1944 to the Sir Dorabji Tata Trust for establishing "a vigorous school of research in fundamental physics".

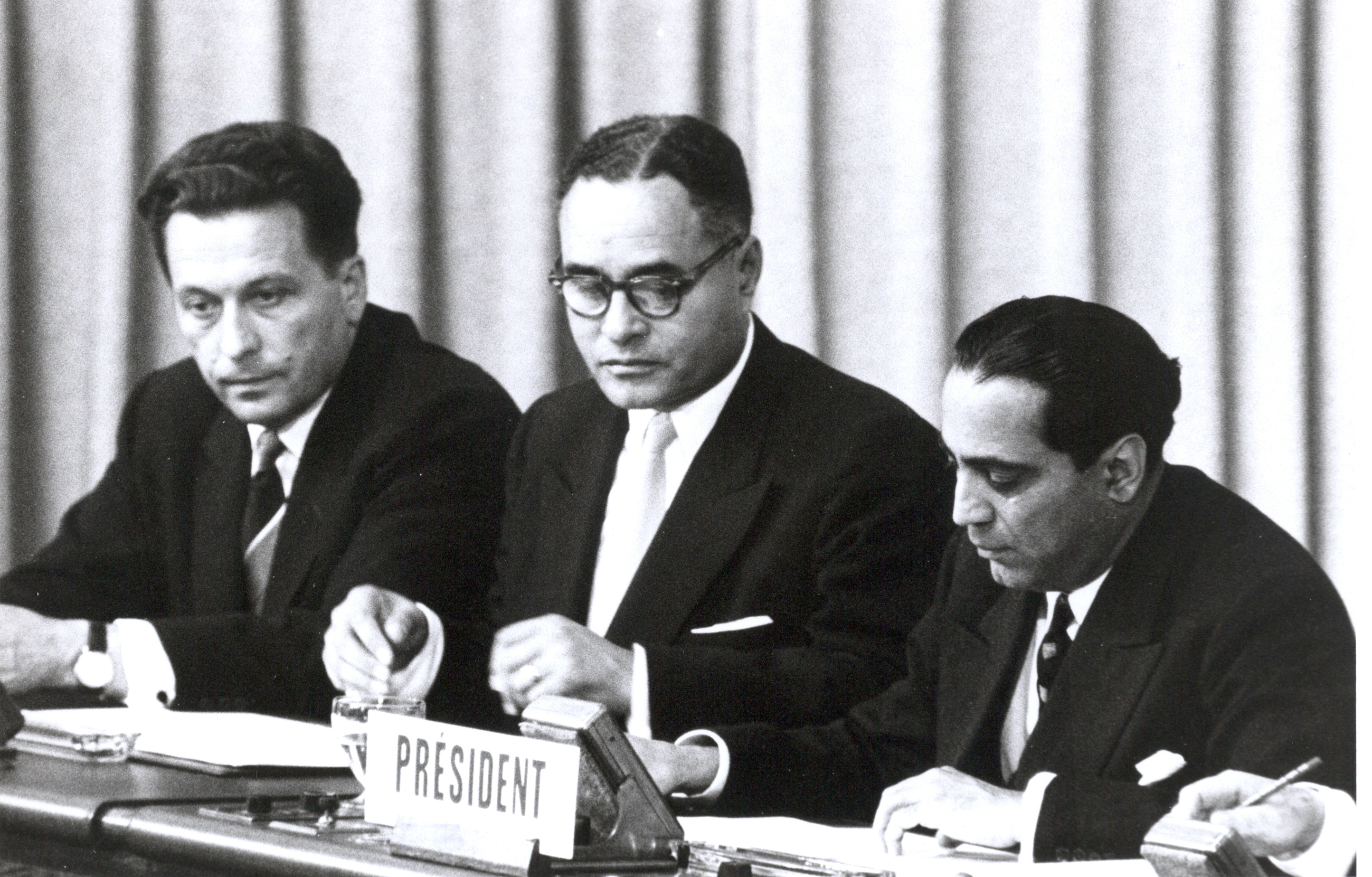
Bhabha (right) at the International Conference on the Peaceful Uses of Atomic Energy in Geneva, Switzerland, 20 August 1955

When Bhabha realised that technology development for the atomic energy programme could no longer be carried out within TIFR he proposed to the government to build a new laboratory entirely devoted to this purpose. For this purpose, 1200 acres of land was acquired at Trombay from the Bombay Government. Thus the Atomic Energy Establishment Trombay (AEET) started functioning in 1954. The same year the Department of Atomic Energy (DAE) was also established.

Bhabha established the BARC Training School to cater to the manpower needs of the expanding atomic energy research and development program. Bhabha emphasized self-reliance in all fields of nuclear science and engineering.

The Government of India created the Atomic Energy Establishment, Trombay (AEET) with Bhabha as the founding director on 3 January 1954. It was established to consolidate all the research and development activities for nuclear reactors and technology under the Atomic Energy Commission. All scientists and engineers engaged in the fields of reactor designing and development, instrumentation, metallurgy, and material science, etc., were transferred with their respective programs from the Tata Institute of Fundamental Research (TIFR) to AEET, with TIFR retaining its original focus for fundamental research in the sciences. After Bhabha's death in 1966, the centre was renamed as the Bhabha Atomic Research Centre on 22 January 1967.

The first reactors at BARC and its affiliated power generation centres were imported from the west. India's first power reactors, installed at the Tarapur Atomic Power Station were from the United States.

The primary importance of BARC is as a research centre. The BARC and the Indian government has consistently maintained that the reactors are used for this purpose only: Apsara (1956; named by the then Prime Minister of India, Jawaharlal Nehru when he likened the blue Cherenkov radiation to the beauty of the Apsaras), CIRUS reactor (1960; the "Canada-India Reactor" with assistance from the US), the now-defunct ZERLINA (1961; Zero Energy Reactor for Lattice Investigations and Neutron Assay), Purnima I (1972), Purnima II (1984), Dhruva (1985), Purnima III (1990), and KAMINI.

Apsara was India's first nuclear reactor built at BARC in 1956 to conduct basic research in nuclear physics. It is 1 MWTh light water cooled and moderated swimming pool type thermal reactor that went critical on August 4, 1956, and is suitable for production of isotopes, basic nuclear research, shielding experiments, neutron activation analysis, neutron radiography and testing of neutron detectors. It was shut down permanently in 2010 and replaced with Apsara-U. Purnima-I is a plutonium oxide fuelled 1 MWTh pulsed-fast reactor that was built starting in 1970 and went critical on 18 May 1972 to primarily support the validation of design parameters for development of plutonium-239 powered nuclear weapons.

On the twentieth anniversary of the 1974 Pokhran nuclear test, Purnima's designer, P. K. Iyengar, reflected on the reactor's critical role: "Purnima was a novel device, built with about 20 kg of plutonium, a variable geometry of reflectors, and a unique control system. This gave considerable experience and helped to benchmark calculations regarding the behaviour of a chain-reacting system made out of plutonium. The kinetic behaviour of the system just above critical could be well studied. Very clever physicists could then calculate the time behaviour of the core of a bomb on isotropic compression. What the critical parameters would be, how to achieve optimum explosive power, and its dependence on the first self sustaining neutron trigger, were all investigated". It was decommissioned in 1973.

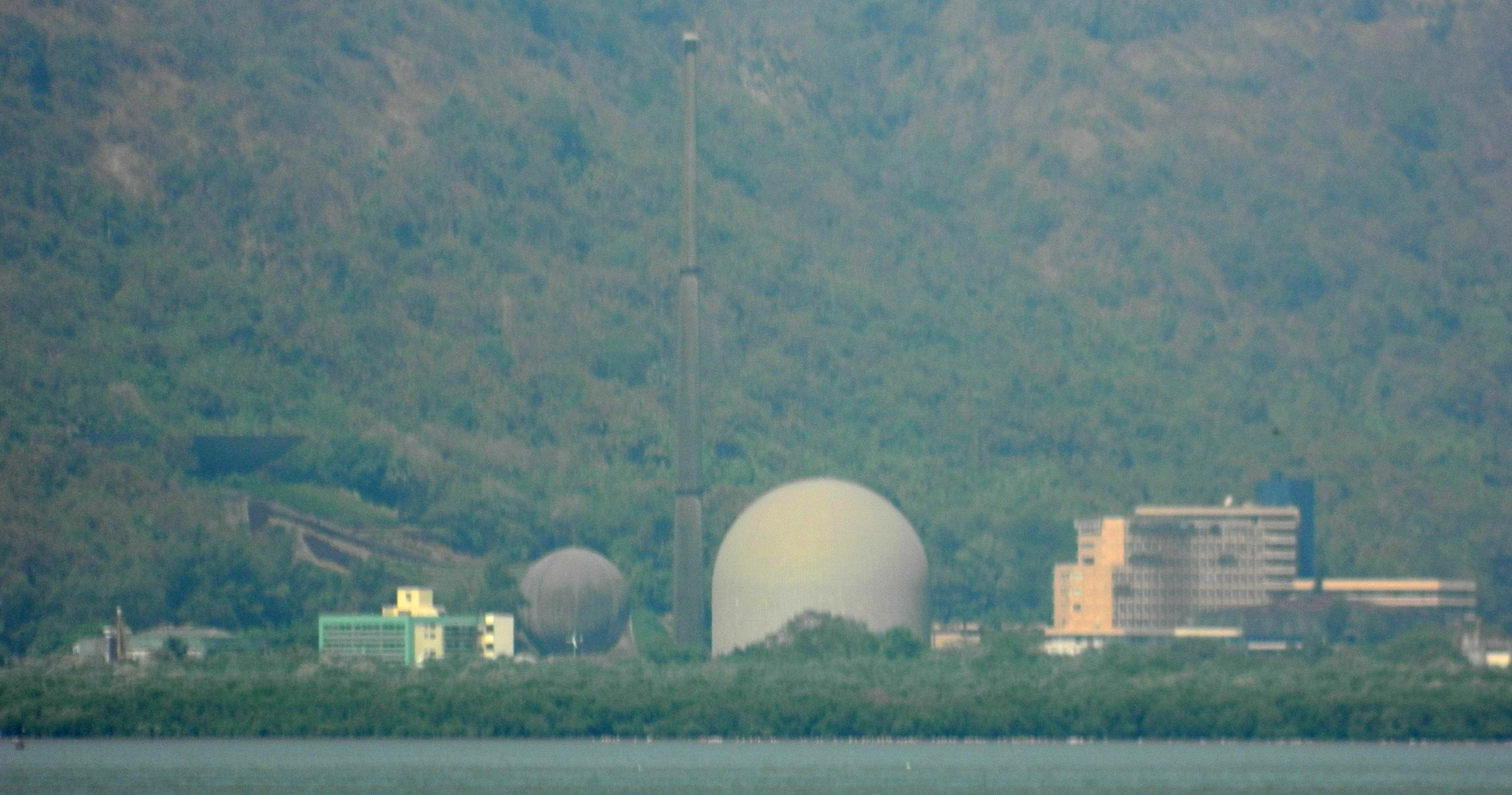
Digitally altered image of BARC (view from seaside)

Along with DRDO and other agencies and laboratories BARC also played an essential and important role in nuclear weapons technology and research. The plutonium used in India's 1974 Smiling Buddha nuclear test came from CIRUS. In 1974 the head of this entire nuclear bomb project was the director of the BARC, Raja Ramanna. The neutron initiator was of the polonium–beryllium type and code-named Flower was developed by BARC. The entire nuclear bomb was engineered and finally assembled by Indian engineers at Trombay before transportation to the test site. The 1974 test (and the 1998 tests that followed) gave Indian scientists the technological know-how and confidence not only to develop nuclear fuel for future reactors to be used in power generation and research but also the capacity to refine the same fuel into weapons-grade fuel to be used in the development of nuclear weapons.

BARC was also involved in the Pokhran-II series of five nuclear test conducted at Pokhran Test Range in May 1998. It was the second instance of nuclear testing conducted after Smiling Buddha by India. The tests achieved their main objective of giving India the capability to build fission and thermonuclear weapons(Hydrogen bomb/fusion bomb) with yields up to 200 Kilotons. The then Chairman of the Atomic Energy Commission of India described each one of the explosions of Pokhran-II to be "equivalent to several tests carried out by other nuclear weapon states over decades". Subsequently, India established computer simulation capability to predict the yields of nuclear explosives whose designs are related to the designs of explosives used in this test. The scientists and engineers of the BARC, the Atomic Minerals Directorate for Exploration and Research (AMDER), and the Defence Research and Development Organisation (DRDO) were involved in the nuclear weapon assembly, layout, detonation and data collection.

On 3 June 1998 BARC was hacked by hacktivist group milw0rm, consisting of hackers from the United States, United Kingdom and New Zealand. They downloaded classified information, defaced the website and deleted data from servers.

BARC also designed a class of Indian Pressurized Heavy Water Reactor IPHWR (Indian Pressurized Heavy Water Reactor), the baseline 220 MWe design was developed from the Canadian CANDU reactor. The design was later expanded into 540 MW and 700 MW designs.

The IPHWR-220 (Indian Pressurized Heavy Water Reactor-220) was the first in class series of Indian pressurized heavy-water reactor designed by the Bhabha Atomic Research Centre. It is a Generation II reactor developed from earlier CANDU based RAPS-1 and RAPS-2 reactors built at Rawatbhata, Rajasthan. Currently there are 14 units operational at various locations in India. Upon completion of the design of IPHWR-220, a larger 540 MWe design was started around 1984 under the aegis of BARC in partnership with NPCIL. Two reactors of this design were built in Tarapur, Maharashtra starting in the year 2000 and the first was commissioned on 12 September 2005. The IPHWR-540 design was later upgraded to a 700 MWe with the main objective to improve fuel efficiency and develop a standardized design to be installed at many locations across India as a fleet-mode effort. The design was also upgraded to incorporate Generation III+ features. Almost 100% of the parts of these indigenously designed reactors are manufactured by Indian industry.

BARC designed and built India's first pressurized water reactor at Kalpakkam, a 80MW land based prototype of INS Arihant's nuclear power unit, as well as the Arihant's main propulsion reactor. Three other submarine vessels of the class (Arihant class) including the upcoming INS arighat, S4 and S4* will also get the same class of reactors as there primary propulsion.

BARC also developed stabilization systems for Seekers, Antenna Units for India's multirole fighter HAL Tejas and contributed to Chandrayaan-1 and Mars Orbiter Mission missions. BARC has contributed for collaboration with various mega science projects of National and International repute viz. CERN (LHC), India-based Neutrino Observatory (INO), ITER, Low Energy High Intensity Proton Accelerator (LEHIPA), Facility for Antiproton and Ion Research (FAIR), Major Atmospheric Cerenkov Experiment Telescope (MACE), etc.

In 2012 it was reported that new facilities and campuses of BARC were planned in Atchutapuram, near Visakhapatnam in Andhra Pradesh, and in Challakere in Chitradurga district in Karnataka. BARC would be setting 30 MW special research reactor using an enriched uranium fuel at Visakhapatnam to meet the demand for high specific activity radio isotopes and carry out extensive research and development in nuclear sector. The site would also support the nuclear submarine program.

== Description ==
BARC is a multi-disciplinary research centre with extensive infrastructure for advanced research and development covering the entire spectrum of nuclear science, chemical engineering, material sciences and metallurgy, electronic instrumentation, biology and medicine, supercomputing, high-energy physics and plasma physics and associated research for Indian nuclear programme and related areas.

BARC is a premier nuclear and multi-disciplinary research organization though founded primarily to serve India's nuclear program and its peaceful applications of nuclear energy does research and development covering nuclear science, chemical engineering, radiology and their application to health, food, medicine, agriculture and environment, accelerator and laser technology, electronics, high performance computing, instrumentation and reactor control, materials science and radiation monitoring, high-energy physics and plasma physics among others.

== Organisation and governance ==
BARC is an agency of the Department of Atomic Energy. It is divided into a number of Groups, each under a director, and many more Divisions.

=== Nuclear Recycle Board ===
BARC's Nuclear Recycle Board (NRB) was formed in 2009. It is located in three cities – Mumbai, Tarapur, and Kalpakkam.

== Areas of research ==
BARC conducts extensive and advanced research and development covering the entire spectrum of nuclear science, chemical engineering, material sciences and metallurgy, electronics instrumentation, biology and medicine, advance computing, high-energy plasma physics and associated research for Indian nuclear program and related areas. The few are:

=== Thorium fuel cycle ===
India has a unique position in the world, in terms of availability of nuclear fuel resource. It has a limited resource of uranium but a large resource of thorium. The beach sands of Kerala and Orissa have rich reserves of monazite, which contains about 8–10% thorium.

Studies have been carried out on all aspects of thorium fuel cycle - mining and extraction, fuel fabrication, utilisation in different reactor systems, evaluation of its various properties and irradiation behaviour, reprocessing and recycling. Some of the important milestones achieved / technological progress made in these are as follows:

The process of producing thoria from monazite is well established. IREL has produced several tonnes of nuclear grade thoria powder The fabrication of thoria based fuel by powder-pellet method is well established. Few tonnes of thoria fuel have been fabricated at BARC and NFC for various irradiations in research and power reactors. Studies have been carried out regarding use of thorium in different types of reactors with respect to fuel management, reactor control and fuel utilisation. A Critical Facility has been constructed and is being used for carrying out experiments with thoria based fuels. Thoria based fuel irradiations have been carried out in our research and power reactors. Thoria fuel rods in the reflector region of research reactor CIRUS. Thoria fuel assemblies as reactivity load in research reactor Dhruva. Thoria fuel bundles for flux flattening in the Initial Core of PHWRs. Thoria blanket assemblies in FBTR. (Th-Pu)MOX fuel pins of BWR, PHWR and AHWR design in research reactors CIRUS and Dhruva.

Post-irradiation examinations have been carried out on the irradiated PHWR thoria fuel bundles and (Th-Pu) MOX fuel pins. Thermo-physical and thermodynamic properties have been evaluated for the thoria based fuels. Thoria fuel rods irradiated in CIRUS have been reprocessed at Uranium Thorium Separation Facility (UTSF) BARC. The recovered 233U has been fabricated as fuel for KAMINI reactor. Thoria blanket assemblies irradiated in FBTR have been reprocessed at IGCAR. The recovered 233U has been used for experimental irradiation of PFBR type fuel assembly in FBTR. Thoria fuel bundles irradiated in PHWRs will be reprocessed in Power Reactor Thorium Reprocessing Facility (PRTRF). The recovered 233U will be used for reactor physics experiments in AHWR-Critical Facility.

Advanced reactors AHWR and AHWR300-LEU have been designed at BARC to provide impetus to the large-scale utilisation of thorium.

=== Reprocessing and nuclear waste management ===
After certain energy utilization, known as burn-up (a legacy of thermal power) is reached, nuclear fuel in a reactor is replaced by fresh fuel so that fission chain reactions can sustain and desired power output can be maintained. The spent fuel discharged from the reactor is known as spent nuclear fuel (SNF). BARC has come a long way since it first began reprocessing of spent fuel in the year 1964 at Trombay. India has more than five decades of experience for reprocessing of spent fuel of Uranium based first stage reactor resulting in development of well matured and highly evolved PUREX based reprocessing flow sheet involving recovery of SNM.

Implementation of thorium fuel cycle requires extraction of 233U from irradiated thorium fuel and its re-insertion into the fuel cycle. Based on indigenous efforts, a flow sheet for reprocessing of spent thoria rods was developed and demonstrated at Uranium Thorium Separation Facility (UTSF), Trombay. After gaining successful experience at UTSF, Power Reactor Thoria Reprocessing Facility (PRTRF) has been set up employing advanced laser based technology for dismantling of thoria bundle and single pin mechanical chopper for cutting of fuel pins. Thoria irradiated fuel bundles from PHWR were reprocessed using TBP as extractant to recover 233U.

High Level Liquid Waste (HLLW) generated during reprocessing of spent fuel contains most of the radioactivity generated in entire nuclear fuel cycle. The HLLW is immobilised into an inert Sodium Boro-Silicate glass matrix through a process, called vitrification. The vitrified waste is stored for an interim period in an air cooled vault to facilitate the dissipation of heat generated during radioactive decay. Prior to its eventual disposal in geological disposal facility. Vitrification of HLLW is a complex process and poses challenges in view of high temperature operations in presence of high amount of radioactivity. As a result, very few countries in world could master the technology of vitrification of HLLW and India is among them. Three melter technologies, Induction Heated Metallic Melter (IHMM), Joule Heated Ceramic Melter (JHCM) and Cold Crucible Induction Melter (CCIM), have been indigenously developed for vitrification of HLLW. HLLW vitrification plants, based on IHMM or JHCM technologies, have been constructed and successfully operated at Trombay, Tarapur and Kalpakkam sites of India.

Vitrification Cell (IHMM), WIP, Trombay Joule Heated Ceramic Melter, Tarapur Inside view of Cold Crucible Induction Melter R&D in the field of partitioning of Minor Actinides from HLLW are also aimed to separate out the long-lived radioactive waste constituents prior to immobilizing then in glass matrice. The long lived radio-contaminants is planned to be burnt in Fast reactor or Accelerator Driven Sub Critical systems to get converted into short- lived species. This will reduce the need of long term isolation of radionuclide from environment by multifold. R&D is also directed towards management of Hulls, contaminated left over pieces of zirconium clad tube after dissolution of fuel, and Geological Disposal Facility for safe disposal of vitrified HLLW and long lived waste with objective to long term isolation of radionuclide from the human environment.

==== Advanced Fuel Fabrication Facility ====
The Advanced Fuel Fabrication Facility (AFFF), a MOX fuel fabrication facility, is part of the Nuclear Recycle Board (NRB), and located at the Tarapur, Maharashtra. Advanced Fuel Fabrication Facility has fabricated MOX fuels on experimental basis for BWR, PHWR, FBTR and research reactors. It makes plutonium-based MOX fuel for the stage 2 of Indian Nuclear Program. The unit has successfully fabricated more than 1 lakh PFBR fuel elements for the Kalpakam based Bhavini's PFBR. AFFF is presently engaged in the fabrication of PFBR fuel elements for reloads of PFBR.

AFFF also is involved in AHWR(Thorium MOX Fuel) MOX fuel fabrication for the third stage of Indian nuclear program and is experimenting with different fabrication techniques. |

MOX fuel fabrication at AFFF follows Powder Oxide Pelletisation (POP) Method. Major operations are mixing and milling, pre-compaction, granulation, Final compaction, Sintering, centreless grinding, degassing, endplug welding, decontamination of fuel elements and wire wrapping. AFFF also does the recycling of the rejects based on either thermal pulverisation or microwave based oxidation and reduction. AFFF uses Laser welding for encapsulation of fuel elements along with GTAW.

=== Basic and applied physics ===
The interdisciplinary research includes investigation of matter under different physicochemical environments, including temperature, magnetic field and pressure. Reactors, ion and electron accelerators and lasers are being employed as tools to investigate crucial phenomena in materials over wide length and time scales. Major facilities, operated by BARC for research in Physical sciences, include the Pelletron-Superconducting linear accelerator at TIFR, the National Facility for Neutron Beam Research (NFNBR) at Dhruva, a number of state-of-the-art beam lines at INDUS synchrotron, RRCAT-Indore, the TeV Atmospheric Cherenkov Telescope with Imaging Camera (TACTIC) at Mt. Abu, the Folded Tandem Ion Accelerator (FOTIA) and PURNIMA fast neutron facilities at BARC, the 3 MV Tandetron accelerator at the National Centre for Compositional Characterization of Materials (NCCCM) at Hyderabad, the 10 MeV electron accelerator at the Electron Beam Centre at Navi Mumbai.

BARC also has sustained programs of indigenous development of detectors, sensors, mass spectrometer, imaging technique and multilayer-mirrors. Recent achievements include: commissioning of the Major Atmospheric Cerenkov Experiment Telescope (MACE) at Ladakh, a time-of-flight neutron spectrometer at Dhruva, the beam-lines at INDUS (Small-and wide angle X-ray Scattering (SWAXS), protein crystallography, Infrared spectroscopy, Extended X-ray absorption fine structure (EXAFS), Photoelectron spectroscopy (PES/ PEEM), Energy and angle-dispersive XRD, and imaging), commissioning of beam-lines and associated detector facilities at BARC-TIFR Pelletron facility, the Low Energy High Intensity Proton Accelerator (LEHIPA) at BARC, the Digital holographic microscopy for biological cell imaging at Vizag.

The Low Energy High Intensity Proton Accelerator (LEHIPA) project is under installation at common facility building in BARC premises. The 20 MeV, 30 mA, CW proton linac will consist of a 50 keV ion source, a 3 MeV, 4 m long, radio-frequency quadrupole (RFQ) and a 3-20 MeV, 12 m long, drift-tube linac (DTL) and a beam dump.

Major Atmospheric Cerenkov Experiment Telescope (MACE) is an Imaging Atmospheric Cerenkov telescope (IACT) located near Hanle, Ladakh, India. It is the highest (in altitude) and second largest Cerenkov telescope in the world. It was built by Electronics Corporation of India, Hyderabad, for the Bhabha Atomic Research Centre and was assembled at the campus of Indian Astronomical Observatory at Hanle. The telescope is the second-largest gamma ray telescope in the world and will help the scientific community enhance its understanding in the fields of astrophysics, fundamental physics, and particle acceleration mechanisms. The largest telescope of the same class is the 28-metre-diameter High Energy Stereoscopic System (HESS) telescope being operated in Namibia.

Ongoing basic and applied research encompasses a broad spectrum covering condensed matter physics, nuclear physics, astrophysical sciences and atomic and molecular spectroscopy. Important research areas include advanced magnetism, soft and nano structured materials, energy materials, thin film and multi-layers, accelerator/reactor based fusion-fission studies, nuclear-astrophysics, nuclear data management, reactor based neutrino physics, very high-energy astrophysics and astro-particle physics.

Some of the important ongoing developmental activities are: Indian Scintillat or Matrix for Reactor Anti-Neutrinos (ISMRAN), neutron guides, polarizers and Neutron supermirror, Nb-based superconducting RF cavities, high purity Germanium detector, 2-D neutron detectors, cryogen-free superconducting magnets, electromagnetic separator for radio-isotopes, nuclear batteries and radioisotope thermoelectric generators (RTG) power source and liquid Hydrogen cold neutron source. Other activities include research and developmental towards India-based Neutrino Observatory (INO) and quantum computing.

=== High-performance computing ===
BARC designed and developed a series of supercomputers for their internal usage. They were mainly used for molecular dynamical simulations, reactor physics, theoretical physics, computational chemistry, computational fluid dynamics, and finite element analysis.

The latest in the series is Anupam-Aganya. BARC has started development of supercomputers under the ANUPAM project in 1991 and till date, has developed more than 20 different computer systems. All ANUPAM systems have employed parallel processing as the underlying philosophy and MIMD (Multiple Instruction Multiple Data) as the core architecture. BARC, being a multidisciplinary research organization, has a large pool of scientists and engineers, working in various aspects of nuclear science and technology and thus are involved in doing diverse nature of computation. To keep the gestation period short, the parallel computers were built with commercially available off-the-shelf components, with BARC's major contribution being in the areas of system integration, system engineering, system software development, application software development, fine tuning of the system and support to a diverse set of users.

The series started with a small four-processor system in 1991 with a sustained performance of 34 MFlops. To meet increasing computational demands from the users, new systems have been built regularly with increasing computational power. The notable models in the series of supercomputers is Anupam-Aganya with processing power of 270 TFLOPS and PARALLEL PROCESSING SUPERCOMPUTER ANUPAM-ATULYA. Provides sustained LINPACK performance of 1.35 PetaFlops for solving complex scientific problems.

=== Electronics instrumentation and computers ===
BARC's research and development programing electrical, electronics, instrumentation and computers is in the fields of Nuclear Science and Technology, and this has resulted in the development of various indigenous technologies.

In the fields of nuclear energy, many Control and Instrumentation systems including In Service Inspection Systems were designed, developed and deployed for Nuclear Reactors ranging from PHWR, AHWR, LWR, PFBR, to new generation Research Reactors and C&I for reprocessing facilities. Development of simulators for Nuclear Power Plant used as training facilities for the reactor personal and licensing of reactor operators.

Core competencies cover a wide spectrum and include Process Sensors, Radiation Detector, Nuclear Instruments, Microelectronics, MEMS, Embedded Real Time Systems, Modelling and Simulation, Computer Network, High Integrity Software Engineering, High performance DAQ systems, High Voltage Supplies, Digital Signal Processing, Image Processing, Deep Learning, Motion control, Security Electronics, Medical Electronics etc.

Development of stabilization systems for Seekers, Antenna Platform Unit for LCA HAL Tejas multi-mode Radar, Servo system for Indian Deep Space Network IDSN32- 32 meter antenna which tracked Chandrayaan-I and Mangalyaan, Instrumented PIG for Oil Pipe line inspection, Servo control and camera electronics for MACE telescope, Radiometry and Radiation Monitoring Systems etc.

Various technology spin-offs include products developed for industrial, medical, transportation, security, aero-space and defense applications.

Generic electronic products like Qualified Programmable Logic Controller platform (TPLC-32), suitable for deployment in safety critical applications, Reactivity meters, Machinery Protection systems, Security Gadgets for Physical Protection, Access Control Systems, Perimeter Intrusion Detection Systems, CCTV and Video surveillance Systems, Scanning Electron Microscope, VHF Communication Systems have been developed as part of the indigenization process.

=== Material Sciences and Engineering ===
Materials Science and Engineering plays an important role in all aspects including sustaining and providing support for Indian nuclear program and also developing advanced technologies. The minerals containing elements of interest to DAE e.g. Uranium, Rare-earth elements are taken up for developing beneficiation techniques/flow sheets to improve the metal value for its extraction. The metallic Uranium required for research reactors is produced. Improvement of process efficiency for operating uranium mills is done and inputs for implemented at plants by Uranium Corporation of India. The process flow sheet to separate individual rare earth oxide from different resources (including from secondary sources e.g. scrap/used products) are developed, demonstrated and technology is transferred to Indian Rare Earths Limited (IREL) for production at its plants.

All the requirements of refractory materials for DAE applications including neutron absorber applications are being met by research, development and production in Materials Group. Materials Group works for development of flow sheets/processes for the materials required for DAE plants/applications e.g. Ti sponge, advanced alloys, coatings using various processes including pack cementation, chemical vapour, physical vapour, Electroplating/Electroless plating. Recovery of high purity Cobalt from various wastes/scrap material has also been demonstrated and technologies transferred for productionization.

Research aimed at advanced materials technologies using Thermodynamics, Mechanics, Simulation and Modelling, characterisation and performance evaluation is done. Studies aimed at understanding radiation damage in materials are undertaken using advanced characterization techniques to help in alloy development and material degradation assessment activities. Generation of thermo-physical and defect property database of nuclear materials e.g., Thoria-based Mixed oxide and metallic fuels; studies on Fe-Zr alloys and natural and synthetic minerals as hosts for metallic waste immobilization through modelling and simulations is being pursued.

Development of novel solvents to extract selected elements from the nuclear waste for medical applications and specific metallic values from E-waste is being done. Technologies such as Large-scale synthesis of carbon nanotube (CNT), low-carbon ferro-alloys (FeV, FeMo, FeNb, FeW, FeTi and FeC), Production of tungsten metal powder and fabrication of tungsten (W) and tungsten heavy alloy (WHA) and Production of zirconium diboride (ZrB_{2}) powder and Fabrication of high density ZrB_{2} shapes etc., have been realised.

=== Chemical Engineering and Sciences ===
The key features underlying the development effort are self-reliance, achieving products with very high purity specifications, working with separation processes characterized by low separation factors, aiming high recoveries, optimal utilization of scarce resources, environmental benignity, high energy efficiency and stable continuous operation. Non-power application of nuclear energy has been demonstrated in the area of water desalination using the technologies such as Multi Stage Flash Distillation and Multi Effect Distillation with Thermo Vapor Compression (MED-TVC). Membrane technologies have been deployed not only for nuclear waste treatment but for society at large in line with the Jal Jeevan Mission of Government of India to provide safe drinking water at the household level.

Development and demonstration of fluidized bed technology for applications in nuclear fuel cycle; synthesis and evaluation of novel extractants; synthesis of TBM materials (synthesis of lithium titanate pebbles); molecular modeling for various phenomena (such as permeation of hydrogen and its isotopes through different metals, desalination using carbon nanotubes, effect of composition of glass on properties relevant for vitrification, design of solvents and metal organic frameworks); applications of microreactors for intensification of specific processes; development of low temperature freeze desalination process; environment-friendly integrated zero liquid discharge based desalination systems; treatment of industrial effluents; new generation membranes (such as high performance graphene-based nanocomposite membranes, membranes for haemodialysis, forward osmosis and metallic membranes); hydrogen generation and storage by various processes (electrochemical water splitting, iodine-sulphur thermochemical, copper-chlorinehybrid thermochemical cycles); development of adsorptive gel materials for specific separations; heavy water upgradation; metal coatings for various applications (such as membrane permeator, neutron generator and special applications);fluidized bed chemical vapour deposition; and chemical process applications of Ultrasound Technology (UT).

A pre-cooled modified Claude cycle based 50 L/hr capacity helium liquefier (LHP50) has been developed and commissioned by BARC at Trombay. Major component technologies involved in LHP50 include ultra-high speed gas bearing supported miniature turboexpanders and compact plate fin heat exchangers along with cryogenic piping and long-stem valves all housed inside the LHP50 Cold Box. Other major equipment include a coaxial helium transfer line and a liquid helium receiver vessel.

=== Environment, Radiology and Radiochemical Science ===
BARC also monitors Environmental impact and dose / risk assessment for radiological and chemical contaminants, Environmental surveillance and radiation protection for the entire nuclear fuel cycle facilities, Meteorological and hydro-geological investigations for DAE sites. Modelling of contaminant transport and dispersion in the atmosphere and hydrosphere, Radiological impact assessment of waste management and disposal practices, Development of Environmental Radiation Monitoring systems and Establishment of country wide radiation monitoring network, establishment of benchmarks for assessing the radiological impact of the nuclear power activities on the marine environment.

The highlights of these programs are Positron and positronium chemistry, Actinide chemistry and spectroscopy, Isotope hydrology for water resource management, Radiotracer for Industrial Applications, separation and purification of new, radionuclides for medical applications, advance fuel development by sol gel method, chemical quality control of nuclear fuels, complexation and speciation of actinides, Separation method development for back end fuel cycle processes.

The other major research projects are thermo-physical property evaluation of molten salt breeder reactor (MSBR) systems, development of core-catcher materials, hydrogen mitigation, catalysts for hydrogen production, hydrogen storage materials, nanotherapeutics and bio-sensors, decontamination of reactor components, biofouling control and thermal ecology studies, supramolecular chemistry, environmental and interfacial chemistry, ultrafast reaction dynamics, single molecule spectroscopy, synthesis and applications of nanomaterials, cold plasma applications, luminescent materials for bio-imaging, materials for light emitting devices and security applications etc.

=== Health, Food and agriculture ===
Development of new elite crop varieties including oil seeds and pulses. Using radiation-induced mutagenesis, hybridization, and tissue culture techniques 49 crop varieties have been developed, released and Gazette-notified for commercial cultivation. Development of molecular markers, transgenics, biosensors, fertilizer formulations with improved nutrient use efficiency. Understanding DNA damage repair, replication, redox biology and autophagy process and development of radio-sensitizers, chemo-sensitizers for cancer therapy. Design and synthesis of organo-fluorophores and organic electronic molecules, relevant to nuclear sciences and societal benefits (advanced technology and health). Design and synthesis of organo-fluorophores and organic electronic molecules, relevant to nuclear sciences and societal benefits (advanced technology and health).

Synthesis and development of nuclear medicine ligands for diagnosis and therapy of cancer and other diseases. Asymmetric total synthesis and organocatalytic methods (green chemistry approach) for the synthesis of biologically active compounds. R&D activities in the frontier areas of radiation biology for understanding the effect of low- and high LET radiations, chronic and acute radiation exposure, high background radiation, and radionuclide exposure on mammalian cells, cancer cells, experimental rodents and human health.

Preclinical and translational research is aimed at development of new drugs and therapeutics for prevention and mitigation of radiation injury, de-corporation of heavy metals and treatment of inflammatory disorders and cancers.

Studying macromolecular structures and protein-ligand interactions using biophysical techniques like X-ray crystallography, neutron-scattering, circular dichroism and synchrotron radiation, with an aim for ab-initio design of therapeutic molecules. Understanding the cellular and molecular basis of stress response in bacteria, plants and animals. Understanding the extraordinary resistance to DNA damage and oxidative stress tolerance in bacteria, and epigenetic regulation of alternate splicing in plants and mammalian cells.

Development of CRISPR-Cas mediated genome editing technologies in both basic and applied research and is engaged in the development of gene technologies and products for bio-medical applications. Studies on uranium sequestration by Nostoc and bacteria isolated from uranium mines. Research and development of novel radiopharmaceuticals for diagnostic and therapeutic purposes.

Synthesis of substrates from suitable precursors for use in radio-labeling with diagnostic (^{99m}Tc) and therapeutic (^{177}Lu, ^{153}Sm, ^{166}Ho, ^{186/188}Re, ^{109}Pd, ^{90}Y, ^{175}Yb, ^{170}Tm) radioisotopes in the preparation of agents intended for use as radiopharmaceuticals.

Custom preparation of special sources to suit the requirements of the Defense Research Organization of India (DRDO) and National Research Laboratories such as National Physics Research Laboratory, ISRO etc.

== India's three-stage nuclear power programme ==
India's three-stage nuclear power programme was formulated by Homi Bhabha in the 1950s to secure the country's long term energy independence, through the use of uranium and thorium reserves found in the monazite sands of coastal regions of South India. The ultimate focus of the programme is on enabling the thorium reserves of India to be utilised in meeting the country's energy requirements. Thorium is particularly attractive for India, as it has only around 1–2% of the global uranium reserves, but one of the largest shares of global thorium reserves at about 25% of the world's known thorium reserves.

=== Stage I – Pressurised Heavy Water Reactor ===
In the first stage of the programme, natural uranium fueled pressurised heavy water reactors (PHWR) produce electricity while generating plutonium-239 as by-product. PHWRs were a natural choice for implementing the first stage because it had the most efficient reactor design in terms of uranium utilisation, and the existing Indian infrastructure in the 1960s allowed for quick adoption of the PHWR technology. Natural uranium contains only 0.7% of the fissile isotope uranium-235. Most of the remaining 99.3% is uranium-238 which is not fissile but can be converted in a reactor to the fissile isotope plutonium-239. Heavy water (deuterium oxide, D_{2}O) is used as moderator and coolant.

=== Stage II – Fast Breeder Reactor ===
In the second stage, fast breeder reactors (FBRs) would use a mixed oxide (MOX) fuel made from plutonium-239, recovered by reprocessing spent fuel from the first stage, and natural uranium. In FBRs, plutonium-239 undergoes fission to produce energy, while the uranium-238 present in the mixed oxide fuel transmutes to additional plutonium-239. Thus, the Stage II FBRs are designed to "breed" more fuel than they consume. Once the inventory of plutonium-239 is built up thorium can be introduced as a blanket material in the reactor and transmuted to uranium-233 for use in the third stage The surplus plutonium bred in each fast reactor can be used to set up more such reactors, and might thus grow the Indian civil nuclear power capacity till the point where the third stage reactors using thorium as fuel can be brought online. The design of the country's first fast breeder, called Prototype Fast Breeder Reactor (PFBR), was done by Indira Gandhi Centre for Atomic Research (IGCAR).

==== Doubling time ====
Doubling time refers to the time required to extract as output, double the amount of fissile fuel, which was fed as input into the breeder reactors. This metric is critical for understanding the time durations that are unavoidable while transitioning from the second stage to the third stage of Bhabha's plan, because building up a sufficiently large fissile stock is essential to the large deployment of the third stage.

=== Stage III – Thorium Based Reactors ===
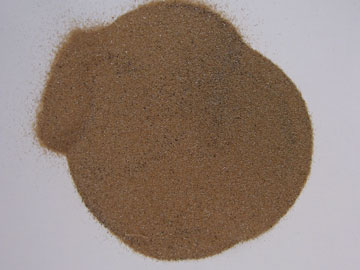
Monazite powder, a rare earth and thorium phosphate mineral, is the primary source of the world's thorium.

A Stage III reactor or an Advanced nuclear power system involves a self-sustaining series of thorium-232–uranium-233 fuelled reactors. This would be a thermal breeder reactor, which in principle can be refueled – after its initial fuel charge – using only naturally occurring thorium. According to the three-stage programme, Indian nuclear energy could grow to about 10 GW through PHWRs fueled by domestic uranium, and the growth above that would have to come from FBRs till about 50GW.[b] The third stage is to be deployed only after this capacity has been achieved.

==== Parallel approaches ====
As there is a long delay before direct thorium utilisation in the three-stage programme, the country is looking at reactor designs that allow more direct use of thorium in parallel with the sequential three-stage programme. Three options under consideration are the Indian Accelerator Driven Systems (IADS), Advanced Heavy Water Reactor (AHWR) and Compact High Temperature Reactor. Molten Salt Reactor is also under development.

India's Department of Atomic Energy and the US's Fermilab are designing accelerator driven systems. No country has yet built an Accelerator Driven System for power generation. Anil Kakodkar, former chairman of the Atomic Energy Commission called this a mega science project and a "necessity" for humankind.

== Reactor design ==
BARC has developed a wide array of nuclear reactor designs for nuclear research, production of radioisotopes, naval propulsion and electricity generation

=== Research reactors and production of radioisotopes ===
Reactor	Purpose and History
APSARA	Apsara was India's first nuclear reactor built at BARC in 1956 to conduct basic research in nuclear physics. It is 1 MWTh light water cooled and moderated swimming pool type thermal reactor that went critical on 4 August 1956 and is suitable for production of isotopes, basic nuclear research, shielding experiments, neutron activation analysis, neutron radiography and testing of neutron detectors. It was shut down permanently in 2010 and replaced with Apsara-U
APSARA-U	Apsara-U or Apsara-Upgraded is a replacement for APSARA. It is 2 MWTh light water cooled and moderated swimming pool type thermal reactor fuelled with uranium silicide. It went critical on September 10, 2018, and is suitable for production of isotopes, basic nuclear research, shielding experiments, neutron activation analysis and testing of neutron detectors.
ZERLINA	ZERLINA was a Heavy water cooled and moderated vertical tank type thermal reactor built to conduct reactor lattice studies that first went critical on 14 January 1961. It was decommissioned in 1983.
Dhruva	Dhruva is a 100 MWth heavy water moderated and cooled vertical tank type thermal reactor primarily used for production of radioisotopes and weapons grade plutonium-239 for nuclear weapons and was successor to the Canadian built CIRUS reactor at BARC. It first went critical on August 8, 1985, and was later upgraded in the late 2010s.
Purnima-I	Purnima-I is a Plutonium oxide fuelled 1 MWTh pulsed-fast reactor that was built starting in 1970 and went critical on 18 May 1972 to primarily support the validation of design parameters for development of Plutonium-239 powered nuclear weapons. On the twentieth anniversary of the 1974 Pokhran nuclear test, Purnima's designer, P. K. Iyengar, reflected on the reactor's critical role: "Purnima was a novel device, built with about 20 kg of plutonium, a variable geometry of reflectors, and a unique control system. This gave considerable experience and helped to benchmark calculations regarding the behaviour of a chain-reacting system made out of plutonium. The kinetic behaviour of the system just above critical could be well studied. Very clever physicists could then calculate the time behaviour of the core of a bomb on isotropic compression. What the critical parameters would be, how to achieve optimum explosive power, and its dependence on the first self sustaining neutron trigger, were all investigated". It was decommissioned in 1973.
Purnima-II	Purnima-II is Uranium-233 fuelled 100 mW vertical tank type thermal reactor built to support Uranium-233 fuel studies and was decommissioned in 1986.
Purnima-III	Purnima-III Uranium-233 fuelled 1 WTh vertical tank type thermal reactor built to conduct mockup studies for the KAMINI reactor built at IGCAR, Kalpakkam. It was decommissioned in 1996.
FBTR	The Fast Breeder Test Reactor (FBTR) is a breeder reactor located at Kalpakkam, India. The Indira Gandhi Center for Atomic Research (IGCAR) and Bhabha Atomic Research Centre (BARC) jointly designed, constructed, and operate the reactor. The reactor was designed to produce 40 MW of thermal power and 13.2 MW of electrical power. The initial nuclear fuel core used in the FBTR consisted of approximately 50 kg of weapons-grade plutonium. The reactor uses a plutonium-uranium mixed carbide fuel and liquid sodium as a coolant. The fuel is an indigenous mix of 70 percent plutonium carbide and 30 percent uranium carbide. Plutonium for the fuel is extracted from irradiated fuel in the Madras power reactors and reprocessed in Tarapur. Some of the uranium is created from the transmutation of thorium bundles that are also placed in the core. Using the experience gained from the operation of the FBTR, a 500 MWe Prototype Fast Breeder Reactor (PFBR) is in advanced stage of construction at Kalpakkam.

=== Commercial reactors and power generation ===
==== Pressurized heavy-water reactors ====
BARC has developed various sizes of IPHWR class of pressurized heavy-water reactors powered by Natural Uranium for the first-stage Three-stage nuclear power programme which produce electricity and plutonium-239 to power the fast-breeder reactors being developed by IGCAR for the second stage of the program.

The IPHWR class was developed from the CANDU reactors built at RAPS in Rawatbhata, Rajasthan. As of 2020, three successively larger designs IPHWR-220, IPHWR-540 and IPHWR-700 of electricity generation capacity of 220 MWe, 540 MWe and 700 MWe respectively have been developed.

==== Advanced heavy-water reactor ====
BARC is developing a 300 MWe advanced heavy-water reactor design that is powered by thorium-232 and uranium-233 to power the third stage of India's three-stage nuclear power programme. The AHWR at standard is set to be a closed nuclear fuel cycle. AHWR-300 is expected to have design life close to 100 years and will utilise Uranium-233 produced in the fast-breeder reactors being developed by IGCAR.

==== Bharat small modular reactor ====
The Bharat small modular reactor (BSMR) is a reactor design under development at the BARC. It is a joint project with the NPCIL. It is a 220MWe small reactor being developed for captive use. A 55MWe SMR and a 5MWth High temperature gas cooled reactor are also in the design stage.

==== Indian molten salt breeder reactor ====
The Indian molten salt breeder reactor (IMSBR) is the platform to burn thorium as part of 3rd stage of Indian nuclear power programme. The fuel in IMSBR is in the form of a continuously circulating molten fluoride salt which flows through heat exchangers for ultimately transferring heat for power production to Super-critical CO_{2} based Brayton cycle (SCBC) so as to have larger energy conversion ratio as compared to existing power-conversion cycle. Because of the fluid fuel, online reprocessing is possible, extracting the 233Pa (formed in conversion chain of 232Th to 233U) and allowing it to decay to 233U outside the core, thus making it possible to breed even in thermal neutron spectrum. Hence IMSBR can operate in self-sustaining 233U-Th fuel cycle. Additionally, being a thermal reactor, the 233U requirement is lower (as compared to fast spectrum), thus allowing higher deployment potential.

==== Light-water reactors ====
BARC with experience gained from the development of the light-water reactor for the Arihant-class submarine is developing a large 900 MWe pressurized water reactor design known as IPWR-900. The design will include Generation III+ safety features like Passive Decay Heat Removal System, Emergency Core Cooling System (ECCS), Corium Retention and Core Catcher System.

=== Marine propulsion for naval application ===
BARC has developed multiple designs of light-water reactor designs suitable for nuclear marine propulsion for Indian Navy submarines beginning with the CLWR-B1 reactor design for the Arihant-class submarine.Total four submarine will be built for this class.

== India and the NPT ==
India is not a part of the Nuclear Non-Proliferation Treaty (NPT), citing concerns that it unfairly favours the established nuclear powers, and provides no provision for complete nuclear disarmament. Indian officials argued that India's refusal to sign the treaty stemmed from its fundamentally discriminatory character; the treaty places restrictions on the non-nuclear weapons states but does little to curb the modernisation and expansion of the nuclear arsenals of the nuclear weapons states.

More recently, India and the United States signed an agreement to enhance nuclear cooperation between the two countries, and for India to participate in an international consortium on fusion research, ITER (International Thermonuclear Experimental Reactor).

== Civilian research ==
The BARC also researches biotechnology at the Gamma Gardens and has developed numerous disease-resistant and high-yielding crop varieties, particularly groundnuts. It also conducts research in Liquid Metal Magnetohydrodynamics for power generation.

On 4 June 2005, intending to encourage research in basic sciences, BARC started the Homi Bhabha National Institute. Research institutions affiliated to BARC(Bhabha Atomic Research Centre) include IGCAR (Indira Gandhi Centre for Atomic Research), RRCAT (Raja Ramanna Centre for Advanced Technology), and VECC (Variable Energy Cyclotron Centre).

Power projects that have benefited from BARC expertise but which fall under the NPCIL (Nuclear Power Corporation of India Limited) are KAPP (Kakrapar Atomic Power Project), RAPP (Rajasthan Atomic Power Project), and TAPP (Tarapur Atomic Power Project).

The Bhabha Atomic Research Centre in addition to its nuclear research mandate also conducts research in other high technology areas like accelerators, micro electron beams, materials design, supercomputers, and computer vision among the few. The BARC has dedicated departments for these specialized fields. BARC has designed and developed, for its own use an infrastructure of supercomputers, Anupam using state of the art technology.

== See also ==
- IPHWR, class of PHWR electricity generation reactors designed by BARC
- AHWR, thorium fuelled reactor being designed by BARC
- Milw0rm#BARC attack
- Department of Atomic Energy, Government of India
- Indira Gandhi Centre for Atomic Research
- Raja Ramanna Centre for Advanced Technology
- Variable Energy Cyclotron Centre
- Homi Bhabha Cancer Hospital and Research Centre (disambiguation)
