= Particle experiments at Kolar Gold Fields =

Deep mine cosmic ray neutrino observations (1960–1992)

Coordinates: 12°56′25.6″N 78°15′34″E

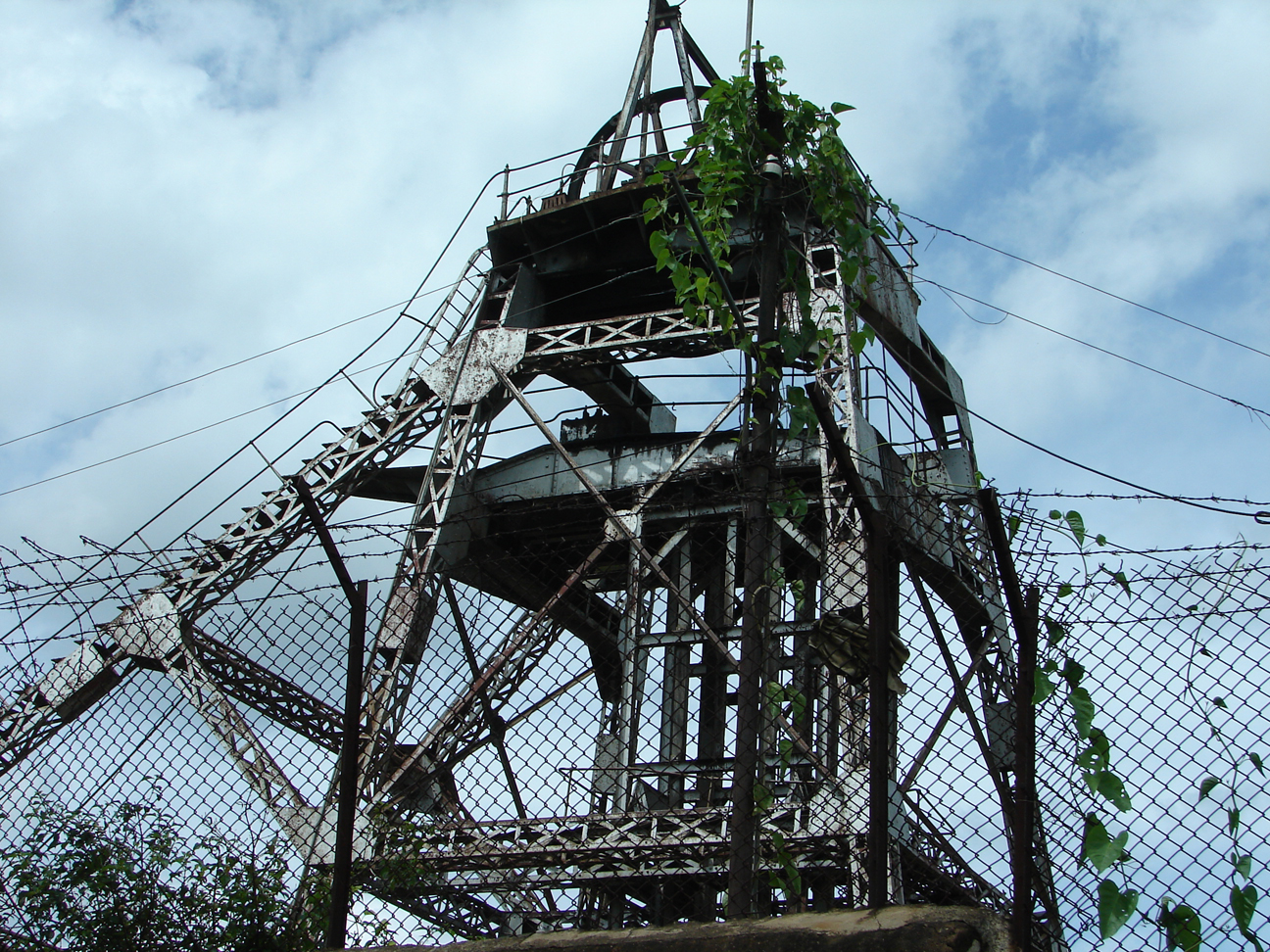
The Champion Reefs mine shaft at KGF

The Kolar Gold Fields (KGF), located in the Kolar district of the state of Karnataka, India, are a set of defunct gold mines known for the neutrino particle experiments and unusual observations that took place there starting in 1960. The experiments ended with the closing of the mine in 1992.

== Initial experiments ==
The initial experiments that took place in KGF were related to the study of cosmic ray muons. KGF was chosen because the depths of its mines allowed muons to be studied in a better environment than what was possible with magnet spectrometers operated at sea level. KGF also allowed the scientists to study the energy spectrum and angular distributions of muons even at very high energies. The mines had abundance of Kolar rock whose special characteristics with respect to density and chemical composition (different from that of normal rock) were also a useful advantage in the experiments. The first experiments involving variations of muon fluxes (a measurement of muons passing through a given media) with depth was conducted by B. V. Sreekantan in 1950s. These were followed by experiments in 1961 by S. Miyake, V. S. Narasimham, P. V. Ramana Murty (also spelled Ramanamurty in some occasions), the trio sometimes called MNR, and sponsored by TIFR. During 1984, Naba Kumar Mondal, TIFR, and Prof. Ito, Osaka City University, Japan, performed experimental studies on proton decay and indirectly observed the scatter of muons. Murali and Balasubramaniam briefly assisted Mondal and Ito as research assistants.

== Finding The Neutrinos ==
Neutrino-related experiments were started in KGF in 1964. The main goal was the detection of atmospheric neutrinos, with an understanding that cosmic rays colliding with atmospheric nuclei produce high energy pions and muons, which decay in the Earth's atmosphere to produce billions of neutrinos. The experiments were conducted by groups from TIFR, Durham University and Osaka University (Bombay-Osaka-Durham collaboration) using basic trigger with scintillation counters and Neon Flash Tubes (NFT) for tracking detectors. Seven detectors were deployed at a depth of 2.3 km in Heathcote shaft and Champion Reefs mines. The experiment, using an iron calorimeter, discovered the first atmospheric neutrinos about the same time (in 1965) as a similar discovery took place in the East Rand Proprietary Mines (ERPM experiment) in South Africa. The South African experiment begun in 1965, took place 3200 meters underground and was managed by groups from Case Institute of Technology, University of California, Irvine and University of the Witwatersrand. The effort was led by Frederick Reines and the liquid scintillator detector used was called the Case-Witwatersrand-Irvine or CWI detector.

Although the KGF group detected neutrino candidates two months later than Reines CWI, they were given formal priority for first discovery of atmospheric neutrinos due to publishing their findings two weeks earlier.

== Kolar events ==
Some experimental observations, called Kolar events, have yet to be explained. They suggest the existence of massive (>3 GeV) particles having a long life (10^{−9} secs). These massive particles are also seen to decay into 2–3 particles. It has been postulated that they could be the result of neutrino interactions or dark matter decay.

== See also ==
- India-based Neutrino Observatory
