= Etcheverry Hall =

Building at the University of California, Berkeley

Coordinates: 37.875663°N 122.25928°W

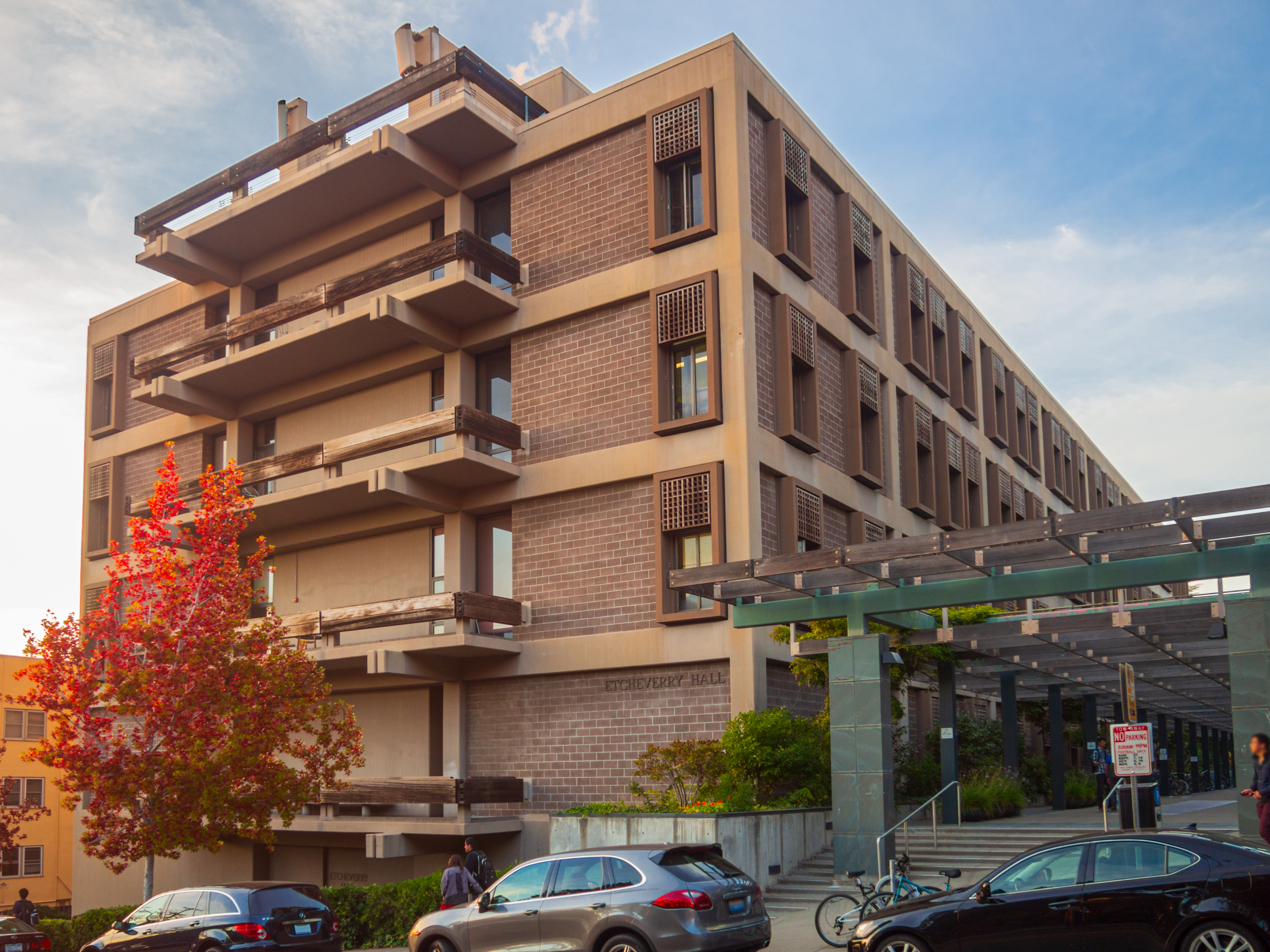
Etcheverry Hall

Etcheverry Hall houses the Departments of Mechanical, Industrial, and Nuclear Engineering of the College of Engineering at the University of California, Berkeley. Etcheverry Hall is named after Bernard A. Etcheverry, professor of irrigation and drainage from 1915 to 1951, who later served as chair of the Department of Irrigation and Drainage from 1923–51. Built in 1964, it is located on the north side of Hearst Avenue, across the street from the main campus.

The basement of Etcheverry Hall housed the Berkeley Research Reactor between 1966 and 1987.

== Bernard A. Etcheverry ==
Bernard Alfred Etcheverry was born in San Diego, California, on June 30, 1881, and graduated from UC Berkeley in 1902. He married Helen Hanson on August 6, 1903, and together they had two sons, Bernard Earle and Alfred Starr.

His first teaching appointment was to the Department of Civil Engineering at UC Berkeley, where he taught during the 1902–03 academic year. After that, he taught physics and civil engineering at the University of Nevada for two years before returning to Berkeley for the remainder of his career, from 1905 until his retirement in 1951. In addition to teaching, he served as an engineer for the construction of the Hearst Greek Theatre on the Berkeley campus. He moved into a new home in Kensington in 1953.

Professor Etcheverry died on October 26, 1954, in New Haven, Connecticut.

== Renovations ==
The basement reactor room currently houses large experiments for the Department of Nuclear Engineering at Berkeley, including the Compact Integral Effects Test (CIET), which studies the thermal hydraulics, design, and operation of fluoride salt-cooled high temperature reactors.

The V&A Café opened on the third floor of Etcheverry Hall in June 2017. This followed a series of renovations begun in 2016 planned to take place over a 10-year period to modernize the building.
