= Homi Bhabha National Institute =

Indian deemed university

- HBNI Building at Bhabha Atomic Research Centre, Mumbai
- Type: Deemed university and Central Government Engineering Training Institute
- Established: 2005; 21 years ago
- Founders: Department of Atomic Energy with Ravi Grover as the founder director.
- Chancellor: Dr. Anil Kakodkar
- Vice-Chancellor: U. Kamachi Mudali
- Academic staff: 1007
- Location: Mumbai, Maharashtra, 400094, India; 19.034°N 72.926°E
- Website: http://www.hbni.ac.in/

The Homi Bhabha National Institute (HBNI) is an Indian deemed university established by the Department of Atomic Energy, which unifies academic programmes of several of its constituent institutions. Homi Bhabha National Institute, Mumbai and its Constituent Units are the institutions of excellence as per section 4(b) of "The Central Education Institutions (Reservation in Admission) Act, 2006".

National Assessment and Accreditation Council has accredited HBNI with a CGPA of 3.40 on a four-point scale at A+ grade valid up to 25 March 2026.

== History ==
The Indian Department of Atomic Energy (DAE) was set up in 1954 and its mandate includes research including fundamental research in matters connected with atomic energy and the development of its uses in power generation, research, agriculture, industry and health care and advancement of higher mathematics. In pursuit of its mandate DAE has established several research and development centres, grant-in-aid institutions and has taken in its fold several existing grant-in-aid institutions. All research institutions under the umbrella of the DAE have been pursuing academic programme right from their inception. Considering continued expansion of atomic energy programme and considering the fact that the DAE institutions are engaged in human resource development programmes, the DAE Science Research Council recommended in 2003 that the DAE should establish a university-level institution. After completing all formalities, Prime minister of India, Manmohan Singh, announced the approval of the government of India for setting up of HBNI on 4 June 2005. It is named after the late Indian physicist Homi J. Bhabha. The HRD Ministry of the government of India declared Homi Bhabha National Institute (HBNI) a deemed to be university along with ten Constituent Institutions (CIs).

The first director/vice-chancellor, Ravi Grover has written a brief history of the institute in an article published by him on the website of the Indian National Academy of Engineering. He has also written an article in Current Science (10 October 2019) explaining the rationale for setting up the institute.

== Academic programmes ==
For developing a well trained central government engineers in the area of nuclear science and engineering, DAE established the "Training School" in 1957 at Trombay, Mumbai. Courses are conducted at all CIs and at BARC Training schools

== Rankings ==
University rankings

General – India
- NIRF (Overall) (2024): 27
- NIRF (Research) (2024): 6
- NIRF (Universities) (2024): 16

The National Institutional Ranking Framework (NIRF) ranked Homi Bhabha National Institute 6th in research,16th among universities and 27th overall in 2024 in India.

The Nature Index has ranked HBNI 10th in the world under the ranking of "Nine universities under 50 in the fast lane", published in 2019.

The Nature Index 2020 Annual Tables highlight the institutions and countries that dominated high quality research in the natural sciences in 2019 as tracked by Nature Index. The rankings are based on an institution's or country's share of articles published in the 82 prestigious scientific journals selected by an independent panel of experts and tracked by the Nature Index database. According to Nature Index 2020, HBNI ranked at second position, behind Indian Institute of Science, among all academic institutions in India based on publications (count as well as share) during the period 1 March 2019 to 29 February 2020.

== Constituent institutions ==
1. Bhabha Atomic Research Centre, Mumbai
2. Indira Gandhi Centre for Atomic Research, Kalpakkam
3. Raja Ramanna Centre for Advanced Technology, Indore
4. Variable Energy Cyclotron Centre, Kolkata
5. Saha Institute of Nuclear Physics, Kolkata
6. Institute for Plasma Research, Gandhinagar
7. Institute of Physics, Bhubaneswar
8. Harish-Chandra Research Institute, Prayagraj
9. Tata Memorial Centre, Mumbai
10. Institute of Mathematical Sciences, Chennai
11. National Institute of Science Education and Research, Bhubaneswar
12. Homi Bhabha Cancer Hospital and Mahamana Pandit Madan Mohan Malaviya Cancer Centre, Varanasi
