= WA93 experiment =

High energy physics experiment

WA93 experiment (Synonym: Light Universal Detector or LUD) was a detector experiment conducted at CERN for studying the correlations between photons and charged particles. It was an experimental program of CERN and part of the research programme SPS. The experiment was majorly conducted by the Indian High-Energy Heavy Ion Physics Team at CERN-SPS. For measurement of the multiplicity and the rapidity and azimuthal distributions of photons in ultra-relativistic heavy ion collisions, Photon Multiplicity Detector was implemented in the experiment. The experiment was led by Indian physicist Y P Viyogi. Hans H. Gutbrod was the spokesperson of the experimental project. The experimental project was approved on 22 November 1990. The experiment was completed on 9 May 2002.

Timeline of the CERN-SPS relativistic heavy ion program and experiments.

== Description ==
WA93 experiment was a high-energy physics experiment conducted at CERN's Super Proton Synchrotron (SPS). Its primary goal was studying the properties of quark-gluon plasma (QGP), a hypothetical state of matter believed to have existed in the early universe. According to Big Bang theory, the entire universe was filled with quark–gluon plasma before the matter as we know it was created.

In the experiment, heavy ions, such as sulfur and gold at extremely high energies were involved in collisions to create conditions similar to those shortly after the Big Bang.

== Components of experimental setup ==
The major components of the WA93 experimental setup were beam counter, large magnet dipole, Multi Step Avalanche Chambers, Silicon Drift Detector, Photon Multiplicity Detector, Lead-Glass Spectrometer, Streamer-Tube Detectors, Mid-rapidity Calorimeter, Zero-Degree Calorimeter, Trigger System and Charged-Particle Spectrometer.
