= Photon Multiplicity Detector =

Detectors in Nuclear Physics

- Process type: Nuclear Technology
- Main technologies or sub-processes: 1. High-energy physics experiments; 2. Measurement of the number and spatial distribution of photons produced in particle collisions; 3. Study of Quark-Gluon Plasma
- Product(s): Photon Detector
- Leading companies: 1. Variable Energy Cyclotron Centre, Kolkata 2. Institute of Physics, Bhubaneswar

Photon Multiplicity Detector (PMD) is a detector used in the measurement of the multiplicity and spatial distribution of photons produced in nucleus - nucleus collisions. In short form, it is denoted by PMD. It was incorporated in the WA93 experiment. The funding for research and development of the design of PMD was done by the Department of Atomic Energy (DAE) and the Department of Science and Technology (DST) of the Government of India. The detector was constructed in the collaboration of Variable Energy Cyclotron Centre in Kolkata, Institute of Physics in Bhubaneswar and group of universities at Chandigarh, Jaipur and Jammu.

== Description ==
A PMD typically consists of two main layers Veto Detector and Preshower Detector. Veto Detector layer is designed to reject charged particles. Photons pass through a converter in Preshower Detector layer, initiating an electromagnetic shower. The detector then measures the number of cells activated by the shower, providing information about the photon's energy and position.

At ALICE experiment, PMD was used to measure the multiplicity and pseudorapidity density distributions of inclusive photons at forward rapidity, spanning the range η = 2.3 to 3.9. The measurement was conducted using LHC Run 1 and 2 data by PMD in pp (proton - proton collisions), pPb and Pbp collisions at a centre-of-mass energy of 5.02 TeV per nucleon pair.
