= Uranium disilicide =

Identifiers
CAS Number	12039-85-9
ChemSpider	4891883
ECHA InfoCard	100.031.721
EC Number	234-906-4
PubChem CID	6336890
CompTox Dashboard (EPA)	DTXSID501313966
- InChI: InChI=1S/2Si.U Key: KEZPQLNBRPWCBH-UHFFFAOYSA-N

Properties
Chemical formula	USi_{2}
Molar mass	294.199 g/mol
- Except where otherwise noted, data are given for materials in their standard state (at 25 °C [77 °F], 100 kPa). Infobox references

Uranium disilicide is an inorganic chemical compound of uranium in oxidation state +4. It is a silicide of uranium. There has been recent interest in using uranium disilicide as an alternative to uranium dioxide for fuel in nuclear reactors. Advantages are higher percentage of uranium and higher thermal conductivity. A direct replacement of UO_{2} with U_{3}Si_{2} should enable a reactor to generate more energy from a set of fuel rods and also provide more "coping time" in the case of a LOCA (Loss of Cooling Accident).

The development of uranium disilicide, uranium nitride, or other high thermal conductivity uranium compound may be critical for the performance of "Accident Tolerant Fuel", a development effort mandated by the US Department of Energy. This is due to zircalloy having a higher thermal conductivity than all replacement materials being developed. In particular, SIC-SiC CMC (link), which has several superior material properties to zircalloy for this application, has about five times lower thermal conductivity (varies due to the manufacturing methods used for the fiber and for the matrix) than zircalloy.(refs on SiC-SiC and zircalloy). The lower thermal conductivity means that a reactor using fuel rods with SiC-SiC CMC cladding and conventional UO_{2} fuel will have to either: 1) Run at a lower power output to keep the fuel the same temperature, or 2) Run with the same power, with the fuel hotter, which means the reactor has less coping time (time to fix what is wrong before something fails). The alternative, enabled by U_{3}Si_{2} which has about five times better thermal conductivity than UO_{2} , is expected to be a fuel rod capable of equal power output, slightly better energy output, and longer coping time.
