= Homi Bhabha Cancer Hospital and Research Centre =

Homi Bhabha Cancer Hospital and Research Centre may refer to the following hospitals:

- Homi Bhabha Cancer Hospital and Research Centre, Visakhapatnam
- Homi Bhabha Cancer Hospital and Research Centre, New Chandigarh
- Homi Bhabha Cancer Hospital and Research Centre, Muzaffarpur
