= Variable Energy Cyclotron Centre =

Particle accelerator research centre in India

- Abbreviation: VECC
- Formation: c. 1977; 49 years ago
- Headquarters: Bidhannagar
- Locations: Kolkata, India; New Town; Chak Garia
- Coordinates: 22°36′3.6″N 88°25′9.12″E
- Fields: Nuclear research; High-energy nuclear physics; Health physics; Nuclear medicine; Radiation damage; Isotope production; Accelerator physics; Analytical chemistry; Accelerator technology; Material Research; Particle physics; Radiochemistry; Computer science & technology
- Director: Vaishali Naik
- Parent organisation: Department of Atomic Energy
- Affiliations: Homi Bhabha National Institute
- Budget: ₹291.27 crore (US$34.5 million) (2026–27)
- Website: www.vecc.gov.in

The Variable Energy Cyclotron Centre (VECC) is a premier research and development unit of the Department of Atomic Energy, Government of India. The VECC has three campuses located in Kolkata, India and performs research in basic and applied nuclear sciences and development of the latest nuclear particle accelerators. It has a collaboration with the European Organization for Nuclear Research. The Centre houses a 224 cm cyclotron—the first of its kind in India—which has been operational since 16 June 1977. It provides proton, deuteron, alpha particle and heavy ion beams of various energies to other institutions.

The Centre consists of major facilities such as K130 Cyclotron, K500 Superconducting Cyclotron, Cyclone-30 Medical Cyclotron, Radioactive Ion Beam (RIB) Facility, Computing Centre, Regional Radiation Medicine Centre and a new Campus for the proposed ANURIB project at New Town, Rajarhat. The ANURIB (Advanced National facility for Unstable & Rare-Isotope Beams) is a planned facility, to be constructed in collaboration with the Canada-based research institute TRIUMF. ANURIB is going to conduct experiments of unstable & rare isotope beams.
