= List of things named after Srinivasa Ramanujan =

Srinivasa Ramanujan (1887 – 1920) is the eponym of all of the topics listed below.

== Mathematics ==
- Brocard–Ramanujan Diophantine equation
- Dougall–Ramanujan identity
- Landau–Ramanujan constant
- Ramanujan's congruences
- Hardy–Ramanujan number
- Hardy–Ramanujan theorem
- Hardy–Ramanujan asymptotic formula
- Ramanujan identity
- Ramanujan machine
- Ramanujan–Nagell equation
- Ramanujan–Peterssen conjecture
- Ramanujan–Soldner constant
- Ramanujan summation
- Ramanujan theta function
- Ramanujan graph
- Ramanujan's tau function
- Ramanujan's ternary quadratic form
- Ramanujan prime
- Ramanujan's constant
- Ramanujan's lost notebook
- Ramanujan's master theorem
- Ramanujan's sum
- Rogers–Ramanujan identities
- Rogers–Ramanujan continued fraction
- Ramanujan–Sato series
- Ramanujan magic square

== Journals ==
- Hardy–Ramanujan Journal
- Journal of the Ramanujan Mathematical Society
- Ramanujan Journal

== Institutions and societies ==
- Ramanujan College, University of Delhi
- Ramanujan Institute for Advanced Study in Mathematics
- Ramanujan Mathematical Society
- Srinivasa Ramanujan Centre at Sastra University
- Srinivasa Ramanujan Concept School
- Ramanujan Hostel, Indian Institute of Management, Calcutta
- Ramanujan computer centre, Department of Mathematics, Rajdhani College, University of Delhi
- Srinivisa Ramanujan Library, Indian Institute of Science Education and Research, Pune

== Prizes and awards ==
- Srinivasa Ramanujan Medal
- SASTRA Ramanujan Prize
- DST-ICTP-IMU Ramanujan Prize
- Ramanujan Prize, University of Madras

== Places ==
- Ramanujan IT City, Chennai
- Ramanujan Math Park, Chittoor, Andhra Pradesh, India
