= Bertram Martin Wilson =

English mathematician (1896–1935)

Prof Bertram Martin Wilson FRSE (14 November 1896, London – 18 March 1935, Dundee, Scotland) was an English mathematician, remembered primarily as a co-editor, along with G. H. Hardy and P. V. Seshu Aiyar, of Srinivasa Ramanujan's Collected Papers. (It seems probable that Wilson did not know about Ramanujan's lost notebook, which was probably passed by G. H. Hardy to G. N. Watson some years after Wilson's death.)

== Life ==
He was born in London on 14 November 1896 the son of Rev Alfred Henry Wilson and his wife, Ellen Elizabeth Vincent.

Wilson was educated at King Edward's School, Birmingham and then studied mathematics at Trinity College, Cambridge, graduating MA. In 1920 he was appointed as a lecturer in mathematics at the University of Liverpool, and was promoted to Senior Lecturer in 1926. He remained there for slightly more than thirteen years, working under three professors, Frank Stanton Carey (1860–1928), J. C. Burkhill, and E. C. Titchmarsh. In 1933 Wilson was appointed Professor of Pure and Applied Mathematics at University College, Dundee as successor to John Edward Aloysius Steggall, who retired.

His early interests in mathematical analysis are shown in some dozen original papers, published between 1919 and 1924, mainly on the theory of numbers and on integral equations and orthogonal functions, but these were only a small part of his total contribution to mathematics. Subsequently, most of his attention was directed to the study of the remarkable Indian mathematician Srinivasa Ramanujan: he was one of the editors of the Collected Papers, published in 1927, and at the time of his death was still occupied, again as joint editor, in the much greater task of annotating Ramanujan's note-books. He was also on the editorial board of the new Compositio Mathematica and contributed many reviews to the Fortschritte.

Sometime in the late 1920s, G. N. Watson and B. M. Wilson began the task of editing Ramanujan's notebooks. The second notebook, being a revised, enlarged edition of the first, was their primary focus. Wilson was assigned Chapters 2–14, and Watson was to examine Chapters 15–21. Wilson devoted his efforts to this task until 1935, when he died from an infection at the early age of 38. Watson wrote over 30 papers inspired by the notebooks before his interest evidently waned in the late 1930s. Thus, the project was never completed.

Wilson was elected on 5 March 1934 a Fellow of the Royal Society of Edinburgh. His proposers were Sir Edmund Taylor Whittaker, James Hartley Ashworth, Nicholas Lightfoot and Edward Thomas Copson.

In 1934 he gave a talk Ramanujan's Note-Books and their Place in Modern Mathematics at the third Colloquium of the Edinburgh Mathematical Society at the University of St Andrews.

Wilson died on 18 March 1935 following a brief illness.

== Family ==
In 1930 he married Margaret Fancourt Mitchell.

== Subsequent history for Ramanujan's Notebooks ==
G. N. Watson and B. M. Wilson never completed their project of editing Ramanujan's notebooks (not including the "lost" notebook), but Bruce C. Berndt completed their project in a 5-volume publication Ramanujan's Notebooks, Parts I—V. The following quote refers to the three notebooks involved in Watson and Wilson's project:

.... Ramanujan left three notebooks. The first notebook, totaling 351 pages, contains 16 chapters of loosely organized material with the remainder unorganized. In the organized part, which ends on page 263 ..., Ramanujan wrote on only one side of the paper. Shortly thereafter, Ramanujan began to write on both sides of the page and then returned to the unused reverse sides to record additional material, so that only about 20 of 351 pages are actually blank.

The second notebook is a revised enlargement of the first and was probably composed during the nine months that Ramanujan held a scholarship at the University of Madras prior to his departure from England. This notebook contains 21 chapters, comprising 256 pages, followed by 100 pages of miscellaneous material.

The third short notebook contains 33 pages of miscellaneous material.

Berndt benefited substantially from Wilson's considerable efforts in editing Ramanujan's second notebook. Because some journals require the permission of each author when an article is to be published, for some of Berndt's work he was not permitted to put Wilson or Watson as a coauthor. However, Berndt published several articles with Wilson as a coauthor.

== Selected publications ==
- Wilson, B. M. (1923). "Proofs of some formulae enunciated by Ramanujan". Proceedings of the London Mathematical Society. 2. 21 (1): 235–255. doi:10.1112/plms/s2-21.1.235.
- Wilson, B. M. (1923). "On the manner of divergence of the Legendre series of an integrable function". Proceedings of the London Mathematical Society. 2. 21 (1): 389–400. doi:10.1112/plms/s2-21.1.389.
- Wilson, B. M. (1924). "An Application of Pfeiffer's Method to a Problem of Hardy and Littlewood". Proceedings of the London Mathematical Society. 2. 22 (1): 248–253. doi:10.1112/plms/s2-22.1.248.
- Wilson, B. M. (1926). "On Pseudo-Orthogonal Systems of Functions Arising as Solutions of an Integral Equation". Proceedings of the London Mathematical Society. 2. 25 (1): 59–102. doi:10.1112/plms/s2-25.1.59.
- Wilson, B. M. (1930). "S. Ramanujan". The Mathematical Gazette. 15 (207): 89–94. doi:10.2307/3607411. JSTOR 3607411. S2CID 250432530.
