= Hardy–Ramanujan Journal =

- Discipline: Number Theory
- Language: English

Standard abbreviations
- ISO 4: Hardy–Ramanujan J.
- MathSciNet: Hardy-Ramanujan J.

Indexing
- OCLC no.: 644449055

Links
- Journal homepage

The Hardy–Ramanujan Journal is a mathematics journal covering prime numbers, Diophantine equations, and transcendental numbers. It is named for G. H. Hardy and Srinivasa Ramanujan. Together with the Ramanujan Journal and the Journal of the Ramanujan Mathematical Society, it is one of three journals named after Ramanujan.

It was established in 1978 by R. Balasubramanian and K. Ramachandra and is published once a year on Ramanujan's birthday December 22. It is indexed in MathSciNet.

Both Balasubramanian and Ramachandra are respected mathematicians and accomplished a great deal in the field of mathematics. They both also focused their mathematical careers on number theory. Most importantly, they were both inspired by Srinivasa Ramanujan, which led them to the creation of the Hardy–Ramanujan Journal. Before Ramachandra's death, the two would publish a new journal almost every year on Ramanujan's birthday, December 22. However, after that time a decision was made to continue the journal by a new team of editors. These editors consisted of people who shared the same passion as Ramachandra and Balasubramanian and contributed to the journal in the past. The goal of the journal remains the same.
