= Bruce C. Berndt =

American mathematician (born 1939)

Bruce Carl Berndt
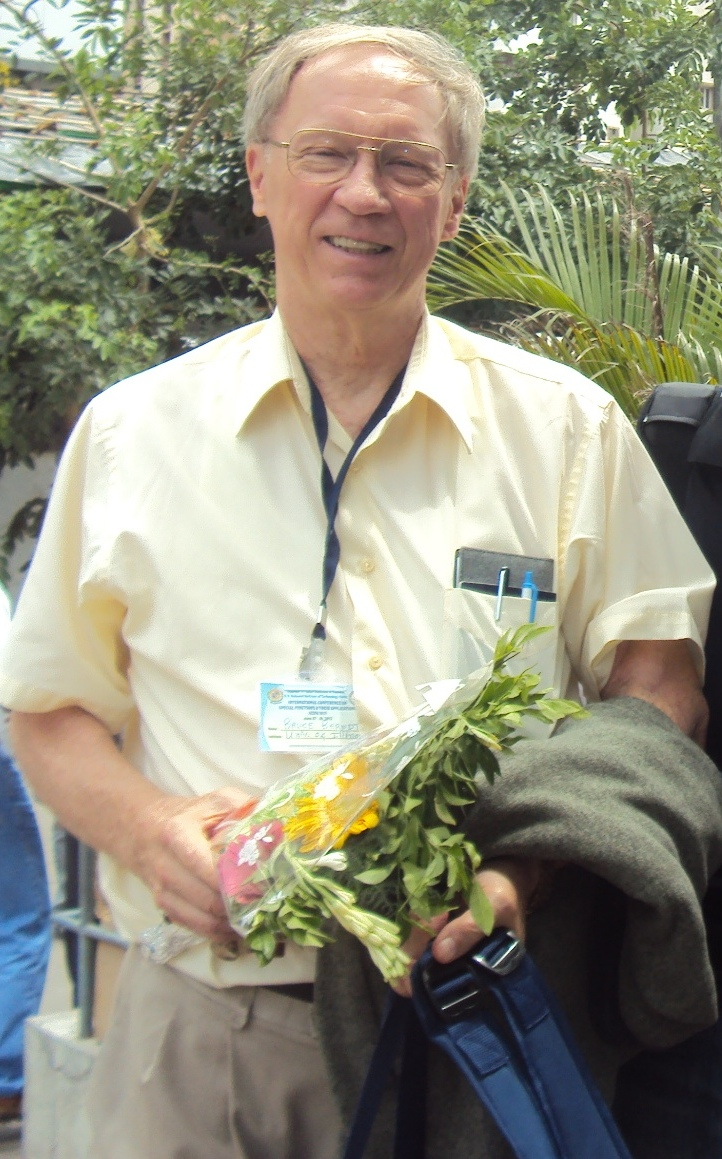
- Born: March 13, 1939 (age 87); St. Joseph, Michigan, U.S.
- Education: Albion College (BA); University of Wisconsin–Madison (MA, PhD)
- Known for: Ramanujan's notebooks
- Scientific career
- Fields: Analysis

Bruce Carl Berndt (born March 13, 1939) is an American mathematician. Berndt attended college at Albion College, graduating in 1961, where he also ran track. He received his master's and doctoral degrees from the University of Wisconsin–Madison. He lectured for a year at the University of Glasgow and then, in 1967, was appointed an assistant professor at the University of Illinois at Urbana-Champaign, where he has remained since. In 1973–74, he was a visiting scholar at the Institute for Advanced Study in Princeton. He is currently (as of 2006) Michio Suzuki Distinguished Research Professor of Mathematics at the University of Illinois.

Berndt is an analytic number theorist who is known for his work explicating the discoveries of Srinivasa Ramanujan. He is a coordinating editor of The Ramanujan Journal and, in 1996, received an expository Steele Prize from the American Mathematical Society for his work editing Ramanujan's Notebooks. A Lester R. Ford Award was given to Berndt, with Gert Almkvist, in 1989 and to Berndt, with S. Bhargava, in 1994.

In 2012, he became a fellow of the American Mathematical Society. In December 2012, he received an honorary doctorate from SASTRA University in Kumbakonam, India.

== Selected publications ==
- Ramanujan: Letters and Commentary (History of Mathematics, V. 9), by Bruce C. Berndt and Robert A. Rankin (American Mathematical Society, 1995, ISBN 0-8218-0287-9)
- Ramanujan: Essays and Surveys (History of Mathematics, V. 22), by Bruce C. Berndt and Robert A. Rankin (American Mathematical Society, 2001, ISBN 0-8218-2624-7)
- The Continued Fractions Found in the Unorganized Portions of Ramanujan's Notebooks (Memoirs of the American Mathematical Society), by Bruce C. Berndt, L. Jacobsen, R. L. Lamphere, George E. Andrews (Editor), Srinivasa Ramanujan Aiyangar (Editor) (American Mathematical Society, 1993, ISBN 0-8218-2538-0)
- Ramanujan's Notebooks, Part I, by Bruce C. Berndt (Springer, 1985, ISBN 0-387-96110-0)
- Ramanujan's Notebooks, Part II, by Bruce C. Berndt (Springer, 1999, ISBN 0-387-96794-X)
- Ramanujan's Notebooks, Part III, by Bruce C. Berndt (Springer, 2004, ISBN 0-387-97503-9)
- Ramanujan's Notebooks, Part IV, by Bruce C. Berndt (Springer, 1993, ISBN 0-387-94109-6)
- Ramanujan's Notebooks, Part V, by Bruce C. Berndt (Springer, 2005, ISBN 0-387-94941-0)
- Ramanujan's Lost Notebook, Part I, by George Andrews and Bruce C. Berndt (Springer, 2005, ISBN 0-387-25529-X)
- Ramanujan's Lost Notebook, Part II, George E. Andrews, Bruce C. Berndt (Springer, 2008, ISBN 978-0-387-77765-8)
- Ramanujan's Lost Notebook: Part III, George E. Andrews, Bruce C. Berndt (Springer, 2012, ISBN 978-1-4614-3809-0)
- Ramanujan's Lost Notebook: Part IV, George E. Andrews, Bruce C. Berndt (Springer, 2013, ISBN 978-1-4614-4080-2)
- Ramanujan's Lost Notebook: Part V, George E. Andrews, Bruce C. Berndt (Springer, 2018, ISBN 978-3-319-77834-1)
- Number Theory in the Spirit of Ramanujan by Bruce C. Berndt (American Mathematical Society, 2006, ISBN 0-8218-4178-5)
- Number Theory and Modular Forms: Papers in Memory of Robert A. Rankin (Developments in Mathematics), by Bruce Berndt (Editor), Ken Ono (Editor) (Springer, 2003, ISBN 1-4020-7615-0)

== See also ==
- Ramanujan's lost notebook
