= Government Arts College, Kumbakonam =

Autonomous college in Kumbakonam in Tamil Nadu, India

Government Arts College (Autonomous)
- Kumbakonam Govt College
- Motto: மெய்ப்பொருள் கல்வி
- Motto in English: MEIPORUL KALVI
- Type: Public
- Established: 19 October 1854
- Affiliations: Bharathidasan University
- Principal: Dr. M.Govindaraju
- Location: Kumbakonam, Tamil Nadu, India; 10.970819°N 79.381515°E
- Website: https://www.gacakum.ac.in

The Government Arts College, previously known as the Government Arts College for Men, is an autonomous college based in the town of Kumbakonam in Tamil Nadu, India. This college is functioning under Bharathidasan University. Dr. M. Selvam is the vice-chancellor of the university. Dr. K. Duraiarasan has been the principal of this college since 2020. He is a former examination control officer of Bharathidasan University and assistant director of Tamil Nadu Government's Tamil Internet Education Institute. The college is ranked 71st among colleges in India by the National Institutional Ranking Framework (NIRF) in 2025.

== History ==
This college was started as a Provincial School in October 1854 even before the establishment of the Madras University. It became one of the oldest educational institutions established in the Madras Presidency of British India. In 1864, it was raised to the status of second-grade college with the affiliated subjects Mathematics, History and Philosophy under the university.

== Academic programmes ==
The college offers undergraduates and postgraduate programmes in arts and science affiliated to the Bharathidasan University. It has been accredited by NAAC with an A Grade.

== Notable alumni ==
Notable alumni include Srinivasa Ramanujan, V. S. Srinivasa Sastri, P. S. Sivaswami Iyer, U.V.Swaminatha Iyer, Robert–Rajasekar, and S. Shankar

== Miniature sculptures in the campus ==
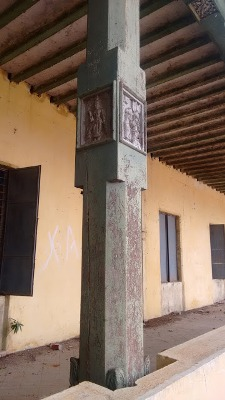
Sculptures on four sides of the pillar

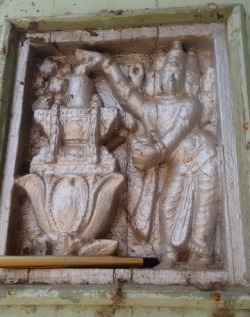
Brahma worshipping Linga

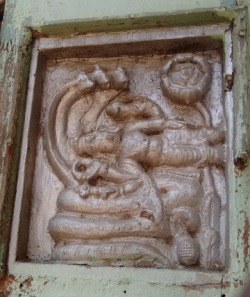
Vishnu reclining on snake

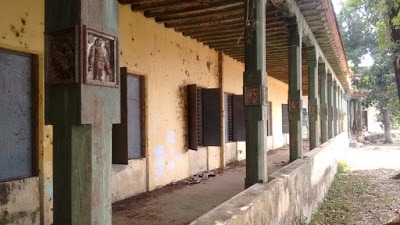
Row of pillars

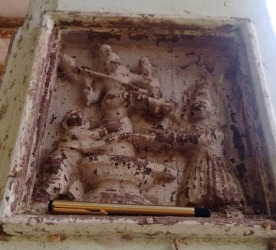
Shiva coming out of Linga to save Markandeya

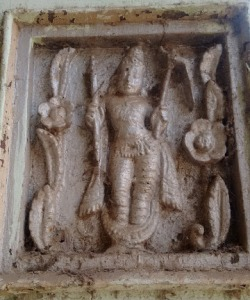
Another sculpture in standing posture

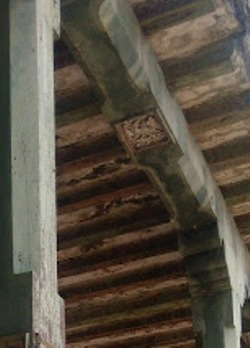
Sculptures in the panel
