= S. L. Loney =

British mathematician

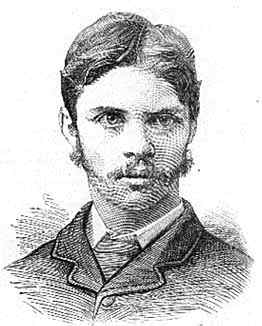
- Born: March 16, 1860; Chevithorne, Devon, England
- Died: May 16, 1939 (aged 79); Richmond, London
- Education: Sidney Sussex College, Cambridge
- Occupations: Professor, author
- Organization: Royal Holloway College

Sydney Luxton Loney, M.A. (16 March 1860 – 16 May 1939) was Professor of Mathematics at Royal Holloway College, Egham, Surrey and a Fellow of Sidney Sussex College, Cambridge. He authored several mathematics textbooks, many of which have gone into multiple reprints over the years. He is also known as an early influence on Srinivasa Ramanujan.

Loney began his schooling at Maidstone Grammar School, then moved to Tonbridge School, where his aptitude for mathematics first became evident. In 1882 he graduated B.A. from Sidney Sussex College, Cambridge as 3rd Wrangler, placing him third in the notoriously rigorous Mathematical Tripos.

After Cambridge, Loney was elected a Fellow of Sidney Sussex College from 1885 to 1891, during which time he deepened his engagement with both teaching and research. In 1888 he accepted the Chair of Mathematics at Royal Holloway College (University of London), a position he held until his retirement in 1920. Beyond his professorship, Loney was active in university governance: he became a Senator of the University of London in 1905, a Trustee and Governor of Royal Holloway in 1920, Chairman of the University’s Convocation in 1923, and Deputy Chairman of its Court in 1929. Locally, he served on the Surrey County Education Committee from 1909 to 1937, was Mayor of Richmond in 1920–1921, and acted as a Justice of the Peace, demonstrating a commitment to public service beyond academia.

Loney’s Plane Trigonometry and The Elements of Coordinate Geometry are still used in Indian senior‑high curricula and engineering‑entrance coaching. In 1899, an eleven‑year‑old Srinivasa Ramanujan borrowed Plane Trigonometry, his first substantial piece of formal mathematics outside his school syllabus, working through it rigorously over two years.

== Bibliography ==
- Loney, SL (1889), A treatise on elementary dynamics, Cambridge: University Press, JFM 21.0845.01
- Loney, SL (1893), "Mechanics and hydrostatics for beginners", Nature, 47 (1219), Cambridge: University Press: 437, Bibcode:1893Natur..47..437G, doi:10.1038/047437b0, JFM 25.1331.02, S2CID 3983398
- Loney, SL (1895), The elements of coordinate geometry, London: Macmillan and Co., JFM 26.0640.01
- Loney, SL (1897), The elements of statics and dynamics, Cambridge: University Press, JFM 23.0903.08
- Loney, SL (1903), A Shilling Arithmetic, London: Macmillan and Co.
- Loney, SL (1909), An elementary treatise on the dynamics of a particle and of rigid bodies, Cambridge: University Press, JFM 21.0845.02
- Loney, SL (1912), An elementary treatise on statics, Cambridge: University Press, JFM 43.0799.06
- Loney, SL (1912), Plane Trigonometry, Cambridge: University Press, JFM 25.0892.12

== Sources ==
- Harold Simpson (1939), "Sidney Luxton Loney", J. London Math. Soc., s1-14 (3): 240, doi:10.1112/jlms/s1-14.3.240
- Higgins, E. C. (17 June 1939), "Prof. S. L. Loney", Nature, 143 (3633): 1011–1012, Bibcode:1939Natur.143.1011H, doi:10.1038/1431011a0
