= Edward Burns Ross =

Scottish mathematician (1881–1947)

Edward Burns Ross FRSE (28 September 1881 – 11 January 1947) was a 20th-century Scottish mathematician who served as a professor of mathematics at the Madras Christian College.

== Life ==
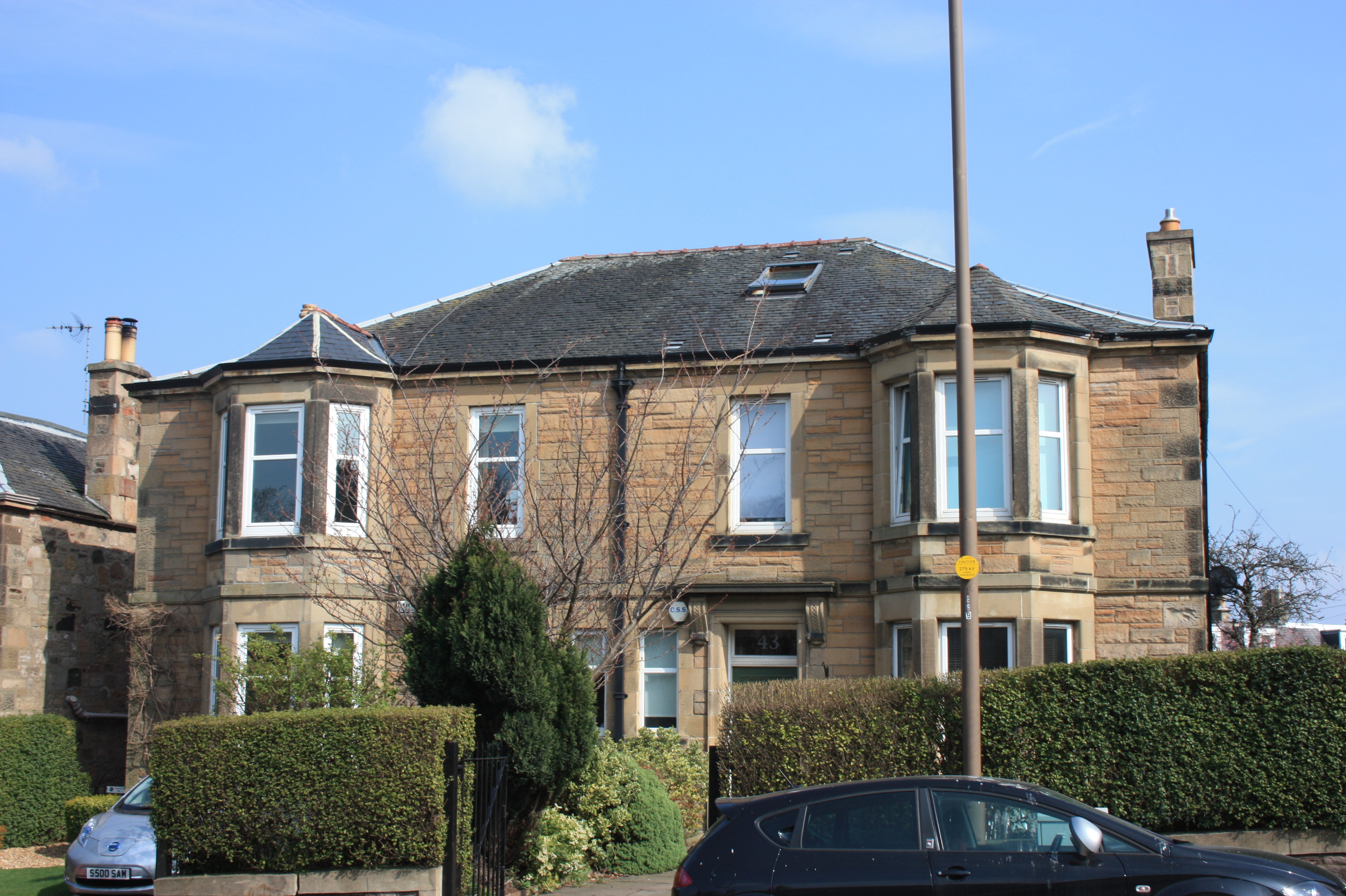
41 Liberton Brae, Edinburgh (left)

Ross was born on 28 September 1881 in Maud, Aberdeenshire the son of Ann and William Ross, an Inland Revenue supervisor. Following his father's death in 1887, his school teacher mother moved the family to Edinburgh in 1888. He was then educated at George Watson's School and was school dux in 1898. He studied mathematics and physics at the University of Edinburgh graduating with an MA in 1902. He then continued with postgraduate studies, using a Ferguson Scholarship, in Mathematical Tripos (seventh wrangler, 1904) at the University of Cambridge, gaining a further MA in 1906.

In 1906, he became assistant to Karl Pearson at University College, London staying for one academic year, and in 1907 obtained a post at Madras Christian College in India. His pupils included S. R. Ranganathan who later dedicated a book to him. Ross was a friend of G.H. Hardy and took an interest in the work of Srinivasa Ramanujam.

In 1921 he was elected a Fellow of the Royal Society of Edinburgh. His proposers were Sir Edmund Taylor Whittaker, Ellice Horsburgh, Cargill Gilston Knott and David Gibb.

He retired due to ill-health in 1932 and went to live with his sisters at 41 Liberton Brae in south Edinburgh.

He died on 11 January 1947.
