= Modular equation =

Type of algebraic equation

In mathematics, a modular equation is an algebraic equation satisfied by moduli, in the sense of moduli problems. That is, given a number of functions on a moduli space, a modular equation is an equation holding between them, or in other words an identity for moduli.

The most frequent use of the term modular equation is in relation to the moduli problem for elliptic curves. In that case the moduli space itself is of dimension one. That implies that any two rational functions F and G, in the function field of the modular curve, will satisfy a modular equation P(F,G) = 0 with P a non-zero polynomial of two variables over the complex numbers. For suitable non-degenerate choice of F and G, the equation P(X,Y) = 0 will actually define the modular curve.

This can be qualified by saying that P, in the worst case, will be of high degree and the plane curve it defines will have singular points; and the coefficients of P may be very large numbers. Further, the 'cusps' of the moduli problem, which are the points of the modular curve not corresponding to honest elliptic curves but degenerate cases, may be difficult to read off from knowledge of P.

In that sense a modular equation becomes the equation of a modular curve. Such equations first arose in the theory of multiplication of elliptic functions (geometrically, the n^{2}-fold covering map from a 2-torus to itself given by the mapping x → n·x on the underlying group) expressed in terms of complex analysis.

== See also ==
- Modular lambda function
- Ramanujan's lost notebook
