= Ramanujan IT City =

Coordinates: 12°59′27″N 80°14′49″E

Ramanujan IT City (TRIL)
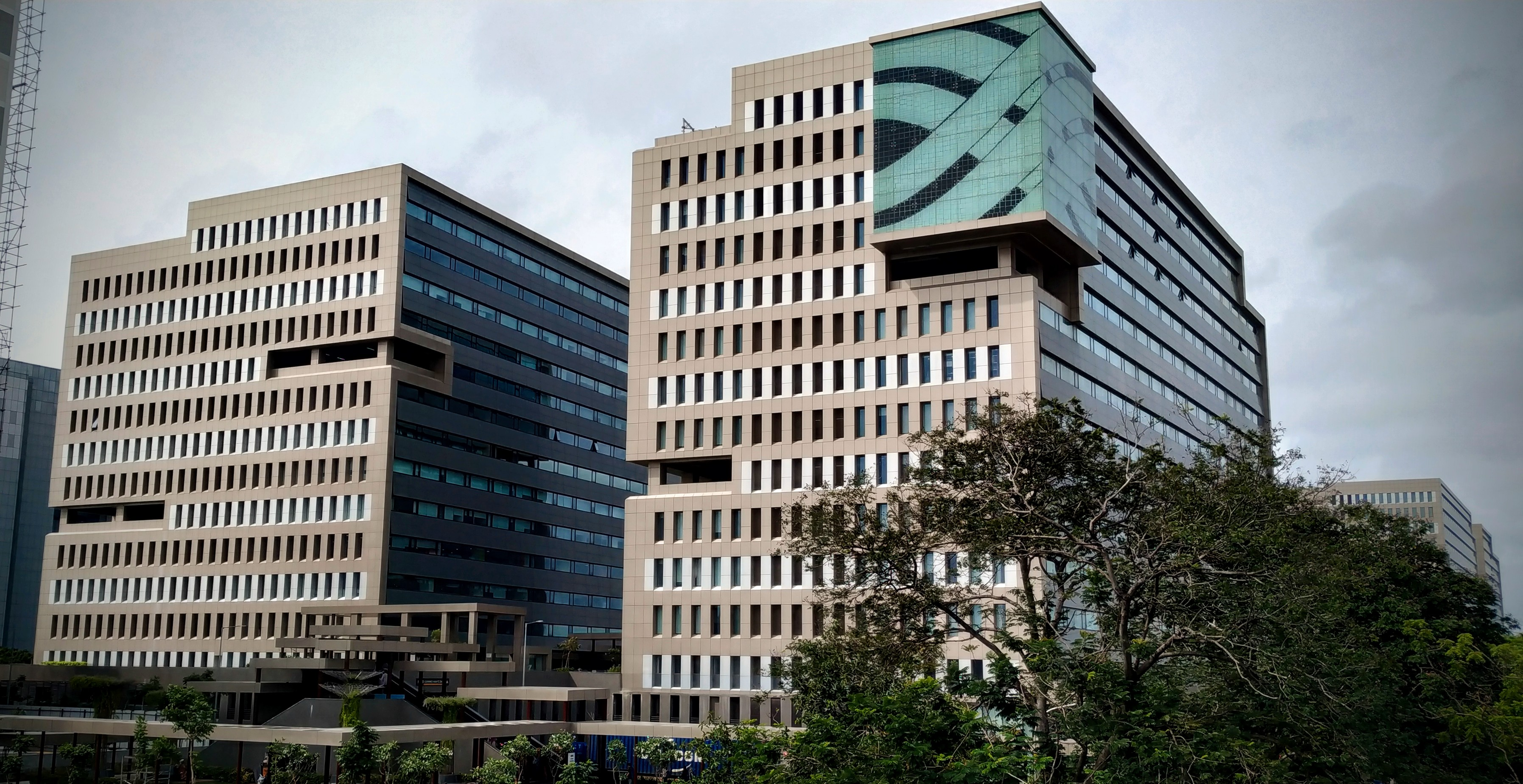
- Interactive map of the Ramanujan IT City (TRIL) area

General information
- Type: Information Technology Park
- Location: Taramani, Chennai, India, Rajiv Gandhi Salai, Taramani, Chennai, Tamil Nadu 600 113, India
- Cost: US$230 million

Height
- Roof: 60 m (200 ft)
- Top floor: 12

Technical details
- Floor count: 13
- Floor area: 4,500,000 sq ft (420,000 m^{2})

Design and construction
- Architects: Skidmore, Owings and Merill (SOM) (New York City, USA)
- Developer: TIDCO, Tata Realty and Infrastructure Limited and Indian Hotels Company Limited
- Main contractor: Leighton Welspun (Australia)

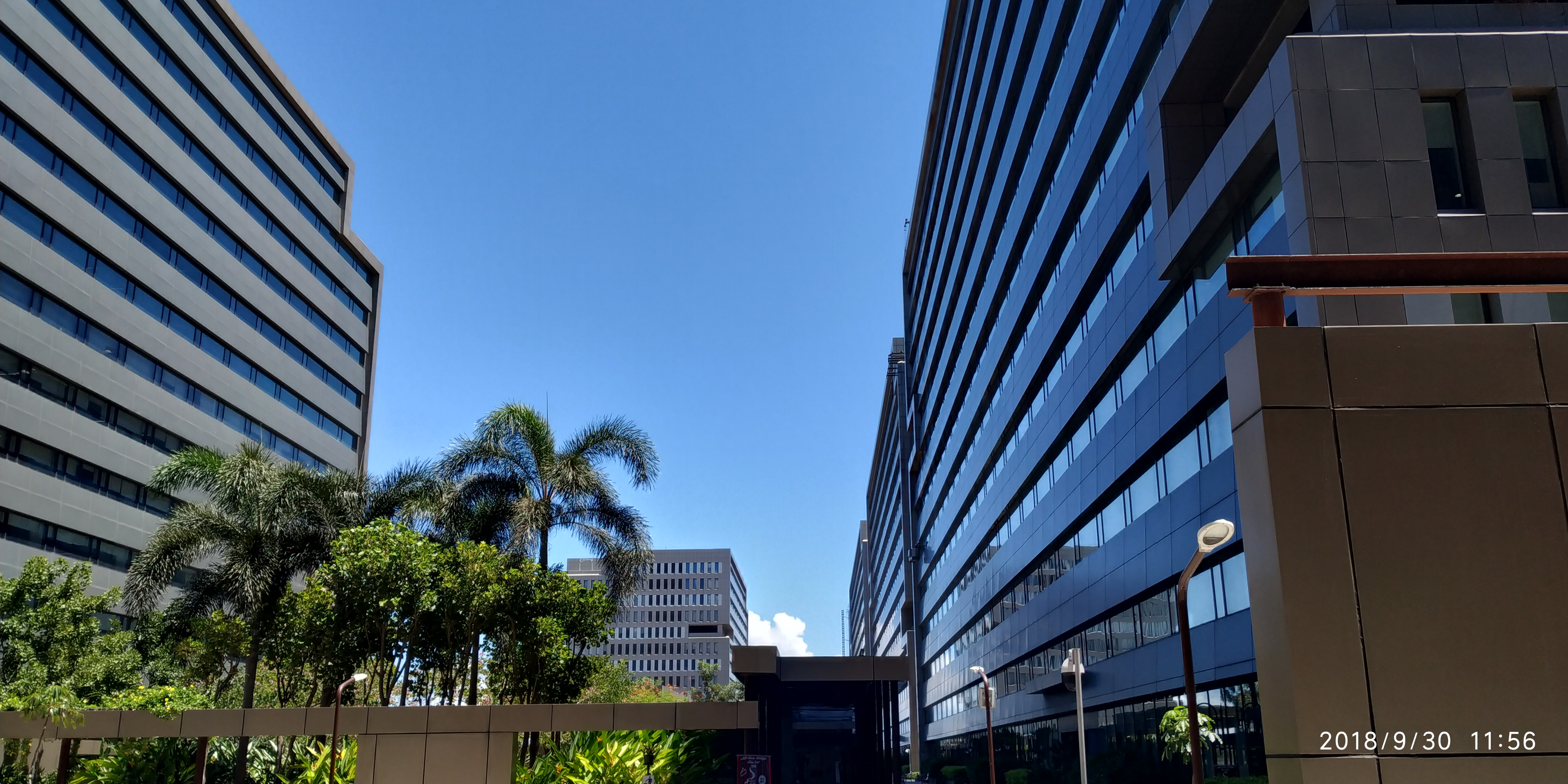
Ramanujan IT park, Chennai

Ramanujan IT City is an information technology (IT) special economic zone (SEZ) situated in Chennai, India. Named after the Indian Mathematician Srinivasa Ramanujan, it is a joint venture of Tata Realty and Infrastructure Limited (TRIL), Indian Hotels Company Limited (IHCL) and Tamil Nadu Industrial Development Corporation (TIDCO). Situated next to the Tidel Park, it is being developed in a land measuring 25 acres with two zones with a total built-up area of 5.7 million sq ft. including 4.5 million sq ft of office space.

== History ==
The initial works comprising demolition of existing buildings, site clearing and commencement of bulk excavation and piling works began in December 2008 by Leighton India. Construction on the new building structure commenced in June 2009.

== The project ==
The project is located on a 25-acre site situated along the Old Mamallapuram Road opposite the Thiruvanmiyur MRTS Railway Station, north of the Taramani IT corridor where the majority of the city's IT sector is housed. The project is being developed at a cost of ₹ 35,000 million within a special economic zone and comprises two distinct elements, namely, a processing zone and a non-processing zone.

Processing zone

The processing zone is the IT portion of the development consisting of four office buildings of approximately 60 m in height. The buildings are arranged around central courtyards located at ground and at the podium level. The courtyards serve as the centre of activity for the IT complex, providing links between the various amenity functions.

The buildings are being built in 6 blocks with five levels of car parking, including three levels of basement car parking along with additional multi-level car parking, and 13 floors, with a total area of 4.5 million sq ft. The towers are named Hardy Tower, Carr Tower, Neville Tower, Cambridge Tower and Littlewood Tower, in the memories of G. H. Hardy, G. S. Carr, Eric Harold Neville and John Edensor Littlewood respectively. The project has obtained Green Building certification (as per LEED Gold Guidelines—Pre-certified) and IMS certification. Utility buildings are also being constructed to support the IT facilities. The buildings have 8-m-high entrance lobbies, and each floor has floor-plates ranging from 50,000 sq ft to 100,000 sq ft in various blocks, with a floor-to-floor height of 3.75 m.

Non-processing zone

The non-processing zone consists of a mixed-use development consisting of a convention centre, retail, residential, hospitality and entertainment facilities along with below-ground car parking.
