= Ramanujan–Soldner constant =

Mathematical constant

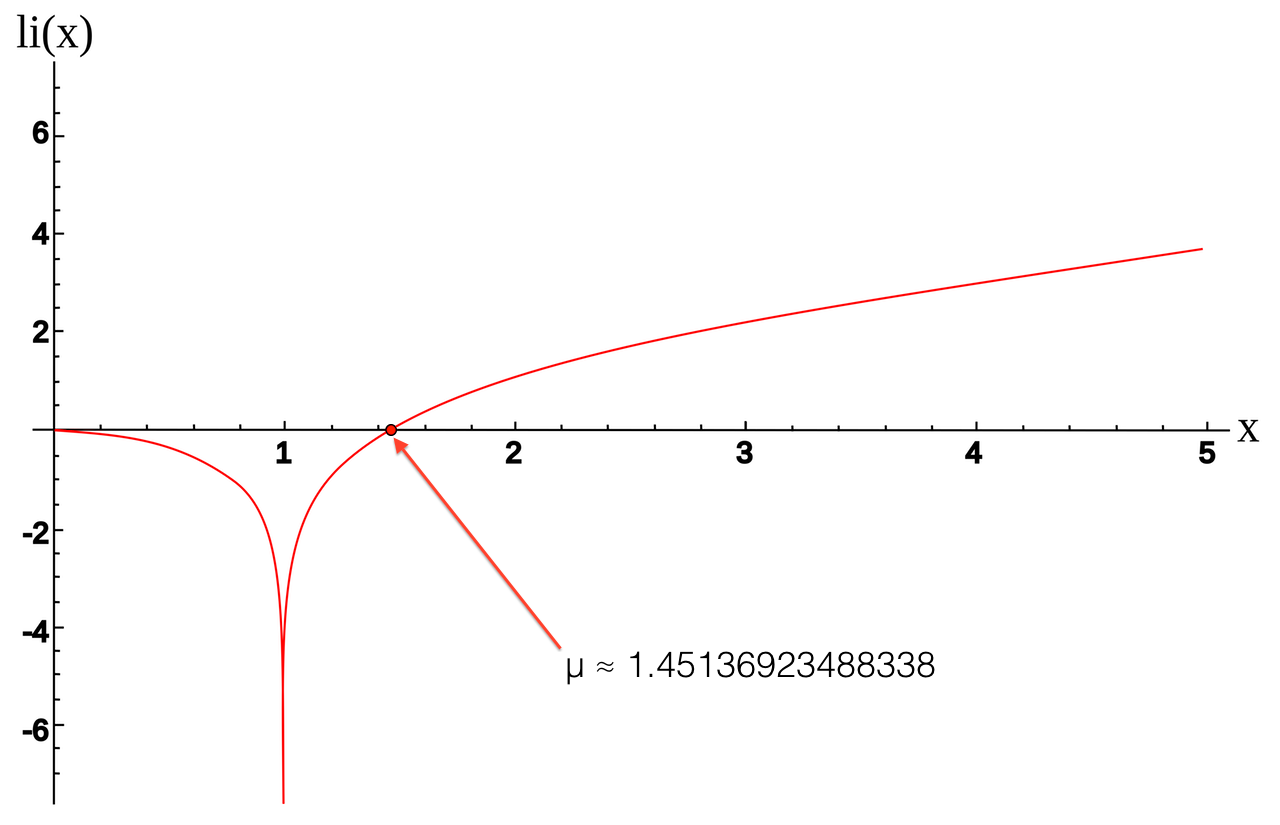
Ramanujan–Soldner constant as seen on the logarithmic integral function.

In mathematics, the Ramanujan–Soldner constant is a mathematical constant defined as the unique positive zero of the logarithmic integral function. It is named after Srinivasa Ramanujan and Johann Georg von Soldner.

Its value is approximately μ ≈ 1.45136923488338105028396848589202744949303228… (sequence A070769 in the OEIS)

Since the logarithmic integral is defined by

$$\mathrm{li}(x) = \int_0^x \frac{dt}{\ln t},$$

then using $\mathrm{li}(\mu) = 0,$ we have

$$\mathrm{li}(x)\;=\;\mathrm{li}(x) - \mathrm{li}(\mu) = \int_0^x \frac{dt}{\ln t} - \int_0^{\mu} \frac{dt}{\ln t} = \int_{\mu}^x \frac{dt}{\ln t},$$

thus easing calculation for numbers greater than μ. Also, since the exponential integral function satisfies the equation

$$\mathrm{li}(x)\;=\;\mathrm{Ei}(\ln{x}),$$

the only positive zero of the exponential integral occurs at the natural logarithm of the Ramanujan–Soldner constant, whose value is approximately ln(μ) ≈ 0.372507410781366634461991866… (sequence A091723 in the OEIS)
