= Ramanujan prime =

Prime fulfilling an inequality related to the prime-counting function

In mathematics, a Ramanujan prime is a prime number that satisfies a result proven by Srinivasa Ramanujan relating to the prime-counting function.

== Origins and definition ==
In 1919, Ramanujan published a new proof of Bertrand's postulate which, as he notes, was first proved by Chebyshev. At the end of the two-page published paper, Ramanujan derived a generalized result, and that is:

$\pi(x) - \pi\left( \frac x 2 \right) \ge 1,2,3,4,5,\ldots \text{ for all } x \ge 2, 11, 17, 29, 41, \ldots \text{ respectively}$ OEIS: A104272

where $\pi(x)$ is the prime-counting function, equal to the number of primes less than or equal to x.

The converse of this result is the definition of Ramanujan primes:

The nth Ramanujan prime is the least integer R_{n} for which $\pi(x) - \pi(x/2) \ge n,$ for all x ≥ R_{n}. In other words: Ramanujan primes are the least integers R_{n} for which there are at least n primes between x and x/2 for all x ≥ R_{n}.

The first five Ramanujan primes are thus 2, 11, 17, 29, and 41.

Note that the integer R_{n} is necessarily a prime number: $\pi(x) - \pi(x/2)$ and, hence, $\pi(x)$ must increase by obtaining another prime at x = R_{n}. Since $\pi(x) - \pi(x/2)$ can increase by at most 1,

$$\pi(R_n) - \pi\left( \frac{R_n} 2 \right) = n.$$

== Bounds and an asymptotic formula ==
For all $n \geq 1$, the bounds

$$2n\ln2n < R_n < 4n\ln4n$$

hold. If $n > 1$, then also

$$p_{2n} < R_n < p_{3n}$$

where p_{n} is the nth prime number.

As n tends to infinity, R_{n} is asymptotic to the 2nth prime, i.e.,

R_{n} ~ p_{2n} (n → ∞).

All these results were proved by Sondow (2009), except for the upper bound R_{n} < p_{3n} which was conjectured by him and proved by Laishram (2010). The bound was improved by Sondow, Nicholson, and Noe (2011) to

$$R_n \le \frac{41}{47} \ p_{3n}$$

which is the optimal form of R_{n} ≤ c·p_{3n} since it is an equality for n = 5.
