= Srinivasa Ramanujan =

Indian mathematician (1887–1920)

Srinivasa Ramanujan FRS
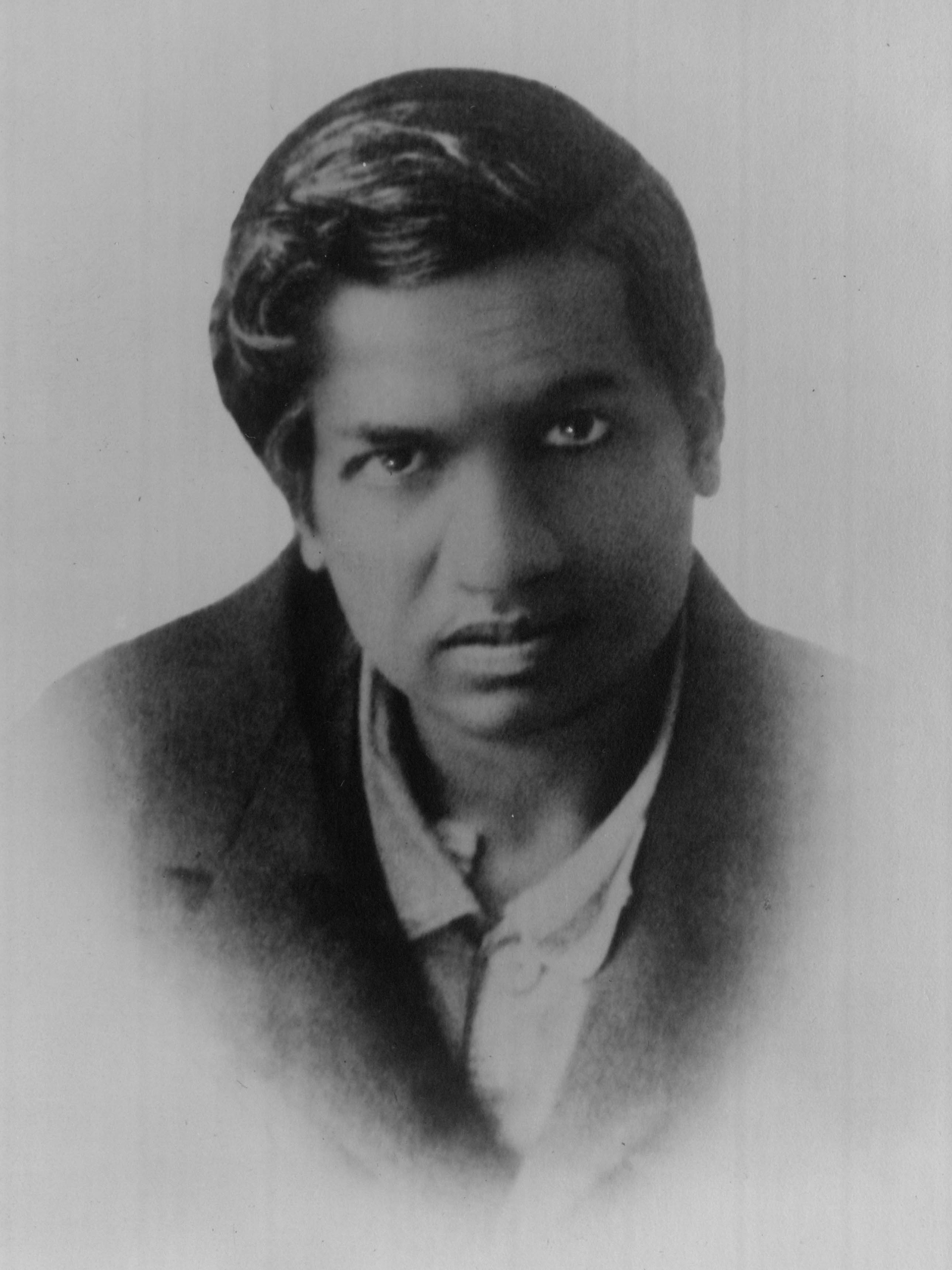
- Ramanujan in 1913
- Born: Srinivasa Ramanujan Iyengar; 22 December 1887; Erode, Madras Presidency, British Raj
- Died: 26 April 1920 (aged 32); Madras, Madras Presidency, British Raj
- Education: Government Arts College; Pachaiyappa's College; Trinity College, Cambridge (BA)
- Known for: Ramanujan's sum; Landau–Ramanujan constant; Mock theta functions; Ramanujan's congruences; Ramanujan conjecture; Ramanujan prime; Ramanujan–Soldner constant; Ramanujan theta function; Rogers–Ramanujan identities; Ramanujan's master theorem; Hardy–Ramanujan asymptotic formula; Ramanujan–Sato series
- Awards: Fellow of the Royal Society (1918)
- Scientific career
- Fields: Mathematics
- Workplaces: University of Cambridge
- Thesis: Highly Composite Numbers (1916)
- Academic advisors: G. H. Hardy; J. E. Littlewood

Srinivasa Ramanujan Iyengar (Note: Tamil: ஶ்ரீநிவாஸ ராமாநுஜையங்கார், romanized: Śrīnivāsa Rāmānujaiyaṅgār) (22 December 1887 – 26 April 1920) was an Indian mathematician who worked during the early 20th century. He made substantial contributions to mathematical analysis, number theory, infinite series, and continued fractions, including solutions to mathematical problems then considered unsolvable.

Ramanujan initially developed his own mathematical research in isolation. According to Hans Eysenck, "he tried to interest the leading professional mathematicians in his work, but failed for the most part. What he had to show them was too novel, too unfamiliar, and additionally presented in unusual ways; they could not be bothered." Seeking mathematicians who could better understand his work, in 1913 he began a mail correspondence with the English mathematician G. H. Hardy at the University of Cambridge. Recognising Ramanujan's work as extraordinary, Hardy arranged for him to travel to Cambridge. In his notes, Hardy commented that Ramanujan had produced groundbreaking new theorems, including some that "defeated me completely; I had never seen anything in the least like them before", and some recently proven but highly advanced results.

Throughout his life, Ramanujan independently compiled nearly 3,900 results (mostly identities and equations). Many were completely novel; his original and highly unconventional results, such as the Ramanujan prime, the Ramanujan theta function, partition formulae and mock theta functions, have opened entire new areas of work and inspired further research. Of his thousands of results, most have been proven correct. The Ramanujan Journal, a scientific journal, was established to publish work in all areas of mathematics influenced by Ramanujan, and his notebooks—containing summaries of his published and unpublished results—have been analysed and studied for decades since his death as a source of new mathematical ideas. As late as 2012, researchers continued to discover that mere comments in his writings about "simple properties" and "similar outputs" for certain findings were themselves profound and subtle number theory results that remained unsuspected until nearly a century after his death. He became one of the youngest Fellows of the Royal Society and only the second Indian member, and the first Indian to be elected a Fellow of Trinity College, Cambridge.

In 1919, ill health—now believed to have been hepatic amoebiasis (a complication from episodes of dysentery many years previously)—compelled Ramanujan's return to India, where he died in 1920 at the age of 32. His last letters to Hardy, written in January 1920, show that he was still continuing to produce new mathematical ideas and theorems. His "lost notebook", containing discoveries from the last year of his life, caused great excitement among mathematicians when it was rediscovered in 1976.

== Early life ==
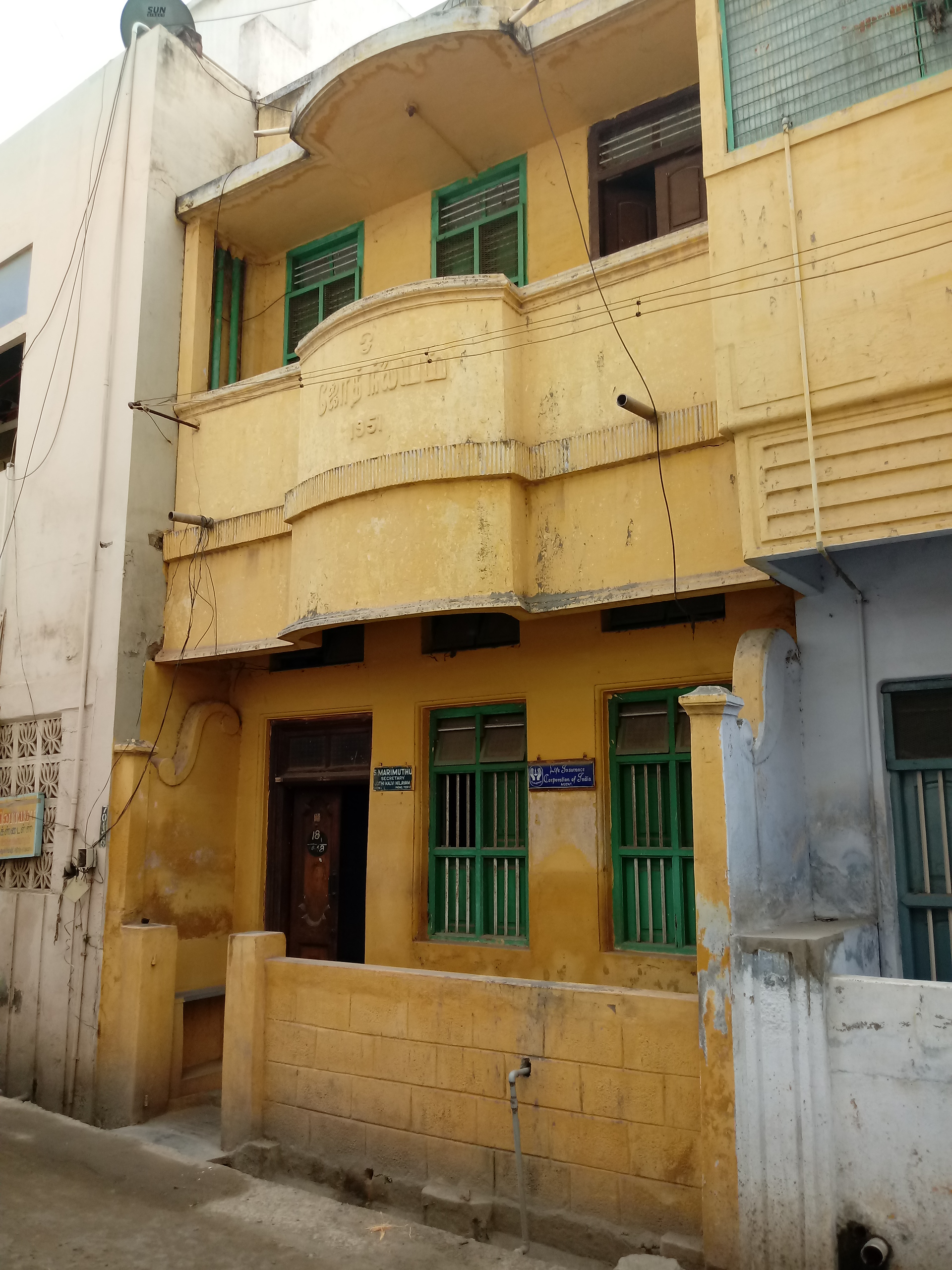
Ramanujan's birthplace was in British-ruled India on 18 Alahiri Street, Erode, modern Tamil Nadu

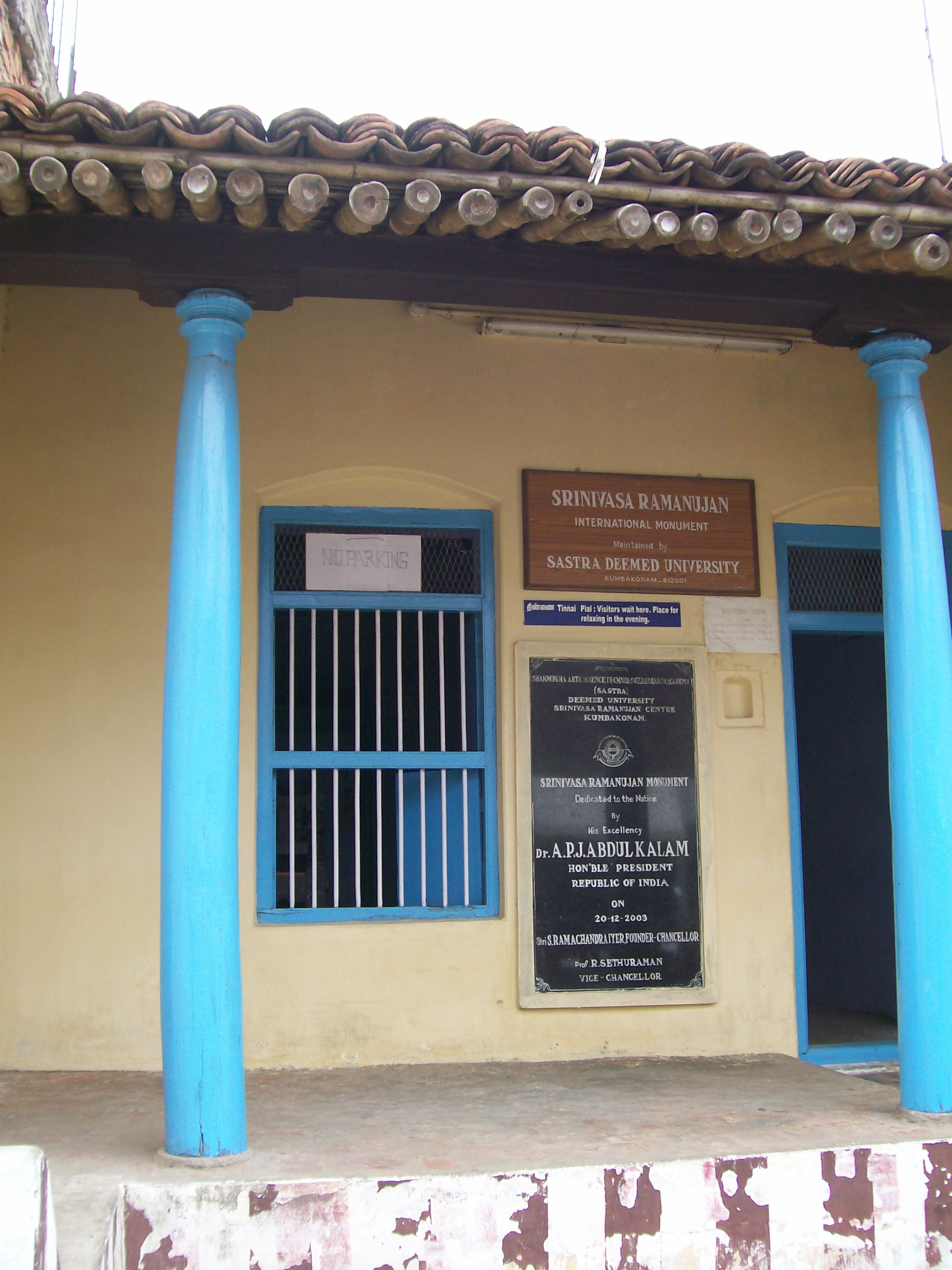
Ramanujan's home on Sarangapani Sannidhi Street, Kumbakonam

Ramanujan (literally "younger brother of Rama", a Hindu deity) was born in British-ruled India on 22 December 1887 into a Tamil Brahmin Iyengar family in Erode, in modern Tamil Nadu. His father, Kuppuswamy Srinivasa Iyengar, originally from Thanjavur district, worked as a clerk in a sari shop. His mother, Komalatammal, was a housewife and sang at a local temple. They lived in a small traditional home on Sarangapani Sannidhi Street in the town of Kumbakonam. The family home later became a museum. When Ramanujan was a year and a half old, his mother gave birth to a son, Sadagopan, who died less than three months later. In December 1889, Ramanujan contracted smallpox, but recovered. He moved with his mother to her parents' house in Kanchipuram, near Madras (modern Chennai). His mother gave birth to two more children, in 1891 and 1894, both of whom died before their first birthdays.

On 1 October 1892, Ramanujan was enrolled at the local school. After his maternal grandfather lost his job as a court official in Kanchipuram, Ramanujan and his mother moved back to Kumbakonam, and he was enrolled in Kangayan Primary School. When his paternal grandfather died, he was sent back to his maternal grandparents, then living in Madras. He did not like school in Madras, and tried to avoid attending. His family enlisted a local constable to make sure he attended school. Within six months, Ramanujan was back in Kumbakonam.

Since Ramanujan's father worked long hours, his mother raised him, fostering a close bond. She taught him the puranas, devotional singing, temple worship, and strict dietary observance in accordance to Sri Vaishnava Iyengar tradition. At Kangayan Primary School, Ramanujan performed well. Just before turning 10, in November 1897, he passed his primary examinations in English, Tamil, geography, and arithmetic with the best scores in the district. That year, Ramanujan entered Town Higher Secondary School, where he encountered formal mathematics for the first time.

A child prodigy by age 11, he had exhausted the mathematical knowledge of two college students who were lodgers at his home. He was later lent a book written by S. L. Loney on advanced trigonometry. He mastered this by the age of 13 while discovering sophisticated theorems on his own. By 14, he received merit certificates and academic awards that continued throughout his school career, and he assisted the school in the logistics of assigning its 1,200 students (each with differing needs) to its approximately 35 teachers. He completed mathematical exams in half the allotted time, and showed a familiarity with geometry and infinite series. Ramanujan was shown how to solve cubic equations in 1902. He would later develop his own method to solve the quartic. In 1903, he tried to solve the quintic, not knowing that it was impossible to solve with radicals.

In 1903, when he was 16, Ramanujan obtained from a friend a library copy of A Synopsis of Elementary Results in Pure and Applied Mathematics, G. S. Carr's collection of 5,000 theorems. Ramanujan reportedly studied the contents of the book in detail. The next year, Ramanujan independently developed and investigated the Bernoulli numbers and calculated the Euler–Mascheroni constant up to 15 decimal places. His peers at the time said they "rarely understood him" and "stood in respectful awe" of him.

When he graduated from Town Higher Secondary School in 1904, Ramanujan was awarded the K. Ranganatha Rao prize for mathematics by the school's headmaster, Krishnaswami Iyer. Iyer introduced Ramanujan as an outstanding student who deserved scores higher than the maximum. He received a scholarship to study at Government Arts College, Kumbakonam, but was so intent on mathematics that he could not focus on any other subjects and failed most of them, losing his scholarship in the process. In August 1905, Ramanujan ran away from home, heading towards Visakhapatnam, and stayed in Rajahmundry for about a month. He later enrolled at Pachaiyappa's College in Madras. There, he passed in mathematics, choosing only to attempt questions that appealed to him and leaving the rest unanswered, but performed poorly in other subjects, such as English, physiology, and Sanskrit. Ramanujan failed his Fellow of Arts exam in December 1906 and again a year later. Without an FA degree, he left college and continued to pursue independent research in mathematics, living in extreme poverty and often on the brink of starvation.

In 1910, after a meeting between the 23-year-old Ramanujan and the founder of the Indian Mathematical Society, V. Ramaswamy Aiyer, Ramanujan began to receive recognition in Madras's mathematical circles, leading to his inclusion as a researcher at the University of Madras.

== Adulthood in India ==
On 14 July 1909, Ramanujan married Janaki (Janakiammal; 21 March 1899 – 13 April 1994), a girl his mother had selected for him a year earlier and who was ten years old when they married. It was not unusual then for marriages to be arranged with girls at a young age. Janaki was from Rajendram, a village close to Marudur (Karur district) Railway Station. Ramanujan's father did not participate in the marriage ceremony. As was common at that time, Janaki continued to stay at her maternal home for three years after marriage, until she reached puberty. In 1912, she and Ramanujan's mother joined Ramanujan in Madras.

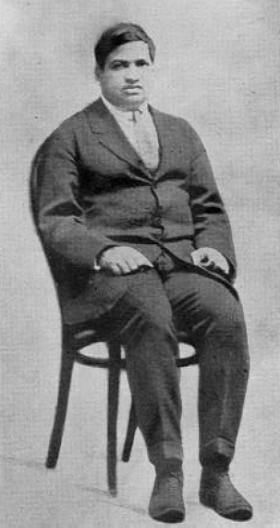
Ramanujan seated alone

After the marriage, Ramanujan developed a hydrocele testis. The condition could be treated with a routine surgical operation that would release the blocked fluid in the scrotal sac, but his family could not afford the operation. In January 1910, a doctor volunteered to do the surgery at no cost.

After his successful surgery, Ramanujan searched for a job. He stayed at a friend's house while he went from door to door around Madras looking for a clerical position. To make money, he tutored students at Presidency College who were preparing for their Fellow of Arts exam.

In late 1910, Ramanujan was sick again. He feared for his health, and told his friend R. Radakrishna Iyer to "hand [his notebooks] over to Professor Singaravelu Mudaliar [the mathematics professor at Pachaiyappa's College] or to the British professor Edward B. Ross, of the Madras Christian College." After Ramanujan recovered and retrieved his notebooks from Iyer, he took a train from Kumbakonam to Villupuram, a city under French control. In 1912, Ramanujan moved with his wife and mother to a house in Saiva Muthaiah Mudali street, George Town, Madras, where they lived for a few months. In May 1913, upon securing a research position at Madras University, Ramanujan moved with his family to Triplicane.

=== Pursuit of career in mathematics ===
In 1910, Ramanujan met deputy collector V. Ramaswamy Aiyer, who founded the Indian Mathematical Society. Wishing for a job at the revenue department where Aiyer worked, Ramanujan showed him his mathematics notebooks. As Aiyer later recalled:

I was struck by the extraordinary mathematical results contained in [the notebooks]. I had no mind to smother his genius by an appointment in the lowest rungs of the revenue department.

Aiyer sent Ramanujan, with letters of introduction, to his mathematician friends in Madras. Some of them looked at his work and gave him letters of introduction to R. Ramachandra Rao, the district collector for Nellore and the secretary of the Indian Mathematical Society. Rao was impressed by Ramanujan's research but doubted that it was his own work. Ramanujan mentioned a correspondence he had with Professor Saldhana, a notable Bombay mathematician, in which Saldhana expressed a lack of understanding of his work but concluded that he was not a fraud. Ramanujan's friend C. V. Rajagopalachari tried to quell Rao's doubts about Ramanujan's academic integrity. Rao agreed to give Ramanujan another chance, and listened as Ramanujan discussed elliptic integrals, hypergeometric series, and his theory of divergent series, which Rao said ultimately convinced him of Ramanujan's brilliance. When Rao asked him what he wanted, Ramanujan replied that he needed work and financial support. Rao consented and sent him to Madras. He continued his research with Rao's financial aid. With Aiyer's help, Ramanujan had his work published in the Journal of the Indian Mathematical Society.

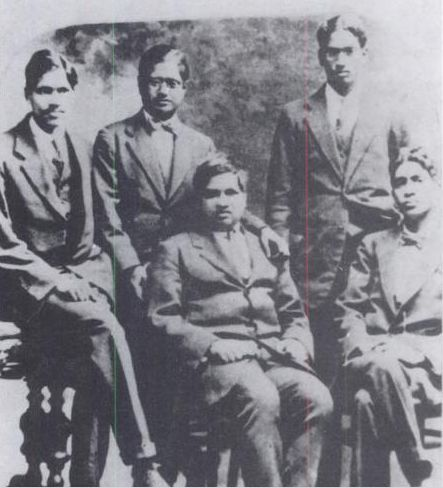
K Ananda Rau seated with Ramanujan

One of the first problems he posed in the journal was to find the value of:

$$\sqrt{1+2\sqrt{1+3 \sqrt{1+\cdots}}}$$

He waited for a solution to be offered in three issues, over six months, but failed to receive any. At the end, Ramanujan supplied an incomplete solution to the problem himself. On page 105 of his first notebook, he formulated an equation that could be used to solve the infinitely nested radicals problem.

$$x+n+a = \sqrt{ax+(n+a)^2 +x\sqrt{a(x+n)+(n+a)^2+(x+n) \sqrt{\cdots}}}$$

Using this equation, the answer to the question posed in the Journal was simply 3, obtained by setting x = 2, n = 1, and a = 0. Ramanujan wrote his first formal paper for the Journal on the properties of Bernoulli numbers. One property he discovered was that the denominators of the fractions of Bernoulli numbers (sequence A027642 in the OEIS) are always divisible by six. He also devised a method of calculating B_{n} based on previous Bernoulli numbers. One of these methods follows:

It will be observed that if n is even but not equal to zero,

1. B_{n} is a fraction and the numerator of B_{n}/n in its lowest terms is a prime number,
2. the denominator of B_{n} contains each of the factors 2 and 3 once and only once,
3. 2^{n}(2^{n} − 1)B_{n}/n is an integer and 2(2^{n} − 1)B_{n} consequently is an odd integer.

In his 17-page paper "Some Properties of Bernoulli's Numbers" (1911), Ramanujan gave three proofs, two corollaries and three conjectures. His writing initially had many flaws. As Journal editor M. T. Narayana Iyengar noted:

Mr. Ramanujan's methods were so terse and novel and his presentation so lacking in clearness and precision, that the ordinary [mathematical reader], unaccustomed to such intellectual gymnastics, could hardly follow him.

Ramanujan later wrote another paper and also continued to provide problems in the Journal. In early 1912, he got a temporary job in the Madras Accountant General's office, with a monthly salary of 20 rupees. He lasted only a few weeks. Toward the end of that assignment, he applied for a position under the Chief Accountant of the Madras Port Trust.

In a letter dated 9 February 1912, Ramanujan wrote:

Sir,
I understand there is a clerkship vacant in your office, and I beg to apply for the same. I have passed the Matriculation Examination and studied up to the F.A. but was prevented from pursuing my studies further owing to several untoward circumstances. I have, however, been devoting all my time to Mathematics and developing the subject. I can say I am quite confident I can do justice to my work if I am appointed to the post. I therefore beg to request that you will be good enough to confer the appointment on me.

Attached to his application was a recommendation from E. W. Middlemast, a mathematics professor at the Presidency College, who wrote that Ramanujan was "a young man of quite exceptional capacity in Mathematics". Three weeks after he applied, on 1 March, Ramanujan learned that he had been accepted as a Class III, Grade IV accounting clerk, making 30 rupees per month. At his office, Ramanujan easily and quickly completed the work he was given and spent his spare time doing mathematical research. Ramanujan's boss, Sir Francis Spring, and S. Narayana Iyer, a colleague who was also treasurer of the Indian Mathematical Society, encouraged Ramanujan in his mathematical pursuits.

=== Contacting British mathematicians ===
In the spring of 1913, Narayana Iyer, Ramachandra Rao and E. W. Middlemast tried to present Ramanujan's work to British mathematicians. M. J. M. Hill of University College London commented that Ramanujan's papers were riddled with holes. He said that although Ramanujan had "a taste for mathematics, and some ability", he lacked the necessary educational background and foundation to be accepted by mathematicians. Although Hill did not offer to take Ramanujan on as a student, he gave thorough and serious professional advice on his work. With the help of friends, Ramanujan drafted letters to leading mathematicians at Cambridge University.

The first two professors, H. F. Baker and E. W. Hobson, returned Ramanujan's papers without comment. On 16 January 1913, Ramanujan wrote to G. H. Hardy, whom he knew from studying Orders of Infinity (1910). Coming from an unknown mathematician, the nine pages of mathematics made Hardy initially view Ramanujan's manuscripts as a possible fraud. Hardy recognised some of Ramanujan's formulae but others "seemed scarcely possible to believe". One of the theorems Hardy found amazing was on the bottom of page three (valid for 0 < a < b + 1/2):

$$\int\limits_0^\infty \frac{1+\dfrac{x^2}{(b+1)^2}}{1+\dfrac{x^2}{a^2}} \times\frac{1+\dfrac{x^2}{(b+2)^2}}{1+\dfrac{x^2}{(a+1)^2}}\times\cdots\,dx
= \frac{\sqrt \pi}{2} \times\frac{\Gamma\left(a+\frac12\right) \Gamma(b+1) \Gamma(b-a+1)}{\Gamma(a)\Gamma\left(b+\frac12\right)\Gamma\left(b-a + \frac12 \right)}.$$

Hardy was also impressed by some of Ramanujan's other work relating to infinite series:

$$1 - 5\left(\frac12\right)^3 + 9\left(\frac{1\times3}{2\times4}\right)^3 - 13\left(\frac{1\times3\times5}{2\times4\times6}\right)^3 + \cdots = \frac{2}{\pi}$$

$$1 + 9\left(\frac14\right)^4 + 17\left(\frac{1\times5}{4\times8}\right)^4 + 25\left(\frac{1\times5\times9}{4\times8\times12}\right)^4 + \cdots = \frac{2\sqrt 2}{\sqrt\pi\,\Gamma^2\left(\frac34\right)}.$$

The first result had already been determined by G. Bauer in 1859. The second was new to Hardy, and was derived from a class of functions called hypergeometric series, which had first been researched by Euler and Gauss. Hardy found these results "much more intriguing" than Gauss's work on integrals. After seeing Ramanujan's theorems on continued fractions on the last page of the manuscripts, Hardy said the theorems "defeated me completely; I had never seen anything in the least like them before", and that they "must be true, because, if they were not true, no one would have the imagination to invent them". Hardy asked a colleague, J. E. Littlewood, to take a look at the papers. Littlewood was amazed by Ramanujan's genius. After discussing the papers with Littlewood, Hardy concluded that the letters were "certainly the most remarkable I have received" and that Ramanujan was "a mathematician of the highest quality, a man of altogether exceptional originality and power". One colleague, E. H. Neville, later remarked that "No one who was in the mathematical circles in Cambridge at that time can forget the sensation caused by this letter... not one [theorem] could have been set in the most advanced mathematical examination in the world".

On 8 February 1913, Hardy wrote Ramanujan a letter expressing interest in his work, adding that it was "essential that I should see proofs of some of your assertions". Before his letter arrived in Madras during the third week of February, Hardy contacted the Indian Office to plan for Ramanujan's trip to Cambridge. Secretary Arthur Davies of the Advisory Committee for Indian Students met with Ramanujan to discuss the overseas trip. In accordance with his Brahmin upbringing, Ramanujan refused to leave his country to "go to a foreign land", and his parents were also opposed for the same reason. Meanwhile, he sent Hardy a letter packed with theorems, writing, "I have found a friend in you who views my labour sympathetically."

To supplement Hardy's endorsement, Gilbert Walker, a former mathematical lecturer at Trinity College, Cambridge, looked at Ramanujan's work and expressed amazement, urging the young man to spend time at Cambridge. As a result of Walker's endorsement, B. Hanumantha Rao, a mathematics professor at an engineering college, invited Ramanujan's colleague Narayana Iyer to a meeting of the Board of Studies in Mathematics to discuss "what we can do for S. Ramanujan". The board agreed to grant Ramanujan a monthly research scholarship of 75 rupees for the next two years at the University of Madras.

While he was engaged as a research student, Ramanujan continued to submit papers to the Journal of the Indian Mathematical Society. In one instance, Iyer submitted some of Ramanujan's theorems on summation of series to the journal, adding, "The following theorem is due to S. Ramanujan, the mathematics student of Madras University." Later in November, British Professor Edward B. Ross of Madras Christian College, whom Ramanujan had met a few years before, stormed into his class one day with his eyes glowing, asking his students, "Does Ramanujan know Polish?" The reason was that in one paper, Ramanujan had anticipated the work of a Polish mathematician whose paper had just arrived in the day's mail. In his quarterly papers, Ramanujan drew up theorems to make definite integrals more easily solvable. Working off Giuliano Frullani's 1821 integral theorem, Ramanujan formulated generalisations that could be made to evaluate formerly unyielding integrals.

Hardy's correspondence with Ramanujan soured after Ramanujan refused to come to England. Hardy enlisted a colleague lecturing in Madras, E. H. Neville, to mentor and bring Ramanujan to England. Neville asked Ramanujan why he would not go to Cambridge. Ramanujan apparently then accepted the proposal; Neville said, "Ramanujan needed no converting" and "his parents' opposition had been withdrawn". Apparently, Ramanujan's mother had a vivid dream in which Ramanujan was surrounded by Europeans, and the family goddess, the deity of Namagiri, commanded her "to stand no longer between her son and the fulfilment of his life's purpose". On 17 March 1914, Ramanujan travelled to England by ship, leaving his wife to stay with his parents in India.

== Life in England ==
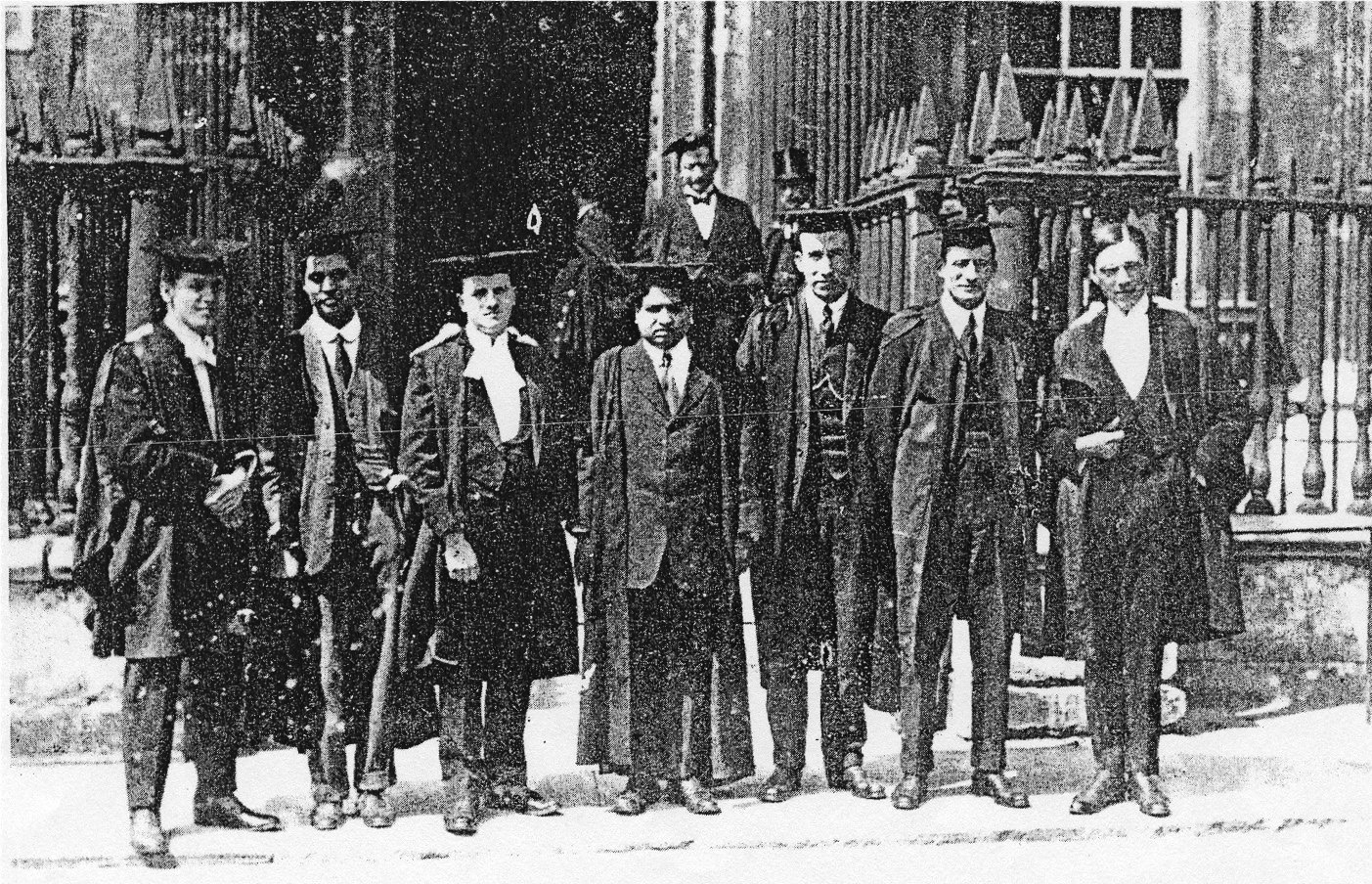
Ramanujan (centre) and his colleague G. H. Hardy (rightmost), with scientists and other mathematicians, outside the Senate House, Cambridge, c.1914–19

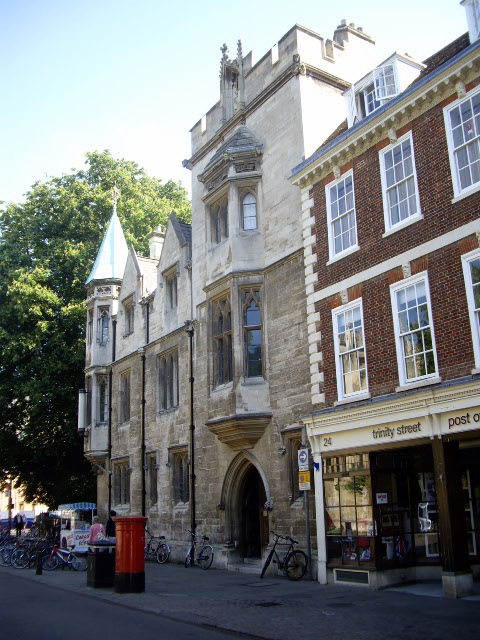
Whewell's Court, Trinity College, Cambridge

Ramanujan departed from Madras aboard the S.S. Nevasa on 17 March 1914. When he disembarked in London on 14 April, Neville was waiting for him with a car. Four days later, Neville took him to his house on Chesterton Road in Cambridge. Ramanujan immediately began his work with Littlewood and Hardy. After six weeks, Ramanujan moved out of Neville's house and took up residence on Whewell's Court, a five-minute walk from Hardy's room.

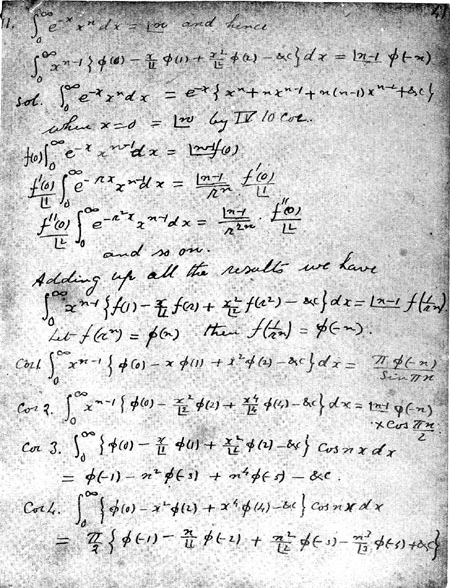
Ramanujan's "Master Theorem" page

Hardy and Littlewood began to look at Ramanujan's notebooks. Hardy had already received 120 theorems from Ramanujan in the first two letters, but there were many more results and theorems in the notebooks. Hardy saw that some were wrong, others had already been discovered, and the rest were new breakthroughs. Ramanujan left a deep impression on Hardy and Littlewood. Littlewood commented, "I can believe that he's at least a Jacobi", while Hardy said he "can compare him only with Euler or Jacobi."

Ramanujan spent nearly five years in Cambridge collaborating with Hardy and Littlewood, and published part of his findings there. Hardy and Ramanujan had highly contrasting personalities. Their collaboration was a clash of different cultures, beliefs, and working styles. In the previous few decades, the foundations of mathematics had come into question and the need for mathematically rigorous proofs was recognised. Hardy was an atheist and an apostle of proof and mathematical rigour, whereas Ramanujan was a deeply religious man who relied very strongly on his intuition and insights. Hardy tried his best to fill the gaps in Ramanujan's education and to mentor him in the need for formal proofs to support his results, without hindering his inspiration—a conflict that neither found easy.

Ramanujan was awarded a Bachelor of Arts by Research degree (the predecessor of the PhD degree) in March 1916 for his work on highly composite numbers, sections of the first part of which had been published the preceding year in the Proceedings of the London Mathematical Society. The paper was more than 50 pages long and proved various properties of such numbers. Hardy disliked this topic but remarked that though it engaged with what he called the "backwater of mathematics", in it Ramanujan displayed "extraordinary mastery over the algebra of inequalities".

On 6 December 1917, Ramanujan was elected to the London Mathematical Society. On 2 May 1918, he was elected a Fellow of the Royal Society, the second Indian admitted, after Ardaseer Cursetjee in 1841. At age 31, Ramanujan was one of the youngest Fellows in the Royal Society's history. He was elected "for his investigation in elliptic functions and the Theory of Numbers." On 13 October 1918, he was the first Indian to be elected a Fellow of Trinity College, Cambridge.

== Illness and death ==
Ramanujan had numerous health problems throughout his life. His health worsened in England; possibly he was also less resilient due to the difficulty of keeping to the strict dietary requirements of his religion there and because of wartime rationing in 1914–1918. He was diagnosed with tuberculosis and a severe vitamin deficiency, and confined to a sanatorium. He attempted suicide in late 1917 or early 1918 by jumping on the tracks of a London underground station. Scotland Yard arrested him for attempting suicide (which was a crime), but released him after Hardy intervened. In 1919, Ramanujan returned to Kumbakonam, Madras Presidency, where he died in 1920 aged 32. After his death, his brother Tirunarayanan compiled Ramanujan's remaining handwritten notes, consisting of formulae on singular moduli, hypergeometric series and continued fractions. In his last days, though in severe pain, "he continued doing his mathematics filling sheet after sheet with numbers", as recounted by Ramanujan's widow, Janaki Ammal.

After Ramanujan's death, Janaki Ammal moved to Bombay. In 1931, she returned to Madras and settled in Triplicane, where she supported herself on a pension from Madras University and income from tailoring. In 1950, she adopted a son, W. Narayanan, who eventually became an officer of the State Bank of India and raised a family. In her later years, she was granted a lifetime pension from Ramanujan's former employer, the Madras Port Trust, and pensions from, among others, the Indian National Science Academy and the state governments of Tamil Nadu, Andhra Pradesh and West Bengal. She continued to cherish Ramanujan's memory, and was active in efforts to increase his public recognition; prominent mathematicians, including George Andrews, Bruce C. Berndt and Béla Bollobás made it a point to visit her while in India. She died at her Triplicane residence in 1994.

A 1994 analysis of Ramanujan's medical records and symptoms by D. A. B. Young concluded that his medical symptoms—including his past relapses, fevers, and hepatic conditions—were much closer to those of hepatic amoebiasis, an illness then widespread in Madras, than of tuberculosis. He had two episodes of dysentery before he left India. When not properly treated, amoebic dysentery can lie dormant for years and lead to hepatic amoebiasis, whose diagnosis was not then well established. At the time, if properly diagnosed, amoebiasis was a treatable and often curable disease; British soldiers who contracted it during World War I were being successfully cured of amoebiasis around the time Ramanujan left England.

== Personality and spiritual life ==
While asleep, I had an unusual experience. There was a red screen formed by flowing blood, as it were. I was observing it. Suddenly a hand began to write on the screen. I became all attention. That hand wrote a number of elliptic integrals. They stuck to my mind. As soon as I woke up, I committed them to writing.

— Srinivasa Ramanujan

Ramanujan has been described as a person of a somewhat shy and quiet disposition, a dignified man with pleasant manners. He lived a simple life at Cambridge. Ramanujan's first Indian biographers describe him as a rigorously orthodox Hindu. He credited his acumen to his family goddess, Namagiri Thayar (Goddess Mahalakshmi) of Namakkal. He looked to her for inspiration in his work and said he dreamed of blood drops that symbolised her consort, Narasimha. Later he had visions of scrolls of complex mathematical content unfolding before his eyes. He often said, "An equation for me has no meaning unless it expresses a thought of God."

According to mathematicians and biographers, Ramanujan understood mathematical formulations as an expression of divine reality, viewing zero as absolute reality (Nirguṇa Brahman) and infinity as manifestation of that reality.

Hardy cites Ramanujan as remarking that all religions seemed equally true to him. Hardy further argued that Ramanujan's religious belief had been romanticised by Westerners and overstated—in reference to his belief, not practice—by Indian biographers. At the same time, he remarked on Ramanujan's strict vegetarianism. Biographer Robert Kanigel observed that Hardy's evaluation reflected his own militant atheism and rationalist worldview, which struggled to comprehend Ramanujan's Sri Vaishnava convictions. Kanigel and other contemporaries noted that Ramanujan's mathematical intuition was entwined with his faith, and that he may have refrained from discussing his religious experiences in detail with Hardy to avoid European scepticism. Hardy's close friend C. P. Snow similarly commented that Hardy lacked insight into Ramanujan's inner spiritual life.

In an interview with Frontline, Berndt said: "Many people falsely promulgate mystical powers to Ramanujan's mathematical thinking. It is not true. He has meticulously recorded every result in his three notebooks", further speculating that Ramanujan worked out intermediate results on slate because he could not afford the paper to record them more permanently.

Berndt reported that Janaki said in 1984 that Ramanujan spent so much of his time on mathematics that he did not go to the temple, that she and her mother often fed him because he had no time to eat, and that most of the religious stories attributed to him originated with others, though his orthopraxy was not in doubt.

== Mathematical achievements ==
In mathematics, there is a distinction between insight and formulating or working through a proof. Ramanujan proposed an abundance of formulae that could be investigated later in depth, often without proofs. G. H. Hardy said that Ramanujan's discoveries are unusually rich and that there is often more to them than initially meets the eye. As a byproduct of his work, new directions of research were opened up. Examples of the most intriguing of these formulae include infinite series for π, one of which is given below:

$$\frac{1}{\pi} = \frac{2\sqrt 2}{9801} \sum^\infty_{k=0} \frac{(4k)!(1103+26390k)}{(k!)^4 396^{4k}}.$$

This result is based on the negative fundamental discriminant $d = -4 \times 58 = -232$ with class number $h(d) = 2$. Further, $26390 = 5 \times 7 \times 13 \times 58$ and $16 \times 9801 = 396^2$, which is related to the fact that

$$e^{\pi\sqrt{58}} = 396^4 - 104.000000177\dots.$$

This might be compared to Heegner numbers, which have class number 1 and yield similar formulae.

Ramanujan's series for π converges extraordinarily rapidly and forms the basis of some of the fastest algorithms used to calculate π. Truncating the sum to the first term also gives the approximation $\frac{9801 \sqrt{2}}{4412}$ for π, which is correct to six decimal places; truncating it to the first two terms gives a value correct to 14 decimal places.

One of Ramanujan's remarkable capabilities was the rapid solution of problems, illustrated by the following anecdote about an incident in which P. C. Mahalanobis posed a problem:

Imagine that you are on a street with houses marked 1 through n. There is a house in between (x) such that the sum of the house numbers to the left of it equals the sum of the house numbers to its right. If n is between 50 and 500, what are n and x?' This is a bivariate problem with multiple solutions. Ramanujan thought about it and gave the answer with a twist: He gave a continued fraction. The unusual part was that it was the solution to the whole class of problems. Mahalanobis was astounded and asked how he did it. 'It is simple. The minute I heard the problem, I knew that the answer was a continued fraction. Which continued fraction, I asked myself. Then the answer came to my mind', Ramanujan replied."

His intuition also led him to derive some previously unknown identities, such as

$$\begin{align}
& \left ( 1+2\sum_{n=1}^\infty \frac{\cos(n\theta)}{\cosh(n\pi)} \right )^{-2} + \left (1+2\sum_{n=1}^\infty \frac{\cosh(n\theta)}{\cosh(n\pi)} \right )^{-2} \\[6pt]
= {} & \frac {2 \Gamma^4 \bigl( \frac34 \bigr)} \pi = \frac{8\pi^3}{\Gamma^4 \bigl( \frac14 \bigr)}
\end{align}$$

for all $\theta$ such that $|\Re (\theta)|<\pi$ and $|\Im (\theta)|<\pi$, where Γ(z) is the gamma function, and related to a special value of the Dedekind eta function. Expanding into series of powers and equating coefficients of $\theta^0$, $\theta^4$, and $\theta^8$ gives some deep identities for the hyperbolic secant.

In 1918, Hardy and Ramanujan studied the partition function P(n) extensively. They gave a non-convergent asymptotic series that permits exact computation of the number of partitions of an integer. In 1937, Hans Rademacher refined their formula to find an exact convergent series solution to this problem. Ramanujan and Hardy's work in this area gave rise to a powerful new method for finding asymptotic formulae called the circle method.

In the last year of his life, Ramanujan discovered mock theta functions. For many years, these functions were a mystery, but they have become known as the holomorphic parts of harmonic weak Maass forms.

=== The Ramanujan conjecture ===
Although there are numerous statements that could have borne the name Ramanujan conjecture, one was highly influential in later work. In particular, the connection of this conjecture with conjectures of André Weil in algebraic geometry opened up new areas of research. That Ramanujan conjecture is an assertion on the size of the tau-function, which has a generating function as the discriminant modular form Δ(q), a typical cusp form in the theory of modular forms. It was finally proven in 1973, as a consequence of Pierre Deligne's proof of the Weil conjectures. The reduction step involved is complicated. Deligne won a Fields Medal in 1978 for that work.

In his paper "On certain arithmetical functions", Ramanujan defined the so-called delta-function, whose coefficients are called τ(n) (the Ramanujan tau function). He proved many congruences for these numbers, such as τ(p) ≡ 1 + p^{11} mod 691 for primes p. This congruence (and others like it that Ramanujan proved) inspired Jean-Pierre Serre (1954 Fields Medalist) to conjecture that there is a theory of Galois representations that "explains" these congruences and more generally all modular forms. Δ(z) is the first example of a modular form to be studied in this way. Deligne (in his Fields Medal-winning work) proved Serre's conjecture. The proof of Fermat's Last Theorem proceeds by first reinterpreting elliptic curves and modular forms in terms of these Galois representations. Without this theory, there would be no proof of Fermat's Last Theorem.

=== Ramanujan's notebooks ===
While still in Madras, Ramanujan recorded the bulk of his results in four notebooks of looseleaf paper. They were mostly written up without any derivations. This is probably the origin of the misapprehension that Ramanujan was unable to prove his results and simply thought up the final result directly. Mathematician Bruce C. Berndt, in his review of these notebooks and Ramanujan's work, says that Ramanujan most certainly was able to prove most of his results, but chose not to record the proofs in his notes.

This may have been for any number of reasons. Since paper was very expensive, Ramanujan did most of his work and perhaps his proofs on slate, after which he transferred the final results to paper. At the time, slates were commonly used by mathematics students in the Madras Presidency. He was also quite likely to have been influenced by the style of G. S. Carr's book, which stated results without proofs. It is also possible that Ramanujan considered his work to be for his personal interest alone and therefore recorded only the results.

The first notebook has 351 pages with 16 somewhat organised chapters and some unorganised material. The second has 256 pages in 21 chapters and 100 unorganised pages, and the third 33 unorganised pages. The results in his notebooks inspired numerous papers by later mathematicians trying to prove what he had found. Hardy himself wrote papers exploring material from Ramanujan's work, as did G. N. Watson, B. M. Wilson, and Bruce Berndt.

In 1976, George Andrews rediscovered a fourth notebook with 87 unorganised pages, the so-called "lost notebook".

== Hardy–Ramanujan number 1729 ==
The number 1729 is known as the Hardy–Ramanujan number after a famous visit by Hardy to see Ramanujan at a hospital. In Hardy's words:

I remember once going to see him when he was ill at Putney. I had ridden in taxi cab number 1729 and remarked that the number seemed to me rather a dull one, and that I hoped it was not an unfavorable omen. "No", he replied, "it is a very interesting number; it is the smallest number expressible as the sum of two cubes in two different ways."

Immediately before this anecdote, Hardy quoted Littlewood as saying, "Every positive integer was one of [Ramanujan's] personal friends."

The two different ways are:

$$1729=1^3+12^3=9^3+10^3.$$

Generalisations of this idea have created the notion of "taxicab numbers".

== Mathematicians' views of Ramanujan ==
"Of course, we're always hoping. That's one reason I always read letters that come in from obscure places and are written in an illegible scrawl. I always hope it might be from another Ramanujan."

— Freeman Dyson on how another such genius might appear anywhere

In his obituary of Ramanujan, written for Nature in 1920, Hardy observed that Ramanujan's work primarily involved fields less known even among other pure mathematicians, concluding:

His insight into formulae was quite amazing, and altogether beyond anything I have met with in any European mathematician. It is perhaps useless to speculate as to his history had he been introduced to modern ideas and methods at sixteen instead of at twenty-six. It is not extravagant to suppose that he might have become the greatest mathematician of his time. What he actually did is wonderful enough... when the researches which his work has suggested have been completed, it will probably seem a good deal more wonderful than it does to-day.

Hardy further said:

He combined a power of generalisation, a feeling for form, and a capacity for rapid modification of his hypotheses, that were often really startling, and made him, in his own peculiar field, without a rival in his day. The limitations of his knowledge were as startling as its profundity. Here was a man who could work out modular equations and theorems... to orders unheard of, whose mastery of continued fractions was... beyond that of any mathematician in the world, who had found for himself the functional equation of the zeta function and the dominant terms of many of the most famous problems in the analytic theory of numbers; and yet he had never heard of a doubly periodic function or of Cauchy's theorem, and had indeed but the vaguest idea of what a function of a complex variable was..."

As an example, Hardy commented on 15 theorems in the first letter. Of those, the first 13 are correct and insightful, the 14th is incorrect but insightful, and the 15th is correct but misleading.

(14): The coefficient of $x^n$ in $\left(1-2 x+2 x^4-2 x^9+\cdots\right)^{-1}$ is the integer nearest to
$$\frac{1}{4 n}\left(\cosh (\pi \sqrt{n})-\frac{\sinh (\pi \sqrt{ n})}{\pi \sqrt{n}}\right) .$$
This "was one of the most fruitful he ever made, since it ended by leading us to all our joint work on partitions".

When asked about the methods Ramanujan used to arrive at his solutions, Hardy said they were "arrived at by a process of mingled argument, intuition, and induction, of which he was entirely unable to give any coherent account." He also said that he had "never met his equal, and can compare him only with Euler or Jacobi". Hardy thought Ramanujan worked in a 19th-century style, where arriving at correct formulas was more important than systematic formal theories. Hardy thought his achievements were greatest in algebra, especially hypergeometric series and continued fractions.

It is possible that the great days of formulas are finished, and that Ramanujan ought to have been born 100 years ago; but he was by far the greatest formalist of his time. There have been a good many more important, and I suppose one must say greater, mathematicians than Ramanujan during the last 50 years, but not one who could stand up to him on his own ground. Playing the game of which he knew the rules, he could give any mathematician in the world fifteen.

He discovered fewer new things in analysis, possibly because he lacked the formal education and did not find books to learn it from, but rediscovered many results, including the prime number theorem. In analysis, he worked on the elliptic functions and the analytic theory of numbers. In analytic number theory, he was as imaginative as usual, but much of what he imagined was wrong. Hardy blamed this on the inherent difficulty of analytic number theory, where imagination had led many great mathematicians astray. In analytic number theory, rigorous proof is more important than imagination, the opposite of Ramanujan's style. His "one great failure" is that he knew "nothing at all about the theory of analytic functions".

Littlewood reportedly said that helping Ramanujan catch up with European mathematics beyond what was available in India was very difficult because each new point mentioned to Ramanujan caused him to produce original ideas that prevented Littlewood from continuing the lesson.

K. Srinivasa Rao has said, "As for his place in the world of Mathematics, we quote Bruce C. Berndt: 'Paul Erdős has passed on to us Hardy's personal ratings of mathematicians. Suppose that we rate mathematicians on the basis of pure talent on a scale from 0 to 100. Hardy gave himself a score of 25, J. E. Littlewood 30, David Hilbert 80 and Ramanujan 100.'" During a May 2011 lecture at IIT Madras, Berndt said that over the last 40 years, as nearly all of Ramanujan's conjectures had been proven, there had been greater appreciation of Ramanujan's work and brilliance, and that Ramanujan's work was pervading many areas of modern mathematics and physics.

== Posthumous recognition ==
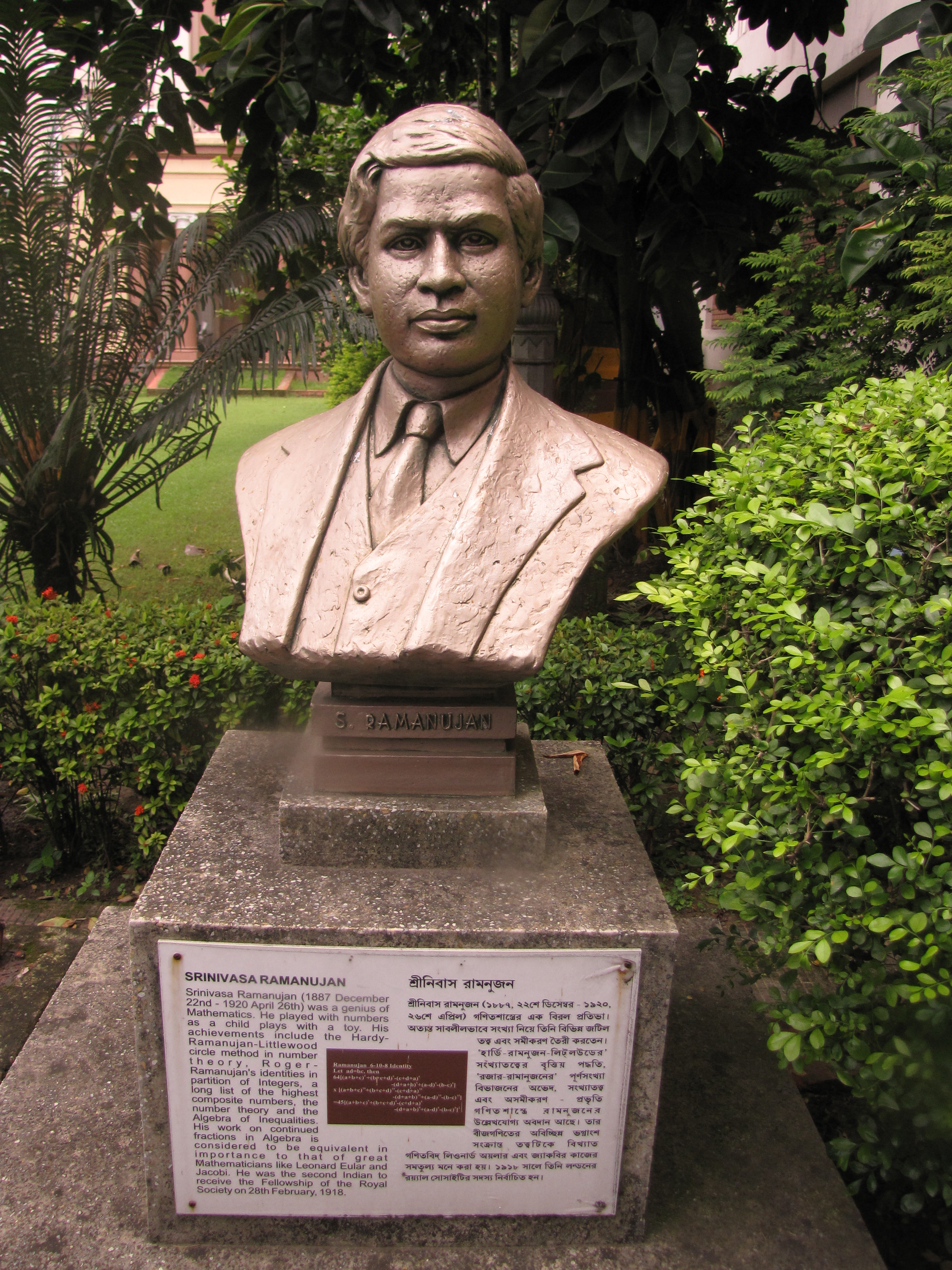
Bust of Ramanujan in the garden of Birla Industrial & Technological Museum in Kolkata, India

The year after his death, Nature listed Ramanujan among other distinguished scientists and mathematicians on a "Calendar of Scientific Pioneers" who had achieved eminence. Ramanujan's home state of Tamil Nadu celebrates 22 December (Ramanujan's birthday) as 'State IT Day'. Stamps picturing Ramanujan were issued by the government of India in 1962, 2011, 2012 and 2016.

Since Ramanujan's centennial year, his birthday, 22 December, has been annually celebrated as Ramanujan Day by the Government Arts College, Kumbakonam, where he studied, and at the IIT Madras in Chennai. The International Centre for Theoretical Physics (ICTP) has created a prize in Ramanujan's name for young mathematicians from developing countries in cooperation with the International Mathematical Union, which nominates members of the prize committee. SASTRA University, a private university based in Tamil Nadu, has instituted the SASTRA Ramanujan Prize of US$10,000 to be given annually to a mathematician not exceeding age 32 for outstanding contributions in an area of mathematics influenced by Ramanujan.

Based on the recommendations of a committee appointed by the University Grants Commission (UGC), Government of India, the Srinivasa Ramanujan Centre, established by SASTRA, has been declared an off-campus centre under the ambit of SASTRA University. House of Ramanujan Mathematics, a museum of Ramanujan's life and work, is also on this campus. SASTRA purchased and renovated the house where Ramanujan lived at Kumabakonam.

In 2011, on the 125th anniversary of his birth, the Indian government declared that 22 December will be celebrated every year as National Mathematics Day. Then Indian Prime Minister Manmohan Singh also declared that 2012 would be celebrated as National Mathematics Year and 22 December as National Mathematics Day of India.

Ramanujan IT City is an information technology (IT) special economic zone (SEZ) in Chennai that was built in 2011. Situated next to the Tidel Park, it includes 25 acres (10 ha) with two zones, with a total area of 5.7 million square feet (530,000 m^{2}), including 4.5 million square feet (420,000 m^{2}) of office space.

== Commemorative postal stamps ==
Commemorative stamps released by India Post (by year):

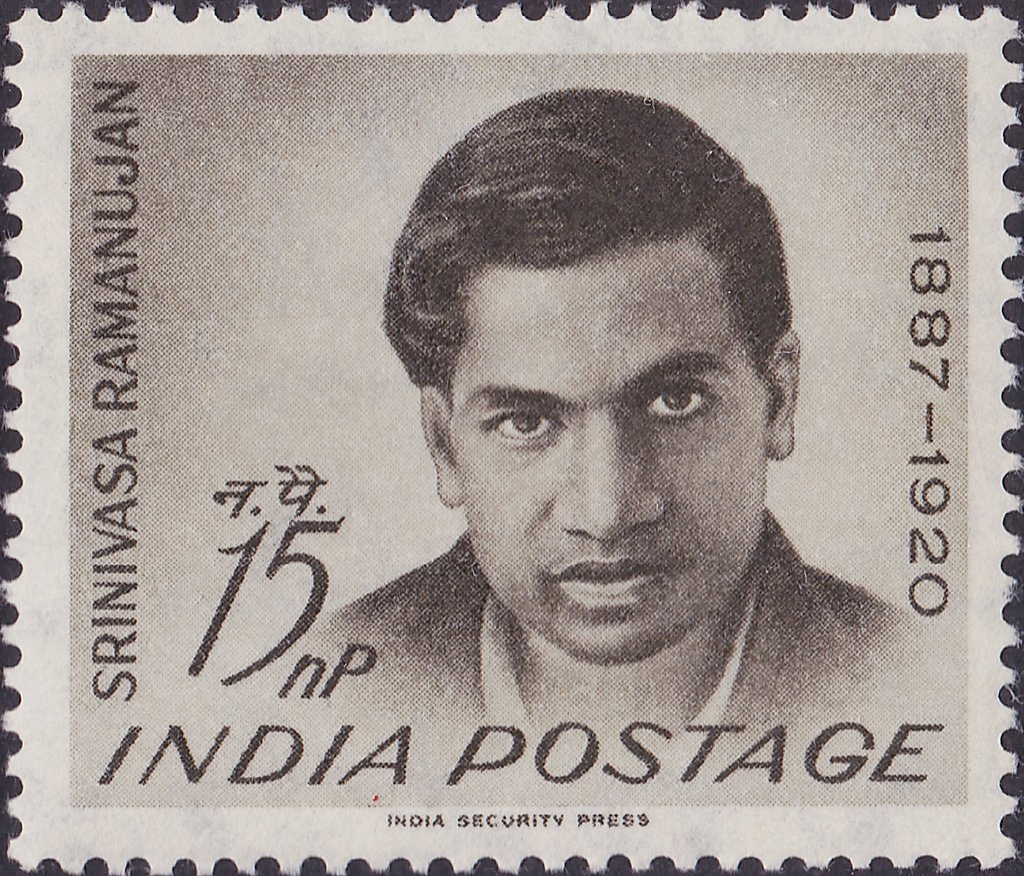
1962

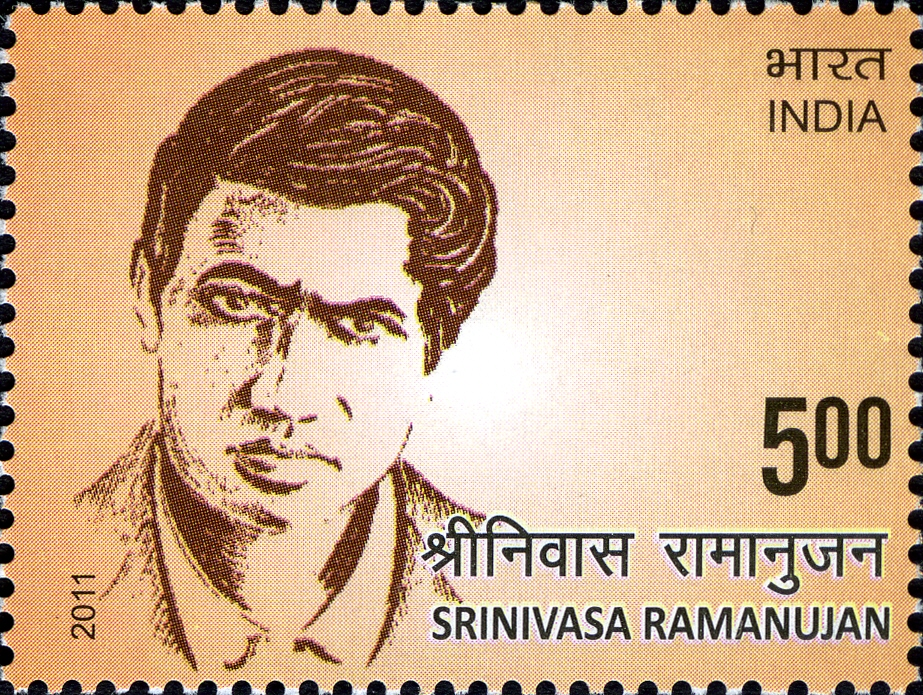
2011

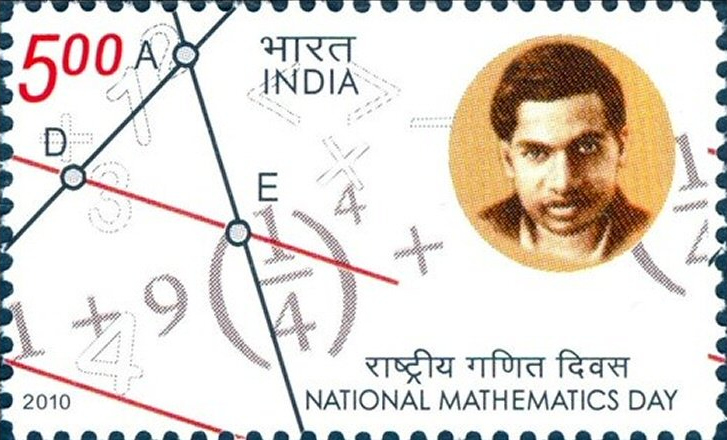
2012

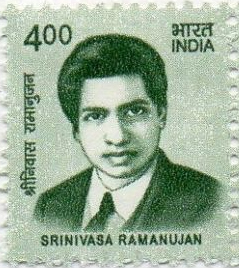
2016

== In popular culture ==
- The Man Who Loved Numbers is a 1988 PBS NOVA documentary about Ramanujan (S15, E9).
- The Man Who Knew Infinity is a 2015 film based on Kanigel's book of the same name. British actor Dev Patel portrays Ramanujan.
- Ramanujan, an Indo-British collaboration film chronicling Ramanujan's life, was released in 2014 by the independent film company Camphor Cinema. The cast and crew include director Gnana Rajasekaran, cinematographer Sunny Joseph and editor B. Lenin. Indian and English stars Abhinay Vaddi, Suhasini Maniratnam, Bhama, Kevin McGowan and Michael Lieber star in pivotal roles.
- Nandan Kudhyadi directed the Indian documentary films The Genius of Srinivasa Ramanujan (2013) and Srinivasa Ramanujan: The Mathematician and His Legacy (2016) about the mathematician.
- Ramanujan (The Man Who Reshaped 20th Century Mathematics), an Indian docudrama film directed by Akashdeep released in 2018.
- M. N. Krish's thriller novel The Steradian Trail weaves Ramanujan and his accidental discovery into its plot connecting religion, mathematics, finance and economics.
- Partition, a play by Ira Hauptman about Hardy and Ramanujan, was first performed in 2013.
- The play First Class Man by Alter Ego Productions was based on David Freeman's First Class Man. The play centres around Ramanujan and his complex and dysfunctional relationship with Hardy. On 16 October 2011 it was announced that Roger Spottiswoode, best known for his James Bond film Tomorrow Never Dies, is working on the film version, starring Siddharth.
- A Disappearing Number is a British stage production by the company Complicité that explores the relationship between Hardy and Ramanujan.
- David Leavitt's novel The Indian Clerk explores the events following Ramanujan's letter to Hardy.
- Google honoured Ramanujan on his 125th birth anniversary by replacing its logo with a doodle on its home page.
- Ramanujan was mentioned in the 1997 film Good Will Hunting, in a scene where professor Gerald Lambeau (Stellan Skarsgård) explains to Sean Maguire (Robin Williams) the genius of Will Hunting (Matt Damon) by comparing him to Ramanujan.
- In the television series Numbers, the character Amita Ramanujan (Navi Rawat) was named after Srinivasa.

== Selected papers ==
- Ramanujan, S. (1914). "Some definite integrals". Messenger Math. 44: 10–18.
- Ramanujan, S. (1914). "Some definite integrals connected with Gauss's sums". Messenger Math. 44: 75–85.
- Ramanujan, S. (1915). "On certain infinite series". Messenger Math. 45: 11–15.
- Ramanujan, S. (1915). "Highly Composite Numbers". Proceedings of the London Mathematical Society. 14 (1): 347–409. doi:10.1112/plms/s2_14.1.347.
- Ramanujan, S. (1915). "On the number of divisors of a number". The Journal of the Indian Mathematical Society. 7 (4): 131–133.
- Ramanujan, S. (1915). "Short Note: On the sum of the square roots of the first n natural numbers". The Journal of the Indian Mathematical Society. 7 (5): 173–175.
- Ramanujan, S. (1916). "Some formulae in the analytical theory of numbers". Messenger Math. 45: 81–84.
- Ramanujan, S. (1916). "A Series for Euler's Constant γ". Messenger Math. 46: 73–80.
- Ramanujan, S. (1917). "On the expression of numbers in the form ax^{2} + by^{2} + cz^{2} + du^{2}". Mathematical Proceedings of the Cambridge Philosophical Society. 19: 11–21.
- Hardy, G. H.; Ramanujan, S. (1917). "Asymptotic Formulae for the Distribution of Integers of Various Types". Proceedings of the London Mathematical Society. 16 (1): 112–132. doi:10.1112/plms/s2-16.1.112.
- Hardy, G. H.; Ramanujan, S. (1918). "Asymptotic Formulae in Combinatory Analysis". Proceedings of the London Mathematical Society. 17 (1): 75–115. doi:10.1112/plms/s2-17.1.75.
- Hardy, G. H.; Ramanujan, S. (1918). "On the coefficients in the expansions of certain modular functions". Proc. R. Soc. A. 95 (667): 144–155. Bibcode:1918RSPSA..95..144H. doi:10.1098/rspa.1918.0056.
- Ramanujan, S. (1919). "Some definite integrals". The Journal of the Indian Mathematical Society. 11 (2): 81–88.
- Ramanujan, S. (1919). "A proof of Bertrand's postulate". The Journal of the Indian Mathematical Society. 11 (5): 181–183.
- Ramanujan, S. (1920). "A class of definite integrals". Quart. J. Pure. Appl. Math. 48: 294–309. hdl:2027/uc1.$b417568.
- Ramanujan, S. (1921). "Congruence properties of partitions". Math. Z. 9 (1–2): 147–153. doi:10.1007/BF01378341. S2CID 121753215. Posthumously published extract of a longer, unpublished manuscript.

== Further works of Ramanujan's mathematics ==
- Andrews, George E.; Berndt, Bruce C. (2005). Ramanujan's Lost Notebook: Part I. Springer. ISBN 0-387-25529-X.
- Andrews, George E.; Berndt, Bruce C. (2008). Ramanujan's Lost Notebook: Part II. Springer. ISBN 978-0-387-77765-8.
- Andrews, George E.; Berndt, Bruce C. (2012). Ramanujan's Lost Notebook: Part III. Springer. ISBN 978-1-4614-3809-0.
- Andrews, George E.; Berndt, Bruce C. (2013). Ramanujan's Lost Notebook: Part IV. Springer. ISBN 978-1-4614-4080-2.
- Andrews, George E.; Berndt, Bruce C. (2018). Ramanujan's Lost Notebook: Part V. Springer. ISBN 978-3-319-77832-7.
- Chaudhary, M. P. (2008). "A simple solution of some integrals given by Srinivasa Ramanujan". Resonance: Journal of Science Education. Indian Academy of Sciences.
- Chaudhary, M. P. (2012). "Mock theta functions to mock theta conjectures". Scientia, Series A: Mathematical Sciences (22): 33–46.
- Chaudhary, M. P. (2016). "On modular relations for the Roger-Ramanujan type identities". Pacific Journal of Applied Mathematics. 7 (3): 177–184.

== Selected publications on Ramanujan and his work ==
- Alladi, Krishnaswami; Elliott, P. D. T. A.; Granville, A. (30 September 1998). Analytic and Elementary Number Theory: A Tribute to Mathematical Legend Paul Erdos. Springer Science & Business. ISBN 978-0-79238273-7.
- Baaquie, Belal E.; Willeboordse, Frederick H. (1 December 2009). Exploring Integrated Science. CRC Press. ISBN 978-1-4200-8794-9.
- Bell, E. T. (1928). Hardy, G. H.; Seshu Aiyar, P. V.; Wilson, B. M. (eds.). "Collected Papers of Srinivasa Ramanujan". Bulletin of the American Mathematical Society. 34 (6): 783–784. doi:10.1090/S0002-9904-1928-04651-7.
- Berndt, Bruce C. (1985). Ramanujan's Notebooks: Part I. New York: Springer. ISBN 978-0-387-96110-1.
- Berndt, Bruce C. (1989). "Srinivasa Ramanujan". The American Scholar. 58 (2): 234–244. ISSN 0003-0937. JSTOR 41211668.
- Berndt, Bruce C. (1993). Ramanujan's Notebooks: Part IV. New York: Springer. ISBN 978-0-387-94109-7.
- Berndt, Bruce C. (1998). Butzer, P. L.; Oberschelp, W.; Jongen, H. Th. (eds.). Charlemagne and His Heritage: 1200 Years of Civilization and Science in Europe (PDF). Turnhout, Belgium: Brepols Verlag. pp. 119–146. ISBN 978-2-503-50673-9. Archived (PDF) from the original on 9 September 2004.
- Berndt, Bruce C. (1999). Ramanujan's Notebooks: Part II. New York: Springer. ISBN 978-0-387-96794-3.
- Berndt, Bruce C. (2004). Ramanujan's Notebooks: Part III. New York: Springer. ISBN 978-0-387-97503-0.
- Berndt, Bruce C. (2005). Ramanujan's Notebooks: Part V. New York: Springer. ISBN 978-0-387-94941-3.
- Berndt, Bruce C. (2006). Number Theory in the Spirit of Ramanujan. Vol. 9. Providence, Rhode Island: American Mathematical Society. ISBN 978-0-8218-4178-5.
- Berndt, Bruce C.; Rankin, Robert A. (1995). Ramanujan: Letters and Commentary. History of Mathematics. Vol. 9. Providence, Rhode Island: American Mathematical Society. ISBN 978-0-8218-0287-8.
- Berndt, Bruce C.; Rankin, Robert A. (August 2000). "The Books Studied by Ramanujan in India". The American Mathematical Monthly. 107 (7): 595–601. doi:10.1080/00029890.2000.12005244. ISSN 0002-9890.
- Berndt, Bruce C.; Rankin, Robert A. (2001). Ramanujan: Essays and Surveys. Vol. 22. Providence, Rhode Island: American Mathematical Society. ISBN 978-0-8218-2624-9.
- Bressoud, David (2006). "Review: Ramanujan's Lost Notebook, Part I, by George Andrews and Bruce C. Berndt" (PDF). Bulletin of the American Mathematical Society. New Series. 43 (4): 585–591. doi:10.1090/s0273-0979-06-01110-4. Archived (PDF) from the original on 23 June 2015.
- Bullough, V.L. (1990). "2. History in adult human sexual behavior with children and adolescents in Western societies". Pedophilia: Biosocial Dimensions. New York: Springer-Verlag. ISBN 978-1-46139684-0.
- Chaitin, Gregory (28 July 2007). "Less Proof, More Truth". New Scientist (2614). doi:10.1016/S0262-4079(07)61908-3.
- Chandrasekhar, S. (2001) [Papers deposited with the Royal Society, 18 August 1977]. "An Incident in the Life of S. Ramanujan F.R.S. Conversations with G.H. Hardy FRS & J.E. Littlewood FRS and their Sequel". In Berndt, Bruce C.; Rankin, Robert A. (eds.). Ramanujan: Essays and Surveys. Providence, Rhode Island: American Mathematical Society.
- Chaudhary, M. P. (2008). "A simple solution of some integrals given by Srinivasa Ramanujan" (PDF). Resonance. 13 (9): 882–884. Archived (PDF) from the original on 6 October 2018.
- Eysenck, Hans (1995). Genius. Cambridge University Press. ISBN 0-521-48508-8.
- "Rediscovering Ramanujan". Frontline. 16 (17). August 1999. Archived from the original on 25 September 2013.
- Gunn, J. W. C.; Savage, B. (1919). "Report on the treatment of Entamoeba histolytica infections". Journal of the Royal Army Medical Corps. 33 (5): 418–426. doi:10.1136/jramc-33-05-09.
- Hardy, G. H. (Godfrey Harold) (1910). Orders of Infinity: The 'Infinitärcalcül' of Paul Du Bois-Reymond.
- Hardy, G. H. (1920). "Obituary, S. Ramanujan". Nature. 105 (7): 494–495. Bibcode:1920Natur.105..494H. doi:10.1038/105494a0. S2CID 4174904.
- Hardy, G. H. (1921). "Obituary Notices: Srinivasa Ramanujan". Proceedings of the London Mathematical Society. 19. Archived from the original on 5 March 2016.
- Hardy, G. H. (March 1937). "The Indian Mathematician Ramanujan". The American Mathematical Monthly. 44 (3): 137–155. doi:10.2307/2301659. JSTOR 2301659.
- Hardy, Godfrey Harold (1940). Ramanujan: Twelve Lectures on Subjects Suggested by His Life and Work. Cambridge: Cambridge University Press. 3rd edition, 1978, corrected and reprinted by AMS Chelsea Publishing, 2021, ISBN 0-8218-2023-0.
- Hardy, G. H. (1978). Ramanujan. New York: Chelsea Pub. Co. ISBN 978-0-8284-0136-4.
- Hardy, G. H. (1979). Collected Papers of G. H. Hardy. Vol. 7. Oxford, England: Clarendon Press.
- Hardy, G. H. (1999). Ramanujan: Twelve Lectures on Subjects Suggested by His Life and Work. Providence, Rhode Island: American Mathematical Society. ISBN 978-0-8218-2023-0.
- Henderson, Harry (1995). Modern Mathematicians. New York: Facts on File Inc. ISBN 978-0-8160-3235-8.
- Herschfeld, Aaron (August 1935). "On Infinite Radicals". The American Mathematical Monthly. 42 (7): 419–429. doi:10.1080/00029890.1935.11987745. ISSN 0002-9890.
- Iwaniec, Henryk (1989). "The circle method and the Fourier coefficients of modular forms". Number theory and related topics (Bombay, 1988). Tata Inst. Fund. Res. Stud. Math. Vol. 12. Bombay: Tata Inst. Fund. Res. pp. 47–55. MR 1441326.
- Kanigel, Robert (1991). The Man Who Knew Infinity: a Life of the Genius Ramanujan. New York: Charles Scribner's Sons. ISBN 978-0-684-19259-8.
- Kanigel, Robert (2004). "Ramanujan, Srinivasa". Oxford Dictionary of National Biography (online ed.). Oxford University Press. doi:10.1093/ref:odnb/51582. (Subscription, Wikipedia Library access or UK public library membership required.)
- Kolata, Gina (19 June 1987). "Remembering a 'Magical Genius'". Science. New Series. 236 (4808): 1519–21. Bibcode:1987Sci...236.1519K. doi:10.1126/science.236.4808.1519. PMID 17835731.
- Langley, George J. (24 December 1921). "The Difficulties in Diagnosis And Treatment of Hepatic Abscess". British Medical Journal. 2 (3182): 1073–1074. doi:10.1136/bmj.2.3182.1073. JSTOR 20429465. PMC 2339657. PMID 20770524.
- Leavitt, David (2007). The Indian Clerk (paperback ed.). London: Bloomsbury. ISBN 978-0-7475-9370-6.
- Lloyd's Register of Shipping 1930 (PDF). 1930.
- McElroy, Tucker (2005). A to Z of mathematicians. Facts on File. ISBN 0-8160-5338-3.
- Narlikar, Jayant V. (2003). Scientific Edge: the Indian Scientist From Vedic to Modern Times. New Delhi, India: Penguin Books. ISBN 978-0-14-303028-7.
- "Calendar of Scientific Pioneers". Nature. 107 (2686): 252–254. 21 April 1921. Bibcode:1921Natur.107..252.. doi:10.1038/107252b0.
- Neville, Eric Harold (January 1921). "The Late Srinivasa Ramanujan". Nature. 106 (2673): 661–662. Bibcode:1921Natur.106..661N. doi:10.1038/106661b0. S2CID 4185656.
- Neville, Eric Harold (1942). "Srinivasa Ramanujan". Nature. 149 (3776): 292–293. Bibcode:1942Natur.149..292N. doi:10.1038/149292a0.
- Newman, James R., ed. (2000). The world of mathematics. Mineola, NY: Dover Publications. ISBN 978-0-486-41153-8. OCLC 43555029.
- Ono, Ken (June–July 2006). "Honoring a Gift from Kumbakonam" (PDF). Notices of the American Mathematical Society. 53 (6): 640–651. Archived (PDF) from the original on 21 June 2007.
- Ono, Ken; Aczel, Amir D. (13 April 2016). My Search for Ramanujan: How I Learned to Count. Springer. ISBN 978-3319255668.
- Ram, Suresh (1972). Srinivasa Ramanujan. New Delhi: National Book Trust.
- Ramanujan, Srinivasa (1916). "On certain arithmetical functions" (PDF). Transactions of the Cambridge Philosophical Society. XXII (9). Archived from the original (PDF) on 11 June 2016.
- Ramanujan, Srinivasa (1997). Nicolas, Jean-Louis; Robin, Guy (eds.). "Highly Composite Numbers" (PDF). The Ramanujan Journal. 1: 119–153.
- Ramaseshan, S. (1990). "Srinivasa Ramanujan". Current Science. 59 (24). Lecture delivered at the Ramanujan Centennial International Conference (15–18 December 1987) at Kumbakonam.
- Ranganathan, S. R. (1967). Ramanujan: The Man and the Mathematician. Bombay: Asia Publishing House. ISBN 978-0-210-22203-4.
- Rao, Calyampudi Radhakrishna (1997). Statistics and truth: putting chance to work. World Scientific. ISBN 978-981-02-3111-8.
- Ribet, Kenneth A. (December 2003). "Theater Review. Partition" (PDF). Notices of the AMS. 50 (1): 1407–1408. Archived (PDF) from the original on 6 October 2016.
- Sankaran, T. M. (2005). Srinivasa Ramanujan- Ganitha lokathile Mahaprathibha (Report) (in Malayalam). Kochi, India: Kerala Sasthra Sahithya Parishad.
- Seshu Iyer, P. V. (June 1920). "The Late Mr. S. Ramanujan, B.A., F.R.S.". Journal of the Indian Mathematical Society. 12 (3).
- Snow, C. P. (1966). Variety of Men. New York: Charles Scribner's Sons.
- Snow, C. P. (1967). Variety of Men. Macmillan. ISBN 978-0-333-08630-8.
- Srinivasan, P. K., ed. (1968). Ramanujan Memorial Number: Letters and Reminiscences. Madras: Muthialpet High School.
- Winnie, Wen-Ching (9 December 2019). "The Ramanujan conjecture and its applications". Philosophical Transactions of the Royal Society A: Mathematical, Physical and Engineering Sciences. 378 (2163). doi:10.1098/rsta.2018.0441. PMC 6939229. PMID 31813366.
- Young, D. A. B. (1994). "Ramanujan's illness". Notes and Records of the Royal Society of London. 48 (1): 107–119. doi:10.1098/rsnr.1994.0009. PMID 11615274. S2CID 33416179.

== Selected publications on works of Ramanujan ==
- Ramanujan, Srinivasa; Hardy, G. H.; Seshu Aiyar, P. V.; Wilson, B. M.; Berndt, Bruce C. (2000). Collected Papers of Srinivasa Ramanujan. AMS. ISBN 978-0-8218-2076-6.

This book was originally published in 1927 after Ramanujan's death. It contains the 37 papers published in professional journals by Ramanujan during his lifetime. The third reprint contains additional commentary by Bruce C. Berndt.

- S. Ramanujan (1957). Notebooks (2 Volumes). Bombay: Tata Institute of Fundamental Research.

These books contain photocopies of the original notebooks as written by Ramanujan.

- S. Ramanujan (1988). The Lost Notebook and Other Unpublished Papers. New Delhi: Narosa. ISBN 978-3-540-18726-4.

This book contains photocopies of the pages of the "Lost Notebook".

- "Problems posed by Ramanujan". Journal of the Indian Mathematical Society.
- S. Ramanujan (2012). Notebooks (2 Volumes). Bombay: Tata Institute of Fundamental Research.

This was produced from scanned and microfilmed images of the original manuscripts by expert archivists of Roja Muthiah Research Library, Chennai.

== See also ==
- 1729 – Natural number
- Brown numbers
- List of amateur mathematicians
- List of Indian mathematicians
- Ramanujan graph – Spectral graph theory concept
- Ramanujan summation – Mathematical techniques for summing divergent infinite series
- Ramanujan's constant
- Ramanujan's ternary quadratic form – Unique algebraic expression given by Srinivasa Ramanujan
- Rank of a partition – Term in number theory and combinatorics
