= Ramanujan summation =

Mathematical techniques for summing divergent infinite series

Ramanujan summation is a technique invented by the mathematician Srinivasa Ramanujan for assigning a value to divergent infinite series. Although the Ramanujan summation of a divergent series is not a sum in the traditional sense, it has properties that make it mathematically useful in the study of divergent infinite series, for which conventional summation is undefined.

== Summation ==
Since there are no properties of an entire sum, the Ramanujan summation functions as a property of partial sums. If we take the Euler–Maclaurin summation formula together with the correction rule using Bernoulli numbers, we see that:

$$\begin{align}
\frac 1 2 f(0) + f(1) + \cdots + f(n - 1) + \frac 1 2 f(n) &= \frac {f(0) + f(n)} {2} + \sum_{k=1}^{n-1} f(k) = \sum_{k=0}^{n} f(k) - \frac {f(0) + f(n)} {2} \\
&= \int_0^n f(x)\,dx + \sum_{k=1}^p \frac{B_{2k}}{(2k)!}\left[f^{(2k-1)}(n) - f^{(2k-1)}(0)\right] + R_p
\end{align}$$

Ramanujan wrote this again for different limits of the integral and the corresponding summation for the case in which p goes to infinity:

$$\sum_{k=a}^{x}f(k)=C+\int_a^x f(t)dt+\frac{1}{2}f(x)+\sum_{k=1}^{\infty}\frac{B_{2k}}{(2k)!}f^{(2k-1)}(x)$$

where C is a constant specific to the series and its analytic continuation and the limits on the integral were not specified by Ramanujan, but presumably they were as given above. Comparing both formulae and assuming that R tends to 0 as x tends to infinity, we see that, in a general case, for functions f(x) with no divergence at x = 0:

$$C(a)=\int_0^a f(t)\,dt - \frac 1 2 f(0)-\sum_{k=1}^\infty \frac{B_{2k}}{(2k)!}f^{(2k-1)}(0)$$

where Ramanujan assumed $a = 0$. By taking $a= \infty$ we normally recover the usual summation for convergent series. For functions f(x) with no divergence at x = 1, we obtain:

$$C(a) = \int_1^a f(t)\,dt+ \frac{1}{2}f(1) - \sum_{k=1}^\infty \frac{B_{2k}}{(2k)!} f^{(2k-1)}(1)$$

alternatively, applying smoothed sums.

The convergent version of summation for functions with appropriate growth condition is then:

$$f(1)+f(2)+f(3)+\cdots=-\frac{f(0)} 2 + i\int_0^\infty \frac{f(it)-f(-it)}{e^{2\pi t}-1} \, dt$$

== Ramanujan summation of divergent series ==
In the following text, $(\mathfrak{R})$ indicates "Ramanujan summation". This formula originally appeared in one of Ramanujan's notebooks, without any notation to indicate that it exemplified a novel method of summation.

For example, the $(\mathfrak{R})$ of 1 − 1 + 1 − ⋯ is:

$$1 - 1 + 1 - \cdots = \frac 1 2\quad (\mathfrak{R}).$$

Ramanujan had calculated "sums" of known divergent series. It is important to mention that the Ramanujan sums are not the sums of the series in the usual sense, i.e. the partial sums do not converge to this value, which is denoted by the symbol $(\mathfrak{R})$. In particular, the $(\mathfrak{R})$ sum of 1 + 2 + 3 + 4 + ··· was calculated as:

$$1+2+3+\cdots = -\frac{1}{12} \quad (\mathfrak{R})$$

Extending to positive even powers, this gave:

$$1 + 2^{2k} + 3^{2k} + \cdots = 0\quad (\mathfrak{R})$$

and for odd powers the approach suggested a relation with the Bernoulli numbers:

$$1+2^{2k-1}+3^{2k-1}+\cdots = -\frac{B_{2k}}{2k}\quad (\mathfrak{R})$$

It has been proposed to use of C(1) rather than C(0) as the result of Ramanujan's summation, since then it can be assured that one series $\textstyle \sum_{k=1}^{\infty}f(k)$ admits one and only one Ramanujan's summation, defined as the value in 1 of the only solution of the difference equation $R(x) - R(x + 1) = f(x)$ that verifies the condition $\textstyle \int_1^2 R(t)\,dt = 0$.

This demonstration of Ramanujan's summation (denoted as $\textstyle\sum_{n \ge 1}^{\mathfrak{R}} f(n)$) does not coincide with the earlier defined Ramanujan's summation, C(0), nor with the summation of convergent series, but it has interesting properties, such as: If R(x) tends to a finite limit when x → 1, then the series $\textstyle\sum_{n \ge 1}^{\mathfrak{R}} f(n)$ is convergent, and we have

$$\sum_{n \ge 1}^{\mathfrak{R}} f(n) = \lim_{N \to \infty} \left[\sum_{n = 1}^{N}f(n) - \int_1^N f(t)\,dt\right]$$

In particular, we have

$$\sum_{n \ge 1}^\mathfrak{R} \frac{1}{n} = \gamma$$

where $\gamma$ is the Euler–Mascheroni constant.

== Extension to integrals ==
Ramanujan resummation can be extended to integrals; for example, using the Euler–Maclaurin summation formula, one can write

$$\begin{align}
\int_a^\infty x^{m-s} \, dx &= \frac{m-s}{2} \int_a^\infty  \, dx + \zeta (s-m)-\sum_{i=1}^a \left[i^{m-s} +a^{m-s}\right]\\
&\qquad -\sum_{r=1}^\infty \frac{B_{2r} \theta (m-s+1)}{(2r)!\Gamma (m-2r+2-s)} (m-2r+1-s) \int_a^\infty x^{m-2r-s} \, dx
\end{align}$$

which is the natural extension to integrals of the zeta regularization algorithm.

This recurrence equation is finite, since for $m-2r < -1$,

$$\int_a^\infty dx \, x^{m-2r}= -\frac{a^{m-2r+1}}{m-2r+1} .$$

Note that this involves Zeta function regularization

$$I(n, \Lambda) = \int_0^\Lambda dx \, x^n .$$

With $\Lambda \to \infty$, the application of this Ramanujan resummation lends to finite results in the renormalization of quantum field theories.

== See also ==
- Abel–Plana formula
- Borel summation
- Cesàro summation
- Divergent series
- Ramanujan's sum
