= Ramanujan's lost notebook =

Collection of Srinivasa Ramanujan's discoveries in mathematics

Ramanujan's lost notebook is the manuscript in which the Indian mathematician Srinivasa Ramanujan recorded the mathematical discoveries of the last year (1919–1920) of his life. Its whereabouts were unknown to all but a few mathematicians until it was rediscovered by George Andrews in 1976, in a box of effects of G. N. Watson stored at the Wren Library at Trinity College, Cambridge. The "notebook" is not a book, but consists of loose and unordered sheets of paper described as "more than one hundred pages written on 138 sides in Ramanujan's distinctive handwriting. The sheets contained over six hundred mathematical formulas listed consecutively without proofs."

George Andrews and Bruce C. Berndt (2005, 2009, 2012, 2013, 2018) have published several books in which they give proofs for Ramanujan's formulas included in the notebook. According to Berndt, "The discovery of this 'Lost Notebook' caused roughly as much stir in the mathematical world as the discovery of Beethoven’s tenth symphony would cause in the musical world."

== History ==
After Ramanujan died on April 26, 1920, at the age of 32, his wife gave his notebooks to the University of Madras. On August 30, 1923, the registrar Francis Drewsbury sent much of this material to G. H. Hardy, Ramanujan's mentor at Trinity College, where he probably received the manuscripts of the lost notebook.

... Almost surely, this manuscript, or at least most of it, was written during the last year of Ramanujan's life, after his return to India from England. ... The manuscript contains no introduction or covering letter. In fact, there are hardly any words in the manuscript. There are a few marks evidently made by a cataloguer, and there are a few remarks in the handwriting of G. H. Hardy. Undoubtedly, the most famous objects examined in the lost notebook are the mock theta functions ...

Some time between 1934 and 1947, Hardy probably passed the notebook on to G. N. Watson, who with B. M. Wilson started on the project of editing Ramanujan's notebooks. However, Wilson died in 1935 and Watson seems to have lost interest in the project in the late 1930s. After Watson's death in 1965, J. M. Whittaker examined Watson's papers (which were in disarray, covered a room floor to a depth of one foot, and due to be incinerated in a few days) and by luck found Ramanujan's notebook, which he and R. A. Rankin sent to Trinity College Wren library on December 26, 1968. George Andrews (1986, section 1.5), following a suggestion by Lucy Slater, found the lost notebook in the spring of 1976 while on a visit to Trinity College. It was published on December 22, 1987, by Narosa publishing house.

=== Andrews's account of the discovery ===
George Andrews, an American mathematician, wrote in 2012 an account of the discovery for the 125th celebration of Ramanujan's birth. In his account, Andrews states that he was already an advanced researcher in fields, such as mock theta functions and hypergeometric series, related closely to works of Ramanujan. In 1970, anticipating a sabbatical, he wrote to British mathematician Lucy Slater. Slater "intriguingly" stated in her reply that she had inherited a "great collection" of papers from mathematicians such as Watson, Bailey, Jackson and Rogers, which were unsorted, including one of the last by Ramanujan. She also mentioned other papers were held by the Trinity College library.

Although unable to travel to Europe in 1970, Andrews became able to do so in 1976, when he was due to attend a European conference in Strasbourg, near the Franco-German border. He obtained permission and support from Slater, from the Trinity College library, and from his professor, Ben Noble, to visit Cambridge after the conference, in order to investigate the "invaluable" unpublished writings of Watson et al. Noble agreed, adding that if he could attempt to find a lost paper by James Clerk Maxwell at the same time, it would be appreciated. The library's documents included a list of matters held from Watson's estate. The list included the item: "A 139 page manuscript by S. Ramanujan on q-series", containing the work from Ramanujan's final year.

Although not labelled as such, the identity of the papers was settled because Ramanujan's final letters to Hardy had referred to the discovery of what Ramanujan called mock theta functions, although without great detail, and the manuscript included what appeared to be his full notes on these.

== Contents ==
Rankin (1989) described the lost notebook in detail. The majority of the formulas are about q-series and mock theta functions, about a third are about modular equations and singular moduli, and the remaining formulas are mainly about integrals, Dirichlet series, congruences, and asymptotics. The mock theta functions in the notebook have been found to be useful for calculating the entropy of black holes.
