= Ramanujan's ternary quadratic form =

Unique algebraic expression given by Srinivasa Ramanujan

In number theory, a branch of mathematics, Ramanujan's ternary quadratic form is the algebraic expression x^{2} + y^{2} + 10z^{2} with integral values for x, y and z. Srinivasa Ramanujan considered this expression in a footnote in a paper published in 1916 and briefly discussed the representability of integers in this form. After giving necessary and sufficient conditions that an integer cannot be represented in the form ax^{2} + by^{2} + cz^{2} for certain specific values of a, b and c, Ramanujan observed in a footnote: "(These) results may tempt us to suppose that there are similar simple results for the form ax^{2} + by^{2} + cz^{2} whatever are the values of a, b and c. It appears, however, that in most cases there are no such simple results." To substantiate this observation, Ramanujan discussed the form which is now referred to as Ramanujan's ternary quadratic form.

== Properties discovered by Ramanujan ==
In his 1916 paper Ramanujan made the following observations about the form x^{2} + y^{2} + 10z^{2}.

- The even numbers that are not of the form x^{2} + y^{2} + 10z^{2} are 4^{λ}(16μ + 6).
- The odd numbers that are not of the form x^{2} + y^{2} + 10z^{2}, viz. 3, 7, 21, 31, 33, 43, 67, 79, 87, 133, 217, 219, 223, 253, 307, 391, ... do not seem to obey any simple law.

== Odd numbers beyond 391 ==
By putting an ellipsis at the end of the list of odd numbers not representable as x^{2} + y^{2} + 10z^{2}, Ramanujan indicated that his list was incomplete. It was not clear whether Ramanujan intended it to be a finite list or infinite list. This prompted others to look for such odd numbers. In 1927, Burton W. Jones and Gordon Pall discovered that the number 679 could not be expressed in the form x^{2} + y^{2} + 10z^{2} and they also verified that there were no other such numbers below 2000. This led to an early conjecture that the seventeen numbers – the sixteen numbers in Ramanujan's list and the number discovered by them – were the only odd numbers not representable as x^{2} + y^{2} + 10z^{2}. However, in 1941, H Gupta showed that the number 2719 could not be represented as x^{2} + y^{2} + 10z^{2}. He also verified that there were no other such numbers below 20000. Further progress in this direction took place only after the development of modern computers. W. Galway wrote a computer program to determine odd integers not expressible as x^{2} + y^{2} + 10z^{2}. Galway verified that there are only eighteen numbers less than 2 × 10^{10} not representable in the form x^{2} + y^{2} + 10z^{2}. Based on Galway's computations, Ken Ono and K. Soundararajan formulated the following conjecture:

The odd positive integers which are not of the form x^{2} + y^{2} + 10z^{2} are: 3, 7, 21, 31, 33, 43, 67, 79, 87, 133, 217, 219, 223, 253, 307, 391, 679, 2719.

== Some known results ==
The conjecture of Ken Ono and Soundararajan has not been fully resolved. However, besides the results enunciated by Ramanujan, a few more general results about the form have been established. The proofs of some of them are quite simple while those of the others involve quite complicated concepts and arguments.

- Every integer of the form 10n + 5 is represented by Ramanujan's ternary quadratic form.
- If n is an odd integer which is not square-free then it can be represented in the form x^{2} + y^{2} + 10z^{2}.
- There are only a finite number of odd integers which cannot be represented in the form x^{2} + y^{2} + 10z^{2}.
- If the generalized Riemann hypothesis is true, then the conjecture of Ono and Soundararajan is also true.
- Ramanujan's ternary quadratic form is not regular in the sense of L.E. Dickson.
