= The Ramanujan Journal =

- Discipline: Mathematics
- Language: English
- Edited by: Krishnaswami Alladi and Ken Ono

Publication details
- History: 1997-present
- Publisher: Springer Science+Business Media
- Frequency: 9/year
- Impact factor: 0.804 (2020)

Standard abbreviations
- ISO 4: Ramanujan J.

Indexing
- CODEN: RAJOF9
- ISSN: 1382-4090 (print); 1572-9303 (web)
- LCCN: sn98030205
- OCLC no.: 36392470

Links
- Journal homepage; Online archive

The Ramanujan Journal is a peer-reviewed scientific journal covering all areas of mathematics, especially those influenced by the Indian mathematician Srinivasa Ramanujan. The journal was established in 1997 and is published by Springer Science+Business Media. According to the Journal Citation Reports, the journal has a 2021 impact factor of 0.804.
