= Amanda Folsom =

American mathematician

Amanda L. Folsom (born 1979) is an American mathematician specializing in analytic number theory and its applications in combinatorics. She is a professor of mathematics at Amherst College, where she chairs the department of mathematics and statistics.

== Education and career ==
Folsom graduated from the University of Chicago with honors in mathematics in 2001. She completed her Ph.D. in 2006 at the University of California, Los Angeles. Her dissertation, Modular Units, was supervised by William Duke.

After postdoctoral research at the Max Planck Institute for Mathematics from 2006 to 2007, and at the University of Wisconsin–Madison from 2007 to 2010, she joined the Yale University mathematics faculty in 2010. She moved to Amherst College in 2014. In 2018–2019 she was a von Neumann Fellow at the Institute for Advanced Study.

== Contributions ==
With Ken Ono, Jan Hendrik Bruinier, and Zach Kent, Folsom participated in the discovery of a fractal structure in the partition function that allows any particular value of the function to be computed exactly by a finite formula.

Folsom and Ono are the namesakes of the Folsom–Ono grid, constructed from two sequences of Poincaré series that define weak harmonic Maass forms and modular forms. The coefficients of these series can be arranged in a two-dimensional grid, and in a 2008 paper, Folsom and Ono conjectured that the values in this grid are all integers. This conjecture was later proven by others. Folsom is also known for her research with Ono and R. C. Rhoades refining results of Srinivasa Ramanujan on mock modular forms.

With Kathrin Bringmann, Ken Ono, and Larry Rolen, Folsom is one of the authors of the book Harmonic Maass Forms and Mock Modular Forms: Theory and Applications (Colloquium Publications 64, American Mathematical Society, 2018).

== Recognition ==
Folsom is the winner of the 2021 Mary P. Dolciani Prize for Excellence in Research, given by the American Mathematical Society. The award was for "her outstanding record of research in analytic and algebraic number theory, with applications to combinatorics and Lie theory, for her work with undergraduate students, and for her service to the profession, including her work to promote success of women in mathematics".

Her book Harmonic Maass Forms and Mock Modular Forms won the 2018 Prose Award for Best Scholarly Book in Mathematics from the Association of American Publishers.
