= Bringmann =

Bringmann is a German surname. Notable people with the surname include:

- Kathrin Bringmann (born 1977), German number theorist
- Klaus Bringmann (1936–2021), German historian, author, and professor
- Steffen Bringmann (born 1964), East German sprinter
