= The Man Who Knew Infinity =

2015 film by Matthew Brown

- Theatrical release poster
- Directed by: Matthew Brown
- Screenplay by: Matthew Brown
- Based on: The Man Who Knew Infinity by Robert Kanigel
- Produced by: Edward R. Pressman; Jim Young; Joe Thomas
- Starring: Dev Patel; Jeremy Irons; Devika Bhise; Toby Jones; Stephen Fry; Jeremy Northam; Kevin McNally; Enzo Cilenti; Arundhati Nag; Dhritiman Chatterjee
- Cinematography: Larry Smith
- Edited by: JC Bond
- Music by: Coby Brown
- Production companies: Pressman Film; Xeitgeist Entertainment Group; Cayenne Pepper Productions
- Distributed by: Warner Bros. Pictures (United Kingdom); Mister Smith Entertainment (International)
- Release dates: 17 September 2015 (TIFF); 8 April 2016 (United Kingdom)
- Running time: 108 minutes
- Country: United Kingdom
- Language: English
- Budget: $10 million
- Box office: $12.3 million

The Man Who Knew Infinity is a 2015 British biographical drama film about the Indian mathematician Srinivasa Ramanujan, based on the 1991 book of the same name by Robert Kanigel.

The film stars Dev Patel as Srinivasa Ramanujan, a real-life mathematician who, after growing up poor in Madras, India, earns admittance to Cambridge University during World War I, where he becomes a pioneer in mathematical theories with the guidance of English mathematician and fellow collaborator, G. H. Hardy, portrayed by Jeremy Irons.

Filming began in August 2014 at Trinity College, Cambridge after eight years in development. The film had its world premiere as a gala presentation at the 2015 Toronto International Film Festival, and was selected as the opening gala of the 2015 Zurich Film Festival. It also played other film festivals including Singapore International Film Festival and Dubai International Film Festival.

== Plot ==
At the turn of the twentieth century, Srinivasa Ramanujan is a struggling and indigent citizen in the city of Madras in India working at menial jobs at the edge of poverty. While performing his menial labour, his employers notice that he seems to have exceptional skills in mathematics and they begin to make use of him for rudimentary accounting tasks. It becomes equally clear to his employers, who are college-educated, that Ramanujan's mathematical insights exceed the simple accounting tasks they are assigning to him and soon they encourage him to make his personal writings in mathematics available to the general public and to start to contact professors of mathematics at universities by writing to them. One such letter is sent to G. H. Hardy, a famous mathematician at University of Cambridge, who begins to take a special interest in Ramanujan.

Hardy soon invites Ramanujan to Cambridge to test his mettle as a potential theoretical mathematician. Ramanujan is overwhelmed by the opportunity and decides to pursue Hardy's offer, even though this means he must leave his wife Janaki for an extended period. He parts lovingly with Janaki and promises to keep up his correspondence with her.

Upon arrival at Cambridge, Ramanujan encounters various forms of racial prejudice and finds his adjustment to life in England more difficult than expected. Hardy, though much impressed by Ramanujan's abilities, remains concerned about Ramanujan's ability to communicate effectively due to his lack of experience in writing proofs, but with perseverance, he manages to get Ramanujan published in a major journal. In the meantime, Ramanujan is diagnosed with tuberculosis and his frequent letters home to his wife remain unanswered after many months. Hardy continues to see much more promise in Ramanujan. However, he remains unaware of the personal difficulties his student is having with his housing and with his lack of contact with his family back home in India. Ramanujan's health worsens while he continues delving into deeper and more profound research interests in mathematics under the guidance of Hardy and others at Cambridge.

Janaki, after much elapsed time, wonders why she has not heard from Ramanujan and eventually discovers that his mother has been intercepting his letters, and withholding hers to him. Hardy makes special efforts to get Ramanujan's now recognisably exceptional mathematical skills accepted by the university, by nominating Ramanujan for a fellowship of Trinity College. At first, Hardy fails for reasons related to college politics and racial prejudice. By gaining the support of key members of the college, Hardy again successfully nominates Ramanujan as a Fellow of the Royal Society, thereby forcing his acceptance as a fellow of Trinity. Ramanujan is eventually reunited with his family in India, though his declining health, exacerbated by poor housing and harsh winter weather in England, ultimately takes its toll and leads to his death aged 32, soon after his recognition as a mathematician of international merit and importance.

== Cast ==
- Dev Patel as Srinivasa Ramanujan
- Jeremy Irons as G. H. Hardy
- Malcolm Sinclair as Professor Cartwright
- Raghuvir Joshi as Narasimha
- Dhritiman Chatterjee as Narayana Iyer
- Stephen Fry as Sir Francis Spring
- Arundathi Nag as Komalatammal
- Devika Bhise as Janaki
- Pádraic Delaney as Beglan
- Toby Jones as John Edensor Littlewood
- Jeremy Northam as Bertrand Russell
- Sam Shella as Dr. Muthu
- Richard Cunningham as Hobson
- Thomas Bewley as Baker
- Anthony Calf as Robert Alfred Herman
- Richard Johnson as Vice Master Henry Jackson
- Kevin McNally as Major Percy Alexander MacMahon
- Enzo Cilenti as Doctor
- Shazad Latif as Prasanta Chandra Mahalanobis
- Christopher Ravenscroft as J. J. Thomson

While Irons is more than 40 years Patel's senior, the real Hardy was only 10 years older than Ramanujan.

== Production ==
Director Matthew Brown based the film on the 1991 biography The Man Who Knew Infinity. He proposed creating a period piece about Srinivasa Ramanujan to producer Edward R. Pressman. Pressman, who also included producers Sofia Sondervan and Jim Young in developing the film, acquired film rights to the book in 2006. Brown planned to begin production within the year. Pressmanthen intended to begin production of his film in 2008. Scriptwriting for The Man Who Knew Infinity was done by 2013, and was undergoing pre-production by June.

Several films about Ramanujan were also conceptualized during the production of the film. In 2006, Stephen Fry and Dev Benegal also announced that they would co-direct in Ramanujan, a separate film. In early 2010, Indian director Rohit Jugraj announced his film Ramanujan, which was on work for two years. In 2011, Roger Spottiswoode announced that his script for A First Class Man, a film on Ramanujan, was complete and planned filming the following year. Spottiswoode selected Indian actor Siddharth to play as Ramanujan.

R. Madhavan was initially selected to portray the lead role in the film after agreeing terms during January 2012, but the makers eventually decided they wanted an international actor to play Ramanujan. Patel's role was announced during the Cannes Film Festival in May 2013. The production then announced the role of Jeremy Irons as G. H. Hardy in December 2013. Stephen Fry, who had shelved his work on Ramanujan, was invited by Brown for an acting role. Fry would also go to Chennai for filming.

Principal photography took place after eight years in development. Filming locations include Chennai, Kumbakonam, and the Trinity College, Cambridge. Filming began at Trinity College on August 2014, followed by filming in India. The Man Who Knew Infinity was the first film to shoot at Trinity College. The scene of Ramanujan's departure to England was filmed in Pondicherry. One deleted scene depicts Patel slipping down the bank of River Cam after seeing a punt race. Sound engineer Sai Shravanam was commissioned as a music producer for the film.

The film marked the final performance of veteran actor Richard Johnson, who died in 2015.

== Release ==
The film was in post-production by 2014 and set for a 2015 release. The Man Who Knew Infinity had its world premiere in the Toronto International Film Festival on 17 September 2015. It was also the opening film for the 11th Zurich Film Festival and the 46th International Film Festival of India. Mister Smith Entertainment handled international sales of the film. Warner Bros. released the film in the United Kingdom on 8 April 2016. IFC Films released it in the U.S. on 29 April 2016. The film was theatrically released in India on 29 April.

== Reception ==
Film review aggregator Rotten Tomatoes reports that 62% of critics gave the film a positive rating, based on 129 reviews with an average score of 6.1/10. The critics' consensus reads: "The Man Who Knew Infinity might be a tad too conventional to truly do its subject justice, but Dev Patel and Jeremy Irons elevate the end result beyond mere biopic formula." Metacritic, which uses a weighted average, assigned a score of 56 out of 100 based on 26 critics, indicating "mixed or average reviews".

After the film's world premiere, Allan Hunter in Screen Daily found the film to be "a well-heeled, sincere production following the memories of Ramanujan's English mentor and friend ... The film tells such a good story that it is hard to resist. The old-fashioned virtues of a well-told tale and a particularly fine performance from Jeremy Irons should endear the film to that supposedly under-served older demographic who like to turn out for a weekday matinee ... Mathematics plays a key role in the story, but in a way that is entirely accessible, allowing the viewer to comprehend the advances that Ramanujan made and why his legacy remains so important almost a century after his death." Deborah Young in The Hollywood Reporter found the film to be a "respectable but all too conventional biopic".

Mathematicians Ken Ono and Manjul Bhargava collaborated on the film, which has been praised by mathematicians and scientists for its accurate mathematics and authentic portrayal of mathematicians. George E. Andrews, former President of the American Mathematical Society, praised the film for its moving portrayal of the deep relationship between Ramanujan and Hardy. The London Mathematical Society proclaimed that the film "outshines Good Will Hunting in almost every way". Reviewing the film for Nature, Andrew Robinson wrote that "the film took more than ten years to create. It is worth the wait."

== See also ==
- Ramanujan – a 2014 Indian biopic of Ramanujan
- List of films about mathematicians
