= Harmonic Maass form =

Mathematical function

In mathematics, a weak Maass form is a smooth function $f$ on the upper half plane, transforming like a modular form under the action of the modular group, being an eigenfunction of the corresponding hyperbolic Laplace operator, and having at most linear exponential growth at the cusps. If the eigenvalue of $f$ under the Laplacian is zero, then $f$ is called a harmonic weak Maass form, or briefly a harmonic Maass form.

A weak Maass form which has actually moderate growth at the cusps is a classical Maass wave form.

The Fourier expansions of harmonic Maass forms often encode interesting combinatorial, arithmetic, or geometric generating functions. Regularized theta lifts of harmonic Maass forms can be used to construct Arakelov Green functions for special divisors on orthogonal Shimura varieties.

== Definition ==
A complex-valued smooth function $f$ on the upper half-plane H = {z ∈ C: Im(z) > 0} is called a weak Maass form of integral weight k (for the group SL(2, Z)) if it satisfies the following three conditions:

(1) For every matrix
$$\begin{pmatrix}a & b \\ c & d \end{pmatrix}\in \text{SL}(2, \mathbf{Z})$$
the function $f$ satisfies the modular transformation law

$$f\left(\frac{az+b}{cz+d}\right) = (cz+d)^k f(z).$$

(2) $f$ is an eigenfunction of the weight k hyperbolic Laplacian

$$\Delta_k = -y^2\left( \frac{\partial^2}{\partial x^2}+ \frac{\partial^2}{\partial y^2}\right) + iky\left( \frac{\partial}{\partial x}+i \frac{\partial}{\partial y}\right),$$

where $z = x+iy.$

(3) $f$ has at most linear exponential growth at the cusp, that is, there exists a constant C > 0 such that f (z) = O(e^{Cy}) as $y \to \infty.$

If $f$ is a weak Maass form with eigenvalue 0 under $\Delta_k$, that is, if $\Delta_k f=0$, then $f$ is called a harmonic weak Maass form, or briefly a harmonic Maass form.

== Basic properties ==
Every harmonic Maass form $f$ of weight $k$ has a Fourier expansion of the form

$$f(z) = \sum\nolimits_{n\geq n^+} c^+(n)q^n + \sum\nolimits_{n\leq n^-} c^-(n)\Gamma(1-k,-4\pi n y) q^n,$$

where q = e^{2πiz}, and $n^+, n^-$ are integers depending on $f.$ Moreover,

$$\Gamma(s,y)=\int_y^\infty t^{s-1}e^{-t} dt$$

denotes the incomplete gamma function (which has to be interpreted appropriately when n=0 ). The first summand is called the holomorphic part, and the second summand is called the non-holomorphic part of $f.$

There is a complex anti-linear differential operator $\xi_k$ defined by

$$\xi_k(f)(z) = 2 i y^{k} \overline{\frac{\partial}{\partial \bar z}f(z)}.$$

Since $\Delta_k = -\xi_{2-k}\xi_k$, the image of a harmonic Maass form is weakly holomorphic. Hence, $\xi_k$ defines a map from the vector space $H_k$ of harmonic Maass forms of weight $k$ to the space $M_{2-k}^!$ of weakly holomorphic modular forms of weight $2-k.$ It was proved by Bruinier and Funke (for arbitrary weights, multiplier systems, and congruence subgroups) that this map is surjective. Consequently, there is an exact sequence

$$0\to M_{k}^! \to H_k\to M_{2-k}^!\to 0,$$

providing a link to the algebraic theory of modular forms. An important subspace of $H_k$ is the space $H_k^+$ of those harmonic Maass forms which are mapped to cusp forms under $\xi_k$.

If harmonic Maass forms are interpreted as harmonic sections of the line bundle of modular forms of weight $k$ equipped with the Petersson metric over the modular curve, then this differential operator can be viewed as a composition of the Hodge star operator and the antiholomorphic differential. The notion of harmonic Maass forms naturally generalizes to arbitrary congruence subgroups and (scalar and vector valued) multiplier systems.

== Examples ==
- Every weakly holomorphic modular form is a harmonic Maass form.
- The non-holomorphic Eisenstein series

$$E_2(z) = 1- \frac{3}{\pi y}-24\sum_{n=1}^\infty \sigma_1(n) q^n$$

of weight 2 is a harmonic Maass form of weight 2.

- Zagier's Eisenstein series E_{3/2} of weight 3/2 is a harmonic Maass form of weight 3/2 (for the group Γ_{0}(4)). Its image under $\xi_{3/2}$ is a non-zero multiple of the Jacobi theta function

$$\theta(z)=\sum_{n\in \Z} q^{n^2}.$$

- The derivative of the incoherent Eisenstein series of weight 1 associated to an imaginary quadratic order is a harmonic Maass forms of weight 1.
- A mock modular form is the holomorphic part of a harmonic Maass form.
- Poincaré series built with the M-Whittaker function are weak Maass forms. When the spectral parameter is specialized to the harmonic point they lead to harmonic Maass forms.
- The evaluation of the Weierstrass zeta function at the Eichler integral of the weight 2 new form corresponding to a rational elliptic curve E can be used to associate a weight 0 harmonic Maass form to E .
- The simultaneous generating series for the values on Heegner divisors and integrals along geodesic cycles of Klein's J-function (normalized such that the constant term vanishes) is a harmonic Maass form of weight 1/2.

== History ==
The above abstract definition of harmonic Maass forms together with a systematic investigation of their basic properties was first given by Bruinier and Funke. However, many examples, such as Eisenstein series and Poincaré series, had already been known earlier. Independently, Zwegers developed a theory of mock modular forms which also connects to harmonic Maass forms.

An algebraic theory of integral weight harmonic Maass forms in the style of Katz was developed by Candelori.

== Works cited ==
- Alfes, Claudia; Griffin, Michael; Ono, Ken; Rolen, Larry (2015). "Weierstrass mock modular forms and elliptic curves". Research in Number Theory. 1 (24). arXiv:1406.0443.
- Bruinier, Jan Hendrik; Funke, Jens (2004). "On two geometric theta lifts". Duke Mathematical Journal. 125 (1): 45–90. arXiv:math/0212286. doi:10.1215/S0012-7094-04-12513-8. ISSN 0012-7094. MR 2097357. S2CID 2078210.
- Candelori, Luca (2014). "Harmonic weak Maass forms: a geometric approach". Mathematische Annalen. 360 (1–2): 489–517. doi:10.1007/s00208-014-1043-5. S2CID 119474785.
- Duke, William; Imamoḡlu, Özlem; Tóth, Árpad (2011). "Cycle integrals of the j-function and mock modular forms". Annals of Mathematics. Second Series. 173 (2): 947–981. doi:10.4007/annals.2011.173.2.8.
- Fay, John (1977). "Fourier coefficients of the resolvent for a Fuchsian group". Journal für die reine und angewandte Mathematik. 294: 143–203.
- Hejhal, Dennis (1983). The Selberg Trace Formula for PSL(2,R). Lecture Notes in Mathematics. Vol. 1001. Springer-Verlag.
- Kudla, Steve; Rapoport, Michael; Yang, Tonghai (1999). "On the derivative of an Eisenstein series of weight one". International Mathematics Research Notices. 1999 (7): 347–385. doi:10.1155/S1073792899000185.
- Zagier, Don (1975). "Nombres de classes et formes modulaires de poids 3/2". Comptes Rendus de l'Académie des Sciences, Série A (in French). 281: 883–886.
- Zwegers, S.P. (2002). Mock Theta Functions (PhD thesis). University of Utrecht. ISBN 978-903933155-2.
