= Yuri Tschinkel =

Russian-German-American mathematician

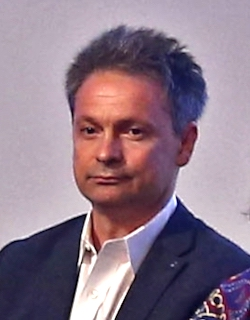
Yuri Tschinkel 2018 ICM by Pablo Costa

Yuri Tschinkel (Юрий Чинкель, born 31 May 1964 in Moscow) is a Russian-German-American mathematician, specializing in algebraic geometry, automorphic forms and number theory.

== Education and career ==
Tschinkel attended from 1979, the Erweiterte Oberschule Heinrich-Hertz-Gymnasium in East Berlin and passed there in 1983 the Abitur. He graduated with honors from Lomonosov Moscow State University in 1990 and received his doctorate in 1992 from the Massachusetts Institute of Technology with thesis Rational points on algebraic surfaces under the supervision of Yuri Manin and Michael Artin. From 1992 to 1995 Tschinkel was a junior fellow at Harvard University. In 1995 he became an assistant professor at the University of Illinois at Chicago (UIC) and from 1999 to 2003 he was an associate professor there. From 2003 to 2008 he was a professor at the University of Göttingen. He has been a professor at the Courant Institute of Mathematical Sciences of New York University since 2005 and, since 2012, director of the Simons Foundation's Department of Mathematics and Physics.

He has been a visiting scholar at the École Polytechnique, the Institut des hautes études scientifiques, the Max Planck Institute for Mathematics in Bonn, the Isaac Newton Institute at the University of Cambridge, Stanford University, Princeton University (1999 to 2003), Kyoto's Research Institute for Mathematical Sciences, and the University of Tokyo.

Tschinkel does research on rational points on algebraic varieties and other questions of arithmetic geometry. He is the author or co-author of over 110 research publications. He has been a co-editor of several anthologies and conference reports on arithmetic geometry, e.g., co-editor with William Duke of the Gauß–Dirichlet conference in Göttingen in 2005 and also co-editor with Yuri Zarhin of the Festschrift for his teacher Yuri Manin.

In 1995–1996 Tschinkel was a Leibniz Fellow of the European Union at the École normale supérieure in Paris, and in 2001–2002 he was Clay Mathematics Institute Fellow. In 2006, he was an Invited Speaker with talk Geometry over nonclosed fields at the International Congress of Mathematicians in Madrid. Tschinkel has German and American citizenships. He was elected a Fellow of the American Mathematical Society in 2012. In 2018 he was elected a member of the German Academy of Sciences Leopoldina.

== Selected publications ==
- as editor with Emmanuel Peyre: "Rational points on algebraic varieties", Birkhäuser 2001
- as editor with Bjorn Poonen: Arithmetic of higher dimensional algebraic varieties , Birkhäuser 2004
- as editor with Fedor Bogomolov: "Geometric methods in algebra and number theory", Birkhäuser 2005
- as editor with Fedor Bogomolov: "Cohomological and geometric approaches to rationality problems: new perspectives", Birkhäuser 2009
- as editor with William Duke: Analytic Number Theory – a tribute to Gauss and Dirichlet , American Mathematical Society 2007
- as editor with Yuri Zarhin: Algebra, Arithmetic and Geometry – In Honor of Yuri Manin , Birkhäuser 2010
- as editor with Wee-Teck Gan and Stephen Kudla: "Eisenstein Series and Applications", Birkhäuser 2008
