= Kathrin Bringmann =

German mathematician (born 1977)

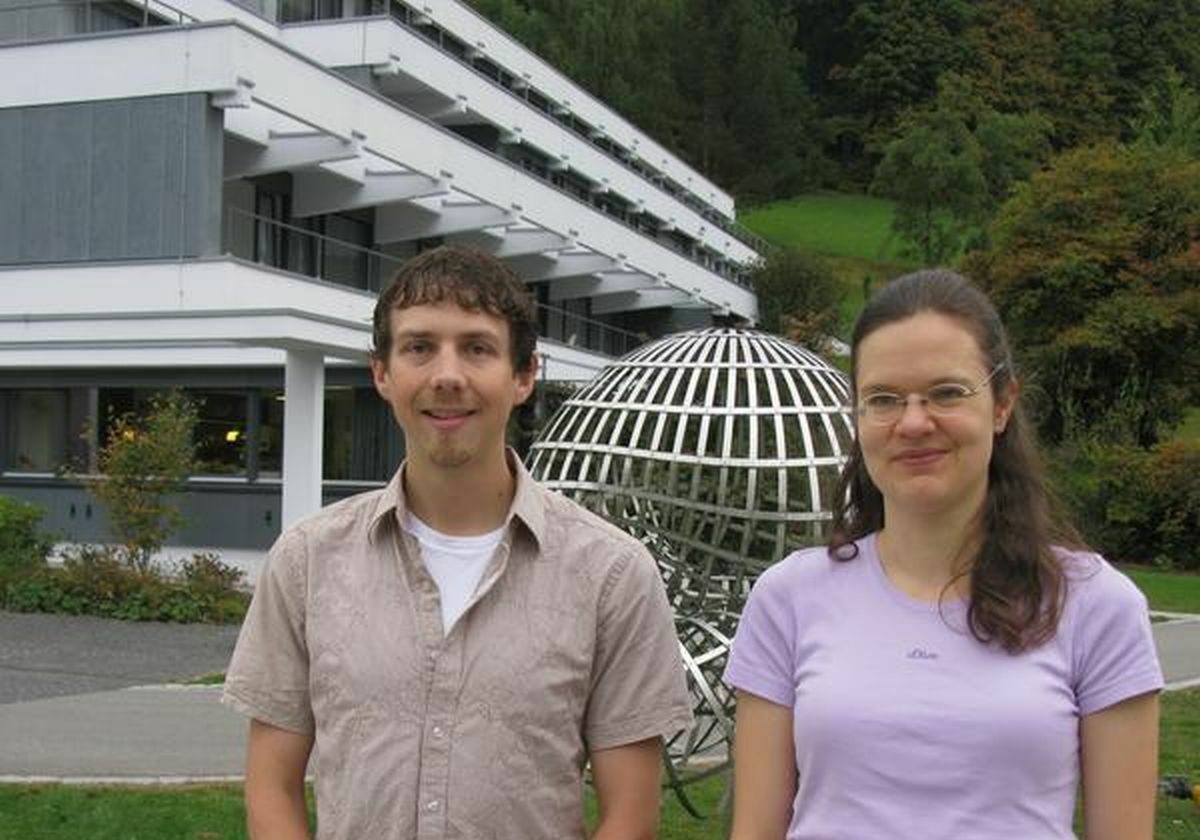
- Karl Mahlburg and Kathrin Bringmann at Oberwolfach (2009)
- Born: 8 May 1977 (age 49); Münster, Germany
- Education: University of Heidelberg
- Awards: SASTRA Ramanujan Prize (2009)
- Scientific career
- Fields: Mathematics
- Workplaces: University of Cologne
- Doctoral advisor: Winfried Kohnen

Kathrin Bringmann (born 8 May 1977) is a German number theorist in the University of Cologne, Germany, who has made fundamental contributions to the theory of mock theta functions.

== Education and career ==
Kathrin Bringmann was born on 8 May 1977, in Muenster, Germany. She passed the State Examinations in Mathematics and Theology at the University of Würzburg, Germany, in 2002, and obtained a Diploma in Mathematics at Würzburg in 2003. She received PhD in 2004 from University of Heidelberg under the supervision of Winfried Kohnen.

During 2004–07, she was Edward Burr Van Vleck Assistant Professor with the University of Wisconsin where she began her collaboration with Ken Ono. After briefly serving as an assistant professor at the University of Minnesota, she joined the University of Cologne, Germany, as Professor.

== Recognition ==
Bringmann has been awarded the Alfried Krupp-Förderpreis for Young Professors, a one-million-Euro prize instituted by the Alfried Krupp von Bohlen und Halbach Foundation. She is the third mathematician to win this prize. She has also been awarded the SASTRA Ramanujan Prize in 2009 for her contributions to "areas of mathematics influenced by the genius Srinivasa Ramanujan."

She was the Emmy Noether Lecturer of the German Mathematical Society in 2015.

A book by Bringmann with Amanda Folsom, Ken Ono, and Larry Rolen, Harmonic Maass Forms and Mock Modular Forms: Theory and Applications (Amer. Math. Soc., 2018), won the 2018 Prose Award for Best Scholarly Book in Mathematics from the Association of American Publishers.
