= Real analytic Eisenstein series =

Special function of two variables

In mathematics, a real analytic Eisenstein series is a special function of two variables that is used in the representation theory of SL(2, R) and, more broadly, in analytic number theory.

== Definition ==
Let $\mathcal{H}$ be the upper half-plane. For $z\in\mathcal{H}$, the Eisenstein series $E(z,s)$ is defined by

$$E(z,s) = \frac{1}{2}\sum_{(m,n)=1}\frac{y^s}{|mz+n|^{2s}}$$

for all $\Re(s)>1$. The sum is over all pairs of coprime integers.

Some authors omit the factor of $1/2$, and some sum over all pairs of integers that are not both zero; this changes the function by a factor of $\zeta(2s)$, where $\zeta$ is the Riemann zeta function.

== Properties ==
=== As a function of z ===
Viewed as a function of $z=x+iy$, $E(z,s)$ is a real-analytic eigenfunction of the Laplace operator on $\mathcal{H}$ with eigenvalue $s(s-1)$. In other words, it satisfies the elliptic partial differential equation

$$- y^2\left(\frac{\partial^2}{\partial x^2}+\frac{\partial^2}{\partial y^2}\right)E(z,s) = s(1-s)E(z,s).$$

The function $E(z,s)$ is invariant under the action of $\operatorname{SL}(2,\Z)$ on $z$ in the upper half plane by fractional linear transformations. Together with the previous property, this means that the Eisenstein series is a Maass form, a real-analytic analogue of a classical elliptic modular function.

Note that $E(z,s)$ is not a square-integrable function of $z$ with respect to the invariant Riemannian metric on $\mathcal{H}$.

=== As a function of s ===
The Eisenstein series converges for $\Re(s)>1$, but can be analytically continued to a meromorphic function of $s$ on the entire complex plane, with a unique pole of residue $3/\pi$ at $s=1$ in the half-plane $\Re(s)>1/2$ (for all $z\in\mathcal{H}$) and infinitely many poles in the strip $0<\Re(s)<1/2$ at $\rho/2$, where $\rho$ corresponds to a non-trivial zero of the Riemann zeta function. The constant term of the pole at $s=1$ is described by the Kronecker limit formula.

The modified function

$$E^*(z,s) = \pi^{-s}\Gamma(s)\zeta(2s)E(z,s)$$

satisfies the functional equation

$$E^*(z,s) = E^*(z,1-s),$$

analogous to the functional equation for the Riemann zeta function.

The scalar product of two different Eisenstein series $E(z,s)$ and $E(z,t)$ is given by the Maass-Selberg relations.

=== Fourier expansion ===
The above properties of the real analytic Eisenstein series, i.e. the functional equation for $E(z,s)$ and $E^*(z,s)$ using the Laplacian on $\mathcal{H}$, are shown from the fact that $E(z,s)$ has a Fourier expansion

$$E(z,s)=y^s+ \frac{\Lambda(2s-1)}{\Lambda(2s)}  y^{1-s} +\frac{4}{\Lambda(2s)}\sum_{n=1}^\infty n^{s-1/2}\sigma_{1-2s}(n)\sqrt{y}\,K_{s-1/2}(2\pi ny)\cos(2\pi nx),$$

where

$$\Lambda(s)=\pi^{-s/2}\Gamma\biggl(\frac{s}{2}\biggr)\zeta(s),\quad \sigma_s(m)=\sum_{d|m}d^s,$$

and $K_s(z)$ are the modified Bessel functions

$$K_s(z) =\frac{1}{2}\int^\infty_0 e^{-(z/2)(t+1/t)}t^{s-1}dt \sim \sqrt{\frac{\pi}{2z}}e^{-z}\quad (z\rightarrow\infty).$$

== Epstein zeta function ==
The Epstein zeta function $\zeta_Q(s)$ for a positive definite integral quadratic form $Q(m,n)=cm^2+bmn+an^2$, named after Paul Epstein, is defined by

$$\zeta_Q(s) = \sum_{(m,n)\ne (0,0)} {1\over Q(m,n)^s}.$$

It is essentially a special case of the real analytic Eisenstein series for a special value of $z$, since $Q(m,n) = a|mz-n|^2\$ for

$$z = -\frac{b}{2a} + \frac{i\sqrt{-b^2+4ac}}{2a}.$$

== Generalizations ==
The real analytic Eisenstein series $E(z,s)$ is really the Eisenstein series associated to the modular group, the discrete subgroup $\operatorname{SL}(2,\Z)$ of $\operatorname{SL}(2,\R)$. Selberg described generalizations to other discrete subgroups $\Gamma$ of $\operatorname{SL}(2,\R)$, and used these to study the representation of $\operatorname{SL}(2,\R)$ on $L^2(\operatorname{SL}(2,\R)/\Gamma)$. Langlands extended Selberg's work to higher dimensional groups; his notoriously difficult proofs were later simplified by Joseph Bernstein.

== See also ==
- Eisenstein series
- Kronecker limit formula
- Maass form
