= Paul Epstein =

German mathematician (1871–1939)

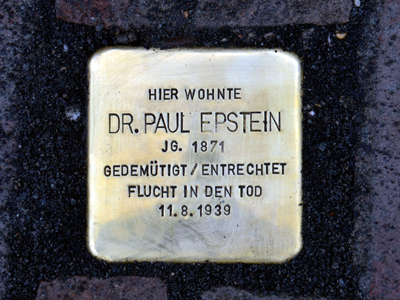
Stolperstein of Paul Epstein

Paul Epstein (July 24, 1871 – August 11, 1939) was a German mathematician. He was known for his contributions to number theory, in particular the Epstein zeta function.

Epstein was born and brought up in Frankfurt, where his father was a professor. He received his PhD in 1895 from the University of Strasbourg. From 1895 to 1918 he was a Privatdozent at the University in Strasbourg, which at that time was part of the German Empire. At the end of World War I the city of Strasbourg reverted to France, and Epstein, being German, had to return to Frankfurt.

Epstein was appointed to a non-tenured post at the university and he lectured in Frankfurt from 1919. Later he was appointed professor at Frankfurt. However, after the Nazis came to power in Germany he lost his university position. Because of his age (68) he was unable to find a new position abroad, and finally committed suicide by barbital overdose at Dornbusch, fearing Gestapo torture because he was a Jew.
