= Kronecker limit formula =

Mathematical theorem about the real analytic Eisenstein series

In mathematics, the classical Kronecker limit formula describes the constant term at s = 1 of a real analytic Eisenstein series (or Epstein zeta function) in terms of the Dedekind eta function. There are many generalizations of it to more complicated Eisenstein series. It is named for Leopold Kronecker.

== First Kronecker limit formula ==
The (first) Kronecker limit formula states that

$$E(\tau,s) = {\pi\over s-1} + 2\pi(\gamma-\log(2)-\log(\sqrt{y}|\eta(\tau)|^2)) +O(s-1),$$

where

- E(τ,s) is the real analytic Eisenstein series, given by

$$E(\tau,s) =\sum_{(m,n)\ne (0,0)}{y^s\over|m\tau+n|^{2s}}$$

for Re(s) > 1, and by analytic continuation for other values of the complex number s.

- γ is Euler–Mascheroni constant
- τ = x + iy with y > 0.
- $\eta(\tau) = q^{1/24}\prod_{n\ge 1}(1-q^n)$, with q = e^{2π i τ} is the Dedekind eta function.

So the Eisenstein series has a pole at s = 1 of residue π, and the (first) Kronecker limit formula gives the constant term of the Laurent series at this pole.

This formula has an interpretation in terms of the spectral geometry of the elliptic curve $E_\tau$ associated to the lattice $\mathbb{Z} + \mathbb{Z} \tau$: it says that the zeta-regularized determinant of the Laplace operator $\Delta$ associated to the flat metric $\frac{1}{y} |dz|^2$ on $E_\tau$ is given by $4y |\eta(\tau)|^4$. This formula has been used in string theory for the one-loop computation in Polyakov's perturbative approach.

== Second Kronecker limit formula ==
The second Kronecker limit formula states that

$$E_{u,v}(\tau,1) = -2\pi\log|f(u-v\tau;\tau)q^{v^2/2}|,$$

where

- u and v are real and not both integers.
- q = e^{2π i τ} and q^{a} = e^{2π i aτ}
- p = e^{2π i z} and p^{a} = e^{2π i az}
- $E_{u,v}(\tau,s) =\sum_{(m,n)\ne (0,0)}e^{2\pi i (mu+nv)}{y^s\over|m\tau+n|^{2s}}$

for Re(s) > 1, and is defined by analytic continuation for other values of the complex number s.

- $f(z,\tau) = q^{1/12}(p^{1/2}-p^{-1/2})\prod_{n\ge1}(1-q^np)(1-q^n/p).$

== See also ==
- Herglotz–Zagier function
