= Basil Gordon =

American mathematician

- Born: December 23, 1931
- Died: January 12, 2012 (aged 80)
- Education: California Institute of Technology
- Scientific career
- Fields: Mathematics
- Workplaces: UCLA
- Doctoral advisor: Tom M. Apostol
- Doctoral students: Robert Guralnick; Ken Ono

Basil Gordon (December 23, 1931 – January 12, 2012) was a mathematician at UCLA, specializing in number theory and combinatorics. He obtained his Ph.D. at California Institute of Technology under the supervision of Tom Apostol. Ken Ono was one of his students.

Gordon is well known for Göllnitz–Gordon identities, generalizing the Rogers–Ramanujan identities. He also posed the still-unsolved Gaussian moat problem in 1962.

Gordon was drafted into the US Army, where he worked with the former Nazi rocket scientist Wernher von Braun. Gordon's calculations of the gravitational interactions of earth, moon, and satellite contributed to the success and longevity of Explorer I, which launched in 1958 and remained in orbit until 1970. He was the step-grandson of General George Barnett and is a descendant of the Gordon family of British distillers, producers of Gordon's Gin.
