= Herglotz–Zagier function =

In mathematics, the Herglotz–Zagier function, named after Gustav Herglotz and Don Zagier, is the function

$$F(x)= \sum^{\infty}_{n=1} \left(\frac{\Gamma^{\prime}(nx)}{\Gamma (nx)} -\log (nx)\right) \frac{1}{n}.$$

It was introduced by Zagier who used it to obtain a Kronecker limit formula for real quadratic fields.
