= The Man Who Knew Infinity (book) =

Book by Robert Kanigel

- First hardcover edition (1991)
- Author: Robert Kanigel
- Language: English
- Subject: Biography, Mathematics
- Publisher: C. Scribner's
- Publication date: 1991
- Publication place: United States
- Media type: Print (Hardcover)
- Pages: 438
- ISBN: 978-0-684-19259-8
- Dewey Decimal: 510/.92 B 20
- LC Class: QA29.R3 K36 1991

The Man Who Knew Infinity: A Life of the Genius Ramanujan is a biography of the Indian mathematician Srinivasa Ramanujan, written in 1991 by Robert Kanigel. The book gives a detailed account of his upbringing in India, his mathematical achievements and his mathematical collaboration with mathematician G. H. Hardy. The book also reviews the life of Hardy and the academic culture of Cambridge University during the early twentieth century.

== Film adaptation ==
A feature film of the same title and based on the book was directed by Matt Brown using his own script. Srinivasa Ramanujan is played by Dev Patel, G. H. Hardy by Jeremy Irons, and Devika Bhise plays Janaki, Ramanujan’s wife. Filming began in August 2014 at Trinity College, Cambridge.

On September 17, 2015, the film premiered at the 2015 Toronto International Film Festival.
