= Witten zeta function =

Mathematical function

In mathematics, the Witten zeta function, is a function associated to a root system that encodes the degrees of the irreducible representations of the corresponding Lie group. These zeta functions were introduced by Don Zagier who named them after Edward Witten's study of their special values (among other things). Note that in, Witten zeta functions do not appear as explicit objects in their own right.

== Definition ==
If $G$ is a compact semisimple Lie group, the associated Witten zeta function is (the meromorphic continuation of) the series

$$\zeta_G(s)=\sum_\rho\frac{1}{(\dim\rho)^s},$$

where the sum is over equivalence classes of irreducible representations of $G$.

In the case where $G$ is connected and simply connected, the correspondence between representations of $G$ and of its Lie algebra, together with the Weyl dimension formula, implies that $\zeta_G(s)$ can be written as

$$\sum_{m_1,\dots,m_r>0}\prod_{\alpha\in \Phi^+}\frac{1}{\langle\alpha^\lor, m_1\lambda_1+\cdots+m_r\lambda_r\rangle^{s}},$$

where $\Phi^+$ denotes the set of positive roots, $\{\lambda_i\}$ is a set of simple roots and $r$ is the rank.

== Examples ==
- $\zeta_{SU(2)}(s)=\zeta(s)$, the Riemann zeta function.
- $\zeta_{SU(3)}(s)=\sum_{x=1}^{\infty}\sum_{y=1}^{\infty}\frac{1}{(xy(x+y)/2)^s}.$

== Abscissa of convergence ==
If $G$ is simple and simply connected, the abscissa of convergence of $\zeta_G(s)$ is $r/\kappa$, where $r$ is the rank and $\kappa=|\Phi^{+}|$. This is a theorem due to Alex Lubotzky and Michael Larsen. A new proof is given by Jokke Häsä and Alexander Stasinski which yields a more general result, namely it gives an explicit value (in terms of simple combinatorics) of the abscissa of convergence of any "Mellin zeta function" of the form

$\sum_{x_1,\dots,x_r=1}^{\infty}\frac{1}{P(x_1,\dots,x_r)^s},$

where $P(x_1,\dots,x_r)$ is a product of linear polynomials with non-negative real coefficients.

== Singularities and values of the Witten zeta function associated to SU(3) ==
$\zeta_{SU(3)}$ is absolutely convergent in $\{ s \in \mathbb{C}, \Re(s)>2/3 \}$, and it can be extended meromorphically in $\mathbb{C}$. Its singularities are in $\Bigl\{ \frac{2}{3} \Bigr\} \cup \Bigl\{ \frac{1}{2}-k, k \in \mathbb{N} \Bigr\},$ and all of those singularities are simple poles. In particular, the values of $\zeta_{SU(3)}(s)$ are well defined at all integers, and have been computed by Kazuhiro Onodera.

At $s=0$, we have $\zeta_{SU(3)}(0) = \frac{1}{3},$ and $\zeta_{SU(3)}'(0)=\log(2^{4/3}\pi).$

Let $a \in \mathbb{N}^*$ be a positive integer. We have

$\zeta_{SU(3)}(a)=\frac{2^{a+2}}{1+(-1)^a 2} \sum_{k=0}^{[a/2]} {2a-2k-1 \choose a-1} \zeta(2k) \zeta(3a-k).$

If a is odd, then $\zeta_{SU(3)}$ has a simple zero at $s=-a,$ and

$\zeta_{SU(3)}'(-a)=\frac{2^{-a+1} (a!)^2}{(2a+1)!} \zeta'(-3a-1) + 2^{-a+2} \sum_{k=0}^{(a-1)/2} {a \choose 2k} \zeta(-a-2k) \zeta'(-2a+2k).$

If a is even, then $\zeta_{SU(3)}$ has a zero of order $2$ at $s=-a,$ and

$\zeta_{SU(3)}''(-a)=2^{-a+2}\sum_{k=0}^{a/2} {a \choose 2k} \zeta'(-a-2k)\zeta'(-2a+2k).$
