= Maass wave form =

Complex-valued smooth functions of the upper half-plane (harmonic analysis topic)

In mathematics, Maass forms or Maass wave forms are studied in the theory of automorphic forms. Maass forms are complex-valued smooth functions of the upper half-plane, which transform in a similar way under the operation of a discrete subgroup $\Gamma$ of $\mathrm{SL}_{2}(\R)$ as modular forms. They are eigenforms of the hyperbolic Laplace operator $\Delta$ defined on the upper half plane and satisfy certain growth conditions at the cusps of a fundamental domain of $\Gamma$. In contrast to modular forms, Maass forms need not be holomorphic. They were studied first by Hans Maass in 1949.

== General remarks ==
The group

$$G := \operatorname{SL}_{2}(\R) = \left\{\begin{pmatrix} a & b \\ c & d \\ \end{pmatrix} \in M_2(\R) : ad - bc = 1 \right\}$$

operates on the upper half plane $\mathcal{H} = \{ z \in \C : \operatorname{Im}(z) > 0 \}$ by fractional linear transformations:

$$\begin{pmatrix} a & b \\ c & d \\ \end{pmatrix} \cdot z := \frac{az+b}{cz+d}.$$

It can be extended to an operation on $\mathcal{H} \cup \{\infty\} \cup \mathbb{\R}$ by defining

$$\begin{pmatrix} a & b \\ c & d \\ \end{pmatrix}\cdot z :=\begin{cases} \frac{az+b}{cz+d} & \text{if } cz+d \neq 0, \\ \infty & \text{if } cz+d=0,\end{cases}$$

and

$$\begin{pmatrix} a & b \\ c & d \\ \end{pmatrix} \cdot \infty
:= \lim_{\operatorname{Im}(z) \to \infty} \begin{pmatrix} a & b \\ c & d \\ \end{pmatrix}\cdot z
= \begin{cases}
a/c & \text{if } c \neq 0, \\
\infty & \text{if } c = 0.
\end{cases}$$

The Radon measure

$$d \mu(z) := \frac{dx dy}{y^2}$$

defined on $\mathcal{H}$ is invariant under the operation of $G$.

Let $\Gamma$ be a discrete subgroup of $G$. A fundamental domain for $\Gamma$ is an open set $F \subset \mathcal{H}$, so that there exists a system of representatives $R$ of $\Gamma \setminus \mathcal{H}$ with

$$F \subset R \subset \overline{F} \text{ and } \mu (\overline{F} \setminus F) = 0.$$

A fundamental domain for the modular group $\Gamma(1) := \mathrm{SL}_{2}(\Z )$ is given by

$$F := \left \{ z \in \mathcal{H} \mid \left|\operatorname{Re}(z)\right| < \frac{1}{2}, |z| > 1 \right \}$$

(see Modular form).

A function $f : \mathcal{H} \to \Complex$ is called $\Gamma$-invariant, if $f(\gamma z) = f(z)$ holds for all $\gamma \in \Gamma$ and all $z \in \mathcal{H}$.

For every measurable, $\Gamma$-invariant function $f: \mathcal{H} \to \Complex$ the equation

$$\int_F f(z) \, d\mu(z) = \int_{\Gamma \backslash \mathcal{H}} f(z) \, d\mu(z),$$

holds. Here the measure $d\mu$ on the right side of the equation is the induced measure on the quotient $\Gamma \backslash \mathcal{H}.$

== Classic Maass forms ==
=== Definition of the hyperbolic Laplace operator ===
The hyperbolic Laplace operator on $\mathcal{H}$ is defined as

$$\Delta : C^\infty (\mathcal{H}) \to C^\infty(\mathcal{H}),$$
$$\Delta = -y^2 \left( \frac{\partial^2}{\partial x^2} + \frac{\partial^2}{\partial y^2} \right)$$

=== Definition of a Maass form ===
A Maass form for the group $\Gamma (1) := \mathrm{SL}_{2}(\Z)$ is a complex-valued smooth function $f$ on $\mathcal{H}$ satisfying

1. $f(\gamma z)=f(z) \text{ for all } \gamma \in \Gamma (1), \qquad z \in \mathcal{H}$
2. $\text{there exists } \lambda \in \Complex \text{ with } \Delta (f) = \lambda f$
3. $\text{there exists } N \in \N \text{ with } f(x+iy) = \mathcal{O} (y^N) \text{ for } y \ge 1$

If

$$\int_0^1 f(z+t) dt = 0 \text{ for all } z \in \mathcal{H}$$

we call $f$ Maass cusp form.

=== Relation between Maass forms and Dirichlet series ===
Let $f$ be a Maass form. Since

$$\gamma := \begin{pmatrix} 1 & 1 \\ 0 & 1 \\ \end{pmatrix} \in \Gamma (1)$$

we have:

$$\forall z \in \mathcal{H}: \qquad f(z) = f(\gamma z) = f(z+1).$$

Therefore $f$ has a Fourier expansion of the form

$$f(x+iy) = \sum_{n=-\infty}^{\infty} a_{n}(y)e^{2\pi inx},$$

with coefficient functions $a_{n}, n \in \Z.$

It is easy to show that $f$ is Maass cusp form if and only if $a_{0}(y)=0 \;\; \forall y > 0$.

We can calculate the coefficient functions in a precise way. For this we need the Bessel function $K_v$.

Definition: The Bessel function $K_v$ is defined as

$$K_s(y) := \frac{1}{2} \int_0^\infty e^{-\frac{y(t+t^{-1})}{2}}t^s\frac{dt}{t},
\qquad s \in \Complex, y > 0.$$

The integral converges locally uniformly absolutely for $y > 0$ in $s \in \Complex$ and the inequality

$$K_s(y) \leq e^{-\frac{y}{2}}K_{\operatorname{Re}(s)}(2)$$

holds for all $y>4$.

Therefore, $|K_s|$ decreases exponentially for $y \to \infty$. Furthermore, we have $K_{-s}(y)=K_s(y)$ for all $s \in \Complex, y > 0$.

Theorem (Fourier coefficients of Maass forms)—Let $\lambda \in \Complex$ be the eigenvalue of the Maass form $f$ corresponding to $\Delta.$ There exist $\nu \in \Complex$, unique up to sign, such that $\lambda = \frac{1}{4} - \nu^2$. Then the Fourier coefficients of $f$ are
$$\begin{align}
a_n(y) &= c_n\sqrt{y} K_\nu(2\pi |n|y) \quad c_n \in \Complex && n \neq 0 \\
a_0(y) &= c_0 y^{\frac{1}{2}-\nu} + d_0 y^{\frac{1}{2}+\nu} \quad c_{0}, d_0 \in \Complex && n=0
\end{align}$$

Proof: We have

$$\Delta(f)=\left (\frac{1}{4} - \nu^{2} \right )f.$$

By the definition of the Fourier coefficients we get

$$a_n(y) = \int_0^1 f(x+iy)e^{-2\pi inx} dx$$

for $n \in \Z.$

Together it follows that

$$\begin{align}
\left(\frac{1}{4} - \nu^2\right) a_n(y) &= \int_0^1 \left(\frac{1}{4} - \nu^2\right) f(x+iy)e^{-2\pi inx} dx \\[4pt]
&= \int_0^1 (\Delta f)(x+iy)e^{-2\pi inx} dx \\[4pt]
&= -y^2 \left(\int_0^1 \frac{\partial^2 f}{\partial x^2}(x+iy)e^{-2\pi inx} dx + \int_0^1 \frac{\partial^2 f}{\partial y^2}(x+iy)e^{-2\pi inx} dx\right) \\[4pt]
&\overset{(1)}{=} -y^2 (2\pi i n)^2 a_n(y)- y^2\frac{\partial^2}{\partial y^2} \int_0^1 f(x+iy)e^{-2\pi inx} dx \\[4pt]
&= -y^2 (2\pi i n)^2 a_n(y)-y^2 \frac{\partial^2}{\partial y^2}a_n(y) \\[4pt]
&= 4 \pi^2 n^2 y^2 a_n(y)-y^2\frac{\partial^2}{\partial y^2}a_n(y)
\end{align}$$

for $n \in \Z.$

In (1) we used that the nth Fourier coefficient of $\frac{\partial^{2}f}{\partial x^{2}}$ is $(2\pi i n)^{2}a_{n}(y)$ for the first summation term. In the second term we changed the order of integration and differentiation, which is allowed since f is smooth in y . We get a linear differential equation of second degree:

$$y^2\frac{\partial^2}{\partial y^2} a_n(y) + \left( \frac{1}{4} - \nu^2-4\pi n^2 y^2 \right)a_n(y) = 0$$

For $n = 0$ one can show, that for every solution $f$ there exist unique coefficients $c_0, d_{0} \in \Complex$ with the property $a_0(y)=c_0 y^{\frac{1}{2} - \nu} + d_0 y^{\frac{1}{2} + \nu}.$

For $n\neq 0$ every solution $f$ has coefficients of the form

$$a_n(y) = c_n\sqrt{y}K_v(2\pi|n|y)+ d_n\sqrt{y}I_v(2\pi|n|y)$$

for unique $c_n,d_n \in \Complex$. Here $K_v(s)$ and $I_v(s)$ are Bessel functions.

The Bessel functions $I_v$ grow exponentially, while the Bessel functions $K_v$ decrease exponentially. Together with the polynomial growth condition 3) we get $f : a_{n}(y)=c_{n}\sqrt{y}K_{v}(2\pi|n|y)$ (also $d_{n} = 0$) for a unique $c_{n} \in \Complex$. Q.E.D.

Even and odd Maass forms: Let $i(z):=-\overline{z}$. Then i operates on all functions $f :\mathcal{H} \to \Complex$ by $i(f):=f(i(z))$ and commutes with the hyperbolic Laplacian. A Maass form $f$ is called even, if $i(f)=f$ and odd if $i(f)=-f$. If f is a Maass form, then $\tfrac{1}{2}(f+i(f))$ is an even Maass form and $\tfrac{1}{2}(f-i(f))$ an odd Maass form and it holds that $f=\tfrac{1}{2}(f+i(f))+\tfrac{1}{2}(f-i(f))$.

==== Theorem: The L-function of a Maass form ====
Let

$$f(x+iy)=\sum_{n \neq 0} c_{n}\sqrt{y}K_{\nu}(2\pi|n|y)e^{2\pi inx}$$

be a Maass cusp form. We define the L-function of $f$ as

$$L(s,f) = \sum_{n=1}^\infty c_n n^{-s}.$$

Then the series $L(s,f)$ converges for $\Re(s) > \frac{3}{2}$ and we can continue it to a whole function on $\Complex$.

If $f$ is even or odd we get

$$\Lambda(s,f) := \pi^{-s}\Gamma \left( \frac{s+\varepsilon+\nu}{2} \right) \Gamma \left( \frac{s+\varepsilon-\nu}{2} \right) L(s,f).$$

Here $\varepsilon = 0$ if $f$ is even and $\varepsilon = -1$ if $f$ is odd. Then $\Lambda$ satisfies the functional equation

$$\Lambda(s,f)=(-1)^\varepsilon \Lambda(1-s,f).$$

== Example: The non-holomorphic Eisenstein-series E ==
The non-holomorphic Eisenstein-series is defined for $z =x+iy \in \mathcal{H}$ and $s \in \Complex$ as

$$E(z,s) := \pi^{-s}\Gamma(s)\frac{1}{2} \sum_{(m,n) \neq (0,0)}\frac{y^s}{|mz+n|^{2s}}$$

where $\Gamma(s)$ is the Gamma function.

The series converges absolutely in $z \in \mathcal{H}$ for $\Re(s) > 1$ and locally uniformly in $\mathcal{H} \times \{\Re(s) > 1\}$, since one can show, that the series

$$S(z,s):=\sum_{(m,n) \neq (0,0)}\frac{1}{|mz+n|^s}$$

converges absolutely in $z\in \mathcal{H}$, if $\Re(s) > 2$. More precisely it converges uniformly on every set $K \times \{\Re(s) \geq \alpha\}$, for every compact set $K \subset \mathcal{H}$ and every $\alpha > 2$.

=== E is a Maass form ===
We only show $\mathrm{SL}_{2}(\Z)$-invariance and the differential equation. A proof of the smoothness can be found in Deitmar or Bump. The growth condition follows from the Fourier expansion of the Eisenstein series.

We will first show the $\mathrm{SL}_{2}(\Z)$-invariance. Let

$$\Gamma_{\infty}:=\pm \begin{pmatrix} 1 & \Z \\ 0 & 1 \\ \end{pmatrix}$$

be the stabilizer group $\infty$ corresponding to the operation of $\mathrm{SL}_{2}(\Z)$ on $\mathcal{H} \cup \{\infty\}$.

Proposition. E is $\Gamma(1)$-invariant.

Proof. Define:

$$\tilde{E}(z,s):= \sum_{\gamma \in \Gamma_{\infty} \backslash \Gamma} \Im(\gamma z)^s.$$

(a) $\tilde{E}$ converges absolutely in $z\in \mathcal{H}$ for $\Re(s)>1$ and $E(z,s) =\pi^{-s} \Gamma(s) \zeta(2s) \tilde{E}(z,s).$

Since

$$\gamma = \begin{pmatrix} a & b \\ c & d \\ \end{pmatrix} \in \Gamma (1) \Longrightarrow \Im(\gamma z) = \frac{\Im(z)}{|cz+d|^2},$$

we obtain

$$\tilde{E}(z,s)=\sum_{\gamma \in \Gamma_{\infty} \backslash \Gamma} \Im(\gamma z)^s=\sum_{(c,d)=1 \bmod \pm 1}\frac{y^s}{|cz+d|^{2s}}.$$

That proves the absolute convergence in $z \in \mathcal{H}$ for $\operatorname{Re}(s)>1.$

Furthermore, it follows that

$$\zeta(2s) \tilde{E}(z,s) = \sum_{n=1}^{\infty} n^{-s} \sum_{(c,d)=1 \bmod \pm 1}\frac{y^s}{|cz+d|^{2s}} = \sum_{n=1}^\infty \sum_{(c,d)=1 \bmod \pm 1}\frac{y^s}{|ncz+nd|^{2s}}=\sum_{(m,n) \neq (0,0)}\frac{y^s}{|mz+n|^{2s}},$$

since the map

$$\begin{cases}
\N \times \{(x,y) \in \Z ^{2} - \{(0,0)\} : (x,y)=1\} \to \Z ^{2} - \{(0,0)\} \\
(n,(x,y)) \mapsto (nx,ny)
\end{cases}$$

is a bijection (a) follows.

(b) We have $E(\gamma z,s)=E(z,s)$ for all $\gamma \in \Gamma(1)$.

For $\tilde{\gamma} \in \Gamma (1)$ we get

$$\tilde{E}(\tilde{\gamma} z,s)
= \sum_{\gamma \in \Gamma_{\infty} \backslash \Gamma} \Im(\tilde{\gamma}\gamma z)^s
= \sum_{\gamma \in \Gamma_{\infty} \backslash \Gamma} \Im(\gamma z)^s
= \tilde{E}(z,s).$$

Together with (a), $E$ is also invariant under $\Gamma (1)$. Q.E.D.

Proposition. E is an eigenform of the hyperbolic Laplace operator

We need the following Lemma:

Lemma: $\Delta$ commutes with the operation of $G$ on $C^{\infty}(\mathcal{H})$. More precisely for all $g \in G$ we have: $L_{g}\Delta = \Delta L_{g}.$

Proof: The group $\mathrm{SL}_{2}(\R)$ is generated by the elements of the form

$$\begin{pmatrix} a & 0 \\ 0 & \frac{1}{a} \\ \end{pmatrix}, a \in \R^{\times}; \quad \begin{pmatrix} 1 & x \\ 0 & 1 \\ \end{pmatrix}, x \in \R; \quad S=\begin{pmatrix} 0 & -1 \\ 1 & 0 \\ \end{pmatrix}.$$

One calculates the claim for these generators and obtains the claim for all $g\in \mathrm{SL}_{2}(\R)$. Q.E.D.

Since $E(z,s)=\pi^{-s} \Gamma (s) \zeta(2s) \tilde{E}(z,s)$ it is sufficient to show the differential equation for $\tilde{E}$. We have:

$$\Delta \tilde{E}(z,s)
:= \Delta\sum_{\gamma \in \Gamma_\infty \backslash \Gamma} \Im(\gamma z)^s
= \sum_{\gamma \in \Gamma_\infty \backslash \Gamma} \Delta \left (\Im(\gamma z)^s \right )$$

Furthermore, one has

$$\Delta \left (\Im(z)^s \right )=\Delta(y^s)
=-y^{2} \left (\frac{\partial^2 y^s}{\partial x^{2}} + \frac{\partial^{2}y^s}{\partial y^2} \right )
=s(1-s) y^s.$$

Since the Laplace Operator commutes with the Operation of $\Gamma(1)$, we get

$$\forall \gamma \in \Gamma(1): \quad \Delta \left (\Im(\gamma z)^s \right )=s(1-s) \Im(\gamma z)^s$$

and so

$$\Delta \tilde{E}(z,s) = s(1-s)\tilde{E}(z,s).$$

Therefore, the differential equation holds for E in $\Re(s) > 3$. In order to obtain the claim for all $s \in \Complex$, consider the function $\Delta E(z,s)-s(1-s)E(z,s)$. By explicitly calculating the Fourier expansion of this function, we get that it is meromorphic. Since it vanishes for $\Re(s) > 3$, it must be the zero function by the identity theorem.

==== The Fourier-expansion of E ====
The nonholomorphic Eisenstein series has a Fourier expansion

$$E(z,s)=\sum_{n=-\infty}^\infty a_n(y,s)e^{2\pi i nx}$$

where

$$\begin{align}
a_0(y,s) &= \pi^{-s} \Gamma(s) \zeta (2s) y^s + \pi^{s-1}\Gamma(1-s)\zeta (2(1-s))y^{1-s} \\
a_n(y,s) &= 2|n|^{s-\frac{1}{2}}\sigma_{1-2s}(|n|)\sqrt{y}K_{s-\frac{1}{2}}(2\pi|n|y) && n \neq 0
\end{align}$$

If $z \in \mathcal{H}$, $E(z,s)$ has a meromorphic continuation on $\Complex$. It is holomorphic except for simple poles at $s= 0, 1.$

The Eisenstein series satisfies the functional equation

$$E(z,s)=E(z,1-s)$$

for all $z\in \mathcal{H}$.

Locally uniformly in $x\in \R$ the growth condition

$$E(x+iy,s) = \mathcal{0}(y^\sigma)$$

holds, where $\sigma = \max(\operatorname{Re}(s),1-\operatorname{Re}(s)).$

The meromorphic continuation of E is very important in the spectral theory of the hyperbolic Laplace operator.

== Maass forms of weight k ==
=== Congruence subgroups ===
For $N \in \N$ let $\Gamma (N)$ be the kernel of the canonical projection

$$\mathrm{SL}_{2}(\Z ) \to \mathrm{SL}_{2}(\Z/N \Z).$$

We call $\Gamma (N)$ principal congruence subgroup of level $N$. A subgroup $\Gamma \subseteq \mathrm{SL}_{2}(\Z)$ is called a congruence subgroup, if there exists $N\in \N$, so that $\Gamma (N) \subseteq \Gamma$. All congruence subgroups are discrete.

Let

$$\overline{\Gamma(1)}:= \Gamma(1) /\{\pm 1\}.$$

For a congruence subgroup $\Gamma,$ let $\overline{\Gamma}$ be the image of $\Gamma$ in $\overline{\Gamma(1)}$. If S is a system of representatives of $\overline{\Gamma} \backslash \overline{\Gamma(1)}$, then

$$SD = \bigcup_{\gamma \in S} \gamma D$$

is a fundamental domain for $\Gamma$. The set $S$ is uniquely determined by the fundamental domain $SD$. Furthermore, $S$ is finite.

The points $\gamma \infty$ for $\gamma \in S$ are called cusps of the fundamental domain $SD$. They are a subset of $\Q \cup \{\infty\}$.

For every cusp $c$ there exists $\sigma \in \Gamma(1)$ with $\sigma \infty = c$.

=== Maass forms of weight k ===
Let $\Gamma$ be a congruence subgroup and $k \in \Z.$

We define the hyperbolic Laplace operator $\Delta_{k}$ of weight $k$ as

$$\Delta_{k} : C^{\infty }(\mathcal{H}) \to C^{\infty}(\mathcal{H}),$$
$$\Delta_{k} = -y^{2} \left (\frac{\partial^{2}}{\partial x^{2}} + \frac{\partial^{2}}{\partial y^{2}} \right ) + iky\frac{\partial}{\partial x}.$$

This is a generalization of the hyperbolic Laplace operator $\Delta_{0}=\Delta$.

We define an operation of $\mathrm{SL}_{2}(\R)$ on $C^{\infty}(\mathcal{H})$ by

$$f_{||k}g(z) := \left(\frac{cz+d}{|cz+d|}\right)^{-k}f(gz)$$

where

$$z \in \mathcal{H}, g = \begin{pmatrix} \ast & \ast \\ c & d \\ \end{pmatrix} \in \mathrm{SL}_{2}(\R), f \in C^{\infty}(\mathcal{H}).$$

It can be shown that

$$(\Delta_{k}f)_{||k}g = \Delta_{k}(f_{||k}g)$$

holds for all $f \in C^{\infty}(\mathcal{H}), k \in \Z$ and every $g \in \mathrm{SL}_{2}(\R)$.

Therefore, $\Delta_{k}$ operates on the vector space

$$C^{\infty}(\Gamma \backslash \mathcal{H},k) := \{ f \in C^{\infty}(\mathcal{H}) : f_{||k}\gamma = f \forall \gamma \in \Gamma\}$$.

Definition. A Maass form of weight $k\in \Z$ for $\Gamma$ is a function $f \in C^{\infty}(\Gamma \backslash \mathcal{H}, k)$ that is an eigenfunction of $\Delta_{k}$ and is of moderate growth at the cusps.

The term moderate growth at cusps needs clarification. Infinity is a cusp for $\Gamma,$ a function $f \in C^{\infty}(\Gamma \backslash \mathcal{H}, k)$ is of moderate growth at $\infty$ if $f(x+iy)$ is bounded by a polynomial in y as $y \to \infty$. Let $c \in \Q$ be another cusp. Then there exists $\theta \in \mathrm{SL}_{2}(\Z)$ with $\theta (\infty)=c$. Let $f':=f_{||k}\theta$. Then $f' \in C^{\infty}(\Gamma' \backslash \mathcal{H}, k)$, where $\Gamma'$ is the congruence subgroup $\theta^{-1}\Gamma\theta$. We say $f$ is of moderate growth at the cusp $c$, if $f'$ is of moderate growth at $\infty$.

Definition. If $\Gamma$ contains a principal congruence subgroup of level $N$, we say that $f$ is cuspidal at infinity, if

$$\forall z \in \mathcal{H}: \quad \int_{0}^{N} f(z+u) du = 0.$$

We say that $f$ is cuspidal at the cusp $c$ if $f'$ is cuspidal at infinity. If $f$ is cuspidal at every cusp, we call $f$ a cusp form.

We give a simple example of a Maass form of weight $k > 1$ for the modular group:

Example. Let $g : \mathcal{H} \to \Complex$ be a modular form of even weight $k$ for $\Gamma (1).$ Then $f(z):= y^{\frac{k}{2}}g(z)$ is a Maass form of weight $k$ for the group $\Gamma (1)$.

=== The spectral problem ===
Let $\Gamma$ be a congruence subgroup of $\mathrm{SL}_{2}(\R)$ and let $L^{2}(\Gamma \backslash \mathcal{H},k)$ be the vector space of all measurable functions $f :\mathcal{H} \to \Complex$ with $f_{||k}\gamma = f$ for all $\gamma \in \Gamma$ satisfying

$$\|f\|^2 := \int_{\Gamma \backslash \mathcal{H}} |f(z)|^2 d\mu(z) < \infty$$

modulo functions with $\|f\| = 0.$ The integral is well defined, since the function $|f(z)|^2$ is $\Gamma$-invariant. This is a Hilbert space with inner product

$$\langle f,g\rangle = \int_{\Gamma \backslash \mathcal{H}} f(z)\overline{g(z)} d\mu(z).$$

The operator $\Delta_k$ can be defined in a vector space $B \subset L^2(\Gamma \backslash \mathcal{H},k) \cap C^{\infty}(\Gamma \backslash \mathcal{H},k)$ which is dense in $L^2(\Gamma \backslash \mathcal{H},k)$. There $\Delta_k$ is a positive semidefinite symmetric operator. It can be shown, that there exists a unique self-adjoint continuation on $L^2(\Gamma \backslash \mathcal{H},k).$

Define $C(\Gamma \backslash \mathcal{H},k)$ as the space of all cusp forms $L^{2}(\Gamma \backslash \mathcal{H} ,k) \cap C^{\infty}(\Gamma \backslash \mathcal{H} ,k).$ Then $\Delta_{k}$ operates on $C(\Gamma \backslash \mathcal{H},k)$ and has a discrete spectrum. The spectrum belonging to the orthogonal complement has a continuous part and can be described with the help of (modified) non-holomorphic Eisenstein series, their meromorphic continuations and their residues. (See Bump or Iwaniec).

If $\Gamma$ is a discrete (torsion free) subgroup of $\mathrm{SL}_{2}(\R)$, so that the quotient $\Gamma \backslash \mathcal{H}$ is compact, the spectral problem simplifies. This is because a discrete cocompact subgroup has no cusps. Here all of the space $L^{2}(\Gamma \backslash \mathcal{H} ,k)$ is a sum of eigenspaces.

=== Embedding into the space L^{2}(Γ \ G) ===
$G = \mathrm{SL}_{2}(\R)$ is a locally compact unimodular group with the topology of $\R^4.$ Let $\Gamma$ be a congruence subgroup. Since $\Gamma$ is discrete in $G$, it is closed in $G$ as well. The group $G$ is unimodular and since the counting measure is a Haar-measure on the discrete group $\Gamma$, $\Gamma$ is also unimodular. By the Quotient Integral Formula there exists a $G$-right-invariant Radon measure $dx$ on the locally compact space $\Gamma \backslash G$. Let $L^{2}(\Gamma \backslash G)$ be the corresponding $L^2$-space. This space decomposes into a Hilbert space direct sum:

$$L^2(\Gamma \backslash G) = \bigoplus_{k \in \Z }L^2(\Gamma \backslash G,k)$$

where

$$L^2(\Gamma \backslash G, k):= \left \{\phi \in L^{2}(\Gamma \backslash G)\mid \phi (xk_\theta) = e^{ik \theta} F(x) \forall x \in \Gamma \backslash G \forall \theta \in \R \right \}$$

and

$$k_\theta = \begin{pmatrix} \cos(\theta) & -\sin(\theta) \\ \sin(\theta) & \cos(\theta) \\ \end{pmatrix} \in SO(2), \theta \in \R.$$

The Hilbert-space $L^2(\Gamma \backslash \mathcal{H}, k)$ can be embedded isometrically into the Hilbert space $L^2(\Gamma \backslash G , k)$. The isometry is given by the map

$$\begin{cases} \psi_k : L^2(\Gamma \backslash \mathcal{H}, k) \to L^2(\Gamma \backslash G, k) \\ \psi_{k}(f)(g) := f_{||k}\gamma(i) \end{cases}$$

Therefore, all Maass cusp forms for the congruence group $\Gamma$ can be thought of as elements of $L^2(\Gamma \backslash G)$.

$L^2(\Gamma \backslash G)$ is a Hilbert space carrying an operation of the group $G$, the so-called right regular representation:

$$R_g\phi := \phi(xg), \text{ where } x \in \Gamma \backslash G \text{ and } \phi \in L^2(\Gamma \backslash G).$$

One can easily show, that $R$ is a unitary representation of $G$ on the Hilbert space $L^{2}(\Gamma \backslash G)$. One is interested in a decomposition into irreducible subrepresentations. This is only possible if $\Gamma$ is cocompact. If not, there is also a continuous Hilbert-integral part. The interesting part is, that the solution of this problem also solves the spectral problem of Maass forms. (see Bump, C. 2.3)

== Maass cusp form ==
A Maass cusp form, a subset of Maass forms, is a function on the upper half-plane that transforms like a modular form but need not be holomorphic. They were first studied by Hans Maass in Maass (1949).

=== Definition ===
Let k be an integer, s be a complex number, and Γ be a discrete subgroup of SL_{2}(R). A Maass form of weight k for Γ with Laplace eigenvalue s is a smooth function from the upper half-plane to the complex numbers satisfying the following conditions:

- For all $\gamma = \left(\begin{smallmatrix} a & b \\ c & d\end{smallmatrix}\right) \in \Gamma$ and all $z \in \mathcal{H}$, we have $f\left(\frac{az+b}{cz+d}\right) = \left(\frac{cz+d}{|cz+d|}\right)^k f(z).$
- We have $\Delta_k f = sf$, where $\Delta_k$ is the weight k hyperbolic Laplacian defined as
  $$\Delta_k = -y^2 \left(\frac{\partial^2}{\partial x^2} + \frac{\partial^2}{\partial y^2}\right) + i k y \frac \partial {\partial x}.$$
- The function $f$ is of at most polynomial growth at cusps.

A weak Maass form is defined similarly but with the third condition replaced by "The function $f$ has at most linear exponential growth at cusps". Moreover, $f$ is said to be harmonic if it is annihilated by the Laplacian operator.

=== Major results ===
Let $f$ be a weight 0 Maass cusp form. Its normalized Fourier coefficient at a prime p is bounded by p^{7/64} + p^{−7/64}. This theorem is due to Henry Kim and Peter Sarnak. It is an approximation toward Ramanujan-Petersson conjecture.

=== Higher dimensions ===
Maass cusp forms can be regarded as automorphic forms on GL(2). It is natural to define Maass cusp forms on GL(n) as spherical automorphic forms on GL(n) over the rational number field. Their existence is proved by Miller, Mueller, etc.

== Automorphic representations of the adele group ==
=== The group GL_{2}(A) ===
Let $R$ be a commutative ring with unit and let $G_R:=\mathrm{GL}_2(R)$ be the group of $2 \times 2$ matrices with entries in $R$ and invertible determinant. Let $\mathbb{A}=\mathbb{A}_\Q$ be the ring of rational adeles, $\mathbb{A}_\text{fin}$ the ring of the finite (rational) adeles and for a prime number $p \in \N$ let $\Q_p$ be the field of p-adic numbers. Furthermore, let $\Z_p$ be the ring of the p-adic integers (see Adele ring). Define $G_p:=G_{\Q_p}$. Both $G_p$ and $G_{\R}$ are locally compact unimodular groups if one equips them with the subspace topologies of $\Q_p^4$ respectively $\R^4$. Then:

$$G_\text{fin}:=G_{\mathbb{A}_\text{fin}} \cong \widehat{\prod_{p<\infty}^{K_p}} G_p.$$

The right side is the restricted product, concerning the compact, open subgroups $K_p:=G_{\Z_p}$ of $G_p$. Then $G_\text{fin}$ locally compact group, if we equip it with the restricted product topology.

The group $G_{\mathbb{A}}$ is isomorphic to

$$G_\text{fin} \times G_{\R}$$

and is a locally compact group with the product topology, since $G_\text{fin}$ and $G_{\R}$ are both locally compact.

Let

$$\widehat{\Z} = \prod_{p<\infty}\Z_{p}.$$

The subgroup

$$G_{\widehat{\Z}}:=\prod_{p<\infty}K_p$$

is a maximal compact, open subgroup of $G_\text{fin}$ and can be thought of as a subgroup of $G_{\mathbb{A}}$, when we consider the embedding $x_\text{fin} \mapsto (x_\text{fin},1_\infty)$.

We define $Z_{\R}$ as the center of $G_\infty$, that means $Z_{\R}$ is the group of all diagonal matrices of the form
$$\begin{pmatrix} \lambda & \\ & \lambda \\ \end{pmatrix}$$
, where $\lambda \in \R^\times$. We think of $Z_{\R}$ as a subgroup of $G_{\mathbb{A}}$ since we can embed the group by $z \mapsto (1_{G_\text{fin}},z)$.

The group $G_\Q$ is embedded diagonally in $G_{\mathbb{A}}$, which is possible, since all four entries of a $x \in G_\Q$ can only have finite amount of prime divisors and therefore $x \in K_p$ for all but finitely many prime numbers $p \in \N$.

Let $G^1_{\mathbb{A}}$ be the group of all $x \in G_{\mathbb{A}}$ with $|\det(x)|=1$. (see Adele Ring for a definition of the absolute value of an Idele). One can easily calculate, that $G_\Q$ is a subgroup of $G^1_{\mathbb{A}}$.

With the one-to-one map $G^1_{\mathbb{A}} \hookrightarrow G_{\mathbb{A}}$ we can identify the groups $G_\Q \backslash G^1_{\mathbb{A}}$ and $G_\Q Z_{\R} \backslash G_{\mathbb{A}}$ with each other.

The group $G_\Q$ is dense in $G_\text{fin}$ and discrete in $G_{\mathbb{A}}$. The quotient $G_\Q Z_{\R} \backslash G_{\mathbb{A}} = G_\Q \backslash G^1_{\mathbb{A}}$ is not compact but has finite Haar-measure.

Therefore, $G_\Q$ is a lattice of $G^1_{\mathbb{A}},$ similar to the classical case of the modular group and $\mathrm{SL}_2(\R)$. By harmonic analysis one also gets that $G^1_{\mathbb{A}}$ is unimodular.

=== Adelisation of cuspforms ===
We now want to embed the classical Maass cusp forms of weight 0 for the modular group into $Z_{\R} G_\Q \backslash G_{\mathbb{A}}$. This can be achieved with the "strong approximation theorem", which states that the map

$$\psi : G_{\Z}x_\infty \mapsto G_\Q(1,x_{\infty}) G_{\widehat{\Z}}$$

is a $G_{\R}$-equivariant homeomorphism. So we get

$$G_{\Z} \backslash G_{\R} \overset\sim\to G_\Q \backslash G_{\mathbb{A}} / G_{\widehat{\Z}}$$

and furthermore

$$G_{\Z} Z_{\R} \backslash G_{\R} \overset\sim\to G_\Q Z_{\R}\backslash G_{\mathbb{A}} / G_{\widehat{\Z}}.$$

Maass cuspforms of weight 0 for modular group can be embedded into

$$L^2(\mathrm{SL}_2(\Z) \backslash \mathrm{SL}_2(\R)) \cong L^2(\mathrm{GL}_2 (\Z) Z_{\R} \backslash \mathrm{GL}_2(\R)).$$

By the strong approximation theorem this space is unitary isomorphic to

$$L^2(G_{\Q} Z_{\R}\backslash G_{\mathbb{A}} / G_{\widehat{\Z}}) \cong L^2(G_{\Q} Z_{\R}\backslash G_{\mathbb{A}})^{G_{\widehat{\Z}}}$$

which is a subspace of $L^2(G_\Q Z_{\R}\backslash G_{\mathbb{A}}).$

In the same way one can embed the classical holomorphic cusp forms. With a small generalization of the approximation theorem, one can embed all Maass cusp forms (as well as the holomorphic cuspforms) of any weight for any congruence subgroup $\Gamma$ in $L^2(G_{\Q} Z_{\R}\backslash G_{\mathbb{A}})$.

We call $L^2(G_{\Q} Z_{\R}\backslash G_{\mathbb{A}})$ the space of automorphic forms of the adele group.

=== Cusp forms of the adele group ===
Let $R$ be a Ring and let $N_R$ be the group of all
$$\begin{pmatrix} 1 & r \\ & 1 \\ \end{pmatrix},$$
where $r \in R$. This group is isomorphic to the additive group of R.

We call a function $f \in L^{2}(G_{\Q}\backslash G^{1}_{\mathbb{A}})$ cusp form, if

$$\int_{N_{\Q} \backslash N_{\mathbb{A}}} f(nx) dn = 0$$

holds for almost all$x \in G_{\Q}\backslash G^{1}_{\mathbb{A}}$. Let $L^2_\text{cusp}(G_\Q\backslash G^1_{\mathbb{A}})$ (or just $L^{2}_\text{cusp}$) be the vector space of these cusp forms. $L^2_\text{cusp}$ is a closed subspace of $L^2(G_{\Q} Z_{\R} \backslash G_{\mathbb{A}})$ and it is invariant under the right regular representation of $G^1_{\mathbb{A}}.$

One is again interested in a decomposition of $L^2_\text{cusp}$ into irreducible closed subspaces.

We have the following theorem:

The space $L^2_\text{cusp}$ decomposes in a direct sum of irreducible Hilbert-spaces with finite multiplicities $N_\text{cusp}(\pi) \in \N _0$:

$$L^2_\text{cusp} = \widehat{\bigoplus_{\pi \in \widehat{G}_{\mathbb{A}}}} N_\text{cusp}(\pi)\pi$$

The calculation of these multiplicities $N_\text{cusp}(\pi)$ is one of the most important and most difficult problems in the theory of automorphic forms.

=== Cuspidal representations of the adele group ===
An irreducible representation $\pi$ of the group $G_{\mathbb{A}}$ is called cuspidal, if it is isomorphic to a subrepresentation of $L^2_\text{cusp}$.

An irreducible representation $\pi$ of the group $G_{\mathbb{A}}$ is called admissible if there exists a compact subgroup $K$ of $K \subset G_{\mathbb{A}}$, so that $\dim_K (V_\pi,V_\tau) < \infty$ for all $\tau \in \widehat{G}_{\mathbb{A}}$.

One can show, that every cuspidal representation is admissible.

The admissibility is needed to proof the so-called Tensorprodukt-Theorem anzuwenden, which says, that every irreducible, unitary and admissible representation of the group $G_{\mathbb{A}}$ is isomorphic to an infinite tensor product

$$\bigotimes_{p\leq \infty} \pi_p.$$

The $\pi_p$ are irreducible representations of the group $G_p$. Almost all of them need to be umramified.

(A representation $\pi_p$ of the group $G_p$ $(p < \infty)$ is called unramified, if the vector space

$$V_{\pi_p}^{K_p} = \left\{ v \in V_{\pi_p}\mid \pi_p(k)v = v \forall k \in K_p \right \}$$

is not the zero space.)

A construction of an infinite tensor product can be found in Deitmar,C.7.

=== Automorphic L-functions ===
Let $\pi$ be an irreducible, admissible unitary representation of $G_{\mathbb{A}}$. By the tensor product theorem, $\pi$ is of the form $\pi = \bigotimes_{p\leq \infty} \pi_{p}$ (see cuspidal representations of the adele group)

Let $S$ be a finite set of places containing $\infty$ and all ramified places . One defines the global Hecke - function of $\pi$ as

$$L^S(s,\pi) :=\prod_{p \notin S} L(s,\pi_{p})$$

where $L(s,\pi_p)$ is a so-called local L-function of the local representation $\pi_p$. A construction of local L-functions can be found in Deitmar C. 8.2.

If $\pi$ is a cuspidal representation, the L-function $L^S(s,\pi)$ has a meromorphic continuation on $\Complex$. This is possible, since $L^S(s,\pi)$, satisfies certain functional equations.

== See also ==
- Harmonic Maass form
- Mock modular form
- Real analytic Eisenstein series
- Voronoi formula
