= William Duke (mathematician) =

American mathematician

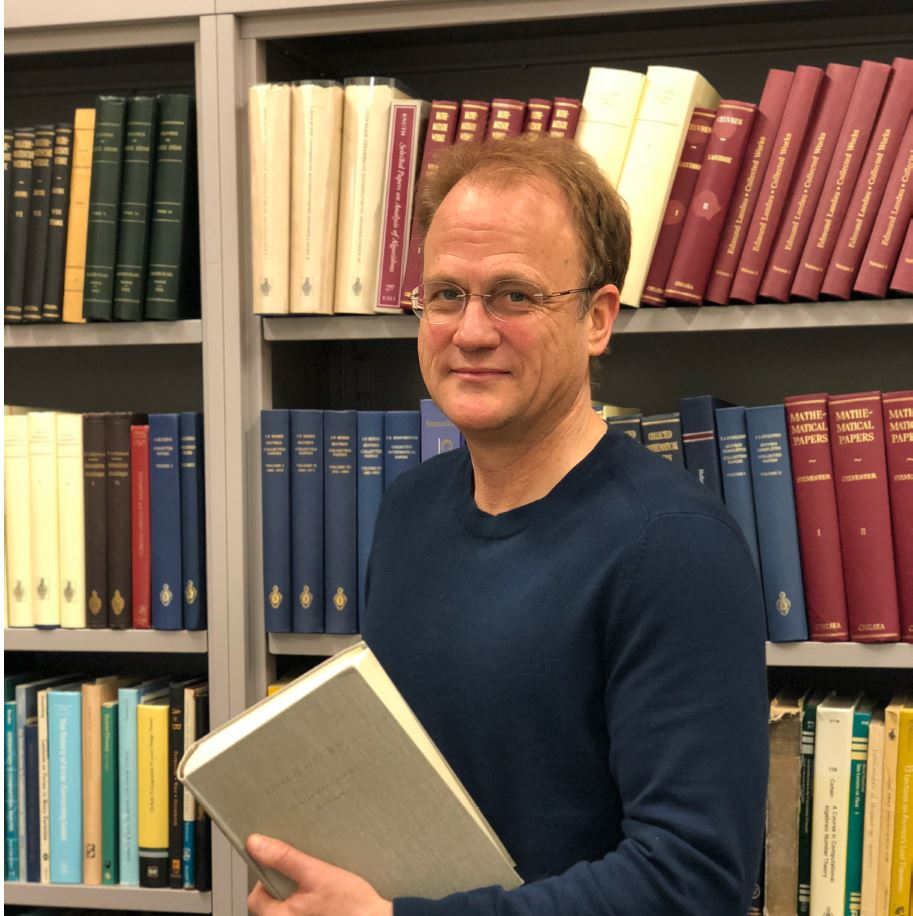
William Duke. UCLA, 2019

William Drexel Duke (born 1958) is an American mathematician specializing in number theory. Duke studied at the University of New Mexico and then at New York University (Courant Institute), from which he received his Ph.D. in 1986 under the direction of Peter Sarnak. After a postdoctoral stint at the University of California, San Diego he joined the faculty of Rutgers University, where he stayed until becoming a Professor of Mathematics at the University of California, Los Angeles (UCLA). He was Chair of the mathematics department at UCLA from 2015 to 2018.

== Honors ==
Duke gave an Invited Address at the 1998 International Congress of Mathematicians in Berlin. Duke gave an AMS Invited Address at a 2001 Fall sectional meeting of the American Mathematical Society in Irvine, California. He was selected as a fellow of the American Mathematical Society in 2016 "for contributions to analytic number theory and the theory of automorphic forms".

Duke is an Editorial Board Member for the book series "Monographs in Number Theory" published by World Scientific.

== Students ==
- Amanda Folsom
- Árpád Tóth
- Jack Buttcane

== Selected publications ==
- Duke, W. (1988) Hyperbolic distribution problems and half-integral weight Maass forms, Inventiones Mathematicae, 92, 73–90.
- Duke, W., Schulze-Pillot, R. (1993) Representation of integers by positive ternary quadratic forms and equidistribution of lattice points on ellipsoids, Duke Mathematical Journal, 71, 143–179.
- Duke, W., Friedlander, J., Iwaniec, H. (1993) Bounds for automorphic L-functions, Inventiones Mathematicae, 112, 1–8.
- Duke, W., Friedlander, J., Iwaniec, H. (1994) Bounds for automorphic L-functions II, Inventiones Mathematicae, 115, 219–239.
- Duke, W., Friedlander, J., Iwaniec, H. (1995), Equidistribution of roots of a quadratic congruence to prime moduli, Annals of Mathematics, 141, 423–441.
- Duke, W. (1995) The critical order of vanishing of automorphic L-functions with large level, Inventiones Mathematicae, 119, 165–174.
- Duke, W., Kowalski, E. (2000), A problem of Linnik for elliptic curves and mean-value estimates for automorphic representations. With an appendix by Dinakar Ramakrishnan, Inventiones Mathematicae, 139, 1–39.
- Duke, W., Friedlander, J., Iwaniec, H. (2002), The subconvexity problem for Artin L-functions, Inventiones Mathematicae, 149, 489–577.
- W. Duke, Continued fractions and modular functions, Bull. Amer. Math. Soc. (N.S.) 42 (2005), 137--162
- W. Duke, ¨O. Imamoglu,´A . Toth, Cycle integrals of the j-function and mock modular forms, Ann. of Math. (2) 173 (2011), no. 2, 947-981.
- W. Duke, ¨O. Imamoglu,´A . Toth,Geometric invariants for real quadratic fields, Annals of Math. 184 (2016), no. 3, 949-990.
- W. Duke, On elliptic curves and binary quartic forms, IMRN (2022), no. 23, 19078–19104.
