= Jan Hendrik Bruinier =

German mathematician

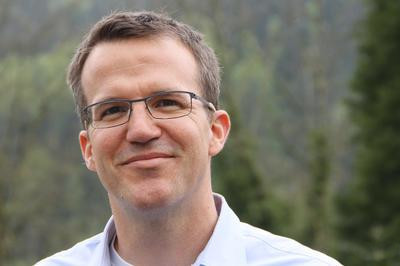
- Bruinier at Oberwolfach, 2014
- Born: October 21, 1971 (age 54)
- Known for: Contributions to number theory, automorphic forms, and arithmetic geometry
- Scientific career
- Fields: Mathematics

Jan Hendrik Bruinier (born 21 October 1971) is a German mathematician, whose work focuses on number theory.

== Work ==
In 2011, together with Ken Ono, he developed a finite algebraic formula for the values of the partition function.

== Recognition ==
He was named to the 2023 class of Fellows of the American Mathematical Society, "for contributions to number theory, automorphic forms, and arithmetic geometry".
