= Ken Ono =

American mathematician

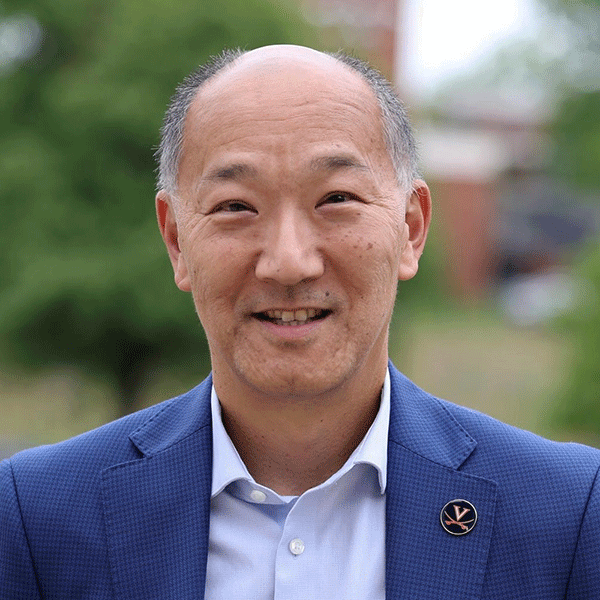
- Headshot of Ken Ono
- Born: March 20, 1968 (age 58); Philadelphia, Pennsylvania, US
- Education: University of Chicago (BA, MA); University of California, Los Angeles (PhD)
- Scientific career
- Fields: Mathematics
- Workplaces: University of Virginia; Emory University; University of Wisconsin–Madison; Pennsylvania State University
- Doctoral advisor: Basil Gordon
- Doctoral students: Robert Schneider
- Other notable students: Daniel Kane; Kate Douglass
- Website: uva.theopenscholar.com/ken-ono

Ken Ono (born March 20, 1968) is an American mathematician who studies number theory. Formerly the STEM Advisor to the Provost and the Marvin Rosenblum Professor of Mathematics at the University of Virginia, he now works in artificial intelligence at Axiom Math in Palo Alto, California.

== Early life and education ==
Ono was born on March 20, 1968, in Philadelphia, Pennsylvania. He is the son of mathematician Takashi Ono, who emigrated from Japan to the United States after World War II. Ono was born in the United States as his father returned to the United States from the University of British Columbia in Canada for a position at the University of Pennsylvania.

In the 1980s, Ono attended Towson High School, but dropped out. He later enrolled at the University of Chicago without a high school diploma. There he raced bicycles, and he was a member of the Pepsi–Miyata Cycling Team.

He received his BA from the University of Chicago in 1989, where he was a member of the Psi Upsilon fraternity. He earned his PhD in 1993 from the University of California, Los Angeles, where his advisor was Basil Gordon. Initially, he planned to study medicine, but later switched to mathematics. He attributes his interest in mathematics to his father.

He is the brother of Santa Ono, a professor of immunology and former academic administrator.

== Career ==
Ono worked as an instructor at Woodbury University from 1991 to 1993, as a visiting assistant professor at the University of Georgia from 1993 to 1994, and as a visiting assistant professor at the University of Illinois Urbana-Champaign from 1994 to 1995. He was a member of the Institute for Advanced Study from 1995 to 1997.

Ono worked at Pennsylvania State University from 1997 to 2000 as an assistant professor and then as the Louis A. Martarano Professor of Mathematics. He moved to the University of Wisconsin-Madison as an associate professor in 1999, and later became the Solle P. and Margaret Manasse Professor of Letters and Science from 2004 to 2011 and as the Hilldale Professor of Mathematics from 2008 to 2011. He was the Candler Professor of Mathematics at Emory University from 2010 to 2019. In 2019, Ono became the Thomas Jefferson Professor of Mathematics at the University of Virginia, where he was named the Marvin Rosenblum Professor of Mathematics and the chair of the Department of Mathematics in fall 2021. He ended his term as chair in Fall 2022 to become the STEM Advisor to the Provost at the University of Virginia.

Ono was the Vice President of the American Mathematical Society from 2018 to 2021. He is serving as the section chair for mathematics at the American Association for the Advancement of Science from 2020 to 2023.

In 2025 he went on leave from his position at the University of Virginia to work as "Founding Mathematician" of Axiom Math in Palo Alto, California to research the application of artificial intelligence to fundamental mathematics.

== Research ==
In 2000, Ono derived a theory of Ramanujan's congruences for the partition function with all prime moduli greater than 3. His paper was published in the Annals of Mathematics. In a joint work with Jan Bruinier, Ono discovered a finite algebraic formula for computing partition numbers.

In 2014, a joint paper by Michael J. Griffin, Ono, and S. Ole Warnaar provided a framework for the Rogers–Ramanujan identities and their arithmetic properties, solving a long-standing mystery stemming from the work of Ramanujan. The findings yield new formulas for algebraic numbers. Their work was ranked 15th among the top 100 stories of 2014 in science by Discover magazine.

In a 2015 joint paper co-authored with John Duncan and Michael Griffin, Ono helped prove the umbral moonshine conjecture. This conjecture was formulated by Miranda Cheng, John Duncan, and Jeff Harvey, and is a generalization of the monstrous moonshine conjecture proved by Richard Borcherds.

In May 2019, Ono published a joint paper (co-authored with Don Zagier and two former students) in the Proceedings of the National Academy of Sciences on the Riemann hypothesis. Their work proves a large portion of the Jensen-Polya criterion for the Riemann hypothesis. However, the Riemann hypothesis remains unsolved. Their work also establishes the Gaussian Unitary Ensemble random matrix condition in derivative aspect for the derivatives of the Riemann Xi function.

In 2024, he published (co-authored with William Craig and Jan-Willem van Ittersum) a paper which proves a new, unexpected way to identify prime numbers using the properties of integer partitions. In 2025 he was nominated for the Cozzarelli Prize.

Beginning in 2016, Ono has used mathematical analysis and modeling to advise elite competitive swimmers, including participants in the 2020 and 2024 Olympics.

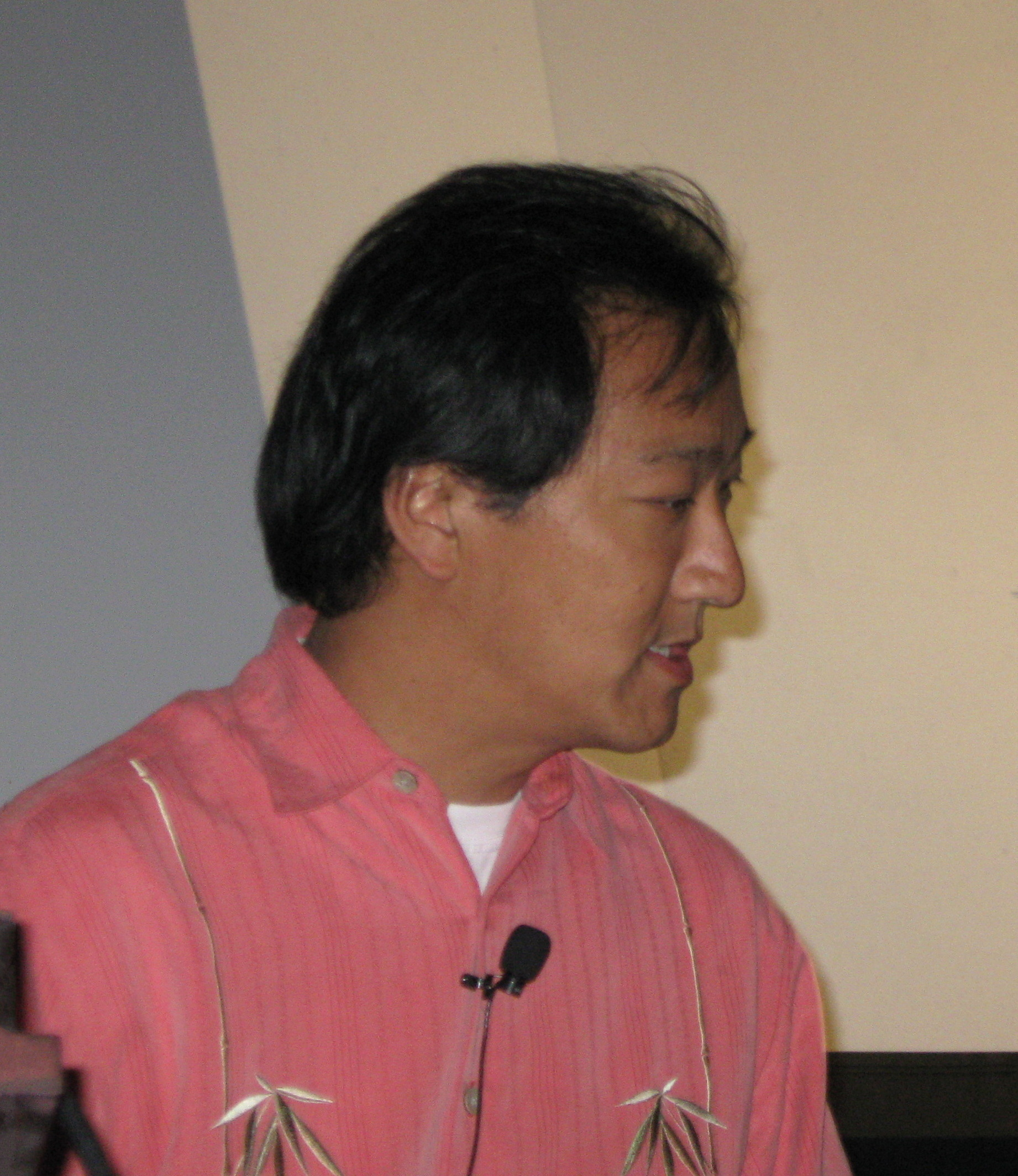
Ken Ono in 2009 at the Joint Mathematics Meetings.

== Media ==
Ono wrote, with Amir Aczel as coauthor, an autobiography, emphasizing the inspiration he gained from Ramanujan's mathematical research.

Ono was an Associate Producer and the mathematical consultant for the movie The Man Who Knew Infinity, which starred Jeremy Irons and Dev Patel, based on Ramanujan's biography written by Robert Kanigel.

He starred in a 2022 Super Bowl commercial for Miller Lite beer. He is on the Board of Directors of the Infinity Arts Foundation.

== Personal life ==
From 2012 to 2014, Ono has competed in World Triathlon Cross Championships events, representing the United States.

== Honors and awards ==
- National Security Agency Young Investigator (1997)
- National Science Foundation CAREER Award (1999)
- Sloan Research Fellowship (1999)
- Packard Fellowship for Science and Engineering (1999)
- Presidential Early Career Award for Scientists and Engineers from President Bill Clinton (2000)
- Guggenheim Fellowship (2003)
- National Science Foundation Director's Distinguished Teaching Scholar Award (2005)
- Fellow of the American Mathematical Society (2013)
- University of Chicago Alumni Award for Professional Achievement (2023)
- Effie Silver Award for Miller 64 Super Bowl ad (2023).
- Honorary Fellow of the Indian Academy of Sciences (2024).
- Fellow of the Asian American Scholar Forum (2024).

== Editorial boards ==
Ono is on the editorial board of several journals:

- Annals of Combinatorics
- Communications in Number Theory and Physics
- The Ramanujan Journal (Editor-in-Chief)
- Research in the Mathematical Sciences (Editor-in-Chief)
- Research in Number Theory (Editor-in-Chief)

== See also ==
- Ramanujan's ternary quadratic form
