= Sander P. Zwegers =

Dutch mathematician (born 1975)

Sander Pieter Zwegers (born April 16, 1975) is a Dutch mathematician known for making a connection between Maass forms and Srinivasa Ramanujan's mock theta functions in 2002. He was born in Oosterhout. After a period at the Max-Planck Institute in Bonn, he became an assistant professor at the University College Dublin in 2008. Since 2011, he has been professor of number theory at the University of Cologne.

== Research ==
In 1976, the American mathematician George Andrews found what is nowadays known as the "Lost Notebook" of Ramanujan. It contains many remarkable results, including the mysterious mock theta functions. This notebook contains what many specialists regard as Ramanujan’s deepest work. It was Sander Zwegers who, as a PhD student, had groundbreaking ideas how to fit the mock theta functions into a broader context. His 2002 PhD thesis has led to numerous publications and international conferences.

Zwegers' general area of interest is number theory. More specifically, he studies modular forms and variations thereof, such as Maass forms, mock modular forms, (indefinite) theta functions, and (Maass) Jacobi forms.

== Works ==
- Zwegers, S. P. (2001), "Mock θ-functions and real analytic modular forms", q-series with applications to combinatorics, number theory, and physics (Urbana, IL, 2000), Contemp. Math., vol. 291, Providence, R.I.: American Mathematical Society, pp. 269–277, ISBN 978-0-8218-2746-8, MR 1874536
- Zwegers, S. P. (2002), Mock Theta Functions, Utrecht PhD thesis, ISBN 90-393-3155-3
