= Don Zagier =

American mathematician

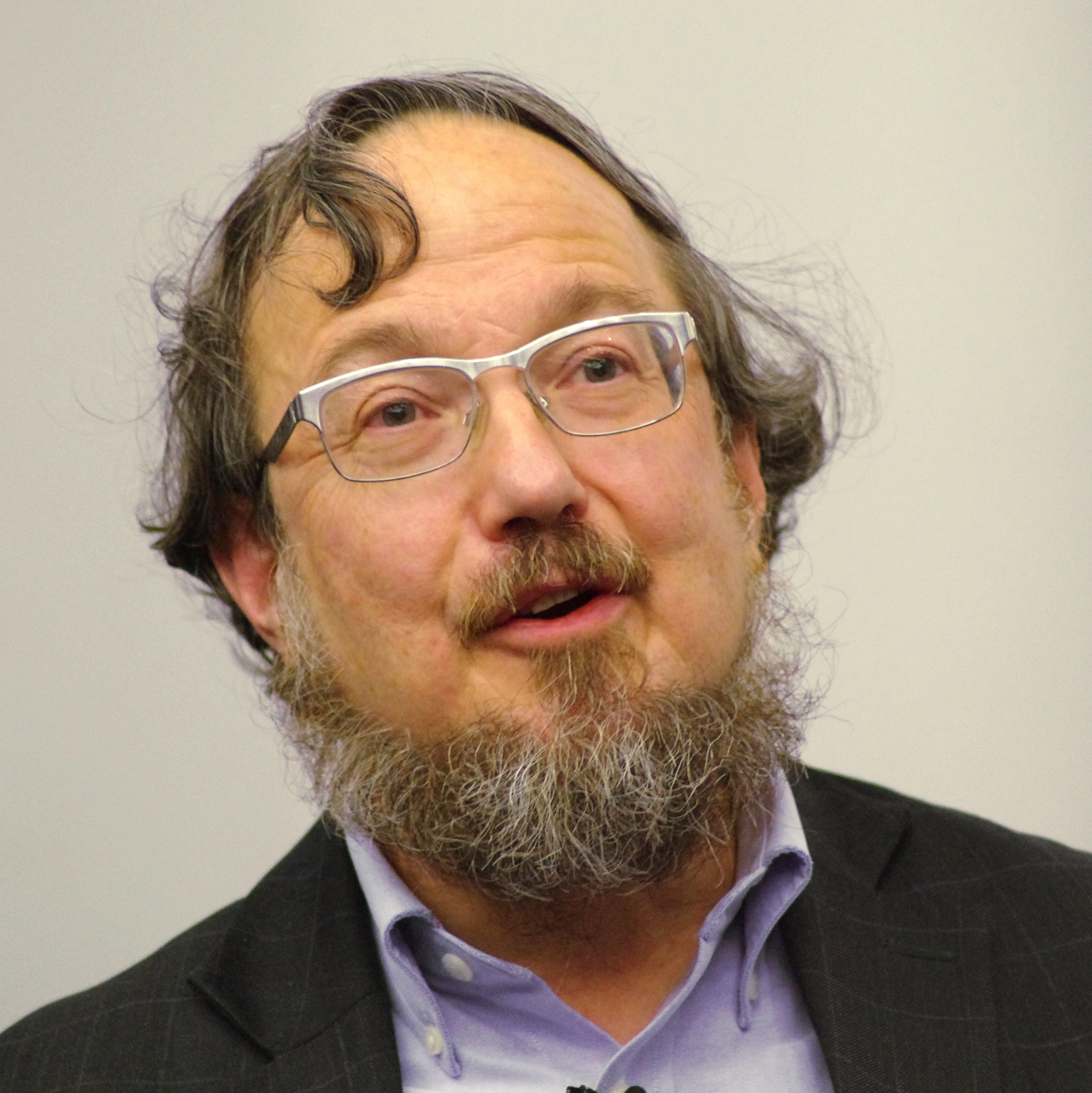
- Zagier at the British Mathematical Colloquium, London 2014
- Born: 29 June 1951 (age 75); Heidelberg, West Germany
- Education: University of Bonn
- Known for: Gross–Zagier theorem Herglotz–Zagier function Witten zeta function Jacobi form Period
- Awards: Cole Prize (1987); Chauvenet Prize (2000)
- Scientific career
- Fields: Mathematics
- Workplaces: Max Planck Institute for Mathematics; Collège de France; University of Maryland; ICTP
- Doctoral advisor: Friedrich Hirzebruch
- Doctoral students: Svetlana Katok; Maxim Kontsevich; Joseph Oesterlé; Maryna Viazovska; Sander P. Zwegers

Don Bernard Zagier (born 29 June 1951) is a German mathematician whose main area of work is number theory. He is currently one of the directors of the Max Planck Institute for Mathematics in Bonn, Germany. He was a professor at the Collège de France in Paris from 2006 to 2014. Since October 2014, he is also a Distinguished Staff Associate at the International Centre for Theoretical Physics (ICTP). Among his doctoral students are Fields medalists Maxim Kontsevich and Maryna Viazovska.

== Background ==
Zagier was born in Heidelberg, West Germany. His mother was a psychiatrist, and his father was the dean of instruction at the American College of Switzerland. His father held five different citizenships, and he spent his youth living in many different countries. After finishing high school (at age 13) and attending Winchester College for a year, he studied for three years at MIT, completing his bachelor's and master's degrees and being named a Putnam Fellow in 1967 at the age of 16. He then wrote a doctoral dissertation on characteristic classes under Friedrich Hirzebruch at Bonn, receiving his PhD at 20. He received his Habilitation at the age of 23, and was named professor at the age of 24.

== Work ==
Zagier collaborated with Hirzebruch in work on Hilbert modular surfaces. Hirzebruch and Zagier coauthored Intersection numbers of curves on Hilbert modular surfaces and modular forms of Nebentypus, where they proved that intersection numbers of algebraic cycles on a Hilbert modular surface occur as Fourier coefficients of a modular form. Stephen Kudla, John Millson and others generalized this result to intersection numbers of algebraic cycles on arithmetic quotients of symmetric spaces.

One of his results is a joint work with Benedict Gross (the so-called Gross–Zagier formula). This formula relates the first derivative of the complex L-series of an elliptic curve evaluated at 1 to the height of a certain Heegner point. This theorem has some applications, including implying cases of the Birch and Swinnerton-Dyer conjecture, along with being an ingredient to Dorian Goldfeld's solution of the class number problem. As a part of their work, Gross and Zagier found a formula for norms of differences of singular moduli. Zagier later found a formula for traces of singular moduli as Fourier coefficients of a weight 3/2 modular form.

Zagier collaborated with John Harer to calculate the orbifold Euler characteristics of moduli spaces of algebraic curves, relating them to special values of the Riemann zeta function.

Zagier found a formula for the value of the Dedekind zeta function of an arbitrary number field at s = 2 in terms of the dilogarithm function, by studying arithmetic hyperbolic 3-manifolds. He later formulated a general conjecture giving formulas for special values of Dedekind zeta functions in terms of polylogarithm functions.

He discovered a short and elementary proof of Fermat's theorem on sums of two squares.

Zagier won the Cole Prize in Number Theory in 1987, the Chauvenet Prize in 2000, the von Staudt Prize in 2001, the Heinz Gumin Prize in 2024 and the Gauss Lectureship of the German Mathematical Society in 2007. He became a foreign member of the Royal Netherlands Academy of Arts and Sciences in 1997 and a member of the National Academy of Sciences (NAS) of the United States in 2017.

== Selected publications ==
- Zagier, D. (1990), "A One-Sentence Proof That Every Prime p ≡ 1 (mod 4) Is a Sum of Two Squares", The American Mathematical Monthly, 97 (2), Mathematical Association of America: 144, doi:10.2307/2323918, JSTOR 2323918.
- Zagier, Don (1977). "The First 50 Million Prime Numbers". The Mathematical Intelligencer. 1 (Suppl 2). Springer: 7–19. doi:10.1007/BF03039306.
- Hirzebruch, F.; Zagier, D. (1976). "Intersection numbers of curves on Hilbert modular surfaces and modular forms of Nebentypus". Inventiones Mathematicae. 36 (1). Springer Science and Business Media LLC: 57–113. Bibcode:1976InMat..36...57H. doi:10.1007/bf01390005. hdl:21.11116/0000-0004-399B-E. ISSN 0020-9910. S2CID 56568473.
- Zagier, Don (1986). "Hyperbolic manifolds and special values of Dedekind zeta-functions". Inventiones Mathematicae. 83 (2). Springer Science and Business Media LLC: 285–301. Bibcode:1986InMat..83..285Z. doi:10.1007/bf01388964. ISSN 0020-9910. S2CID 67757648.
- "On singular moduli". Journal für die reine und angewandte Mathematik (Crelle's Journal). 1985 (355). Walter de Gruyter GmbH: 191–220. 1 January 1985. doi:10.1515/crll.1985.355.191. ISSN 0075-4102. S2CID 117887979.
- Gross, Benedict H.; Zagier, Don B. (1986). "Heegner points and derivatives of L-series". Inventiones Mathematicae. 84 (2). Springer Science and Business Media LLC: 225–320. Bibcode:1986InMat..84..225G. doi:10.1007/bf01388809. ISSN 0020-9910. S2CID 125716869.
- Harer, J.; Zagier, D. (1986). "The Euler characteristic of the moduli space of curves". Inventiones Mathematicae. 85 (3). Springer Science and Business Media LLC: 457–485. arXiv:math/0506083. Bibcode:1986InMat..85..457H. doi:10.1007/bf01390325. ISSN 0020-9910. S2CID 8471412.
- Gross, B.; Kohnen, W.; Zagier, D. (1987). "Heegner points and derivatives of L-series. II". Mathematische Annalen. 278 (1–4). Springer Science and Business Media LLC: 497–562. doi:10.1007/bf01458081. ISSN 0025-5831. S2CID 121652706.
- Zagier, Don (1991). "The Birch-Swinnerton-Dyer Conjecture from a Naive Point of View". Arithmetic Algebraic Geometry. Boston, MA: Birkhäuser Boston. pp. 377–389. doi:10.1007/978-1-4612-0457-2_18. ISBN 978-1-4612-6769-0.
- Zagier, Don (1991). "Polylogarithms, Dedekind Zeta Functions, and the Algebraic K-Theory of Fields". Arithmetic Algebraic Geometry. Boston, MA: Birkhäuser Boston. pp. 391–430. doi:10.1007/978-1-4612-0457-2_19. ISBN 978-1-4612-6769-0.
- Zagier, Don (1990). "How Often Should You Beat Your Kids?". Mathematics Magazine. 63 (2). Informa UK Limited: 89–92. doi:10.1080/0025570x.1990.11977493. ISSN 0025-570X.

== See also ==
- Rankin–Cohen bracket
- Monster Lie algebra
