= Robert Kanigel =

American biographer and science writer (born 1946)

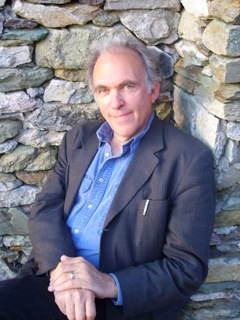
- Born: May 28, 1946 (age 80)
- Website: Official website

Robert Kanigel (born May 28, 1946) is an American biographer and science writer, known as the author of eleven books and hundreds of articles, essays, and reviews.

== Early life and education ==
Born in Brooklyn, Kanigel graduated from Stuyvesant High School in New York City, and received a B.S. in Mechanical Engineering from Rensselaer Polytechnic Institute.

== Career ==
After college, he held three engineering jobs before becoming a freelance writer in 1970. Over the next 30 years, Kanigel lived and wrote in Baltimore, Maryland and San Francisco, California. His articles appeared in magazines including The New York Times Magazine, New York Times Book Review, Wilson Quarterly, Washington Post, Los Angeles Times, Science 85, The Sciences, and as contributing editor in Johns Hopkins Magazine.

His first book, Apprentice to Genius: The Making of a Scientific Dynasty, was published in 1986. This was followed by The Man Who Knew Infinity: A Life of the Genius Ramanujan in 1991; The One Best Way: Frederick Winslow Taylor and the Enigma of Efficiency in 1999; High Season: How One French Riviera Town Has Seduced Travelers for Two Thousand Years in 2002; and Faux Real: Genuine Leather and 200 Years of Inspired Fakes in 2007. Vintage Reading: From Plato to Bradbury, a Personal Tour of Some of the World's Best Books, published in 1998, is a compilation of 80 book reviews.

In 1999, Kanigel became professor of science writing at the Massachusetts Institute of Technology, where he helped start its Graduate Program in Science Writing, which he directed for seven years. In 2011, he returned to live and write in Baltimore.

On An Irish Island, published in 2012, is an ensemble biography of the scholars, linguists, and writers who visited Ireland's Blasket Islands during the early twentieth century.

Eyes on the Street: The Life of Jane Jacobs, published in 2016, is a biography of Jane Jacobs, one of the foremost urbanists of the 20th century. Kanigel's biography was longlisted for the 2017 Andrew Carnegie Medal in Nonfiction.

While researching one of the subjects of On An Irish Island, George Derwent Thomson, Kanigel came across the ideas of Milman Parry, the "Darwin of Homeric Studies". Kanigel followed his interest and wrote a biography released in 2021 as Hearing Homer's Song: The Brief Life and Big Idea of Milman Parry.

== Awards and honors ==
- John Simon Guggenheim Memorial Foundation Fellowship, 2008
- Alfred P. Sloan Foundation grant, 2005
- Jennie Mae and Ellis L. Krause Lecture, Marietta College, Ohio, 2001
- Class of 1960 Innovation in Education Award, MIT, 2003
- Alfred and Julia Hill Lecture on Science, Society, and Mass Media, University of Tennessee, Knoxville, 1999
- Global Business Book Awards (Financial Times/Booz-Allen & Hamilton) finalist, biography, 1997
- American Society of Journalists and Authors Author of the Year, 1998
- Elizabeth Lewisohn Eisenstein Prize, National Coalition of Independent Scholars, 1994
- Alfred P. Sloan Foundation grant, technology book series, 1992
- National Book Critics Circle Award finalist, biography, 1992
- Los Angeles Times Book Prize finalist, science and technology, 1991
- James T. Grady-James H. Stack Award for Interpreting Chemistry for the Public, American Chemical Society, 1989
- A.D. Emmart Award for Writing in the Humanities, Maryland, 1979

== Works ==
=== Nonfiction ===
Biographies

- Apprentice to Genius: The Making of a Scientific Dynasty. Macmillan hardcover, 1986. Johns Hopkins University Press paperback, 1993. Taiwanese edition, Commonwealth Publishing, 1998. Chinese edition, Shanghai Scientific, 2001. ISBN 0-8018-4757-5
- The Man Who Knew Infinity: A Life of the Genius Ramanujan. Scribner's hardcover, 1991. U.K. hardcover, Scribner's, 1991. Washington Square Press paperback, 1992. U.K. paperback, Abacus, 1992. Indian edition, Rupa, 1992. German edition, Vieweg Verlag, 1993. Cassette book, National Library for the Blind, 1993. Japanese edition, Kousakusha, 1994. Korean edition, Science Books, 2000. Chinese editions, Shanghai Scientific, 2002, 2008. Italian edition, Rizzoli, 2003. Thai edition, Matichon, 2007. Audio edition, Blackstone Audio, 2007. Greek edition, Travlos, 2008. ISBN 0-671-75061-5
- The One Best Way: Frederick Winslow Taylor and the Enigma of Efficiency. Viking hardcover, 1997. U.K. hardcover, Little, Brown 1997. Penguin paperback, 1999. U.K. paperback, Abacus, 2000. MIT Press paperback, 2005. ISBN 0-14-026080-3
- Eyes on the Street: The Life of Jane Jacobs. Knopf, 2016. ISBN 978-0307961907
- Kanigel, Robert (2021). Hearing Homer's Song: The Brief Life and Big Idea of Milman Parry. Knopf. ISBN 978-0525520948.

Guides

- Vintage Reading: From Plato to Bradbury, a Personal Tour of Some of the World's Best Books. Bancroft Press, 1998. E-book edition, 2010. ISBN 0-9631246-7-6
- Ideas Into Words: Mastering the Craft of Science Writing. 2004. Co-author: Elise Hancock

History

- High Season: How One French Riviera Town Has Seduced Travelers for Two Thousand Years. Viking hardcover, 2002. UK hardcover [High Season in Nice] Little, Brown, 2002. UK paperback, Abacus, 2003. ISBN 0-670-89988-7
- Faux Real: Genuine Leather and 200 Years of Inspired Fakes. Joseph Henry Press hardback, 2007. University of Pennsylvania Press paperback, 2010. ZheJiang University Press Chinese edition, 2013. ISBN 0-309-10236-7
- On An Irish Island. Knopf. 2012. ISBN 978-0-307-26959-1
