= C. S. Venkataraman =

Indian mathematician (1918–1994)

C.S. Venkataraman
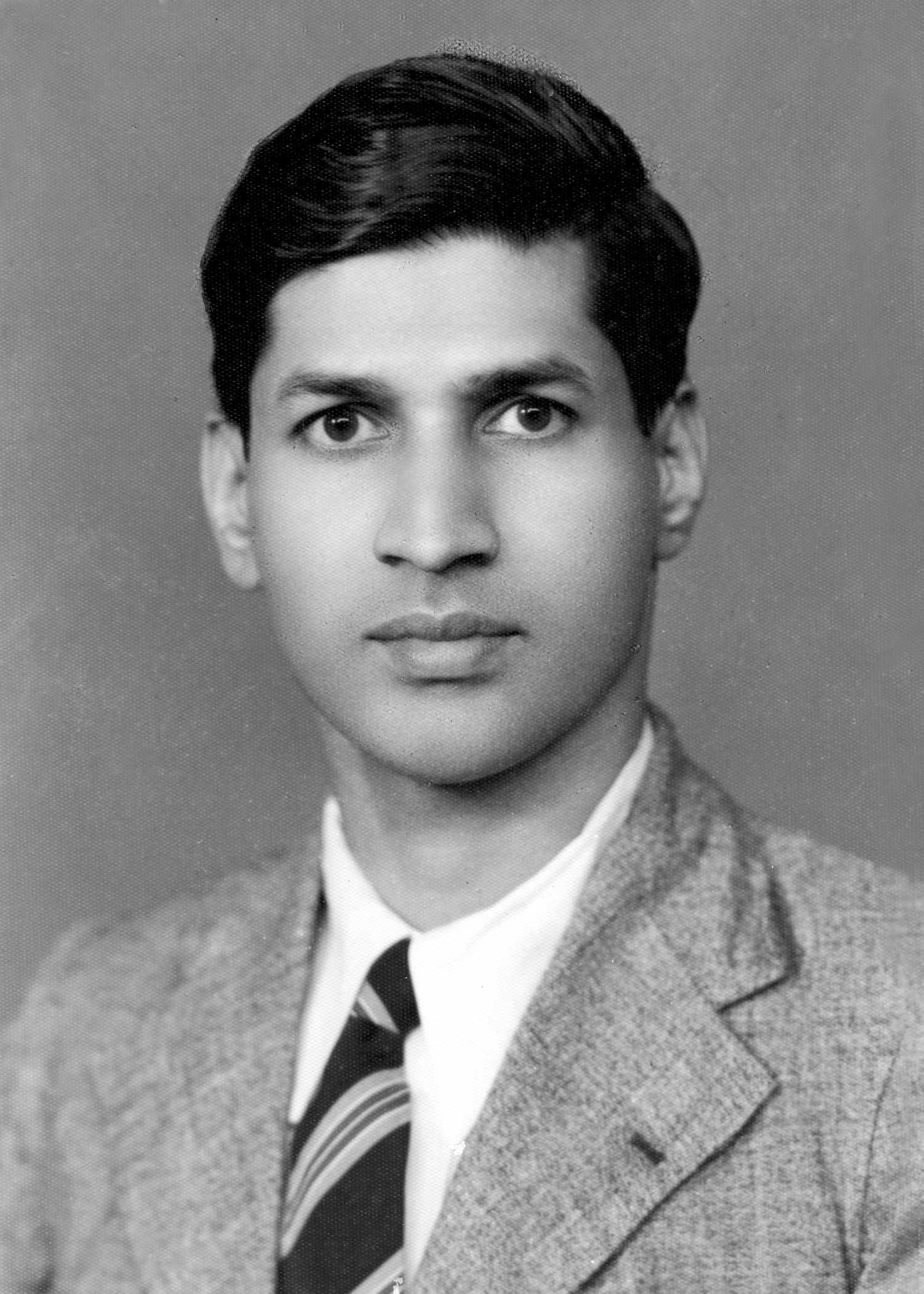
- Born: 14 September 1918; Chelakkara, India
- Died: 16 March 1994 (aged 75); Thrissur, Kerala, India
- Education: Presidency College, Madras
- Known for: Contributions to Theory of numbers
- Scientific career
- Fields: Mathematics
- Workplaces: Sree Kerala Varma College, Thrissur; Union Christian College, Aluva
- Doctoral advisor: R. Vaidyanathaswamy
- Other academic advisors: K. Ananda Rau

My Master - P V Vaidyanathan

C. S. Venkataraman (14 September 1918 – 16 March 1994), popularly known as CSV, was a mathematician from Kerala, India. He specialized in number theory, in particular the theory of arithmetic functions.

Known to his friends as CSV, Venkataraman was born at Chelakkara, a small village in Thrissur District, India, on 14 September 1918. He was the son of C. V. Subbarama Iyer, who was a professor of mathematics and later principal at the University College, Trivandrum. He died on 16 March 1994.

After his early education in his native village and in Trivandrum, he attended university at the Presidency College, Chennai, where he had the opportunity of studying under K. Ananda Rau, who was a contemporary and friend of Srinivasa Ramanujan and a student of G. H. Hardy at the University of Cambridge. Venkataraman was inspired to become a mathematician by Ananda Rau. He was also at this time introduced to mathematician R. Vaidyanathaswamy, who had already established himself at the University of Madras in the 1930s and had set up a tradition and an academic atmosphere that gave Madras international recognition in the field of mathematics. Venkataraman was selected as a research scholar at the University of Madras to do research in the theory of arithmetic functions under the guidance of Vaidyanathaswamy. There, he found himself in the company of senior research scholars like P. Kesava Menon and K. G. Ramanathan. The burgeoning theory of multiplicative functions formed the material for the dissertations of Venkataraman and Kesava Menon. The theory of arithmetic functions had been initiated in the 1930s by E. T. Bell of the California Institute of Technology and independently by Vaidyanathaswamy. Venkataraman expounded the theory in a series of well-regarded research papers, and was awarded a Ph.D. by the University of Madras in 1952 for "Contributions to the Theory of Multiplicative Functions". In this work, he had derived a new identity for multiplicative functions of two variables—his novel identity included Vaidyanathaswamy's identity as a consequence.

In view of his contributions to number theory, Venkataraman was nominated for a visiting professorship at the University of North Carolina in order to set up a possible collaboration with Leonard Carlitz, who had learned of Venkataraman's research interests. Though Venkataraman wanted to continue with full-time research, familial circumstances forced him to remain near his hometown and so he accepted an offer of a lectureship at Union Christian College, Aluva. After spending a brief time there, he joined Sree Kerala Varma College, Thrissur, in 1947, where he remained as a professor until retirement. Sree Kerala Varma College was not considered among the elite league of colleges in Kerala, and was referred to as a "common man's college". Because of his passion for research and teaching, Venkataraman also did not accept the post of the principal despite its having been offered to him at a very young age. Furthermore, due to Venkataraman's active interest in research, the Department of Mathematics of Sree Kerala Varma College was recognized as a research center for mathematics by the University of Kerala in 1961. A.C. Vasu and R. Sivaramakrishnan were his doctoral students.

Venkataraman was a member of the Indian Mathematical Society since 1945—he was a towering figure in higher mathematics in Kerala for more than three decades, was well known by mathematicians across India, and often represented Kerala at conferences and meetings. He appeared in the World Directory of Mathematicians, published in 1986 under the auspices of the International Mathematical Union. Venkataraman has often been regarded as one in a line of world-class number theorists to come from Kerala, among them his predecessors S. S. Pillai (who Hardy described as Ramanujan's worthy successor) and Kesava Menon. The Ramanujan Mathematical Society has instituted an annual endowment lecture in his honor.
