= Ramanujan Mathematical Society =

Indian organisation of persons who helped significantly in promoting mathematics

- Formation: 1985
- Headquarters: Tiruchirappalli, Tamil Nadu, India
- President: Ravi S. Kulkarni
- Website: http://www.ramanujanmathsociety.org/

Ramanujan Mathematical Society is an Indian organisation of persons formed with the aim of "promoting mathematics at all levels". The Society was founded in 1985 and registered in Tiruchirappalli, Tamil Nadu, India. Professor G. Shankaranarayanan was the first President, Professor R. Balakrishnan the first Secretary and Professor E. Sampathkumar the first Academic Secretary. The initial impetus for the formation of the Society was the deeply felt need of a new mathematical journal and the necessity of an organisation to launch and nourish the journal.

== Publications ==
Cover page of December 2004 issue of the Journal of Ramanujan Mathematical Society

The publications of Ramanujan Mathematical Society include the following:

- Mathematics Newsletter: A journal catering to the needs of students, research scholars, and teachers. The Newsletter was launched in the year 1991 with Professor R Balakrishnan as Chief Editor. Currently, Professor S Ponnusamy of IIT Madras is the Chief Editor.
- Journal of the Ramanujan Mathematical Society : The Journal was started in 1986 with Professor K S Padmanabhan as Editor-in-Chief. Initially, it was a biannual Journal. Now it has four issues per year. The present Editor-in-Chief is Professor R Parimala of Emory University, Atlanta, United States and the Managing Editor is Professor E Sampathkumar of University of Mysore.
- Little Mathematical Treasures: This is envisaged as a series of books addressed to mathematically mature readers and to bright students. So far only one book has been published under this series: "Adventures in Iteration" by Dr Shilesh A Shirali.
- RMS Lecture Notes Series in Mathematics: This is a series consisting of monographs and proceedings of conferences.

== Endowment lectures ==
The Society organises the following endowment lectures every year.

- Professor W H Abdi Memorial Lecture: The lectures were started in the year 2000 and are sponsored by Department of Mathematics, Cochin University of Science and Technology, of which Professor Wazir Hasan Abdi (1922–1999) was the Head during the period 1977–1982.
- Professor C S Venkataraman Memorial Lectures: The lectures, started in 1996, are sponsored by Dr C S Venkataraman Memorial Trust, Thrissur, Kerala State.
- Professor M N Gopalan Endowment Lectures: The lectures, started in 2000, are sponsored by Professor M N Gopalan, Mysore.
- Prof J N Kapur Endowment Lectures: The lectures, started in 2002, are sponsored by Professor J N Kapur, New Delhi.

New members are taken in based on their achievements and capabilities.

== Executive committee ==
President	Master Siddharth soni, Bhaskaracharya Pratishthana, Hyderabad.
Vice President	Prof. Dinesh Singh, Vice Chancellor, University of Delhi.
Member	Prof. Mahuya Datta, Indian Statistical Institute, Kolkata.
Academic Secretary	Prof. S. Kumaresan, University of Hyderabad.
Treasurer	Prof K Srinivas, Institute of Mathematical Sciences, Chennai.
Newest member	Master Aryan pashuparty, P obul teddy, Hyderabad
