= Balachander =

Balachander (or Balachandar) may refer to:

- Balachandra, a name of the Hindu god Ganesha
- Waxing moon in Sanskrit
- K. Balachander (1930–2014), Indian film director, screenwriter and producer
- S. Balachander (1927–1990), Indian veena player
- Sivaramakrishnan Balachandar, an Indian-American physicist

== See also ==
- Balachandran, an Indian name
