= Yogananda =

Yogananda (योगानंद, Yōgānanda) is a Sanskrit name meaning Yoga bliss. Notable individuals with this name include:

- D. Yoganand, Indian film director
- C. S. Yogananda, Indian mathematician
- Paramahansa Yogananda, Indian yoga teacher who introduced Yoga to the United States
- Swami Yogananda, 19th-century Indian mystic
- Yogananda Pittman, the first African-American chief of the United States Capitol Police

It may also refer to:

- Yogananda Street, a street in Sandy Hook, CT, which included notably the residence of Adam Lanza
