= Four exponentials conjecture =

In mathematics, specifically the field of transcendental number theory, the four exponentials conjecture is a conjecture which, given the right conditions on the exponents, would guarantee the transcendence of at least one of four exponentials. The conjecture, along with two related, stronger conjectures, is at the top of a hierarchy of conjectures and theorems concerning the arithmetic nature of a certain number of values of the exponential function.

== Statement ==
If x_{1}, x_{2} and y_{1}, y_{2} are two pairs of complex numbers, with each pair being linearly independent over the rational numbers, then at least one of the following four numbers is transcendental:

$$e^{x_1y_1}, e^{x_1y_2}, e^{x_2y_1}, e^{x_2y_2}.$$

An alternative way of stating the conjecture in terms of logarithms is the following. For 1 ≤ i, j ≤ 2 let λ_{ij} be complex numbers such that exp(λ_{ij}) are all algebraic. Suppose λ_{11} and λ_{12} are linearly independent over the rational numbers, and λ_{11} and λ_{21} are also linearly independent over the rational numbers, then

$$\lambda_{11}\lambda_{22}\neq\lambda_{12}\lambda_{21}.\,$$

An equivalent formulation in terms of linear algebra is the following. Let M be the 2×2 matrix

$$M=\begin{pmatrix}\lambda_{11}&\lambda_{12} \\ \lambda_{21}&\lambda_{22}\end{pmatrix},$$

where exp(λ_{ij}) is algebraic for 1 ≤ i, j ≤ 2. Suppose the two rows of M are linearly independent over the rational numbers, and the two columns of M are linearly independent over the rational numbers. Then the rank of M is 2.

While a 2×2 matrix having linearly independent rows and columns usually means it has rank 2, in this case we require linear independence over a smaller field so the rank isn't forced to be 2. For example, the matrix

$$\begin{pmatrix}1&\pi \\ \pi&\pi^2\end{pmatrix}$$

has rows and columns that are linearly independent over the rational numbers, since π is irrational. But the rank of the matrix is 1. So in this case the conjecture would imply that at least one of e, e^{π}, and e^{π^{2}} is transcendental (which in this case is already known since e is transcendental).

== History ==
The conjecture was considered in the early 1940s by Atle Selberg who never formally stated the conjecture. A special case of the conjecture is mentioned in a 1944 paper of Leonidas Alaoglu and Paul Erdős who suggest that it had been considered by Carl Ludwig Siegel. An equivalent statement was first mentioned in print by Theodor Schneider who set it as the first of eight important, open problems in transcendental number theory in 1957.

The related six exponentials theorem was first explicitly mentioned in the 1960s by Serge Lang and Kanakanahalli Ramachandra, and both also explicitly conjecture the above result. Indeed, after proving the six exponentials theorem Lang mentions the difficulty in dropping the number of exponents from six to four — the proof used for six exponentials "just misses" when one tries to apply it to four.

== Corollaries ==
Using Euler's identity this conjecture implies the transcendence of many numbers involving e and π. For example, taking x_{1} = 1, x_{2} = √2, y_{1} = iπ, and y_{2} = iπ√2, the conjecture—if true—implies that one of the following four numbers is transcendental:

$$e^{i\pi}, e^{i\pi\sqrt{2}}, e^{i\pi\sqrt{2}}, e^{2i\pi}.$$

The first of these is just −1, and the fourth is 1, so the conjecture implies that e^{iπ√2} is transcendental (which is already known, by consequence of the Gelfond–Schneider theorem).

An open problem in number theory settled by the conjecture is the question of whether there exists a non-integer real number t such that both 2^{t} and 3^{t} are integers, or indeed such that a^{t} and b^{t} are both integers for some pair of integers a and b that are multiplicatively independent over the integers. Values of t such that 2^{t} is an integer are all of the form t = log_{2}m for some integer m, while for 3^{t} to be an integer, t must be of the form t = log_{3}n for some integer n. By setting x_{1} = 1, x_{2} = t, y_{1} = log(2), and y_{2} = log(3), the four exponentials conjecture implies that if t is irrational then one of the following four numbers is transcendental:

$$2, 3, 2^t, 3^t.\,$$

So if 2^{t} and 3^{t} are both integers then the conjecture implies that t must be a rational number. Since the only rational numbers t for which 2^{t} is also rational are the integers, this implies that there are no non-integer real numbers t such that both 2^{t} and 3^{t} are integers. It is this consequence, for any two primes (not just 2 and 3), that Alaoglu and Erdős desired in their paper as it would imply the conjecture that the quotient of two consecutive colossally abundant numbers is prime, extending Ramanujan's results on the quotients of consecutive superior highly composite number.

== Sharp four exponentials conjecture ==
The four exponentials conjecture reduces the pair and triplet of complex numbers in the hypotheses of the six exponentials theorem to two pairs. It is conjectured that this is also possible with the sharp six exponentials theorem, and this is the sharp four exponentials conjecture. Specifically, this conjecture claims that if x_{1}, x_{2}, and y_{1}, y_{2} are two pairs of complex numbers with each pair being linearly independent over the rational numbers, and if β_{ij} are four algebraic numbers for 1 ≤ i, j ≤ 2 such that the following four numbers are algebraic:

$$e^{x_1 y_1-\beta_{11}}, e^{x_1 y_2-\beta_{12}}, e^{x_2 y_1-\beta_{21}}, e^{x_2 y_2-\beta_{22}},$$

then x_{i} y_{j} = β_{ij} for 1 ≤ i, j ≤ 2. So all four exponentials are in fact 1.

This conjecture implies both the sharp six exponentials theorem, which requires a third x value, and the as yet unproven sharp five exponentials conjecture that requires a further exponential to be algebraic in its hypotheses.

== Strong four exponentials conjecture ==
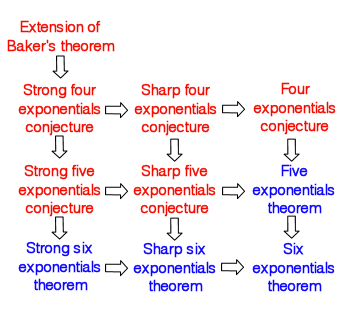
The logical implications between the various problems in this circle. Those in red are as yet unproven while those in blue are known results. The top most result refers to that discussed at Baker's theorem, while the lower two rows are detailed at the six exponentials theorem article.

The strongest result that has been conjectured in this circle of problems is the strong four exponentials conjecture. This result would imply both aforementioned conjectures concerning four exponentials as well as all the five and six exponentials conjectures and theorems, as illustrated to the right, and all the three exponentials conjectures detailed below. The statement of this conjecture deals with the vector space over the algebraic numbers generated by 1 and all logarithms of non-zero algebraic numbers, denoted here as L^{∗}. So L^{∗} is the set of all complex numbers of the form

$$\beta_0+\sum_{i=1}^n \beta_i\log\alpha_i,$$

for some n ≥ 0, where all the β_{i} and α_{i} are algebraic and every branch of the logarithm is considered. The statement of the strong four exponentials conjecture is then as follows. Let x_{1}, x_{2}, and y_{1}, y_{2} be two pairs of complex numbers with each pair being linearly independent over the algebraic numbers, then at least one of the four numbers x_{i} y_{j} for 1 ≤ i, j ≤ 2 is not in L^{∗}.

== Three exponentials conjecture ==
The four exponentials conjecture rules out a special case of non-trivial, homogeneous, quadratic relations between logarithms of algebraic numbers. But a conjectural extension of Baker's theorem implies that there should be no non-trivial algebraic relations between logarithms of algebraic numbers at all, homogeneous or not. One case of non-homogeneous quadratic relations is covered by the still open three exponentials conjecture. In its logarithmic form it is the following conjecture. Let λ_{1}, λ_{2}, and λ_{3} be any three logarithms of algebraic numbers and γ be a non-zero algebraic number, and suppose that λ_{1}λ_{2} = γλ_{3}. Then λ_{1}λ_{2} = γλ_{3} = 0.

The exponential form of this conjecture is the following. Let x_{1}, x_{2}, and y be non-zero complex numbers and let γ be a non-zero algebraic number. Then at least one of the following three numbers is transcendental:

$$e^{x_1y}, e^{x_2y}, e^{\gamma x_1/x_2}.$$

There is also a sharp three exponentials conjecture which claims that if x_{1}, x_{2}, and y are non-zero complex numbers and α, β_{1}, β_{2}, and γ are algebraic numbers such that the following three numbers are algebraic

$$e^{x_1 y-\beta_1}, e^{x_2 y-\beta_2}, e^{(\gamma x_1/x_2)-\alpha},$$

then either x_{2}y = β_{2} or γx_{1} = αx_{2}.

The strong three exponentials conjecture meanwhile states that if x_{1}, x_{2}, and y are non-zero complex numbers with x_{1}y, x_{2}y, and x_{1}/x_{2} all transcendental, then at least one of the three numbers x_{1}y, x_{2}y, x_{1}/x_{2} is not in L^{∗}.

As with the other results in this family, the strong three exponentials conjecture implies the sharp three exponentials conjecture which implies the three exponentials conjecture. However, the strong and sharp three exponentials conjectures are implied by their four exponentials counterparts, bucking the usual trend. And the three exponentials conjecture is neither implied by nor implies the four exponentials conjecture.

The three exponentials conjecture, like the sharp five exponentials conjecture, would imply the transcendence of e^{π^{2}} by letting (in the logarithmic version) λ_{1} = iπ, λ_{2} = −iπ, and γ = 1.

== Bertrand's conjecture ==
Many of the theorems and results in transcendental number theory concerning the exponential function have analogues involving the modular function j. Writing q = e^{2πiτ} for the nome and j(τ) = J(q), Daniel Bertrand conjectured that if q_{1} and q_{2} are non-zero algebraic numbers in the complex unit disc that are multiplicatively independent, then J(q_{1}) and J(q_{2}) are algebraically independent over the rational numbers. Although not obviously related to the four exponentials conjecture, Bertrand's conjecture in fact implies a special case known as the weak four exponentials conjecture. This conjecture states that if x_{1} and x_{2} are two positive real algebraic numbers, neither of them equal to 1, then π^{2} and the product log(x_{1})log(x_{2}) are linearly independent over the rational numbers. This corresponds to the special case of the four exponentials conjecture whereby y_{1} = iπ, y_{2} = −iπ, and x_{1} and x_{2} are real. Perhaps surprisingly, though, it is also a corollary of Bertrand's conjecture, suggesting there may be an approach to the full four exponentials conjecture via the modular function j.

== See also ==
- Schanuel's conjecture
