= Balachandran =

Balachandran is an Indian surname. Notable people with the surname include:

- Balachandran Chullikkadu (born 1957), Indian poet, orator, lyricist, and author
- Aiyalam Parameswaran Balachandran (1938–2025), Indian theoretical physicist
- M. Balachandran (born 1947), Indian banker
