= Ramanujan (disambiguation) =

Srinivasa Ramanujan (1887–1920) was an Indian mathematician.

Ramanujan may refer to:

== Names of people ==
- Ramanujan (name), a Tamil and Malayalam name
- A. K. Ramanujan was an Indian poet and scholar
- Amita Ramanujan is a fictional character from the CBS crime drama Numb3rs
- Ramanujan Hegde is a group leader at the Medical Research Council (MRC)
- Ramanuja was an eleventh century Indian philosopher, Hindu theologian and social reformer

== Names of places ==
- Ramanujan College is a constituent college of the Delhi University
- Ramanujan IT City is an information technology (IT) special economic zone
- Ramanujan Institute for Advanced Study in Mathematics is the Department of Mathematics of University of Madras

== Miscellaneous ==
- Ramanujan machine is a specialised software package developed at Technion
- The Ramanujan Journal is a scientific journal
- Hardy–Ramanujan Journal is a mathematical journal
- Ramanujan (film), a 2014 Indian biographical film by Gnana Rajasekara about the mathematician Srinivasa Ramanujan
- Ramanujan Prize (disambiguation)

== See also ==
- List of things named after Srinivasa Ramanujan
- Ramanujan prime
- Ramanujan Prize (disambiguation)
- Ramanujan summation, a technique invented by the mathematician Srinivasa Ramanujan
