= Ramanujan (name) =

Ramanuja, Ramanujan, Ramanujam is a Tamil and Malayalam name literally meaning 'the younger brother of Rama' mostly referring to Lakshmana. The name is derived from Ramanuja, a Sanskrit compound consisting of the terms rāma and anuja (अनुज). The name however is rarely used by Malayalis themselves nowadays and has come to be known as a common name used by the Tamil Iyengar community. The most famous personalities with this name are the 11th century philosopher Ramanuja and the Malayali poet Ramanujan Ezhuthachan. Ramanujan is also the name for Srinivasa Ramanujan (1887–1920), an Indian mathematician who is considered by many to be one of the most talented mathematicians in history.

== People with the name ==
- Ramanuja (1017–1137), Hindu theologian, philosopher, and exponent of the Sri Vaishnavism tradition
- A. K. Ramanujan (1929–1993), Indian author, who wrote in both English and Kannada
- Abinandhan Ramanujam, Indian cinematographer
- C. P. Ramanujam (1938–1974), Indian mathematician who worked on number theory and algebraic geometry
- Dheepa Ramanujam, Indian film actress who appears in Tamil films
- Gopala Ramanujam (1915–2001), former Governor of Goa and Orissa
- Ramanujam Varatharaja Perumal, director of the Indian Space Research Organisation
- Ramanujan Srinivasan (1938–1984), Indian physicist
- Thunchaththu Ramanujan Ezhuthachan, poet, considered the father of the Malayalam language

Fictional characters

- Amita Ramanujan, a fictional mathematician on the TV show, NUMB3RS
