= Ramanujan Prize =

Ramanujan Prize may refer to:

- SASTRA Ramanujan Prize awarded by the Shanmugha Arts, Science, Technology and Research Academy
- ICTP Ramanujan Prize, awarded by the International Centre for Theoretical Physics
- Srinivasa Ramanujan Medal, awarded by the Indian National Science Academy

== See also ==
- Ramanujan (disambiguation)
