= Indumati =

Indumati or Indumathi may refer to:

- Indumati, in Hindu mythology, the consort of Aja of Kosala
- Indumathi (film), 2009 Indian film
- Indumati, a fictional princess in the Indian animated series Chhota Bheem
- Indumati Bhattacharya, Indian politician
- Indumati Chimanlal Sheth, Indian politician and educationist
- Indumathi D., Indian particle physicist
- Indumati Gopinathan, Indian pathologist
- Indumati Babuji Patankar, Indian activist
- Indumathi Kathiresan, Indian football player
