= Srinivasa Ramanujan Medal =

Award given for works in the mathematical sciences

The Srinivasa Ramanujan Medal, named after the Indian mathematician Srinivasa Ramanujan, is awarded by the Indian National Science Academy for work in the mathematical sciences.

Past recipients include:

- 1962 – S. Chandrasekhar
- 1964 – B. P. Pal
- 1966 – K. S. Chandrasekharan
- 1968 – P. C. Mahalanobis
- 1972 – G. N. Ramachandran
- 1974 – Harish-Chandra
- 1979 – R. P. Bambah
- 1982 – S. Chowla
- 1985 – C. S. Seshadri
- 1988 – M. S. Narasimhan
- 1991 – M. S. Raghunathan
- 1997 – K. Ramachandra
- 2003 – C. R. Rao
- 2006 – R. Parimala
- 2008 – S. Ramanan
- 2013 – K. R. Parthasarathy
- 2016 – Tyakal Nanjundiah Venkataramana
- 2019 – K. B. Sinha
- 2022 - Sudesh K. Khanduja

== See also ==
- List of mathematics awards
