= Tandarai =

- panchayat town
- Location in Tamil Nadu, India Tandarai (India)
- Coordinates: 12.1°N 79.20°E
- Country: India
- State: Tamil Nadu
- District: Tiruvanamalai
- Elevation: 81 m (266 ft)

Population (2001)
  - Total: 5,201

Languages
  - Official: Tamil
- Time zone: UTC+5:30 (IST)

Tandarai is a Panchayat town in Tiruvanamalai district, Tamil Nadu India. It is the fourth largest town in Kilpennathur taluk and has one railway station. It lies between Vettavalam and Veraiyur and has a population of 5201 and altitude of 81m.
