= K. Ananda Rau =

Indian mathematician (1893–1966)

Ananda Rau
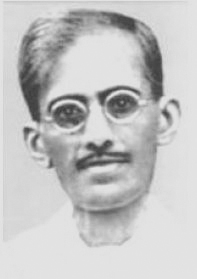
- Born: 21 September 1893; Madras, British India
- Died: 22 January 1966 (aged 72); Bombay, India
- Education: Presidency College, Madras
- Known for: summability of series, theory of functions of a complex variable and sums of an even number of squares
- Scientific career
- Fields: Mathematics
- Workplaces: Presidency College, Madras
- Doctoral advisor: Godfrey Harold Hardy

K. Ananda Rau (21 September 1893 – 22 January 1966) was an eminent Indian mathematician and a contemporary of Ramanujan. Though Rau was six years junior to Ramanujan, his mathematical trajectory, unlike Ramanujan's, was very much a conventional one and he had decided to pursue a career in mathematics well before Ramanujan's prowess became known.

== Biography ==
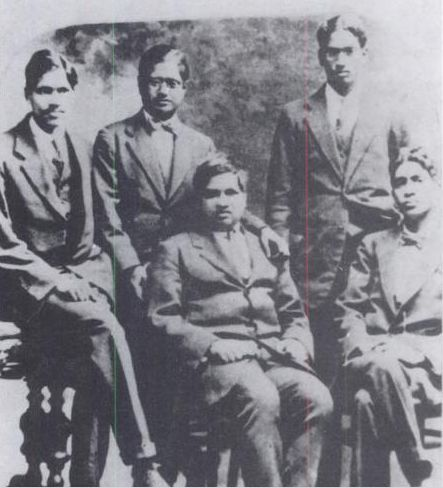
Ananda Rau is seated on the high stool at the far left along with Ramanujan in the front chair

Ananda Rau was born in Madras on 21 September 1893. He attended the Hindu School in Triplicane, Madras and then Presidency College of the University of Madras. After a brilliant academic record, he sailed to England in 1914 only a few months after Ramanujan. After finishing his Mathematical Tripos from King's College, Cambridge, in 1916, he, like Ramanujan, came under the influence of G. H. Hardy, who guided and initiated him into active research. At Cambridge, Rau and Ramanujan became good friends. Moreover, Ramanujan's "most devoted friend" R. Ramachandra Rao, who was a District Collector, was Ananda Rau's relative. Ramachandra Rao, was responsible for mentoring Ramanujan on seeing his prowess in research, and provided financial aid, took care of his daily needs and got him a clerk's job at the Madras Port Trust. Though Ananda Rau met Ramanujan for the first time in England, he would have come to know of Ramanjuan through his relationship with Rao.

Ananda Rau returned to India in 1919 and was appointed as a professor of mathematics at Presidency College at the age of 26. Later, he served also as the Principal of the college and retired in 1948. His life was not without tragedy, as his wife died at a young age in 1928 and a daughter in 1940. He himself had various disabilities, including blindness in one eye, in his later years. He died on 22 January 1966, at the age of 72.

== Academic work ==
As a student, Rau wrote an essay under Hardy's guidance that fetched him the coveted Smith Prize in 1917, following which he was also elected a fellow of King's College. Along with Hardy, Rau did a considerable amount of work on "Summability" and convergence properties of infinite series. In fact, a theorem named after Rau figures in Hardy's book. Rau published several papers, primarily in three fields: summability of series, theory of functions of a complex variable and sums of an even number of squares. Among the first papers he wrote after his return was on the subject of the Riemann zeta function, and the technique devised by Rau was found to have wide applicability in other problems of number theory.

== Teaching influence ==
Ananda Rau taught several well-known mathematicians, including Subrahmanyan Chandrasekhar, K. S. Chandrasekharan, S Minakshisundaram, C T Rajagopal, C S Venkitaraman and M V Subbarao. His students regarded him as an inspiring teacher who emphasized that mathematics is an activity requiring immersion and dedication and is not for spectators. The story of Indian mathematics beyond Ramanujan begins with Rau and it is essentially Rau's students and descendants who constituted the Indian school of number theory.
