= Ram Prakash Bambah =

Indian mathematician (1925–2025)

Ram Prakash Bambah (17 September 1925 – 26 May 2025) was an Indian mathematician working in number theory and discrete geometry.

== Life and career ==
Bambah was born on 17 September 1925. He earned a bachelor's degree from Government College University, Lahore, and a master's degree from the University of the Punjab, Lahore. He then went to England for his doctoral studies, earning his Ph.D. in 1950 from St John's College, Cambridge under the supervision of Louis J. Mordell. Returning to India, he became a reader at Panjab University, Chandigarh, in 1952, and was promoted to professor there in 1957. Maintaining his position at Panjab University, he also held a position as professor at Ohio State University in the US from 1964 to 1969. He retired from Panjab University in 1993.

He was married to Saudamini, whose father was the well known Indian botanist Prana Krushna Parija. Their daughter Bindu Bambah is a well-known Theoretical Physicist.

He was president of the Indian Mathematical Society in 1969, and vice chancellor of Panjab University from 1985 to 1991.

Bambah died on 26 May 2025, at the age of 99.

== Awards and honours ==
Bambah was elected to the Indian National Science Academy in 1955. In 1979 he was awarded the Srinivasa Ramanujan Medal, and in 1974 was elected to the Indian Academy of Sciences. In 1988 he received the Aryabhata Medal of the Indian National Science Academy and the Padma Bhushan award.
