= Six exponentials theorem =

Condition on transcendence of numbers

In mathematics, specifically transcendental number theory, the six exponentials theorem is a result that, given the right conditions on the exponents, guarantees the transcendence of at least one of a set of six exponentials.

== Statement ==
If $x_1, x_2, x_3$ are three complex numbers that are linearly independent over the rational numbers, and $y_1, y_2$ are two complex numbers that are also linearly independent over the rational numbers, then at least one of the following numbers is transcendental:

$e^{x_1y_1}, e^{x_1y_2}, e^{x_2y_1}, e^{x_2y_2}, e^{x_3y_1}, e^{x_3y_2}.$

The theorem can be stated in terms of logarithms by introducing the set L of logarithms of algebraic numbers:

$$\mathcal{L}=\{\lambda\in\mathbb{C}\,:\,e^\lambda\in\overline{\mathbb{Q}}\}.$$

The theorem then says that if $\lambda_{ij}$ are elements of L for $i = 1,2, j = 1,2,3$ such that $\lambda_{11}, \lambda_{12}, \lambda_{13}$ are linearly independent over the rational numbers, and λ_{11} and λ_{21} are also linearly independent over the rational numbers, then the matrix

$$M=\begin{pmatrix}\lambda_{11}&\lambda_{12}&\lambda_{13} \\ \lambda_{21}&\lambda_{22}&\lambda_{23}\end{pmatrix}$$

has rank 2.

== History ==
A special case of the result where x_{1}, x_{2}, and x_{3} are logarithms of positive integers, y_{1} = 1, and y_{2} is real, was first mentioned in a paper by Leonidas Alaoglu and Paul Erdős from 1944 in which they try to prove that the ratio of consecutive colossally abundant numbers is always prime. They claimed that Carl Ludwig Siegel knew of a proof of this special case, but it is not recorded. Using the special case they manage to prove that the ratio of consecutive colossally abundant numbers is always either a prime or a semiprime.

The theorem was first explicitly stated and proved in its complete form independently by Serge Lang and Kanakanahalli Ramachandra in the 1960s.

== Five exponentials theorem ==
A stronger, related result is the five exponentials theorem, which is as follows. Let x_{1}, x_{2} and y_{1}, y_{2} be two pairs of complex numbers, with each pair being linearly independent over the rational numbers, and let γ be a non-zero algebraic number. Then at least one of the following five numbers is transcendental:

$$e^{x_1 y_1}, e^{x_1 y_2}, e^{x_2 y_1}, e^{x_2 y_2}, e^{\gamma x_2/x_1}.$$

This theorem implies the six exponentials theorem and in turn is implied by the as yet unproven four exponentials conjecture, which says that in fact one of the first four numbers on this list must be transcendental.

== Sharp six exponentials theorem ==
Another related result that implies both the six exponentials theorem and the five exponentials theorem is the sharp six exponentials theorem. This theorem is as follows. Let x_{1}, x_{2}, and x_{3} be complex numbers that are linearly independent over the rational numbers, and let y_{1} and y_{2} be a pair of complex numbers that are linearly independent over the rational numbers, and suppose that β_{ij} are six algebraic numbers for 1 ≤ i ≤ 3 and 1 ≤ j ≤ 2 such that the following six numbers are algebraic:

$$e^{x_1 y_1-\beta_{11}}, e^{x_1 y_2-\beta_{12}}, e^{x_2 y_1-\beta_{21}}, e^{x_2 y_2-\beta_{22}}, e^{x_3 y_1-\beta_{31}}, e^{x_3 y_2-\beta_{32}}.$$

Then x_{i} y_{j} = β_{ij} for 1 ≤ i ≤ 3 and 1 ≤ j ≤ 2. The six exponentials theorem then follows by setting β_{ij} = 0 for every i and j, while the five exponentials theorem follows by setting x_{3} = γ/x_{1} and using Baker's theorem to ensure that the x_{i} are linearly independent.

There is a sharp version of the five exponentials theorem as well, although it as yet unproven so is known as the sharp five exponentials conjecture. This conjecture implies both the sharp six exponentials theorem and the five exponentials theorem, and is stated as follows. Let x_{1}, x_{2} and y_{1}, y_{2} be two pairs of complex numbers, with each pair being linearly independent over the rational numbers, and let α, β_{11}, β_{12}, β_{21}, β_{22}, and γ be six algebraic numbers with γ ≠ 0 such that the following five numbers are algebraic:

$$e^{x_1 y_1-\beta_{11}}, e^{x_1 y_2-\beta_{12}}, e^{x_2 y_1-\beta_{21}}, e^{x_2 y_2-\beta_{22}}, e^{(\gamma x_2/x_1)-\alpha}.$$

Then x_{i} y_{j} = β_{ij} for 1 ≤ i, j ≤ 2 and γx_{2} = αx_{1}.

A consequence of this conjecture that isn't currently known would be the transcendence of e^{π²}, by setting x_{1} = y_{1} = β_{11} = 1, x_{2} = y_{2} = iπ, and all the other values in the statement to be zero.

== Strong six exponentials theorem ==
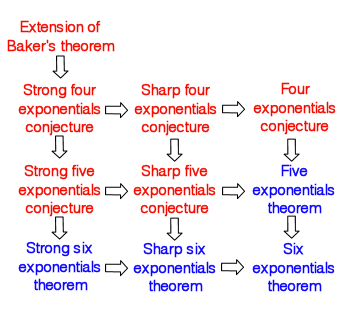
The logical implications between the various problems in this circle. Those in red are as yet unproven while those in blue are known results. The top most result refers to that discussed at Baker's theorem, while the four exponentials conjectures are detailed at the four exponentials conjecture article.

A further strengthening of the theorems and conjectures in this area are the strong versions. The strong six exponentials theorem is a result proved by Damien Roy that implies the sharp six exponentials theorem. This result concerns the vector space over the algebraic numbers generated by 1 and all logarithms of algebraic numbers, denoted here as L^{∗}. So L^{∗} is the set of all complex numbers of the form

$$\beta_0+\sum_{i=1}^n \beta_i\log\alpha_i,$$

for some n ≥ 0, where all the β_{i} and α_{i} are algebraic and every branch of the logarithm is considered. The strong six exponentials theorem then says that if x_{1}, x_{2}, and x_{3} are complex numbers that are linearly independent over the algebraic numbers, and if y_{1} and y_{2} are a pair of complex numbers that are also linearly independent over the algebraic numbers then at least one of the six numbers x_{i} y_{j} for 1 ≤ i ≤ 3 and 1 ≤ j ≤ 2 is not in L^{∗}. This is stronger than the standard six exponentials theorem which says that one of these six numbers is not simply the logarithm of an algebraic number.

There is also a strong five exponentials conjecture formulated by Michel Waldschmidt. It would imply both the strong six exponentials theorem and the sharp five exponentials conjecture. This conjecture claims that if x_{1}, x_{2} and y_{1}, y_{2} are two pairs of complex numbers, with each pair being linearly independent over the algebraic numbers, then at least one of the following five numbers is not in L^{∗}:

$$x_1y_1,\,x_1y_2,\,x_2y_1,\,x_2y_2,\,x_1/x_2.$$

All the above conjectures and theorems are consequences of the unproven extension of Baker's theorem, that logarithms of algebraic numbers that are linearly independent over the rational numbers are automatically algebraically independent too. The diagram on the right shows the logical implications between all these results.

== Generalization to commutative group varieties ==
The exponential function e^{z} uniformizes the exponential map of the multiplicative group G_{m}. Therefore, we can reformulate the six exponential theorem more abstractly as follows:

Let G = G_{m} × G_{m} and take u : C → G(C) to be a non-zero complex-analytic group homomorphism. Define L to be the set of complex numbers l for which u(l) is an algebraic point of G. If a minimal generating set of L over Q has more than two elements then the image u(C) is an algebraic subgroup of G(C).

(In order to derive the classical statement, set u(z) = (e^{y_{1}z}; e^{y_{2}z}) and note that Qx_{1} + Qx_{2} + Qx_{3} is a subset of L).

In this way, the statement of the six exponentials theorem can be generalized to an arbitrary commutative group variety G over the field of algebraic numbers. This generalized six exponential conjecture, however, seems out of scope at the current state of transcendental number theory.

For the special but interesting cases G = G_{m} × E and G = E × E′, where E, E′ are elliptic curves over the field of algebraic numbers, results towards the generalized six exponential conjecture were proven by Aleksander Momot. These results involve the exponential function e^{z} and a Weierstrass function $\wp$ resp. two Weierstrass functions $\wp, \wp'$ with algebraic invariants $g_2, g_3, g_2', g_3'$, instead of the two exponential functions $e^{y_1z}, e^{y_2z}$ in the classical statement.

Let G = G_{m} × E and suppose E is not isogenous to a curve over a real field and that u(C) is not an algebraic subgroup of G(C). Then L is generated over Q either by two elements x_{1}, x_{2}, or three elements x_{1}, x_{2}, x_{3} which are not all contained in a real line Rc, where c is a non-zero complex number. A similar result is shown for G = E × E′.
