= Ramanujam–Samuel theorem =

Conditions for a divisor of a local ring to be principal

In algebraic geometry, the Ramanujam–Samuel theorem gives conditions for a divisor of a local ring to be principal.

It was introduced independently by Samuel (1962) in answer to a question of Grothendieck and by C. P. Ramanujam in an appendix to a paper by Seshadri (1963), and was generalized by Grothendieck (1967, Theorem 21.14.1).

== Statement ==
Grothendieck's version of the Ramanujam–Samuel theorem (Grothendieck & Dieudonné 1967, theorem 21.14.1) is as follows. Suppose that A is a local Noetherian ring with maximal ideal m, whose completion is integral and integrally closed, and ρ is a local homomorphism from A to a local Noetherian ring B of larger dimension such that B is formally smooth over A and the residue field of B is finite over that of A. Then a cycle of codimension 1 in Spec(B) that is principal at the point mB is principal.
