= Cadambathur Tiruvenkatacharlu Rajagopal =

Indian mathematician

Cadambur Tiruvenkatachari Rajagopal (8 September 1903 – 25 April 1978) was an Indian mathematician.

== Biography ==
Rajagopal was born in Triplicane, Madras, India. He was the first son of Tiruvenkatachari and Padmammal. He had two younger brothers, C.T. Venugopal, a distinguished civil servant, and C. T. K. Chari. They also had a young sister, Kamala. He studied at Presidency College and graduated with an Honours in mathematics in 1925. He was involved in the clerical service and then taught mathematics at Annamalai University. Rajagopal taught mathematics at Madras Christian College from 1931 to 1951. He joined the Ramanujan Institute for Advanced Study in Mathematics in 1951.

Collaborating on the teaching of conic sections, Rajagopal and Vaniyambadi Rajagopala Srinivasaraghavan wrote a textbook, An Introduction to Analytical Conics, that was published in 1955 by Oxford University Press in India. A reviewer noted "a pleasing feature is the frequent reference to the history of the subject", and "the authors pursue the theory in great detail, proving a large number of subsidiary results."

Rajagopal became director of the Ramanujan Institute for Advanced Study in Mathematics in 1955. He helped the Institute to become India's leading mathematics research centre. The Institute is now associated with the University of Madras, after it was merged with the Department of Mathematics at the university in 1967.

Rajagopal conducted research on sequences, series, summability, and published more than 80 papers but is most noted for his work in the area of generalising and unifying Tauberian theorems. He also did research in many other mathematical topics.

Rajagopal also conducted research in the history of medieval Indian mathematics. He showed that the series for arctan x discovered by James Gregory and those for sin x and cos x discovered by Isaac Newton were known to the Hindu mathematicians 150 years earlier. He identified Madhava as the first discoverer of these series.

== Works ==
- 1949: (with M.S. Rangachari) "A Neglected Chapter of Hindu Mathematics", Scripta Mathematica 15: 201–9
- 1951: (with M.S. Rangachari) "On the Hindu proof of Gregory's series", Scripta Mathematica 17: 65–74.
- 1949: (with A. Venkataraman) "The sine and cosine power series in Hindu mathematics", Journal of the Royal Asiatic Society of Bengal (Science) 15: 1–13.
- 1955: (with V. R. Srinivasaraghavan) Introduction to Analytical Conics via Google Books
- 1977/8: (with M. S. Rangachari) "An Untapped Source of Medieval Keralese Mathematics", Archive for History of Exact Sciences 18(2): 89–102.
- 1986: (with M.S Rangachari) "On Medieval Kerala Mathematics" Archive for History of Exact Sciences 35: 91–99 doi:10.1007/BF00357622

== See also ==
- K. Ananda Rau
