= Kabru (supercomputer) =

Supercomputer at Chennai Institute of Technology, India

- Sponsors: Department of Atomic Energy, India
- Location: Institute of Mathematical Sciences, C.I.T Campus
- Architecture: Pentium 4 Xeon 2.4GHz, 288cores
- Operating system: Linux
- Speed: 1,002 GFlops
- Ranking: TOP500: 264, June 2004

Kabru is a supercomputer that uses a 2.4 GHz Pentium Xeon Cluster and Linux to provide a sustained speed of 959 gigaflops. It was developed by the Institute of Mathematical Sciences (IMSc) in Chennai, India. In June 2004, Kabru was listed as #264 in the TOP500 list of the world's most powerful computers. It takes its name from a Himalayan peak.

The idea for Kabru was born when Professor Hari Dass of the Institute began looking for a supercomputer to handle his theoretical physics research, which dealt primarily with large-scale simulations in the field of the lattice gauge theory.

The Department of Atomic Energy in India made a grant of Rs 3.5 crore to the Institute to develop Kabru.
