= C. S. Yogananda =

Indian mathematician

C S Yogananda
- Born: 28 August 1960 (age 66); Tumkur, Karnataka, India
- Education: Institute of Mathematical Sciences, Chennai
- Known for: Number theory Elliptic Curves; Modular Forms
- Scientific career
- Fields: Mathematics
- Workplaces: Sriranga Digital Software Technologies
- Thesis: Dirichlet series associated to Modular forms (1990)
- Doctoral advisor: Ramachandran Balasubramanian

C. S. Yogananda is a mathematician and Professor of Mathematics at the J.S.S Science and Technology University in Mysore, India. He is the founder of Sriranga Digital Software Technologies and author who has published several writings on mathematics.

== Education ==
Yogananda received his Ph.D. from the Institute of Mathematical Sciences, Chennai under advisor Ramachandran Balasubramanian.

== Mathematical Olympiads ==
Yogananda has been involved with the Mathematical Olympiad movement in India since 1989. He has participated as a resource person and evaluated answer books for various regional (RMO) and national (INMO) Olympiads. He was also an academic coordinator for the Problem Coordinators workshops organized by the National Board for Higher Mathematics. He was a member of the Core Faculty at the International Mathematical Olympiad (IMO)Training Camps and was also involved in the selection of the Indian Team since 1989. Yogananda was a member of the Organizing Committee (Computer Committee/Publications Committee/Problem Selection Committee) when India hosted the IMO in July 1996 in Mumbai. Yogananda was an Observer and Deputy Leader for the Indian team participating in the IMO in the years 1993, 1995, and 1998. During this time, India won 3 Gold, 10 Silver and 4 Bronze medals in total.

== Sriranga Digital Software Technologies ==
Yogananda established Sriranga Digital Software Technologies in 2003, with the primary intention of bringing digital technologies to the service of Indian languages.

== Advaita Sharada ==
Yogananda also created a digital archive of Sri Shankaracharya's works. The Advaita Sharada initiative has been recognized by the Jagadgurus of Sri Sringeri Sharada Peetham. The archive is a collection of Prasthanatraya Bhashya of Sri Shankara, his prakarana granthas and also the commentaries by later commentators of Sri Shankara. The archive can help in understanding the works of Sri Shankara in more depth since it allows a complete search of the texts.

== Honorary positions ==
- Honorary Secretary, Leelavati Trust (Regd.), Bangalore.
- Honorary Joint Director, Jawaharlal Nehru Planetarium, Bangalore from November 1, 2000, to October 31, 2003.
- Member Secretary, Steering Committee for Informatics Olympiad.
- Chairman, TeX Users Group India (TUGIndia).
