= Rajiah Simon =

Indian physicist

Rajiah Simon is a professor of physics at the Institute of Mathematical Sciences, Chennai, India.

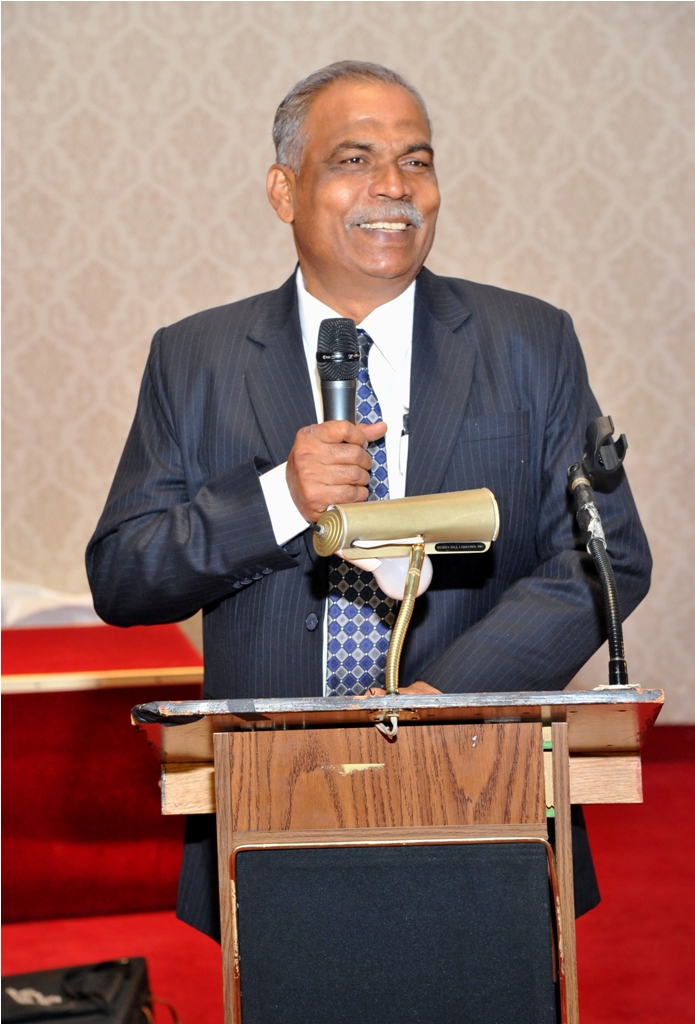
Talk in 2012

Simon received the Shanti Swarup Bhatnagar Prize for Science and Technology in 1993 for pioneering work in quantum optics.

Simon and collaborators initiated the quantum theory of charged-particle beam optics by working out the focusing action of a magnetic quadrupole using the Dirac equation.
