= Kalyan Bidhan Sinha =

Indian mathematician

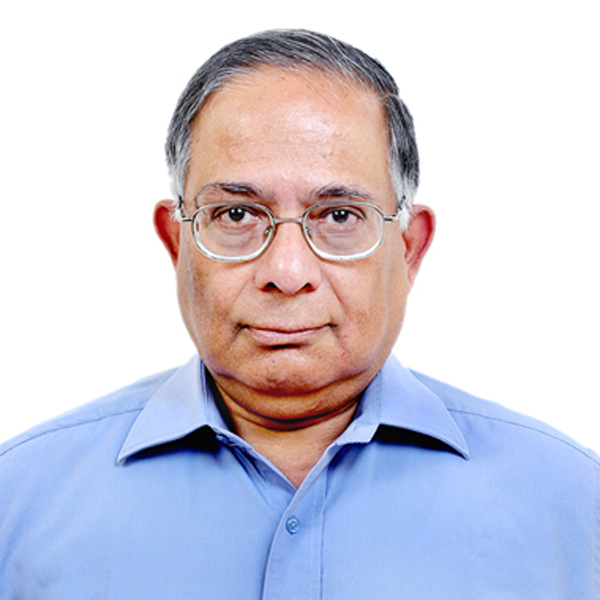
- Born: 3 June 1944 (age 82)
- Citizenship: Indian
- Education: Presidency College (BSc); Delhi University (MSc); University of Rochester (PhD)
- Known for: Non-Commutative Geometry, Spectral Theory of Operators, Stochastic Processes
- Spouse: Akhila Sinha
- Children: 2
- Awards: Shanti Swarup Bhatnagar Prize for Science and Technology
- Scientific career
- Workplaces: Indian Statistical Institute, Kolkata, Jawaharlal Nehru Centre for Advanced Scientific Research, Bangalore
- Doctoral advisor: Gérard G. Emch

Kalyan Bidhan Sinha (born 3 June 1944) also known as K.B. Sinha is an Indian mathematician. He is a professor at the Jawaharlal Nehru Centre for Advanced Scientific Research, and Professor Emeritus for life of the Indian Statistical Institute.

Sinha is the author of numerous scientific works in scattering theory, spectral theory of Schrödinger operators, quantum stochastic calculus, noncommutative geometry, and, more broadly, in mathematical physics.

== Education and career ==
Kalyan Bidhan Sinha graduated from Hindu School, Calcutta in 1960. He studied Physics at Presidency College, Calcutta, obtaining his Bachelor's degree from the University of Calcutta in 1963, and then studied at the University of Delhi where he was awarded a Master's degree in 1965. He obtained his Ph.D. in Physics from the University of Rochester in 1969.

Sinha was a post-doctoral research associate at the University of Geneva. During this time he co-authored, with Werner Amrein and Josef-Maria Jauch, a well-known book on scattering theory, which used mathematically rigorous methods to develop the subject.

Sinha served on the faculty of the Indian Statistical Institute from 1978 to 2005, serving as Director of the institute from 2000 to 2005. He has held numerous visiting faculty positions, at RIMS (Kyoto University), University of Texas, Austin, University of Geneva, among many other institutions. He was Ulam Visiting Chair Professor at the University of Colorado, Boulder in 1980. He is currently Honorary Professor, Jawaharlal Nehru Centre for Advanced Scientific Research, Bangalore. He is also Distinguished Associate of Institute Mathematics Initiative, Indian Institute of Science, and Professor Emeritus, Indian Statistical Institute.

Sinha is President of the Association for Quantum Probability and Infinite Dimensional Analysis (since 2013). He has served on numerous editorial boards, including those of Infinite Dimensional Analysis, Quantum Probability, and Related Topics, Reviews in Mathematical Physics, and the Journal of Stochastic Analysis.

== Honors ==
In 2019 Sinha was awarded the Srinivasa Ramanujan Medal of the Indian National Science Academy. He received the Shanti Swarup Bhatnagar Prize for Science and Technology, the highest science award in India, in the mathematical sciences category in 1988. In 2004 Sinha was awarded the P.C. Mahalanobis Medal by the Indian Science Congress. Sinha was elected Fellow of the TWAS in 2002. He was named Professor Emeritus for Life of the Indian Statistical Institute in 2012.

== Selected publications ==
- Amrein, Werner O.; Jauch, Josef M.; Sinha, Kalyan B. Scattering theory in quantum mechanics. Physical principles and mathematical methods. Lecture Notes and Supplements in Physics, No. 16. W. A. Benjamin, Inc., Reading, Mass.-London-Amsterdam, 1977.
- Amrein, W. O.; Sinha, Kalyan B. On pairs of projections in a Hilbert space. Linear Algebra Appl. 208/209 (1994), 425–435.
- Goswami, Debashish; Sinha, Kalyan B. Hilbert modules and stochastic dilation of a quantum dynamical semigroup on a von Neumann algebra. Comm. Math. Phys. 205 (1999), no. 2, 377–403.
- Sinha, Kalyan B.; Goswami, Debashish Quantum stochastic processes and noncommutative geometry.
- Parthasarathy, K. R.; Sinha, K. B. Stochastic integral representation of bounded quantum martingales in Fock space. J. Funct. Anal. 67 (1986), no. 1, 126–151.
- Lindsay, J. Martin; Sinha, Kalyan B. Feynman-Kac representation of some noncommutative elliptic operators. J. Funct. Anal. 147 (1997), no. 2, 400–419.
