= T. R. Ramadas =

Indian mathematician

T.R. Ramadas
- Born: Trivandrum Ramakrishnan Ramadas; 30 March 1955 (age 71)
- Citizenship: Indian
- Education: University of Bombay; IIT Kanpur
- Awards: Shanti Swarup Bhatnagar Prize for Science and Technology
- Scientific career
- Fields: Algebraic and differential geometry, mathematical physics
- Workplaces: International Centre for Theoretical Physics; Chennai Mathematical Institute
- Doctoral advisor: M S Narasimhan

Trivandrum Ramakrishnan "T. R." Ramadas (born 30 March 1955) is an Indian mathematician who specializes in algebraic and differential geometry, and mathematical physics. He was awarded the Shanti Swarup Bhatnagar Prize for Science and Technology in 1998, the highest science award in India, in the mathematical sciences category.

He studied engineering in IIT Kanpur then joined TIFR as a graduate student in physics finally changing to mathematics after his interactions with M S Narasimhan.

He is currently a professor at Chennai Mathematical Institute, Chennai, Tamil Nadu.

== Selected publications ==
- "The "Harder-Narasimhan Trace" and Unitarity of the KZ/Hitchin Connection: genus 0", Ann. of Math. 169, 1–39 (2009).
- (With V.B. Mehta) "Moduli of vector bundles, Frobenius splitting, and invariant theory", Ann. of Math. 144, 269–313 (1996).
- "Factorisation of generalised theta functions II", Topology 35, 641–654 (1996).
- (With M.S. Narasimhan) "Factorisation of generalised theta functions I", Invent. Math. 114, 565–624 (1993).
- (With I.M. Singer and J. Weitsman) "Some comments on Chern Simons gauge theory", Commun. Math. Phys. 126, 409–420 (1989).
- (With P.K. Mitter) "The two-dimensional O(N) nonlinear =E5 model: renormalisation and effective actions", Commun. Math. Phys. 122, 575–596 (1989).
- (With M.S. Narasimhan) "Geometry of SU(2) gauge fields", Commun. Math. Phys. 67, 121–136 (1979).
