= Ramanujan Institute for Advanced Study in Mathematics =

Indian research department

Coordinates: 13.0646°N 80.2801°E

- Established: 1927 as Department of Mathematics, University of Madras; 1967 as RIASM
- Research type: Public
- Field of research: Mathematics
- Director: Prof M. Pitchaimani
- Location: Chepauk, Chennai, India
- Campus: Urban
- Affiliations: University of Madras
- Operating agency: NBHM, UGC
- Website: riasm.unom.ac.in

Ramanujan Institute for Advanced Study in Mathematics (RIASM) is the Department of Mathematics of University of Madras. This name was adopted in 1967.

== History ==
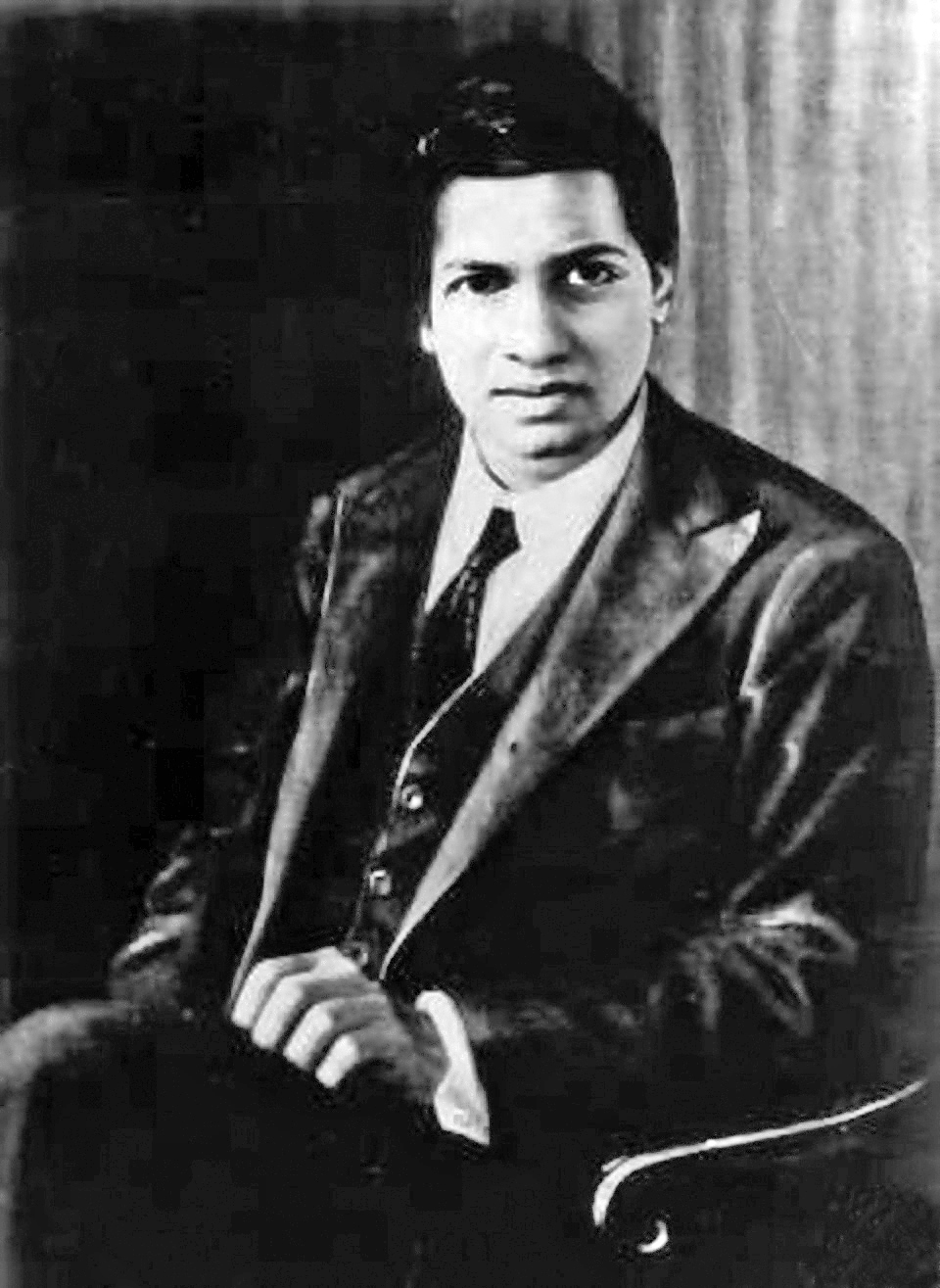
Srinivasa Ramanujan (1887-1920)

The University of Madras was incorporated in 1857 and the Department of Mathematics was an integral part of the university from its beginning. The department developed from its early years to become a centre of research in mathematics with the appointment of R. Vaidyanathaswamy as a Reader in Mathematics in 1927.

The seeds of the Ramanujan Institute for Advanced Study in Mathematics were sown when the "Ramanujan Institute of Mathematics" was established by Alagappa Chettiar on 26 January 1950 as a memorial to the mathematician Srinivasa Ramanujan. It was governed by the Asoka Charitable Trust, Karaikudi, and was located at Krishna Vilas, Vepery, Chennai. The Ramanujan Institute of Mathematics was inaugurated by A. Lakshmanaswamy Mudaliar, Vice Chancellor of University of Madras, with T. Vijayaraghavan, a student of G.H. Hardy, as Director of the Institute. The institute faced a financial crisis when, in 1956, Asoka Charitable Trust expressed its inability to run the institute. However, due to the request from Subrahmanyan Chandrasekhar Jawaharlal Nehru took an initiative in such a way the management of the institute came to be vested with the University of Madras and the institute was taken over by the university in May 1957.

The Asoka charitable Trust Started Ramanujan Institute of Mathematics in January, 1950 and as the Institute found itself in financial difficulties, Government of India agreed in 1953-54 to meet the expenses of a chair for Mathematics at the Institute Object to the condition that the Trust Would continue to spend the amount Previously spent by it for the activity of the Institute. Grants of 18,000 for each year were given the Institute for the years 1953-54 and 1994-55, but the audited accounts of the Institute revealed that the Trust was not fulfilling the condition of the Government grant and had instead built up a Reserve Fund. No Government grant was therefore paid in 1965-56 Towards the close of 1956, the Trust decided to close down the Institute, but as a result of discussions with the Government of India, Initiated by the founder of the Trust and the Vice-Chancellor of the Madras University, and later earned on by the Vice-Chancellor, it has been agreed that in view of the difficulty of manning an Institute with the limited number of available Professors of the requisite quality, the activities of the Institute may be continued in the Department of Mathematics in the University of Madras It has been decided to create a Ramanujam Professorship of Mathematics on a scale of Rs 1,000—1,500 with selection grade up to Rs 1,700 and attach the existing permanent research staff of the Institute to the said Professor The Government of India will give the necessary grants to the University to enable them to carry out this arrangement until such time as the University Grants Commission sanctions an appropriate grant. During the short period of existence, the institute had a string of prominent mathematicians as visitors, including S.S. Pillai, noted number theorist, V. Ganapathy Iyer, analyst and Norbert Wiener. After the demise of T. Vijayaraghavan in 1955, C.T. Rajagopal took over as the Director of the Institute.

From 1957 to 1966, the Department of Mathematics and the Ramanujan Institute of Mathematics functioned as independent bodies under the University of Madras.

In 1967 the University Grants Commission (India) proposed to make the Department of Mathematics of the University of Madras into one of its Centres of Advanced Study. In the same year these two institutions were amalgamated to form a UGC Centre for Advanced Study in Mathematics and named the center as the "Ramanujan Institute for Advanced Study in Mathematics" (RIASM).

C.T. Rajagopal was appointed the first Director of the Ramanujan Institute for Advanced Study in Mathematics, and when he retired in 1969, the reins were taken over by T.S. Bhanumurthy.

== Ramanujan Museum ==
Utilising a grant of Rs. 1 lakh received as UGC Special Assistance for Equipment and with the help of the Vikram A. Sarabhai Community Science Centre, Ahmedabad a Mathematical Laboratory was established in the institute. About 65 mathematical models were acquired under the scheme. These models were exhibited

- for the participants of several Refresher Courses conducted through the Academic Staff College of the University of Madras,
- at the Silver Jubilee conference of the Association of Mathematics Teachers of India held at Madras during 10–13 January 1991,
- in the Science Exhibition held at National Institute of Technology, Tiruchirapalli during 10–14 July 1991, and
- are being lent to be exhibited in several schools in and around Chennai.

Later the institute received an amount of Rs. 2 lakh from the National Board for Higher Mathematics, Rs. 1 lakh from The Hindu newspaper and Rs. 9 lakh from the Ministry of Culture and Tourism, Government of India, and a matching grant of Rs. 9 lakh from the University of Madras. The amount was used to establish the Ramanujan Museum in the premises of the Ramanujan Institute for Advanced Study in Mathematics. A grant of rupees one crore was later sanctioned by the Ministry of Human Resource Development, Government of India, towards the establishment of Ramanujan Museum and Research Centre.

== Courses offered ==
- M.Sc. (Mathematics) full-time
- MPhil (Mathematics) full-time
- PhD (Mathematics) full-time and part-time

== Current research areas ==
- Algebra
- Functional analysis
- Harmonic analysis
- Potential theory
- Differential equations
- Mathematical biology
- Stochastic processes
- Graph theory
