= K. G. Ramanathan =

Indian mathematician

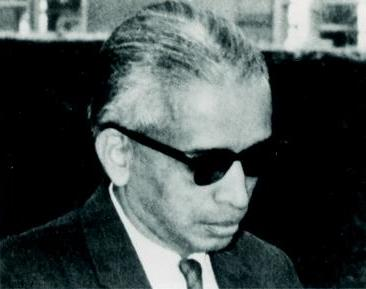
- Born: 13 November 1920; Hyderabad, British India
- Died: 10 May 1992 (aged 71); Bombay, India
- Citizenship: Indian
- Education: Princeton University
- Occupation: Mathematician
- Spouse: Jayalakshmi Ramanathan
- Awards: Padma Bhushan
- Scientific career
- Fields: Number theory
- Workplaces: TIFR
- Doctoral advisor: Emil Artin
- Doctoral students: C. P. Ramanujam; Kanakanahalli Ramachandra

Kollagunta Gopalaiyer Ramanathan (13 November 1920 – 10 May 1992) was an Indian mathematician known for his work in number theory. His contributions are also to the general development of mathematical research, and teaching in India.

== K. G. Ramanathan's early life and his family ==
K. G. Ramanathan was born in Hyderabad, South India, on 13 November 1920 to Sri Kollagunta Gopal Iyer and Smt. Anantalakshmi, and was one of three children in the family.

Ramanathan received his early education from Wesleyan Mission High School in Secunderabad. He further pursued his academic interests in mathematics and obtained a BA degree from Nizam College, Hyderabad, in 1940. Later, in 1942, he completed his master's degree in mathematics from Loyola College in Chennai (then known as Madras). Sources state that Ramanathan's academic journey was also influenced by mathematics teacher and Jesuit priest, Rev Fr. C Racine, who was a former student of the renowned French mathematician E Cartan.

With a keen passion for teaching and research in mathematics, Ramanathan worked as an assistant lecturer at Annamalai University in Chidambaram, Tamil Nadu from 1945 to 1946. He then joined Osmania University, Hyderabad as a lecturer for the following two years. In 1948, he became a research scholar at the University of Madras, where he had the opportunity to work alongside esteemed mathematicians including Professors R Vaidhyanathaswamy and T Vijayraghavan. In the same year, Ramanathan received an invitation to attend the Institute for Advanced Study (IAS) at Princeton. Whilst there, Ramanathan worked alongside Hermann Weyl and Carl Siegel, and is said to have sung Carnatic songs of Tyagaraja to the legendary physicist Albert Einstein, who was Ramanathan's neighbour at the university. Until 1951, along with Emil Artin, Siegel supervised Ramanathan in his PhD studies in mathematics.

Following the successful completion of his PhD, Ramanathan returned to India to team up with K. S. Chandrasekharan at the Tata Institute of Fundamental Research (TIFR) at Colaba in 1951.

Ramanathan was married to Jayalakshmi Ramanathan. He had two sons. His mother died at an early age.

== Career ==
At TIFR, he built up the number theory group of young mathematicians from India. For several years, he took interest to study Ramanujan's unpublished and published work. He was an editorial board member of Acta Arithmetica for over 30 years. He retired from TIFR in 1985.

=== Awards ===
Ramanathan was given numerous achievements during his more than 30 years service at TIFR.

- Padma Bhushan, 1983
- Shanti Swarup Bhatnagar Award, 1965
- Fellow of Indian Academy of Sciences
- Fellow of Indian National Science Academy
- Honorary fellow of TIFR.

=== Selected publications ===
- On Ramanujan's continued fraction, KG Ramanathan – Acta Arith, 1984
- Some applications of Kronecker’s limit formula, KG Ramanathan – J. Indian Math. Soc, 1987
