= Ramanujan Srinivasan =

Indian physicist (1938–1984)

- Born: 21 April 1938; India
- Died: 10 September 1984 (aged 46)
- Known for: Studies on magnetic resonance phenomena
- Awards: 1981 Shanti Swarup Bhatnagar Prize
- Scientific career
- Fields: Solid state physics

Ramanujan Srinivasan (1938–1984) was an Indian physicist, known for his research on magnetic resonance phenomena. Using new techniques developed for the purpose, he studied ferroelectricity which established the significance of hydrogen atoms and ammonium ions in the system. His studies have been documented by way of a number of articles and the article repository of the Indian Academy of Sciences has listed 40 of them. He was a fellow of the Indian Academy of Sciences. The Council of Scientific and Industrial Research, the apex agency of the Government of India for scientific research, awarded him the Shanti Swarup Bhatnagar Prize for Science and Technology, one of the highest Indian science awards, for his contributions to Physical Sciences in 1981. (Note: Long link - please select award year to see details) Srinivasan died on 10 September 1984, at the age of 46.

== See also ==
- Ramanujan (disambiguation)
