= C. T. K. Chari =

Indian professor

C.T.K.Chari
- Born: 5 June 1909; Tiruvellore, India
- Died: 5 January 1993 (aged 83); Tambaram, India
- Occupation: Professor of Philosophy
- Spouse: Mythili Lakshminarasimha Iyengar
- Children: Nirmala Ramanujan
- Parent(s): Tiruvenkatachari and Padmammal

C. T. Krishnamachari (5 June 1909 – 5 January 1993) was Head of the Department of Philosophy at Madras Christian College from 1958 to 1969 and the most prominent among contemporary Indian philosophers who paid close attention to psi phenomena. Chari published extensively on extremely diverse topics, such as logic, linguistics, information theory, mathematics, quantum physics, philosophy of mind, and, of course, psi research.

== Early life ==
Cadambur Tiruvenkatachari Krishnamachari (CTK) was born on 5 June 1909 in Tiruvellore, South India. He was the third son of Tiruvenkatachari and Padmammal. He had two older brothers - C.T.Rajagopal, a noted mathematician, and C.T.Venugopal. They had a young sister - Kamala. They were grand nephews and niece of the illustrious brothers - Sir.P.Rajagopalachari KCSI, CIE and P.Narasimhachari - Justice in High Court of Burma (Myanmar).

CTK and his family lived in Triplicane (Chennai) on Big Street and all of them studied in Hindu Higher secondary school. He did his intermediate in Presidency College, Chennai. Following the two years in the intermediate college, he got his BA (Honors) from Madras Christian College (MCC) and distinguished himself by also winning the Samuel Sathyanathan Gold medal for Philosophy. He then became a tutor and lecturer at American College, Madurai. In 1940, he joined MCC as an assistant professor.

== Career ==
CTK was contributing scholarly articles to scientific magazines and journals even before he got his doctorate or before becoming a professor at MCC. His first paper – ‘An Epistemological approach to the special theory of relativity' was published by Mind in April 1937. Towards the end of 1952 he started to work on his doctoral thesis - 'On some spatial representations of time and their significance for problem of precognition'. His supervisor was Professor Parthasarathy (Major) and in 1953, his thesis was sent to a board of three judges that included Sir Karl Popper at University of London. He was awarded his PhD with top honors, something that was widely expected. At the same time the university allowed him to convert his BA (Honors) degree to be an MA degree.

By 1958, he was appointed the Head of the Department of Philosophy. From then to his retirement in 1969, he and his family lived at Staff Bungalow 15 (behind Bishop Heber Hall) on the Madras Christian College Campus at Tambaram. He also was the acting head of the department of Philosophy until 1971. Following his retirement, he continued as a (University Grants Commission) professor until 1976. The family moved outside the college campus to a house which they called 'The Cloister' where CTK and Mythili lived out the remainder of their lives.

== Contemporaries ==
In 1955, Gardner Murphy visited Dr. Chari at the request of Eileen Garrett - a medium and one of the founding members of the Parapsychology Foundation, after which Dr. Chari became a regular contributor to various parapsychological magazines.

== Interests ==
He wrote much about philosophy of science, social impact of the philosophy, metaphysics, psychology, parapsychology, cognitive sciences and quantum mechanics. Apart from written articles for various journals, he also had his speeches broadcast on radio occasionally, of which 'Philosophy of Bertrand Russell' - is the only documented one as it was later published by All India Radio.

=== Reincarnation and astrology ===
He had a long and engaged battle of wits with Ian Stevenson who studied reincarnation across South East Asia and published a lot of cases favoring the phenomenon. CTK was skeptical, and questioned Dr. Stevenson's research in the Journal for American Society of Psychical Research. He similarly discussed the research and views of Dr. B. V. Raman, who was the founder of the Indian Astrological magazine.

== Later years ==
In the 1980s, he slowly wound down his research activities, though his correspondence with various scholars continued to the very end. His last contribution was a paper titled 'Paranormal Religious Thanthology' to Christian Parapsychologist in March 1992. Mythili died in Jan 1992 and CTK died within a year in Jan 1993.

== Publications ==
By C. T. K. Chari
- Introduction to the book titled ‘From India to the Planet Mars: a Study of a Case of Somnambulism’ by Flournoy, Theodore with Glossolalia; University Books; New Edition (1963)

- A detailed list of scientific papers published is to be found here

On C. T. K. Chari
- Great Thinkers on Great Questions by Varghese, Roy Abraham (ISBN 1851681442, ISBN 978-1-85168-144-0)
