= Alladi Ramakrishnan =

Indian physicist (1923–2008)

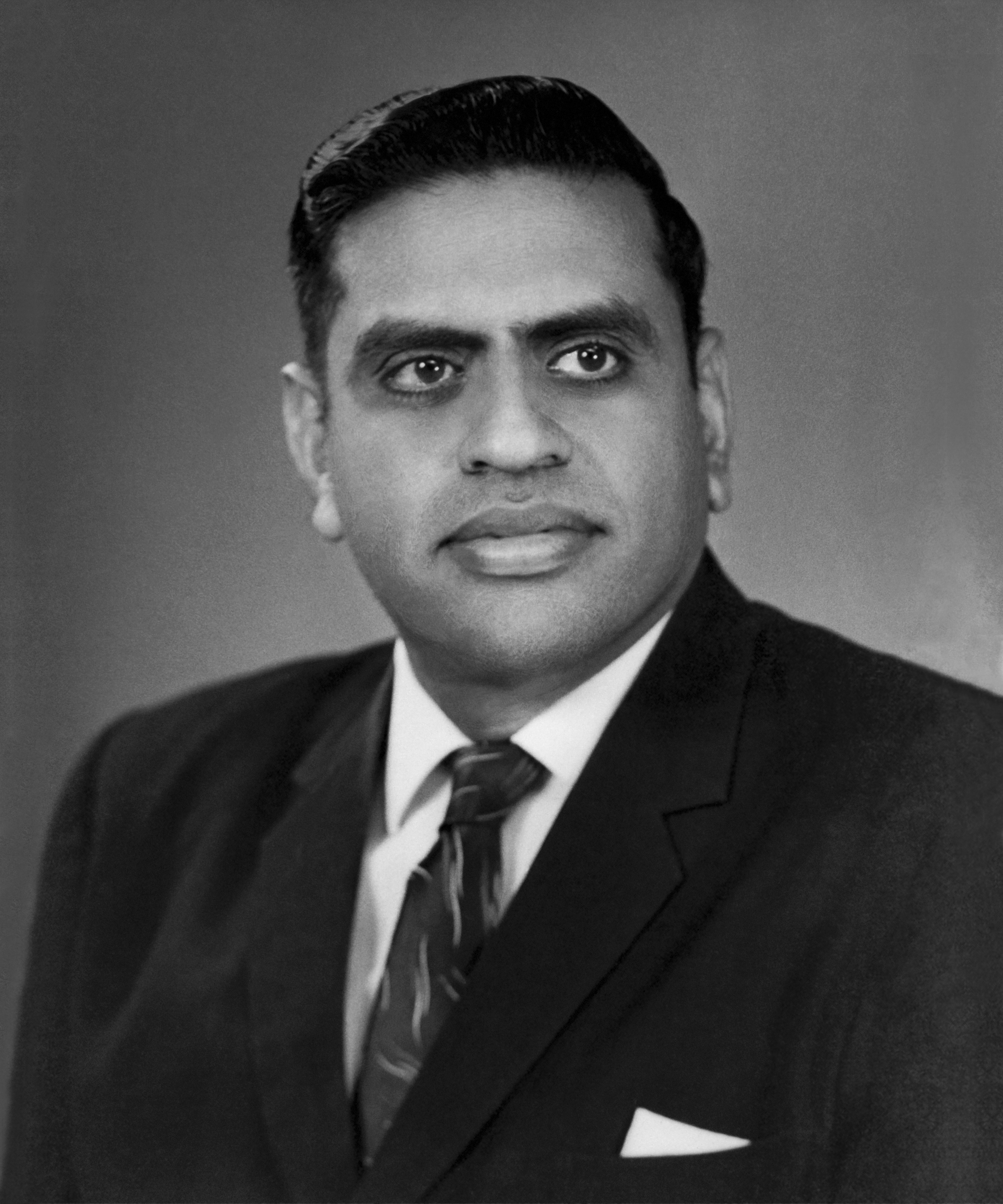
- Born: 9 August 1923; Madras, Madras Presidency, India
- Died: 7 June 2008 (aged 85); Gainesville, Florida, U.S.
- Education: University of Madras, Tata Institute of Fundamental Research, University of Manchester
- Known for: Contributions to stochastic process, particle physics, special relativity L-matrix theory
- Scientific career
- Fields: Theoretical physics, statistics
- Workplaces: University of Madras, Institute of Mathematical Sciences
- Doctoral advisor: M. S. Bartlett
- Doctoral students: A. P. Balachandran

Alladi Ramakrishnan (9 August 1923 – 7 June 2008) was an Indian physicist and the founder of the Institute of Mathematical Sciences (IMSc) in Chennai. He made contributions to stochastic process, particle physics, algebra of matrices, special theory of relativity and quantum mechanics.

== Early life ==
Ramakrishnan was born on 9 August 1923 in Madras. His father was the lawyer Sir Alladi Krishnaswami Iyer, who, as a member of the Constituent Assembly, was instrumental in drafting the Constitution of India with other prominent members. He had his early education in P. S. High School, Madras. He graduated from Presidency College, Madras, with B.Sc. (Hons) degree in physics. As a student of the college he had wanted to work under Sir C. V. Raman. When his father consulted Raman, Raman suggested reading Lehrbuch der theoretischen Physik by Georg Joos. Ramakrishnan studied the book and developed an interest in theoretical physics and special relativity in particular.

== Career ==
After completing his studies at Presidency College, Ramakrishnan started working with Homi Bhabha at the Tata Institute of Fundamental Research (TIFR). At TIFR, Bhabha introduced him to Cascade Theory and Fluctuation Problem of Cosmic Radiation. In August 1949, he left for England to work under M. S. Bartlett at the University of Manchester. Ramakrishnan's work on Product Densities that he did while at TIFR was good enough work for a PhD. But he stayed in Manchester for two more years to complete his residency requirements. His work on Product Densities appeared in the Proceedings of the Cambridge Philosophical Society.

During the 1950s, he worked on the problem of Fluctuating Density Field, and published a series of eight papers on the subject. During 1957–1958 Ramakrishnan visited the Institute for Advanced Study in Princeton. It was the Institute of Advanced Study that inspired him to start a similar institution in India. Ramakrishnan is noted for his work in quantum mechanics on giving a prescription for transition from Pauli to Dirac matrices. He also published several papers giving simple but insightful geometric derivations for the Lorentz transformations.

== Creation of Matscience ==
After his return to Madras (Chennai) from the Institute for Advanced Study in 1958, Ramakrishnan began a Theoretical Physics Seminar in his family home Ekamra Nivas (house with a mango tree). In the seminar he presented lectures on the latest advances in theoretical physics to a small group of students, and invited leading scientists from the world to address the students. In 1960, nobel laureate Niels Bohr visited India and was impressed by the small group of students trained by Ramakrishnan. While in India, Bohr visited Dr. Ramakrishnan's family home, and inspired the creation of an institute for advanced research. With Bohr's recommendation and with support from the then prime minister of India, Jawaharlal Nehru and C.Subramaniam, Alladi Ramakrishan set out to create the institute. Institute of Mathematical Sciences (Matscience) was thus created in 1962 with Ramakrishnan as the director. Subrahmanyan Chandrasekhar, nobel laureate and professor at University of Chicago inaugurated the Institute at the Presidency College in the then Madras. Chandrasekhar also agreed to be an Honorary Professor of Astrophysics at the institute and addressed its first students.

Ramakrishnan travelled and lectured extensively during his years at Matscience, holding lectures at over 200 centers of learning. He was unusually generous with providing opportunity and leave for his Ph.D. students to travel to centers of learning abroad, firmly believing that this was of benefit to his students and that research was an international activity, even if this brought with it the risk of losing talented students to other institutions. After retiring, Ramakrishnan continued to teach and inspire. In the last decades of his life, several high school students and undergraduates came to his home in Madras to learn with him, subsequently pursuing higher studies in the United States towards a career of research.

== Personal life and death ==
Ramakrishnan was married to Lalitha Ramakrishnan, the daughter of mathematics professor H. Subramani Iyer. His son Krishnaswami Alladi is a professor of mathematics at the University of Florida, Gainesville, Florida. Ramakrishnan was a connoisseur of Carnatic music and strongly believed that art and science can go hand in hand. He died on 7 June 2008 at his son's home in Gainesville, Florida.

== See also ==
- Institute of Mathematical Sciences

=== Books ===
- Alladi, Krishnaswami; Klauder, John R.; Rao, Calyampudi R. (2010). The Legacy of Alladi Ramakrishnan in the Mathematical Sciences. Springer. ISBN 978-1-4419-6262-1.
