= E. Sampathkumar =

Indian academic (1936–2024)

- Born: 10 June 1936; Mallur
- Died: 11 August 2024 (aged 88); Mysore
- Citizenship: Indian
- Education: Central College of Bangalore University, Karnataka University
- Occupation: Professor of Mathematics
- Scientific career
- Fields: Graph Theory
- Workplaces: Karnatak University, University of Mysore
- Doctoral advisor: C. N. S. Iyengar
- Website: http://www.tce.edu/events/ncdma07/Sampathkumar.pdf

E. Sampathkumar (10 June 1936 – 11 August 2024) was a professor of graph theory from University of Mysore. He has contributed to domination number, bipartite double cover, and reconstruction theory, as well as other areas of graph theory. He was chairman of the department of mathematics of the Karnataka university, Dharwar and the University of Mysore (1992–95).

Born and raised in Mallur village, Channapatna Taluk, Ramanagaram (District), outside of Bangalore, he earned a M.Sc. (1955) in mathematics from Central College of Bangalore University, and a Ph.D. (1965) in mathematics (Some studies in Boolean algebra) from the Karnataka University, Dharwar. He was a lecturer at the department of mathematics Karnatak College, Dharwar (1960–65), and then professor at the department of mathematics, Karnatak University, Dharwar (1966–1988). After retiring in 1996 from Mysore University (1989–96), he worked for the Department of Science and Technology (India) as a principal investigator on several projects in graph theory. He was head at DOS in Mathematics, University of Mysore (1992–1995).

He was hospitalised for a lung infection on 10 August 2024, and died the following morning.

== Contributions ==
E. Sampathkumar was the first person in India to teach Graph Theory as a subject in an Indian university. He introduced it as a special paper in 1970–71 for MSc Mathematics students at Karnatak University, Dharwad. Per Google Scholar, his H-index was 21 and he had over 1500 citations. Since 2005, his birthday, 10 June, is celebrated as Graph Theory day in India.
