= World Directory of Mathematicians =

Discontinued directory book listing contact information of mathematicians

The World Directory of Mathematicians (WDM) was a directory book listing contact information of active mathematicians around the world. It was published by the International Mathematical Union every four years between 1958 and 2002, with the exception of the second edition published in 1961 and the sixth in 1979.

== History ==
The idea of publishing an international directory of mathematicians was suggested by Ferdinand Rudio, one of the organizers of the first International Congress of Mathematicians held in Zürich in 1897. The first edition of the World Directory of Mathematicians was published in 1958. The work was carried out by the Tata Institute of Fundamental Research led by Komaravolu Chandrasekharan. He continued to serve as the editor for the second and third editions of the Directory. The first edition of the Directory listed about 3500 active mathematicians. The total number grew to over 10 000 in the third edition, which contained for the first time a list of mathematicians of the Soviet Union, on which there were well over 2000 names. Otto Frostman, the Secretary of the IMU, was the editor for the fourth and fifth editions. Unfortunately, he died in 1977 while working on the sixth edition. Masayoshi Nagata took up the task and the sixth edition was published after a delay of one year. Nagata also supervised the seventh edition. Starting from the eighth edition in 1986, the American Mathematical Society became the co-editor with the IMU, and the U.S. member of the IMU Executive Committee would be its responsible editor.

The publication was stopped after the twelfth edition due to the lack of sales, the high production cost and the rise of the internet. The last edition in 2002 listed over 57 000 mathematicians from 71 countries. Two online directories were provided on the IMU website afterwards as a replacement of the paper version, but they were felt to be irrelevant and were retired in 2011.
