= Ramachandran Balasubramanian =

Indian mathematician (born 1951)

- Born: 15 March 1951
- Education: University of Bombay
- Scientific career
- Fields: Mathematics
- Workplaces: Institute of Mathematical Sciences
- Doctoral advisor: K. Ramachandra
- Doctoral students: Sukumar Das Adhikari

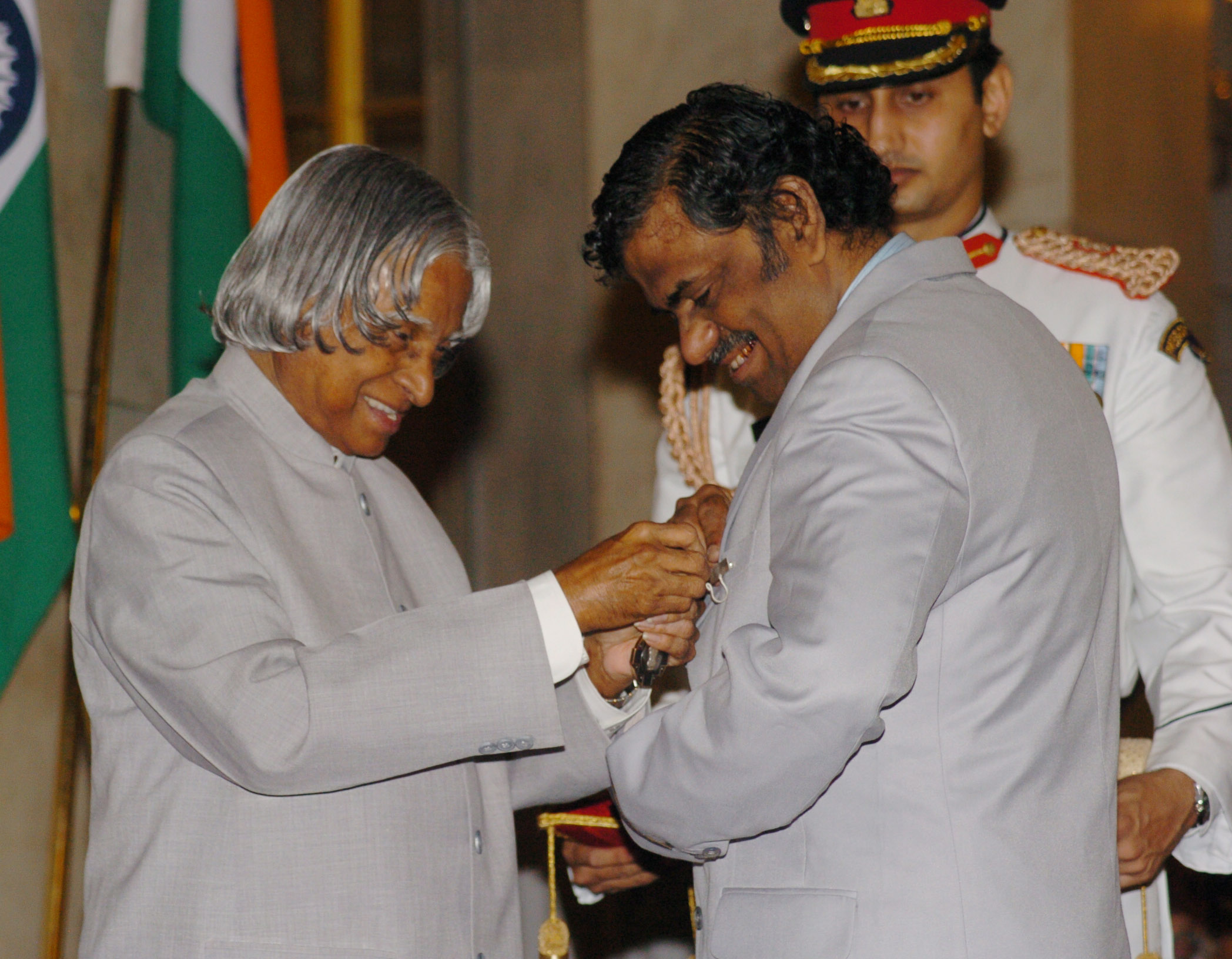
The President, Dr. A.P.J. Abdul Kalam presenting Padma Shri to Prof. Ramachandran Balasubramanian, Director of Institute of Mathematical Science, at investiture ceremony in New Delhi on March 29, 2006

Ramachandran Balasubramanian (born 15 March 1951) is an Indian mathematician and was Director of the Institute of Mathematical Sciences in Chennai, India. He is known for his work in number theory, which includes settling the final g(4) case of Waring's problem in 1986. He is also known for his work in Cryptography which includes his famous work with Koblitz, now commonly called the Balu-Koblitz Theorem. His work in Additive Combinatorics includes his two page paper on additive complements of squares, hence disproving a long standing conjecture of Erdős.

His works on moments of Riemann zeta function is highly appreciated and he was a plenary speaker from India at ICM in 2010. He was a visiting scholar at the Institute for Advanced Study in 1980-81.

He was a student of K. Ramachandra, a lifelong collaborator of Jean-Marc Deshouillers, and co-authored stellar mathematicians like Ram Murty, Kumar Murty, Heath-Brown, N. Koblitz and F. Luca. He was the founder and remains a member of the advisory board of the Hardy-Ramanujan Journal.

== Awards and honours ==
He has received the following awards:

- The Shanti Swarup Bhatnagar Prize for Science and Technology in 1990.
- The French government's Ordre National du Mérite for "furthering Indo-French cooperation in the field of mathematics" in 2003.
- The Padma Shri, the fourth highest civilian award in India, in 2006.
- Fellow of the American Mathematical Society, 2012.
- The Lifetime Achievement Award, 2013 awarded by Manmohan Singh, the Prime Minister of India.
- Fellow of the Indian National Science Academy (1988)
