= Indumathi D. =

Indian particle physicist

Indumathi D. is an Indian particle physicist and a professor at the Institute of Mathematical Sciences (IMSc), Chennai, India. She has been an active member of the Indian Neutrino Observatory (INO) project since its inception.

== Early life and education ==
Indumathi D. grew up in Chennai. Her father was a mechanical engineer, whose work inspired curiosity in her at a young age. Indumathi did her master's in Physics from the Madras Christian College, Chennai. Even though she was more passionate about playing Cricket, an injury led her to pursue a career in Physics.

Indumathi D. obtained her PhD from IMSc in particle physics, where she worked on the spin structure of the photon. Her doctoral advisor was M.V.N. Murthy. As a student, she also wrote a paper on the supernova event SN1987A. Following her postdoctoral appointments at the Physical Research Laboratory(PRL), Ahmedabad, the University of Dortmund in Germany; and then a brief stay at the Indian Institute of Science, Bengaluru, she was appointed a faculty member at the Harish Chandra Research Institute, Allahabad. She returned to IMSc in 1998.

== Research ==
Indumathi’s primary area of research is high energy physics phenomenology. Her research interests include work on atmospheric and solar neutrinos, nucleon and nuclear structure functions, inclusive hadroproduction at colliders, and QED at finite temperature. She has authored several research papers on these topics.

Along with other Indian scientists, Indumathi D. has been a proponent of Indian Neutrino Observatory (INO) which is a project to build the first underground observatory to study atmospheric neutrinos in India. She has been the outreach coordinator and one of the spokespersons for the INO collaboration. She also coordinated a subgroup working on designing INO’s proposed main detector. Indumathi D. has written articles about the feasibility, status, and physical possibilities of the INO detectors.

== Personal life ==
Indumathi D. is married to a computer scientist, and they have two daughters, both of whom are adopted. She has pointed to additional domestic chores as being a reason for the attrition rate of women in science, a dynamic she said is absent in her family.
