= M. Balachandran =

Indian banker

Muthusamy Balachandran (born 1 May 1947) is an Indian banker who served as the chairman and managing director (CMD) of Bank of India from June 2005 to April 2007. Before his appointment as the CMD of Bank of India, he was the executive director of the same bank. He also served as chairman of board of National Payment Corporation of India Limited before steeping down in 2017.

== Career ==
He obtained his M.Sc. in Agriculture, Agriculture Operations and Related Sciences from University of Madras in 1969. His role model was M.S. Swaminathan. He wanted to be a researcher and was almost ready to take up research in plant breeding and genetics but then he gave an interview to Bank of Baroda. He also had a stint of teaching in Agricultural University (TN) before taking to banking as career in 1970.

He commenced his banking career in June 1970 as a Specialist Direct Recruit Officer in Bank of Baroda and worked in different capacities, including as the Senior Manager (Agriculture), Chief Manager (Agriculture), Regional Manager, Deputy General Manager (Priority sector). He stepped in the general banking sector when he was promoted to the position of General Manager and Zonal Manager of Bank of Baroda, Chennai Zone in 1996. Thereafter, he was moved to New York as the chief executive officer of Bank of Baroda of American Branch. He stepped down in 2003.

In 2004, he was appointed as the executive director of Bank of India by the Government of India. On 9 June 2005, he started serving as the chairman and managing director of Bank of India. He was also named as nominee of Bank of India in Indo Zambia Bank. In 2005, he was announced as a director of NABARD Consultancy Services (NABCONS) and also of AFC India, both of them are subsidiaries of NABARD. He was also chairman BOI Shareholding Ltd which is a joint venture between Bank of India (51%) and BSE (49%). He stepped from all his position by April 2007.

In 2007, he was named director of board of Small Industries Development Bank of India as well as of Institute of Banking Personnel Selection.

In 2008, he was named as non-executive chairman of Star Union Dai Ichi Life Insurance Co., which is a joint venture between Bank of India, Union Bank of India and Dai-ichi Life Insurance.

In May 2010, he was named as a trustee of DHAN Foundation.

In 2013, he was announced as a Director of Board of PNB MetLife Insurance Company, a joint venture between Punjab National Bank and MetLife Insurance, and later in same year was also named as Chairman of board of National Payment Corporation of India.

Since 2016, he is serving as an Independent Director of Tamil Nadu Infrastructure Funds Management Corporation (TNIFMC).

Since July 2017, he is Chairman of Sasvitha Home Finance Ltd.
