= C. P. Ramanujam =

Indian mathematician (1938–1974)

- Born: Chidambaram Padmanabhan Ramanujam; 9 January 1938; Madras, Madras Presidency, British India
- Died: 27 October 1974 (age 36); Bangalore, India
- Education: Loyola College, Madras; Tata Institute of Fundamental Research
- Awards: Fellow, Indian Academy of Sciences
- Scientific career
- Fields: Mathematics
- Workplaces: Tata Institute of Fundamental Research
- Doctoral advisor: K. G. Ramanathan

Chidambaram Padmanabhan Ramanujam (9 January 1938 – 27 October 1974) was an Indian mathematician who worked in the fields of number theory and algebraic geometry. He was elected a fellow of the Indian Academy of Sciences in 1973.

As David Mumford put it, Ramanujam felt that the spirit of mathematics demanded of him not merely routine developments but the right theorem on any given topic. "He wanted mathematics to be beautiful and to be clear and simple. He was sometimes tormented by the difficulty of these high standards, but in retrospect, it is clear to us how often he succeeded in adding to our knowledge, results both new, beautiful and with a genuinely original stamp".

== Early life and education ==
Chidambaram Padmanabhan Ramanujam was born to a Tamil family on 9 January 1938 in Madras (now Chennai), India, as the eldest of seven, to Chakravarthi Srinivasa Padmanabhan. He finished his schooling in Town Higher Secondary School, Kumbakonam and joined Loyola College in Madras in 1952. He wanted to specialise in mathematics and he set out to master it with vigour and passion. He also enjoyed music and his favourite musician was M. D. Ramanathan, a maverick concert musician. His teacher and friend at this time was Father (Fr.) Charles Racine (1897-1976), Loyola College a missionary who had obtained his doctorate under the supervision of Élie Cartan. He had been taught mathematics by Father Charles Racine in his final honours years at Loyola College and he encouraged Ramanujam to apply for entry to the School of Mathematics at the Tata Institute in Bombay. In his letter of recommendation Father Charles Racine wrote:-

"He has certainly originality of mind and the type of curiosity which is likely to suggest that he will develop into a good research worker if given sufficient opportunity."

With Father Charles Racine's encouragement and recommendation, Ramanujam applied and was admitted to the graduate school at the Tata Institute of Fundamental Research in Bombay. His father had wanted him to join the Indian Statistical Institute in Calcutta as he had passed the entrance exam meritoriously.

== Career ==
Ramanujam set out for Mumbai at the age of eighteen to pursue his interest in mathematics. He and his friend and schoolmate Raghavan Narasimhan, and S. Ramanan joined TIFR together in 1957. At the Tata Institute there was a stream of first-rate visiting mathematicians from all over the world. It was a tradition for some graduate student to write up the notes of each course of lectures. Accordingly, Ramanujam wrote up in his first year, the notes of Max Deuring's lectures on Algebraic functions of one variable. It was a nontrivial effort and the notes were written clearly and were well received. The analytical mind was much in evidence in this effort as he could simplify and extend the notes within a short time period. "He could reduce difficult solutions to be simple and elegant due to his deep knowledge of the subject matter" states Ramanan. "Max Deuring's lectures gave him a taste for algebraic number theory. He studied not only algebraic geometry and analytic number theory of which he displayed a deep knowledge but he became an expert in several other allied subjects as well".

On the suggestion of his doctoral advisor, K. G. Ramanathan, he began working on a problem relating to the work of the German number theorist Carl Ludwig Siegel. In the course of proving the main result to the effect that every cubic form in 54 variables over any algebraic number field K had a non-trivial zero over that field, he had also simplified the earlier method of Siegel. He took up Waring's problem in algebraic number fields and got interesting results. In recognition of his work and his contribution to Number Theory, the Institute promoted him to associate professor. He protested against this promotion as 'undeserved', and had to be persuaded to accept the position. He proceeded to write his thesis in 1966 and took his doctoral examination in 1967. Dr. Siegel, who was one of the examiners, was highly impressed with the young man's depth of knowledge and his great mathematical abilities.

Ramanujam was a scribe for Igor Shafarevich's course of lectures in 1965 on minimal models and birational transformation of two-dimensional schemes. Professor Shafarevich subsequently wrote to say that Ramanujam not only corrected his mistakes but complemented the proofs of many results. The same was the case with Mumford's lectures on abelian varieties, which were delivered at TIFR around 1967. Mumford wrote in the preface to his book that the notes improved upon his work and that his current work on abelian varieties was a joint effort between him and Ramanujam. During this time he started teaching himself German, Italian, Russian and French so that he could study mathematical works in their original form. His personal library contained quite a few non-English mathematical works.

In 1978, TIFR published a tribute for C. P. Ramanujam. Springer Verlag publication. https://x.com/naa_ganesan/status/2045374322978545922

== Illness and death ==
Between 1964 and 1968, he was making great strides in number theory and his contacts with Shafarevich and Mumford led him on to algebraic geometry. According to Ramanathan and other colleagues, his progress and deep understanding of algebraic geometry was phenomenal. In 1964, based on his participation in the International Colloquium on Differential Analysis, he earned the respect of Alexander Grothendieck and of David Mumford, who invited him to Paris and Harvard. He accepted the invitation and was in Paris, but for a brief period. He was diagnosed in 1964 with schizophrenia with severe depression and left Paris for Chennai. He later decided to quit his position at TIFR.

He quit his post at Mumbai in 1965 after a bout of illness and secured a tenured position as a professor in Chandigarh, Punjab. There he met the young student Chitikila Musili, who later went on to prove interesting results in the geometry connected with the theory of Lie groups and wrote good expository books. Ramanujam stayed in Chandigarh only eight months and he had to return to Chennai again for treatment. TIFR was his real home and he was back there again in June 1965. Around this time he accepted an invitation from Institut des Hautes Études Scientifiques, near Paris. He was barely there before he was flown back to Chennai. Unfortunately schizophrenia, a highly treatable condition today, was not properly diagnosed and treated at that time. Thus he continued until the end of his life to be highly creative for short periods before the recurrent illness overtook him. Again, in 1970, he sent his resignation letter to TIFR but the institute would not take it seriously. Around this time, Mumford invited him to Warwick as a visiting professor during the algebraic geometry year. Mumford writes that he spent many delightful evenings with Ramanujam and that his presence contributed importantly to the success of the algebraic geometry year. A famous paper written during this time, by Michael Artin and David Mumford acknowledges Ramanujam's suggestions and help. He also had a short tenure at Turin where he was widely appreciated and accepted. Just after his death a commemorative hall was named after him in the former Istituto di Matematica (Institute of Mathematics) of the university of Genoa.

Back in India after his year at the University of Warwick, Ramanujam requested for a professorship at the Tata Institute but to be made tenable in their Bangalore campus. The Tata Institute had an applied mathematics wing in Bangalore. Although Ramanjuam had nothing to do with this area, the Institute, wishing him to continue his research, made a special arrangement by which he could stay and work there. By this time, he was deeply affected and depressed by his illness. He was put in charge of a new branch dealing with applied mathematics. He settled down in Bangalore, but again in the depths of depression caused by his illness, he tried to leave the Institute and obtain a university teaching post. During one of the attacks, he tried to take his life, but was rescued in time. However, late one evening on 27 October 1974, after a lively discussion with a visiting foreign professor he took his life with an overdose of barbiturates.

== See also ==
- Ramanujam–Samuel theorem
- Ramanujam vanishing theorem
