= Veraiyur =

- panchayat town
- Location in Tamil Nadu, India
- Coordinates: 12.1°N 79.15°E
- Country: India
- State: Tamil Nadu
- District: Tiruvanamalai

Languages
  - Official: Tamil
- Time zone: UTC+5:30 (IST)

Veraiyur is a panchayat town in Tiruvanamalai district, Tamil Nadu India.
