= A. P. Balachandran =

Indian theoretical physicist (1938–2025)

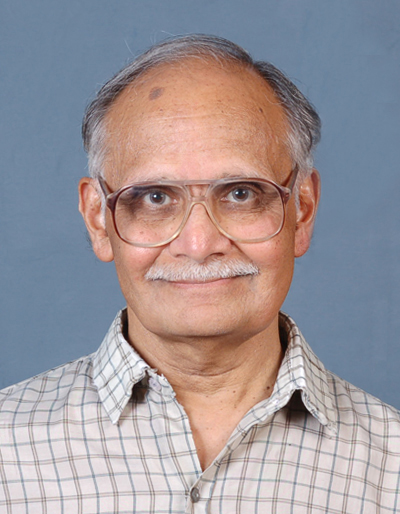
- Balachandran in 2008
- Born: 25 January 1938; Salem, Madras Province, British India (now Tamil Nadu, India)
- Died: 18 April 2025 (aged 87); Coimbatore, Tamil Nadu, India
- Citizenship: Indian
- Education: University of Madras (Ph.D)
- Known for: Topological methods in quantum physics, Works on noncommutative geometry
- Scientific career
- Workplaces: Syracuse University
- Thesis: Some topics in the strong and weak interactions of elementary particles (1962)
- Doctoral advisor: Alladi Ramakrishnan
- Doctoral students: Pierre Ramond

Aiyalam Parameswaran Balachandran (25 January 1938 – 18 April 2025) was an Indian theoretical physicist known for his extensive contributions to the role of classical topology in quantum physics. He was an emeritus professor in the Department of Physics, Syracuse University, where he was previously the Joel Dorman Steele Professor of Physics between 1999 and 2012. He was also a fellow of the American Physical Society since 1988 and was awarded a prize by the U.S. Chapter of the Indian Physics Association in recognition of his outstanding scientific contributions.

In 1990, Syracuse University honoured him with a Chancellor's Citation for Exceptional Academic Achievement.

== Background ==
Balachandran was born on 25 January 1938 in Salem, now in Tamil Nadu, India. His father, Aiyalam Sundaram Parameswaran, was a chartered accountant in Pierce Leslie and Company in Cochin. Balachandran had a gifted poet, Vyloppilli Sreedhara Menon, as his teacher. Balachandran completed his first two college years in Guruvayurappan College, Kozhikode, specialising in physics, chemistry and mathematics and passing the 'Intermediate Examination' with all-State distinction in 1953. He joined BSc (Hons) in Physics at the Madras Christian College, Tambaram, Chennai. Balachandran graduated from MCC in 1958.

Balachandran died on 18 April 2025, at the age of 87.

== Research ==
Balachandran received his PhD degree under Professor Alladi Ramakrishnan at the University of Madras. Then he joined Theoretisch Physics, University at Vienna as a postdoctoral fellow under Professor Walter Thirring, subsequently at the Enrico Fermi Institute likewise as a postdoctoral fellow. In 1964, he joined the Syracuse University faculty. Balachandran's key scientific works to date include the revival of the Skyrme model, which successfully describes baryons as topological solitons of meson fields and mathematical concepts such as homotopy groups and fibre bundles to problems in quantum physics. Latterly, Balachandran's research was focused on the formulation of quantum field theories on noncommutative spacetimes and investigating the emergent significance of Hopf algebras in quantum physics as generalisations of symmetry groups.

== Books ==
- A. P. Balachandran, S. G. Jo, G. Marmo, Group Theory and Hopf Algebras: Lectures for Physicists, World Scientific Publishing Co. Pte. Ltd., 2010. ISBN 978-981-4322-20-1.
- A. P. Balachandran, G. Marmo, B. S. Skagerstam, A. Stern, Classical Topology and Quantum States, World Scientific Publishing Co. Pte. Ltd., Singapore, 1991. ISBN 981-02-0329-2 --ISBN 981-02-0330-6 (pbk.)
- A. P. Balachandran, G. Marmo, B. S. Skagerstam, A. Stern, Gauge Symmetries and Fibre Bundles : Applications to Particle Dynamics, Springer Verlag, 1983. ISBN 0-387-12724-0.
- A. P. Balachandran (editor), A. P. Balachandran, E. Ercolessi, G. Morandi, A.M. Srivastava, Hubbard Model and Anyon Superconductivity, World Scientific Publishing Co. 1990. ISBN 981-02-0348-9.
- A. P. Balachandran, S. Kurkcuoglu, S. Vaidya, Lectures on Fuzzy and Fuzzy Susy Physics, World Scientific Publishing Co. 2007. ISBN 981-270-466-3.
- A. P. Balachandran, G.C. Trahern, Lectures on Group Theory for Physicists, Brill Academic Publishing, 1986. ISBN 88-7088-088-5.
- A. P. Balachandran (editor), Hubbard Model and Anyon Superconductivity, World Scientific Publishing Co. 1991. ISBN 981-02-0349-7.
