= K. S. Chandrasekharan =

Indian mathematician (1920–2017)

Komaravolu Chandrasekharan
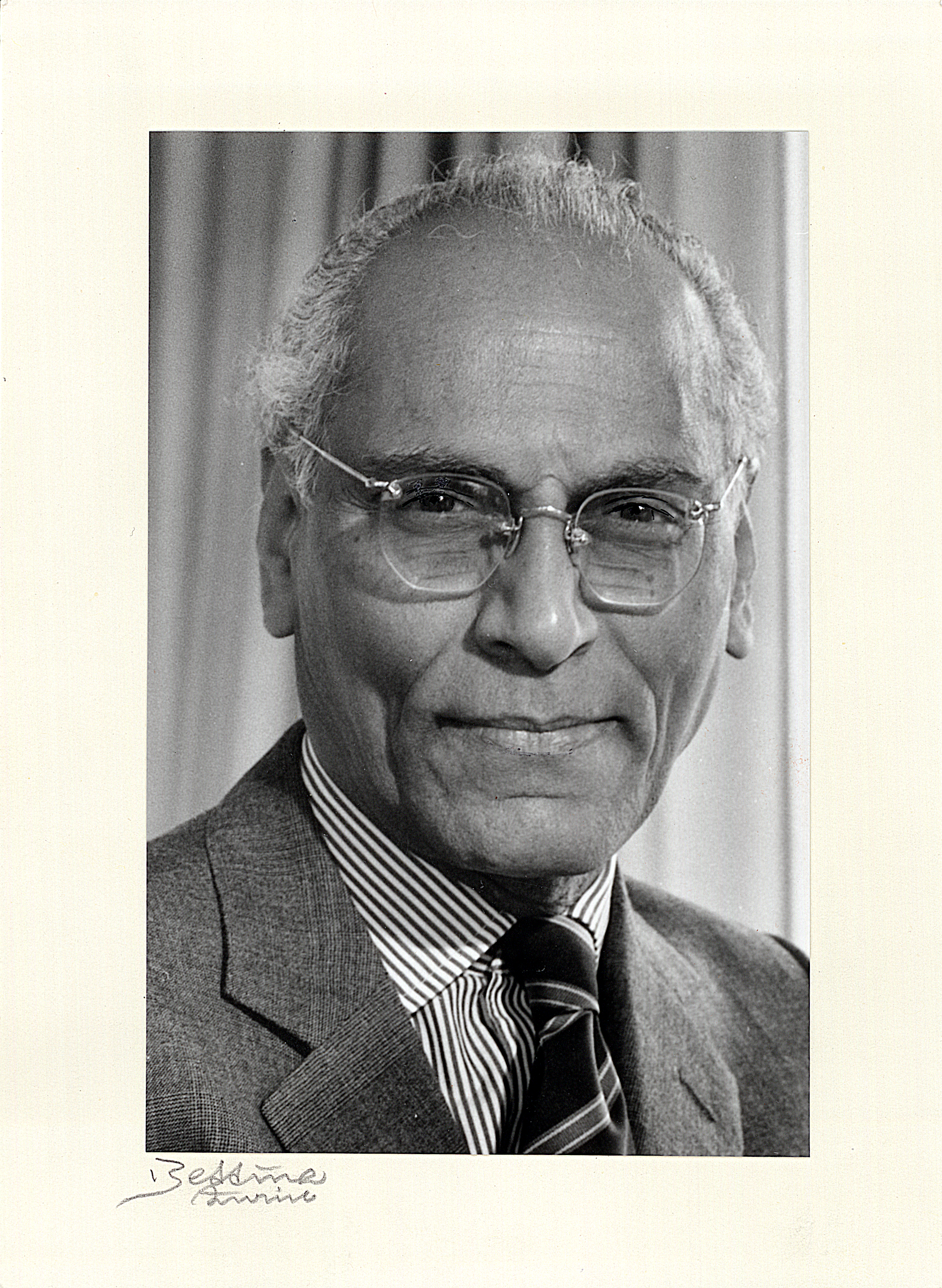
- Born: 21 November 1920; Bapatla, Guntur district, Madras Presidency, British India (now Andhra Pradesh, India)
- Died: 13 April 2017 (aged 96); Zürich, Switzerland
- Citizenship: Indian
- Education: Madras University
- Occupation: Mathematician
- Known for: Administrative intellect, Mathematics, Analytic Number Theory and Mathematical Analysis
- Awards: Srinivasa Ramanujan Medal (1966), Padma Shri (1959), Shanti Swarup Bhatnagar Award for Mathematical Sciences (1963)
- Scientific career
- Fields: Number theory
- Workplaces: TIFR, ETH Zurich
- Doctoral advisor: K. Ananda Rau
- Doctoral students: C. S. Seshadri; M. S. Narasimhan

Komaravolu Chandrasekharan (21 November 1920 – 13 April 2017) was a professor at ETH Zurich and a founding faculty member of School of Mathematics, Tata Institute of Fundamental Research (TIFR). He is known for his work in number theory and summability. He received the Padma Shri, the Shanti Swarup Bhatnagar Award, and the Ramanujan Medal, and he was an honorary fellow of TIFR. He was president of the International Mathematical Union (IMU) from 1971 to 1974.

== Biography ==
Chandrasekharan was born on 21 November 1920 in Machilipatnam, Andhra Pradesh. Chandrasekharan completed his high school from Bapatla village in Guntur from Andhra Pradesh. He completed M.A. in mathematics from the Presidency College, Chennai and a PhD from the Department of Mathematics, University of Madras in 1942, under the supervision of K. Ananda Rau.

When Chandrasekharan was with the Institute for Advanced Study, Princeton, US, Homi Bhabha invited Chandrashekharan to join the School of Mathematics of the Tata Institute of Fundamental Research (TIFR). Chandrashekharan persuaded mathematicians L. Schwarz, C. L. Siegel and others from all over the world to visit TIFR and deliver lectures. In 1965, Chandrasekharan left the Tata Institute of Fundamental Research to join the ETH Zurich, where he retired in 1988.

He was a fellow of the American Mathematical Society.

== Selected works ==
- with Salomon Bochner: Fourier Transforms. Princeton University Press. 1949.
- with S. Minakshisundaram: Typical means. Oxford University Press. 1952. LCCN 53002509.
- Introduction to analytic number theory. Springer. 1968. LCCN 68021990. reprinting 2012
- Arithmetical Functions. Grundlehren der Mathematischen Wissenschaften. Springer. 1970. LCCN 49010722.
- Elliptic Functions. Springer. 1985. ISBN 9780387152950. LCCN 85009802.
- Classical Fourier transforms. Springer-Verlag. 1989. ISBN 0387502483. LCCN 88038192.
- Course on topological groups. Hindustan Book Agency. 2011. ISBN 9789380250205.
- Course on integration theory. Hindustan Book Agency. 2011. ISBN 9789380250199. LCCN 2012472670.
