= Institute of Mathematical Sciences, Chennai =

Research centre located in Chennai, India

The Institute of Mathematical Sciences
- Type: Public
- Established: 1962; 64 years ago
- Director: Amritanshu Prasad (Director)
- Location: Chennai, Tamil Nadu, 600113, India; 12.994219°N 80.247075°E
- Campus: Urban
- Website: www.imsc.res.in

The Institute of Mathematical Sciences (IMSc) (sometimes also referred to as Matscience) is a reputed research centre located in Chennai, India. It is a constituent institute of the Homi Bhabha National Institute.

IMSc is a national institute for fundamental research in frontier disciplines of the mathematical and physical sciences: theoretical computer science, mathematics, theoretical physics, and computational biology. It is funded mainly by the Department of Atomic Energy. The institute operates the Kabru supercomputer.

== History ==
The institute was founded by Alladi Ramakrishnan in 1962 in Chennai. It is modelled after the Institute for Advanced Study, Princeton, New Jersey, United States. It went through a phase of expansion when E. C. G. Sudarshan in the 1980s and R. Ramachandran in the 1990s were the directors. Amritanshu Prasad is currently the director of the institute.

== Academics ==
The institute has a graduate research program to which a group of students are admitted each year to work towards a PhD degree. IMSc hosts scientists at the post-doctoral level and supports a visiting scientist program in areas of research in the institute.

== Campus ==
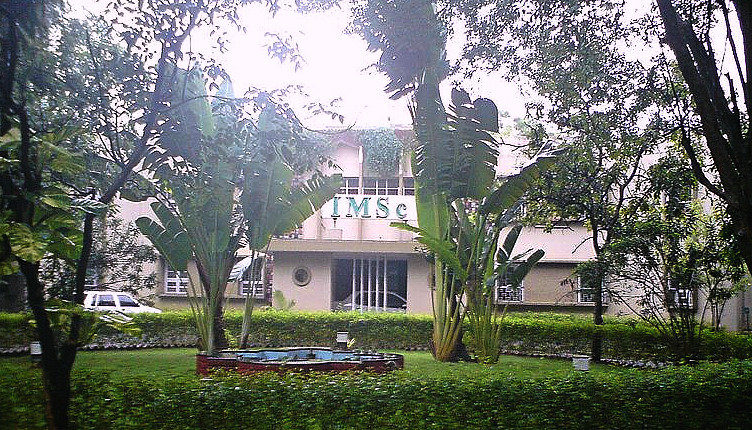
Main Building, Tharamani, campus

Located in South Chennai, in the Adyar-Tharamani area, the institute is on the Central Institutes of Technology (CIT) campus. The institute maintains a student hostel, flatlets for long-term visitors, married students and post-doctoral fellows, and the institute guest house. IMSc has its own faculty housing in Thiruvanmiyur near the seashore.

== Notable people ==
- Ramachandran Balasubramanian, mathematician
- Ganapathy Baskaran, physicist
- Indumathi D., physicist
- Rajiah Simon, physicist
- Radha Balakrishnan, physicist
- C. S. Yogananda, mathematician
