= Shobhana Narasimhan =

Indian scientist

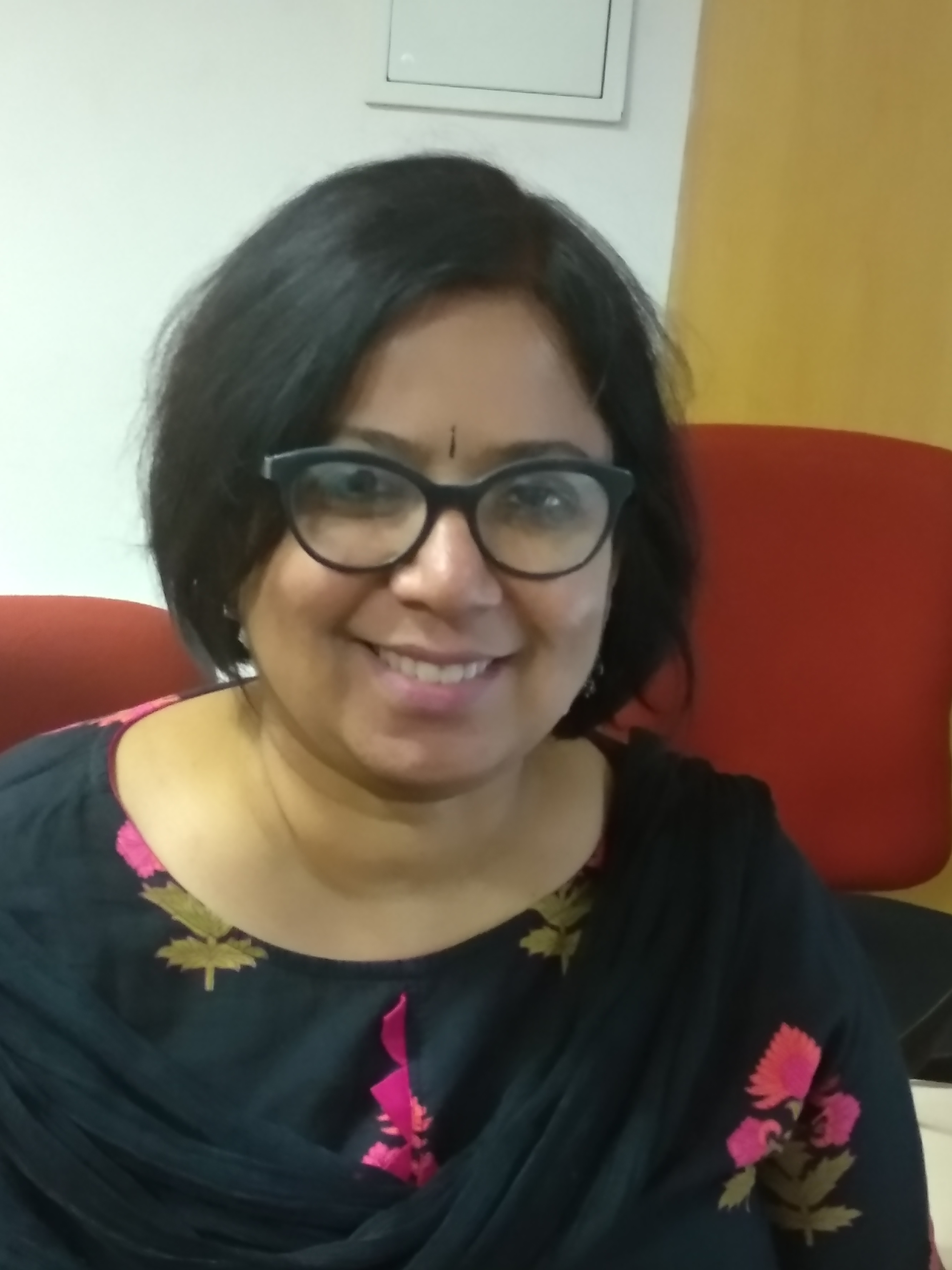
- Education: Harvard University, Indian Institute of Technology Bombay, St. Xavier's College, Mumbai
- Awards: Stree Shakti Samman Science Award, 2010, Kalpana Chawla Woman Scientist Award of the Government of Karnataka, 2010
- Scientific career
- Fields: Computational Nanoscience
- Workplaces: Jawaharlal Nehru Centre for Advanced Scientific Research
- Doctoral advisor: David Vanderbilt

Shobhana Narasimhan is an Indian academic who is Professor of Theoretical Sciences at the Jawaharlal Nehru Centre for Advanced Scientific Research in Bangalore, India. Her main area of interest is computational nanoscience. Her research examines how the lowering of dimensionality and reduction of size affect material properties. She is an International Honorary Member of the American Academy of Arts and Sciences, and a Fellow of the Indian Academy of Sciences the National Academy of Sciences, India and the American Physical Society.

== Education and career ==
Narasimhan earned her B.Sc. in Physics from St. Xavier's College, Mumbai in 1983 and her M.Sc. in Physics from IIT Bombay in 1985. She received her Ph.D. in Theoretical Physics from Harvard University in 1991 where she was advised by David Vanderbilt. Subsequently, she did her postdoctoral work at Brookhaven National Laboratory, USA and at Fritz-Haber-Institut of the Max Planck Society in Berlin, Germany. She joined the Theoretical Sciences Unit of Jawaharlal Nehru Centre for Advanced Scientific Research, Bangalore, India as a faculty member in 1996. She was formerly Chair of the Theoretical Sciences Unit and Dean of Academic Affairs at JNCASR.

== Research Interests ==
Shobhana Narasimhan's group primarily focuses on exploring the novel physics and chemistry of materials at nanoscale. The group uses this nanoscale understanding to design materials with novel functionalities by using quantum mechanical density functional theory. The group uses first principles calculations without any empirical input (apart from atomic numbers and masses) to derive information about the material structure and its functional properties. While the nature of research of highly fundamental, the results have been applied to developing nanocatalysts for clean energy and designing magnetic materials for data storage. The research falls under the category of computational nanotechnology in the field of condensed matter physics. The group is currently aiming to develop microscopic descriptors that can be correlated with the macroscopic properties of the material as an alternative to performing density functional theory calculations or conducting empirical studies and supplement these descriptors by using machine learning approaches.

Some sub-topics of interest include:

- Rational design of catalysts - The group has conducted theoretical studies in collaboration with Stefano de Gironcoli from SISSA, Triesteto to show that the morphology of gold nanoparticles switches from 3D shapes to 2D ones upon doping the oxide substrate (that supports the gold nanoparticles) with an electron donor. Subsequent work in the group of H-J Freund in Berlin verified this prediction about a change in the morphology of gold nanoparticles deposited on doped oxide supports
- Mixing and Magnetism on surfaces - The theoretical calculations conducted by the group showed that surface alloying of bulk-immiscible constituents can be driven by magnetism as opposed to the generally believed reduction of surface stress
- Gas storage - The group has collaborated with Ganapathy Ayappa at the Indian Institute of Science and BPCL to study hydrogen storage for future energy applications. Ab initio density functional calculations on different graphene-based systems are used to assess and formulate strategies for enhancing the adsorptive capacity of carbon

The group is also looking at spintronics to control properties such as magnetoresistance and exploring new aspects of magnetism at nanoscale such as spin spirals.

== Teaching and Contribution to Women in Sciences ==
Narasimhan has a strong interest in innovative teaching methods and organized and participated in many interactive workshops in several countries such as China, Ethiopia, South Africa, Ghana, Kenya, Rwanda, Iran, USA and India. As part of the Quantum ESPRESSO group and the African School for Electronic Structure Methods and Applications (ASESMA), Narasimhan has taught solid state physics and density functional theory through workshops in Asia and Africa. She is keen on promoting participation of women in science. She was a member of Working Group for Women in Physics of IUPAP. As a member of the Standing Committee on Women in Science and National Task Force on Women in Science she has made recommendations on how government should change its policies to promote female participation in sciences. Some of these recommendations include having at least one woman member in every hiring, promotion and award committee, ensuring flexi-time for women and increasing days of maternity leave. She has also organized several Career Development Workshops since 2013 for Women in Physics at the International Centre for Theoretical Physics in Trieste, Italy and at the East African Institute for Fundamental Research in Kigali, Rwanda. As part of her paper titled, Leaving and Entering a Career in Physics, Narasimhan studied factors that cause women to leave physics and the effect of taking a break on their career. The possibility of a flexible career path and ways to retain female physicists were also discussed.

== Recognition ==
In 2021, she became a laureate of the Asian Scientist 100 by the Asian Scientist. She was named a Fellow of the American Physical Society in 2022 "for significant contributions to promoting diversity, combating discrimination in the physics community, and conceiving and organizing Career Development Workshops for Women in Physics that have had a transformative effect on the trajectories of female physicists".

== Public Lectures and Seminars ==
=== Technical Presentations ===
1. Agents of Change: The Role of Catalysts in Modern World
2. Using Descriptors to Design Novel Nanomaterials
3. New Horizons in Physics
4. Rational Design of Catalysts
5. How to write research articles

=== Talks on Women in STEM ===
1. Why it is (still) difficult to be a woman in science
2. "No longer alone!": Career Development Workshops for Women in Physics
3. Indian Women in Stem

== Publications ==
Shobhana Narasimhan publications as indexed on the group webpage.
