= Kanakanahalli Ramachandra =

Indian mathematician

- Born: 18 August 1933; Mandya, Mysore Princely State
- Died: 17 January 2011 (aged 77)
- Education: University of Bombay
- Scientific career
- Fields: Mathematics
- Workplaces: Tata Institute of Fundamental Research National Institute of Advanced Studies
- Doctoral advisor: K. G. Ramanathan
- Doctoral students: T. N. Shorey; Ramachandran Balasubramanian
- Other notable students: Atiyolil Venugopalan

Kanakanahalli Ramachandra (18 August 1933 – 17 January 2011) was an Indian mathematician working in both analytic number theory and algebraic number theory.

== Early career ==
Ramachandra went to the Tata Institute of Fundamental Research (TIFR), Bombay, for his graduate studies in 1958. He obtained his PhD from University of Mumbai in 1965; his doctorate was guided by K. G. Ramanathan.

== Later career ==
Between the years 1965 and 1995 he worked at the Tata Institute of Fundamental Research and after retirement joined the National Institute of Advanced Studies, Bangalore where he worked till 2011, the year he died. During the course of his lifetime, he published over 200 articles, of which over 170 have been catalogued by Mathematical Reviews.

His work was primarily in the area of analytic number theory, working on the Riemann zeta function and allied functions. Apart from analytic number theory, he made substantial contributions to the theory of transcendental number theory, in which he is known for his proof of the six exponentials theorem, achieved independently of Serge Lang. He also contributed to many other areas of number theory.

In 1978 he founded the Hardy–Ramanujan journal, and published it on behalf of the Hardy–Ramanujan society until his death.

== Awards and distinctions ==
- Elected President of the Calcutta Mathematical Society for the period; 2007–2010

== Publications ==
- Ramachandra, K. (1969), Lectures on transcendental numbers, The Ramanujan Institute Lecture Notes, vol. 1, The Ramanujan Institute, Madras, MR 0260678
- Ramachandra, K. (1995), On the mean-value and omega-theorems for the Riemann zeta-function, Tata Institute of Fundamental Research Lectures on Mathematics and Physics, vol. 85, Published for the Tata Institute of Fundamental Research, Bombay, ISBN 978-3-540-58437-7, MR 1332493
