= Ramaswamy S. Vaidyanathaswamy =

Indian mathematician

Ramaswamy S. Vaidyanathaswamy (1894–1960) was an Indian mathematician who wrote the first textbook of point-set topology in India.

He is notable for having been the first to discover the generalisation of the crystallographic restriction theorem to arbitrary dimensions.

== Life ==
He was born in India on 24 October 1894.

Vaidyanathaswamy studied Mathematics at the University of Edinburgh in Scotland, under Prof Edmund Taylor Whittaker graduating around 1914. He then did postgraduate studies at the University of Cambridge under Prof H. F. Baker. After his return to India, he was a professor at the University of Madras, and after his retirement was associated with the Indian Statistical Institute in Calcutta.

He contributed extensively to point-set topology, and wrote a well-known textbook on the subject (and the first such textbook published in India), "Set Topology", which was first published in 1947. A second edition, published in 1960, was reprinted by Dover Publications in 1999.

He was elected a fellow of the Royal Society of Edinburgh in 1924. His proposers were Herbert Westren Turnbull, Edmund Taylor Whittaker, Ralph Allan Sampson and James Hartley Ashworth.

He was president of the Indian Mathematical Society from 1940 to 1942.

== Selected publications ==
- Vaidyanathaswamy, R (1930). "A Theorem on the Rational Norm Curve". Journal of the London Mathematical Society. 5 (4): 249–253. doi:10.1112/jlms/s1-5.4.249.
- Vaidyanathaswamy, R (1958). "The algebra of cubic residues". Journal of Indian Mathematical Society. 21: 57–66. Archived from the original on 24 June 2004.
