= Order (mathematics) =

Order in mathematics may refer to:

== Set theory ==
- Total order and partial order, a binary relation generalizing the usual ordering of numbers and of words in a dictionary
- Ordered set
- Order in Ramsey theory, uniform structures in consequence to critical set cardinality

== Algebra ==
- Order (group theory), the cardinality of a group or period of an element
- Order of a polynomial (disambiguation)
- Order of a square matrix, its dimension
- Order (ring theory), an algebraic structure
- Ordered group
- Ordered field

== Analysis ==
- Order (differential equation) or order of highest derivative, of a differential equation
- Leading-order terms
- NURBS order, a number one greater than the degree of the polynomial representation of a non-uniform rational B-spline
- Order of convergence, a measurement of convergence
- Order of derivation
- Order of an entire function
- Order of a power series, the lowest degree of its terms
- Ordered list, a sequence or tuple
- Orders of approximation in Big O notation
- Z-order (curve), a space-filling curve

== Arithmetic ==
- Multiplicative order in modular arithmetic
- Order of operations
- Orders of magnitude, a class of scale or magnitude of any amount

== Combinatorics ==
- Order in the Josephus permutation
- Ordered selections and partitions of the twelvefold way in combinatorics
- Ordered set, a bijection, cyclic order, or permutation
- Weak order of permutations

== Fractals ==
- Complexor, or complex order in fractals
- Order of extension in Lakes of Wada
- Order of fractal dimension (Rényi dimensions)
- Orders of construction in the Pythagoras tree

== Geometry ==
- Long-range aperiodic order, in pinwheel tiling, for instance

== Graphs ==
- Graph order, the number of nodes in a graph
- First order and second order logic of graphs
- Topological ordering of directed acyclic graphs
- Degeneracy ordering of undirected graphs
- Elimination ordering of chordal graphs
- Order, the complexity of a structure within a graph: see haven (graph theory) and bramble (graph theory)

== Logic ==
In logic, model theory and type theory:

- Zeroth-order logic
- First-order logic
- Second-order logic
- Higher-order logic

== Order theory ==
- Order (journal), an academic journal on order theory
- Dense order, a total order wherein between any unequal pair of elements there is always an intervening element in the order
- Glossary of order theory
- Lexicographical order, an ordering method on sequences analogous to alphabetical order on words
- List of order topics, list of order theory topics
- Order theory, study of various binary relations known as orders
- Order topology, a topology of total order for totally ordered sets
- Ordinal numbers, numbers assigned to sets based on their set-theoretic order
- Partial order, often called just "order" in order theory texts, a transitive antisymmetric relation
- Total order, a partial order that is also total, in that either the relation or its inverse holds between any unequal elements

== Statistics ==
- Order statistics
- First-order statistics, e.g., arithmetic mean, median, quantiles
- Second-order statistics, e.g., correlation, power spectrum, variance
- Higher-order statistics, e.g., bispectrum, kurtosis, skewness
