= Rogers–Ramanujan continued fraction =

Continued fraction closely related to the Rogers–Ramanujan identities

The Rogers–Ramanujan continued fraction is a continued fraction discovered by Rogers (1894) and independently by Srinivasa Ramanujan, and closely related to the Rogers–Ramanujan identities. It can be evaluated explicitly for a broad class of values of its argument.

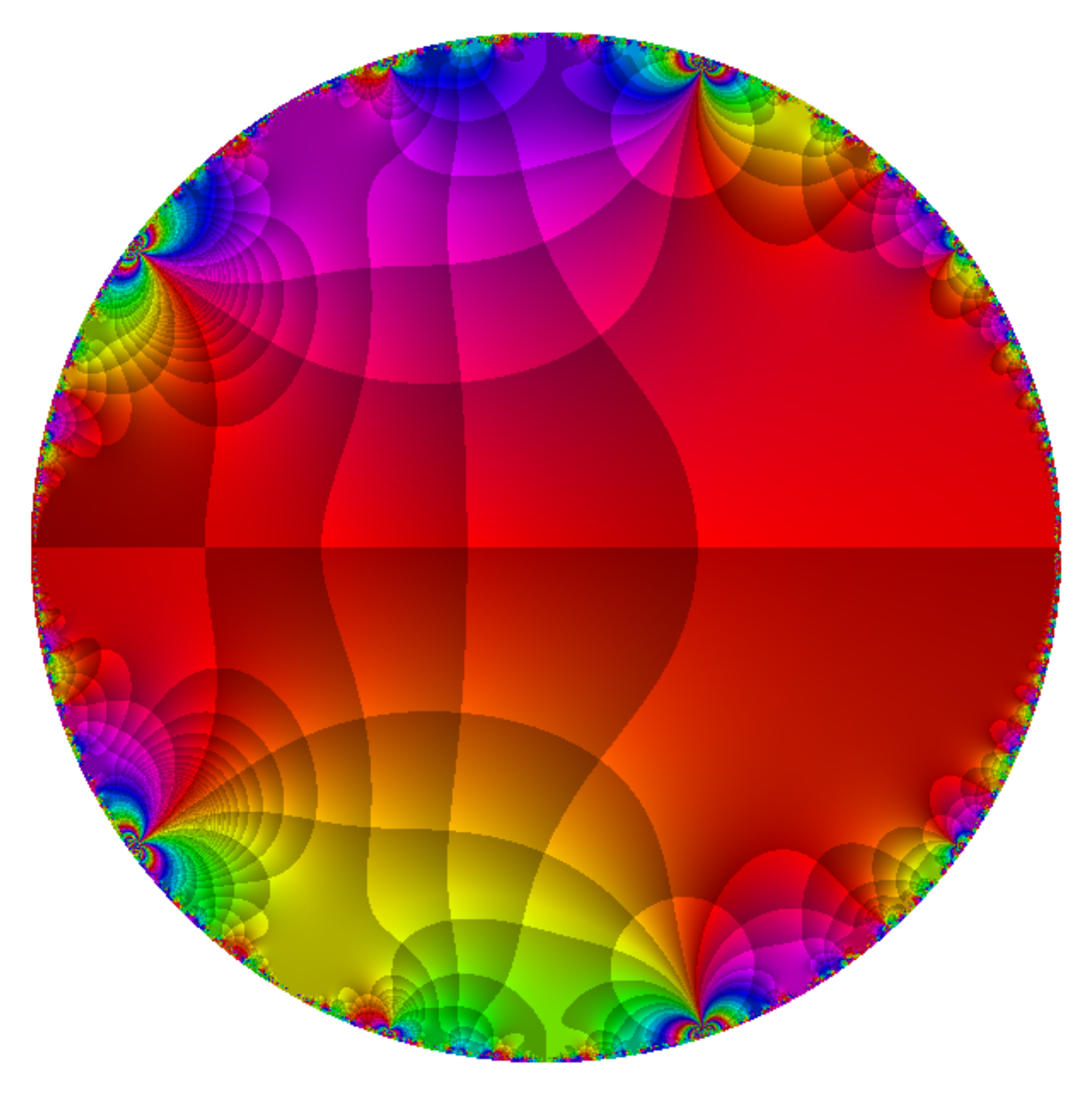
Domain coloring representation of the convergent $A_{400}(q)/B_{400}(q)$ of the function $q^{-1/5}R(q)$, where $R(q)$ is the Rogers–Ramanujan continued fraction.

== Definition ==
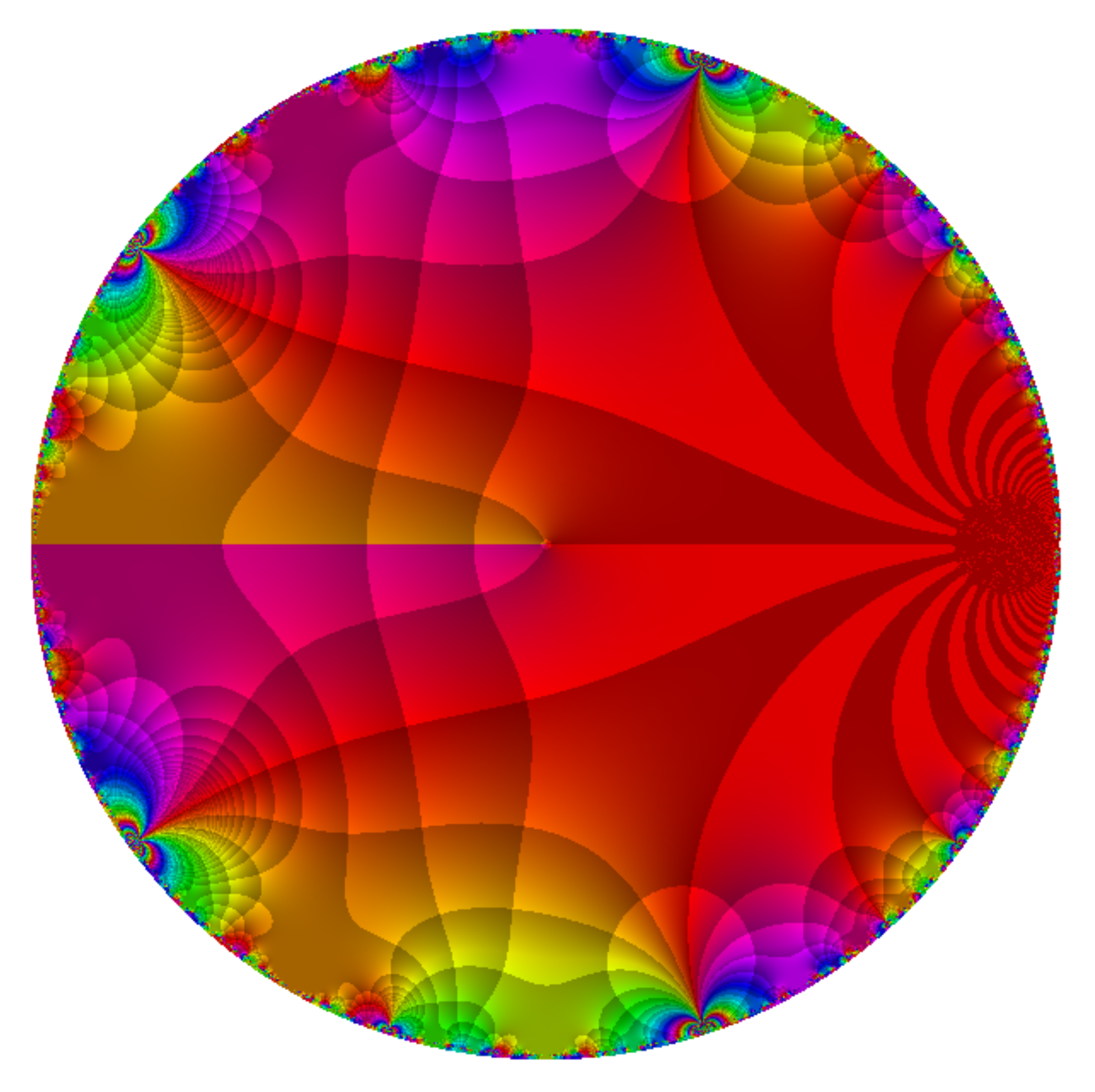
Representation of the approximation $q^{1/5}A_{400}(q)/B_{400}(q)$ of the Rogers–Ramanujan continued fraction.

Given the functions $G(q)$ and $H(q)$ appearing in the Rogers–Ramanujan identities, and assume $q=e^{2\pi i \tau}$,

$$\begin{align}G(q)
&= \sum_{n=0}^\infty \frac {q^{n^2}} {(1-q)(1-q^2)\cdots(1-q^n)} =\sum_{n=0}^\infty \frac {q^{n^2}} {(q;q)_n} = \frac {1}{(q;q^5)_\infty (q^4; q^5)_\infty}\\[6pt]
&= \prod_{n=1}^\infty \frac{1}{(1-q^{5n-1})(1-q^{5n-4})}\\[6pt]
&=\sqrt[60]{q\,j}\,\,_2F_1\left(-\tfrac{1}{60},\tfrac{19}{60};\tfrac{4}{5};\tfrac{1728}{j}\right)\\[6pt]
&=\sqrt[60]{q\left(j-1728\right)}\,_2F_1\left(-\tfrac{1}{60},\tfrac{29}{60};\tfrac{4}{5};-\tfrac{1728}{j-1728}\right)\\[6pt]
&= 1+ q +q^2 +q^3 +2q^4+2q^5 +3q^6+\cdots
\end{align}$$

and,

$$\begin{align}H(q)
&= \sum_{n=0}^\infty \frac {q^{n^2+n}} {(1-q)(1-q^2)\cdots(1-q^n)}  =\sum_{n=0}^\infty \frac {q^{n^2+n}} {(q;q)_n} = \frac {1}{(q^2;q^5)_\infty (q^3; q^5)_\infty}\\[6pt]
&= \prod_{n=1}^\infty \frac{1}{(1-q^{5n-2})(1-q^{5n-3})}\\[6pt]
&=\frac{1}{\sqrt[60]{q^{11}j^{11}}}\,_2F_1\left(\tfrac{11}{60},\tfrac{31}{60};\tfrac{6}{5};\tfrac{1728}{j}\right)\\[6pt]
&=\frac{1}{\sqrt[60]{q^{11}\left(j-1728\right)^{11}}}\,_2F_1\left(\tfrac{11}{60},\tfrac{41}{60};\tfrac{6}{5};-\tfrac{1728}{j-1728}\right)\\[6pt]
&= 1+q^2 +q^3 +q^4+q^5 +2q^6+2q^7+\cdots
\end{align}$$

with the coefficients of the q-expansion being OEIS: A003114 and OEIS: A003106, respectively, where $(a;q)_\infty$ denotes the infinite q-Pochhammer symbol, j is the j-function, and _{2}F_{1} is the hypergeometric function. The Rogers–Ramanujan continued fraction is then

$$\begin{align}R(q)
&= \frac{q^{\frac{11}{60}}H(q)}{q^{-\frac{1}{60}}G(q)} = q^{\frac{1}{5}}\prod_{n=1}^\infty \frac{(1-q^{5n-1})(1-q^{5n-4})}{(1-q^{5n-2})(1-q^{5n-3})}=q^{1/5}\prod^{\infty}_{n=1}(1-q^n)^{(n|5)} \\[8pt]
&= \cfrac{q^{1/5}}{1+\cfrac{q}{1+\cfrac{q^2}{1+\cfrac{q^3}{1+\ddots}}}}
\end{align}$$
$(n\mid m)$ is the Jacobi symbol.

One should be careful with notation since the formulas employing the j-function $j$ will be consistent with the other formulas only if $q=e^{2\pi i \tau}$ (the square of the nome) is used throughout this section since the q-expansion of the j-function (as well as the well-known Dedekind eta function) uses $q=e^{2\pi i \tau}$. However, Ramanujan, in his examples to Hardy and given below, used the nome $q=e^{\pi i \tau}$instead.

== Special values ==
If q is the nome or its square, then $q^{-\frac{1}{60}}G(q)$ and $q^{\frac{11}{60}}H(q)$, as well as their quotient $R(q)$, are related to modular functions of $\tau$. Since they have integral coefficients, the theory of complex multiplication implies that their values for $\tau$ involving an imaginary quadratic field are algebraic numbers that can be evaluated explicitly.

=== Examples of R(q) ===
Given the general form where Ramanujan used the nome $q = e^{\pi i \tau}$,

$$R(q) = \cfrac{q^{1/5}}{1+\cfrac{q}{1+\cfrac{q^2}{1+\cfrac{q^3}{1+\ddots}}}}$$

f when $\tau = i$,

$$R\big(e^{-\pi}\big) = \cfrac{e^{-\frac{\pi}{5}}}{1 + \cfrac{e^{-\pi}}{1 + \cfrac{e^{-2\pi}}{1+\ddots}}} = \tfrac{1}{2}\varphi\,(\sqrt{5}-\varphi^{3/2})(\sqrt[4]{5}+\varphi^{3/2}) = 0.511428\dots$$

when $\tau = 2i$,

$$R\big(e^{-2\pi}\big) = \cfrac{e^{-\frac{2\pi}{5}}}{1 + \cfrac{e^{-2\pi}}{1 + \cfrac{e^{-4\pi}}{1+\ddots}}} = {\sqrt[4]{5}\,\varphi^{1/2}-\varphi} = 0.284079\dots$$

when $\tau = 4i$,

$$R\big(e^{-4\pi}\big) = \cfrac{e^{-\frac{4\pi}{5}}}{1 + \cfrac{e^{-4\pi}}{1 + \cfrac{e^{-8\pi}}{1+\ddots}}} = \tfrac{1}{2}\varphi\,(\sqrt{5}-\varphi^{3/2})(-\sqrt[4]{5}+\varphi^{3/2}) = 0.081002\dots$$

when $\tau = 2\sqrt{5}i$,

$$R\big(e^{-2\sqrt{5}\pi}\big) = \cfrac{e^{-\frac{2\pi}{\sqrt5}}}{1+\cfrac{e^{-2\pi\sqrt{5}}}{1 + \cfrac{e^{-4\pi\sqrt{5}}}{1+\ddots}}} = \frac{\sqrt{5}}{1+\big(5^{3/4} (\varphi-1)^{5/2}-1\big)^{1/5}} - \varphi = 0.0602094\dots$$

when $\tau = 5i$,

$$R\big(e^{-5\pi}\big) = \cfrac{e^{-\pi}}{1+\cfrac{e^{-5\pi}}{1 + \cfrac{e^{-10\pi}}{1+\ddots}}} = \frac{1+\varphi^2}{\varphi+\big(\frac{1}{2}(4-\varphi-3\sqrt{\varphi-1})(3\varphi^{3/2}-\sqrt[4]{5})\big)^{1/5}} - \varphi = 0.0432139\dots$$

when $\tau = 10i$,

$$R\big(e^{-10\pi}\big) = \cfrac{e^{-2\pi}}{1+\cfrac{e^{-10\pi}}{1 + \cfrac{e^{-20\pi}}{1+\ddots}}} = \frac{1+\varphi^2}{\varphi+\big(3\sqrt{1+\varphi^2}-4-\varphi\big)^{1/5}} - \varphi = 0.00186744\dots$$

when $\tau = 20i$,

$$R\big(e^{-20\pi}\big) = \cfrac{e^{-4\pi}}{1+\cfrac{e^{-20\pi}}{1 + \cfrac{e^{-40\pi}}{1+\ddots}}} = \frac{1+\varphi^2}{\varphi+\big(\frac{1}{2}(4-\varphi-3\sqrt{\varphi-1})(3\varphi^{3/2}+\sqrt[4]{5})\big)^{1/5}} - \varphi = 0.00000348734\dots$$

and $\varphi=\tfrac{1+\sqrt5}{2}$ is the golden ratio. Note that $R\big(e^{-2\pi}\big)$ is a positive root of the quartic equation,

$$x^4+2x^3-6x^2-2x+1=0$$

while $R\big(e^{-\pi}\big)$ and $R\big(e^{-4\pi}\big)$ are two positive roots of a single octic,

$$y^4+2\varphi^4 y^3+6\varphi^2 y^2-2\varphi^4 y+1=0$$

(since $\varphi$ has a square root) which explains the similarity of the two closed-forms. More generally, for positive integer m, then $R(e^{-2\pi/m})$ and $R(e^{-2\pi\, m})$ are two roots of the same equation as well as,

$$\bigl[R(e^{-2\pi/m}) +\varphi\bigr] \bigl[R(e^{-2\pi\, m}) +\varphi\bigr] = \sqrt5\,\varphi$$

The algebraic degree k of $R(e^{-\pi\, n})$ for $n = 1,2,3,4,\dots$ is $k = 8,4,32,8,\dots$ (OEIS: A082682).

Incidentally, these continued fractions can be used to solve some quintic equations as shown in a later section.

=== Examples of G(q) and H(q) ===
Interestingly, there are explicit formulas for $G(q)$ and $H(q)$ in terms of the j-function $j(\tau)$ and the Rogers-Ramanujan continued fraction $R(q)$. However, since $j(\tau)$ uses the nome's square $q = e^{2\pi\,i\tau}$, then one should be careful with notation such that $j(\tau),\,G(q),\, H(q)$ and $r = R(q)$ use the same $q$.

$$\begin{align}
G(q) &= \prod_{n=1}^\infty \frac{1}{(1-q^{5n-1})(1-q^{5n-4})}\\[6pt]
&= q^{1/60} \frac{j(\tau)^{1/60}}{(r^{20}-228r^{15}+494r^{10}+228r^5+1)^{1/20}}
\end{align}$$

$$\begin{align}
H(q) &= \prod_{n=1}^\infty \frac{1}{(1-q^{5n-2})(1-q^{5n-3})}\\[6pt]
&= \frac{-1}{q^{11/60}} \frac{(r^{20}-228r^{15}+494r^{10}+228r^5+1)^{11/20}}{j(\tau)^{11/60}\,(r^{10}+11r^5-1)}
\end{align}$$

Of course, the secondary formulas imply that $q^{-1/60}G(q)$ and $q^{11/60}H(q)$ are algebraic numbers (though normally of high degree) for $\tau$ involving an imaginary quadratic field. For example, the formulas above simplify to,

$$\begin{align}
G(e^{-2\pi})
&= (e^{-2\pi})^{1/60} \frac1{(5\,\varphi)^{1/4}} \frac1{\sqrt{ R(e^{-2\pi}) }} \\[6pt]
&= 1.00187093\dots\\[6pt]
H(e^{-2\pi})
&= \frac1{(e^{-2\pi})^{11/60}} \frac1{(5\,\varphi)^{1/4}} \sqrt{ R(e^{-2\pi}) } \\[6pt]
&= 1.00000349\ldots
\end{align}$$

and,

$$\begin{align}
G(e^{-4\pi})
&= (e^{-4\pi})^{1/60} \frac1{(5\,\varphi^3)^{1/4}\,(\varphi+\sqrt[4]{5})^{1/4}} \frac1{\sqrt{ R(e^{-4\pi}) }} \\[6pt]
&= 1.000003487354\dots\\[6pt]
H(e^{-4\pi})
&= \frac1{(e^{-4\pi})^{11/60}} \frac1{(5\,\varphi^3)^{1/4}\,(\varphi+\sqrt[4]{5})^{1/4}} \sqrt{ R(e^{-4\pi}) } \\[6pt]
&= 1.000000000012\dots
\end{align}$$

and so on, with $\varphi$ as the golden ratio.

== Derivation of special values ==
=== Tangential sums ===
In the following we express the essential theorems of the Rogers-Ramanujan continued fractions R and S by using the tangential sums and tangential differences:

$$a \oplus b = \tan\bigl[\arctan(a) + \arctan(b)\bigr] = \frac{a + b}{1 - ab}$$

$$c \ominus d = \tan\bigl[\arctan(c) - \arctan(d)\bigr] = \frac{c - d}{1 + cd}$$

The elliptic nome and the complementary nome have this relationship to each other:

$$\ln(q) \ln(q_{1}) = \pi^2$$

The complementary nome of a modulus k is equal to the nome of the Pythagorean complementary modulus:

$$q_{1}(k) = q(k') = q(\sqrt{1 - k^2})$$

These are the reflection theorems for the continued fractions R and S:

$S(q) \oplus S(q_1)= \Phi$
$R(q^2) \oplus R(q_1^2)= \Phi^{-1}$

The letter $\Phi$ represents the Golden number exactly:

$$\Phi = \tfrac{1}{2}(\sqrt{5} + 1) = \cot[\tfrac{1}{2}\arctan(2)] = 2\cos(\tfrac{1}{5}{\pi})$$

$$\Phi^{-1} = \tfrac{1}{2}(\sqrt{5} - 1) = \tan[\tfrac{1}{2}\arctan(2)] = 2\sin(\tfrac{1}{10}{\pi})$$

The theorems for the squared nome are constructed as follows:

$R(q)^2 R(q^2)^{-1}\oplus R(q)R(q^2)^2 =1$
$S(q)^2 R(q^2)^{-1}\ominus S(q)R(q^2)^2 =1$

Following relations between the continued fractions and the Jacobi theta functions are given:

$S(q) \oplus R(q^2) = \frac{\vartheta_{00}(q^{1/5})^2 - \vartheta_{00}(q)^2}{5\,\vartheta_{00}(q^5)^2 - \vartheta_{00}(q)^2}$
$R(q) \ominus R(q^2) = \frac{\vartheta_{01}(q)^2 - \vartheta_{01}(q^{1/5})^2}{5\,\vartheta_{01}(q^5)^2 - \vartheta_{01}(q)^2}$

=== Derivation of Lemniscatic values ===
Into the now shown theorems certain values are inserted:

$$S\bigl[\exp(-\pi)\bigr] \oplus S\bigl[\exp(-\pi)\bigr] = \Phi$$

Therefore following identity is valid:

$S\bigl[\exp(-\pi)\bigr] = \tan\bigl[\tfrac{1}{2}\arctan(\Phi)\bigr] = \tan\bigl[\tfrac{1}{4}\pi - \tfrac{1}{4}\arctan(2)\bigr]$

In an analogue pattern we get this result:

$$R\bigl[\exp(-2\pi)\bigr] \oplus R\bigl[\exp(-2\pi)\bigr] = \Phi^{-1}$$

Therefore following identity is valid:

$R\bigl[\exp(-2\pi)\bigr] = \tan\bigl[\tfrac{1}{2}\arctan(\Phi^{-1})\bigr] = \tan\bigl[\tfrac{1}{4}\arctan(2)\bigr]$

Furthermore we get the same relation by using the above mentioned theorem about the Jacobi theta functions:

$$S\bigl[\exp(-\pi)\bigr] \oplus R\bigl[\exp(-2\pi)\bigr] = S(q) \oplus R(q^2) \bigl[q = \exp(-\pi)\bigr] =$$

$$= \frac{\vartheta_{00}(q^{1/5})^2 - \vartheta_{00}(q)^2}{5\,\vartheta_{00}(q^5)^2 - \vartheta_{00}(q)^2} \bigl[q = \exp(-\pi)\bigr] = 1$$

This result appears because of the Poisson summation formula and this equation can be solved in this way:

$$R\bigl[\exp(-2\pi)\bigr] = 1 \ominus S\bigl[\exp(-\pi)\bigr] = 1 \ominus \tan\bigl[\tfrac{1}{4}\pi - \tfrac{1}{4}\arctan(2)\bigr] = \tan\bigl[\tfrac{1}{4}\arctan(2)\bigr]$$

By taking the other mentioned theorem about the Jacobi theta functions a next value can be determined:

$$R\bigl[\exp(-\pi)\bigr] \ominus R\bigl[\exp(-2\pi)\bigr] = R(q) \ominus R(q^2) \bigl[q = \exp(-\pi)\bigr] =$$

$$= \frac{\vartheta_{01}(q)^2 - \vartheta_{01}(q^{1/5})^2}{5\,\vartheta_{01}(q^5)^2 - \vartheta_{01}(q)^2} \bigl[q = \exp(-\pi)\bigr] = \frac{\sqrt[4]{5} - 1}{\sqrt[4]{5} + 1} = \sqrt[4]{5} \ominus 1 = \tan\bigl[\arctan(\sqrt[4]{5}\,) - \tfrac{1}{4}\pi \bigr]$$

That equation chain leads to this tangential sum:

$$R\bigl[\exp(-\pi)\bigr] = R\bigl[\exp(-2\pi)\bigr] \oplus \tan\bigl[\arctan(\sqrt[4]{5}\,) - \tfrac{1}{4}\pi \bigr]$$

And therefore following result appears:

$R\bigl[\exp(-\pi)\bigr] = \tan\bigl[\tfrac{1}{4}\arctan(2) + \arctan(\sqrt[4]{5}\,) - \tfrac{1}{4}\pi \bigr]$

In the next step we use the reflection theorem for the continued fraction R again:

$$R\bigl[\exp(-\pi)\bigr] \oplus R\bigl[\exp(-4\pi)\bigr] = \Phi^{-1}$$

$$R\bigl[\exp(-4\pi)\bigr] = \tan\bigl[\tfrac{1}{2}\arctan(2)\bigr] \ominus R\bigl[\exp(-\pi)\bigr]$$

And a further result appears:

$R\bigl[\exp(-4\pi)\bigr] = \tan\bigl[\tfrac{1}{4}\arctan(2) - \arctan(\sqrt[4]{5}\,) + \tfrac{1}{4}\pi \bigr]$

=== Derivation of Non-Lemniscatic values ===
The reflection theorem is now used for following values:

$$R\bigl[\exp(-\sqrt{2}\,\pi)\bigr] \oplus R\bigl[\exp(-2\sqrt{2}\,\pi)\bigr] = \Phi^{-1}$$

The Jacobi theta theorem leads to a further relation:

$$R\bigl[\exp(-\sqrt{2}\,\pi)\bigr] \ominus R\bigl[\exp(-2\sqrt{2}\,\pi)\bigr] = R(q) \ominus R(q^2) \bigl[q = \exp(-\sqrt{2}\,\pi)\bigr] =$$

$$= \frac{\vartheta_{01}(q)^2 - \vartheta_{01}(q^{1/5})^2}{5\,\vartheta_{01}(q^5)^2 - \vartheta_{01}(q)^2} \bigl[q = \exp(-\sqrt{2}\,\pi)\bigr] = \tan\bigl[2\arctan(\tfrac{1}{3}\sqrt{5} - \tfrac{1}{3}\sqrt[3]{6\sqrt{30} + 4\sqrt{5}} + \tfrac{1}{3}\sqrt[3]{6\sqrt{30} - 4\sqrt{5}}\,) - \tfrac{1}{4}\pi \bigr]$$

By tangential adding the now mentioned two theorems we get this result:

$$R\bigl[\exp(-\sqrt{2}\,\pi)\bigr] \oplus R\bigl[\exp(-\sqrt{2}\,\pi)\bigr] = \Phi^{-1} \oplus \tan\bigl[2\arctan(\tfrac{1}{3}\sqrt{5} - \tfrac{1}{3}\sqrt[3]{6\sqrt{30} + 4\sqrt{5}} + \tfrac{1}{3}\sqrt[3]{6\sqrt{30} - 4\sqrt{5}}\,) - \tfrac{1}{4}\pi \bigr]$$

$R\bigl[\exp(-\sqrt{2}\,\pi)\bigr] = \tan\bigl[\arctan(\tfrac{1}{3}\sqrt{5} - \tfrac{1}{3}\sqrt[3]{6\sqrt{30} + 4\sqrt{5}} + \tfrac{1}{3}\sqrt[3]{6\sqrt{30} - 4\sqrt{5}}\,) - \tfrac{1}{4}\arccot(2)\bigr]$

By tangential substraction that result appears:

$$R\bigl[\exp(-2\sqrt{2}\,\pi)\bigr] \oplus R\bigl[\exp(-2\sqrt{2}\,\pi)\bigr] = \Phi^{-1} \ominus \tan\bigl[2\arctan(\tfrac{1}{3}\sqrt{5} - \tfrac{1}{3}\sqrt[3]{6\sqrt{30} + 4\sqrt{5}} + \tfrac{1}{3}\sqrt[3]{6\sqrt{30} - 4\sqrt{5}}\,) - \tfrac{1}{4}\pi \bigr]$$

$R\bigl[\exp(-2\sqrt{2}\,\pi)\bigr] = \tan\bigl[\tfrac{1}{4}\arccot(- 2) - \arctan(\tfrac{1}{3}\sqrt{5} - \tfrac{1}{3}\sqrt[3]{6\sqrt{30} + 4\sqrt{5}} + \tfrac{1}{3}\sqrt[3]{6\sqrt{30} - 4\sqrt{5}}\,)\bigr]$

In an alternative solution way we use the theorem for the squared nome:

$$R\bigl[\exp(-\sqrt{2}\,\pi)\bigr]^2 R\bigl[\exp(-2\sqrt{2}\,\pi)\bigr]^{-1}\oplus R\bigl[\exp(-\sqrt{2}\,\pi)\bigr]R\bigl[\exp(-2\sqrt{2}\,\pi)\bigr]^2 = 1$$

$$\bigl\{R\bigl[\exp(-\sqrt{2}\,\pi)\bigr]^2 R\bigl[\exp(-2\sqrt{2}\,\pi)\bigr]^{-1} + 1\bigr\}\bigl\{R\bigl[\exp(-\sqrt{2}\,\pi)\bigr]R\bigl[\exp(-2\sqrt{2}\,\pi)\bigr]^2 + 1\bigr\} = 2$$

Now the reflection theorem is taken again:

$$R\bigl[\exp(-2\sqrt{2}\,\pi)\bigr] = \Phi^{-1} \ominus R\bigl[\exp(-\sqrt{2}\,\pi)\bigr]$$

$$R\bigl[\exp(-2\sqrt{2}\,\pi)\bigr] = \frac{1 - \Phi R\bigl[\exp(-\sqrt{2}\,\pi)\bigr]}{\Phi + R\bigl[\exp(-\sqrt{2}\,\pi)\bigr]}$$

The insertion of the last mentioned expression into the squared nome theorem gives that equation:

$$\biggl\{R\bigl[\exp(-\sqrt{2}\,\pi)\bigr]^2 \frac{\Phi + R\bigl[\exp(-\sqrt{2}\,\pi)\bigr]}{1 - \Phi R\bigl[\exp(-\sqrt{2}\,\pi)\bigr]} + 1\biggr\}\biggl\langle R\bigl[\exp(-\sqrt{2}\,\pi)\bigr] \frac{\bigl\{1 - \Phi R\bigl[\exp(-\sqrt{2}\,\pi)\bigr]\bigr\}^2}{\bigl\{\Phi + R\bigl[\exp(-\sqrt{2}\,\pi)\bigr]\bigr\}^2} + 1\biggr\rangle = 2$$

Erasing the denominators gives an equation of sixth degree:

$$R\bigl[\exp(-\sqrt{2}\,\pi)\bigr]^6 + 2\,\Phi^{-2} R\bigl[\exp(-\sqrt{2}\,\pi)\bigr]^5 - \sqrt{5}\,\Phi^{-1} R\bigl[\exp(-\sqrt{2}\,\pi)\bigr]^4 +$$

$$+ 2\,\sqrt{5}\,\Phi R\bigl[\exp(-\sqrt{2}\,\pi)\bigr]^3 + \sqrt{5}\,\Phi^{-1} R\bigl[\exp(-\sqrt{2}\,\pi)\bigr]^2 + 2\,\Phi^{-2} R\bigl[\exp(-\sqrt{2}\,\pi)\bigr] - 1 = 0$$

The solution of this equation is the already mentioned solution:

$$R\bigl[\exp(-\sqrt{2}\,\pi)\bigr] = \tan\bigl[\arctan(\tfrac{1}{3}\sqrt{5} - \tfrac{1}{3}\sqrt[3]{6\sqrt{30} + 4\sqrt{5}} + \tfrac{1}{3}\sqrt[3]{6\sqrt{30} - 4\sqrt{5}}\,) - \tfrac{1}{4}\arccot(2)\bigr]$$

== Relation to modular forms ==
$R(q)$ can be related to the Dedekind eta function, a modular form of weight 1/2, as,

$$\frac{1}{R(q)}-R(q) = \frac{\eta(\frac{\tau}{5})}{\eta(5\tau)}+1$$

$$\frac{1}{R^5(q)}-R^5(q) = \left[\frac{\eta(\tau)}{\eta(5\tau)}\right]^6+11$$

The Rogers-Ramanujan continued fraction can also be expressed in terms of the Jacobi theta functions. Recall the notation,

$$\begin{align}
\vartheta_{10}(0;\tau)&=\theta_2(q)=\sum_{n=-\infty}^\infty q^{(n+1/2)^2}\\
\vartheta_{00}(0;\tau)&=\theta_3(q)=\sum_{n=-\infty}^\infty q^{n^2}\\
\vartheta_{01}(0;\tau)&=\theta_4(q)=\sum_{n=-\infty}^\infty (-1)^n q^{n^2}
\end{align}$$

The notation $\theta_n$ is slightly easier to remember since $\theta_2^4+\theta_4^4 =\theta_3^4$, with even subscripts on the LHS. Thus,

$$R(x) = \tan\biggl\{\frac{1}{2}\arccot\biggl[\frac{1}{2} + \frac{\theta_{4}(x^{1/5})[5\,\theta_{4}(x^5)^2 - \theta_{4}(x)^2]}{2\,\theta_{4}(x^5)[\theta_{4}(x)^2 - \theta_{4}(x^{1/5})^2]}\biggr]\biggr\}$$
$$R(x) = \tan\biggl\{\frac{1}{2}\arccot\biggl[\frac{1}{2}+\bigg(\frac{\theta_2(x^{1/10})\,\theta_3(x^{1/10})\,\theta_4(x^{1/10})}{2^3\,\theta_2(x^{5/2})\,\theta_3(x^{5/2})\,\theta_4(x^{5/2})}\bigg)^{1/3}\biggr]\biggr\}$$
$$R(x) = \tan\biggl\{\frac{1}{2}\arctan\biggl[\frac{1}{2} - \frac{\theta_4(x)^2}{2\,\theta_4(x^5)^2}\biggr]\biggr\}^{1/5}\times\tan\biggl\{\frac{1}{2}\arccot\biggl[\frac{1}{2} - \frac{\theta_4(x)^2}{2\,\theta_4(x^5)^2}\biggr]\biggr\}^{2/5}$$
$$R(x) = \tan\biggl\{\frac{1}{2}\arctan\biggl[\frac{1}{2} - \frac{\theta_4(x^{1/2})^2}{2\,\theta_4(x^{5/2})^2}\biggr]\biggr\}^{2/5}\times\cot\biggl\{\frac{1}{2}\arccot\biggl[\frac{1}{2} - \frac{\theta_4(x^{1/2})^2}{2\,\theta_4(x^{5/2})^2}\biggr]\biggr\}^{1/5}$$

Note, however, that theta functions normally use the nome q = e^{iπτ}, while the Dedekind eta function uses the square of the nome q = e^{2iπτ}, thus the variable x has been employed instead to maintain consistency between all functions. For example, let $\tau = \sqrt{-1}$ so $x = e^{-\pi}$. Plugging this into the theta functions, one gets the same value for all three R(x) formulas which is the correct evaluation of the continued fraction given previously,

$$R\big(e^{-\pi}\big) = \frac{1}{2}\varphi\,(\sqrt{5}-\varphi^{3/2})(\sqrt[4]{5}+\varphi^{3/2}) = 0.511428\dots$$

One can also define the elliptic nome,

$$q(k) = \exp\big[-\pi K(\sqrt{1-k^2})/K(k)\big]$$

The small letter k describes the elliptic modulus and the big letter K describes the complete elliptic integral of the first kind. The continued fraction can then be also expressed by the Jacobi elliptic functions as follows:

$$R\big(q(k)\big) = \tan \biggl\{\frac{1}{2}\arctan y\biggr\}^{1/5} \tan \biggl\{\frac{1}{2}\arccot y \biggr\}^{2/5} =\left\{\frac{\sqrt{y^2+1}-1}{y}\right\}^{1/5} \left\{y\left[\sqrt{\frac{1}{y^2}+1}-1\right]\right\}^{2/5}$$

with

$$y=\frac{2k^2\,\text{sn}[\tfrac{2}{5}K(k);k]^2\,\text{sn}[\tfrac{4}{5}K(k);k]^2}{5-k^2\,\text{sn}[\tfrac{2}{5}K(k);k]^2\,\text{sn}[\tfrac{4}{5}K(k);k]^2}.$$

== Relation to j-function ==
One formula involving the j-function and the Dedekind eta function is this:

$$j(\tau) = \frac{(x^2+10x+5)^3}{x}$$

where $x = \left[\frac{\sqrt{5}\,\eta(5\tau)}{\eta(\tau)}\right]^6.\,$ Since also,

$$\frac{1}{R^5(q)}-R^5(q) = \left[\frac{\eta(\tau)}{\eta(5\tau)}\right]^6+11$$

Eliminating the eta quotient $x$ between the two equations, one can then express j(τ) in terms of $r =R(q)$ as,

$$\begin{align}
& j(\tau) = -\frac{(r^{20}-228r^{15}+494r^{10}+228r^5+1)^3}{r^5(r^{10}+11r^5-1)^5} \\[6pt]
& j(\tau)-1728 = -\frac{(r^{30}+ 522r^{25}- 10005 r^{20}- 10005 r^{10}- 522 r^5 + 1)^2}{r^5(r^{10}+ 11 r^5-1)^5}
\end{align}$$

where the numerator and denominator are polynomial invariants of the icosahedron. Using the modular equation between $R(q)$ and $R(q^5)$, one finds that,

$$\begin{align}
& j(5\tau) = -\frac{(r^{20}+12r^{15}+14r^{10}-12r^5+1)^3}{r^{25}(r^{10}+11r^5-1)} \\[6pt]
& j(5\tau)-1728 = -\frac{(r^{30}+18r^{25}+75r^{20}+75r^{10}-18r^5+1)^2}{r^{25}(r^{10}+11r^5-1)}
\end{align}$$

Let $z=r^5-\frac{1}{r^5}$, then $j(5\tau) = -\frac{ \left( z^2 + 12z + 16 \right)^3}{z+11}$

where

$$\begin{align}
& z_\infty = -\left[\frac{\sqrt{5}\,\eta(25\tau)}{\eta(5\tau)}\right]^6-11,\ z_0=-\left[ \frac{\eta(\tau)}{\eta(5\tau)} \right]^6-11,\ z_1=\left[\frac{\eta(\frac{5\tau+2}{5})}{\eta(5\tau)}\right]^6-11, \\[6pt]
& z_2=-\left[\frac{\eta(\frac{5\tau+4}{5})}{\eta(5\tau)}\right]^6-11,\  z_3=\left[\frac{\eta(\frac{5\tau+6}{5})}{\eta(5\tau)}\right]^6-11,\ z_4=-\left[ \frac{\eta(\frac{5\tau+8}{5})}{\eta(5\tau)}\right]^6-11
\end{align}$$

which in fact is the j-invariant of the elliptic curve,

$$y^2+(1+r^5)xy+r^5y=x^3+r^5x^2$$

parameterized by the non-cusp points of the modular curve $X_1(5)$.

== Functional equation ==
For convenience, one can also use the notation $r(\tau) = R(q)$ when q = e^{2πiτ}. While other modular functions like the j-invariant satisfies,

$$j(-\tfrac{1}{\tau}) = j(\tau)$$

and the Dedekind eta function has,

$$\eta(-\tfrac{1}{\tau}) =\sqrt{-i\tau}\, \eta(\tau)$$

the functional equation of the Rogers–Ramanujan continued fraction involves the golden ratio $\varphi$,

$$r(-\tfrac{1}{\tau}) = \frac{1-\varphi\,r(\tau)}{\varphi+r(\tau)}$$

Incidentally,

$$r(\tfrac{7+i}{10}) = i$$

== Modular equations ==
There are modular equations between $R(q)$ and $R(q^n)$. Elegant ones for small prime n are as follows.

For $n = 2$, let $u=R(q)$ and $v=R(q^2)$, then $v-u^2 = (v+u^2)uv^2.$

For $n = 3$, let $u=R(q)$ and $v=R(q^3)$, then $(v-u^3)(1+uv^3) = 3u^2v^2.$

For $n = 5$, let $u=R(q)$ and $v=R(q^5)$, then $v(v^4-3v^3+4v^2-2v+1)=(v^4+2v^3+4v^2+3v+1)u^5.$

Or equivalently for $n = 5$, let $u=R(q)$ and $v=R(q^5)$ and $\varphi=\tfrac{1+\sqrt5}2$, then $u^5 = \frac{v\,(v^2-\varphi^2v+\varphi^2)(v^2-\varphi^{-2}v+\varphi^{-2})}{(v^2+v+\varphi^2)(v^2+v+\varphi^{-2})}.$

For $n = 11$, let $u=R(q)$ and $v=R(q^{11})$, then $uv(u^{10}+11u^5-1)(v^{10}+11v^5-1) = (u-v)^{12}.$

Regarding $n = 5$, note that $v^{10}+11v^5-1=(v^2+v-1)(v^4-3v^3+4v^2-2v+1)(v^4+2v^3+4v^2+3v+1).$

== Other results ==
Ramanujan found many other interesting results regarding $R(q)$. Let $a,b\in\mathbb{R}^+$, and $\varphi$ as the golden ratio.

If $ab=\pi^2$ then,

$$\bigl[R(e^{-2a})+\varphi\bigl]\bigl[R(e^{-2b})+\varphi\bigr]=\sqrt{5}\,\varphi.$$

If $5ab=\pi^2$ then,

$$\bigl[R^5(e^{-2a})+\varphi^5\bigl]\bigl[R^5(e^{-2b})+\varphi^5\bigr]=5\sqrt{5}\,\varphi^5.$$

The powers of $R(q)$ also can be expressed in unusual ways. For its cube,

$$R^3(q) = \frac{\alpha}{\beta}$$

where

$$\alpha=\sum_{n=0}^\infty\frac{q^{2n}}{1-q^{5n+2}}-\sum_{n=0}^\infty \frac{q^{3n+1}}{1-q^{5n+3}},$$
$$\beta=\sum_{n=0}^\infty\frac{q^n}{1-q^{5n+1}}-\sum_{n=0}^\infty \frac{q^{4n+3}}{1-q^{5n+4}}.$$

For its fifth power, let $w=R(q)R^2(q^2)$, then,

$$R^5(q) = w\left(\frac{1-w}{1+w}\right)^2,\;\; R^5(q^2) = w^2\left(\frac{1+w}{1-w} \right)$$

== Quintic equations ==
The general quintic equation in Bring-Jerrard form:

$$x^5 - 5x - 4a = 0$$

for every real value $a > 1$ can be solved in terms of Rogers-Ramanujan continued fraction $R(q)$ and the elliptic nome

$$q(k) = \exp\big[-\pi K(\sqrt{1-k^2})/K(k)\big].$$

To solve this quintic, the elliptic modulus must first be determined as

$$k = \tan[\tfrac{1}{4}\pi - \tfrac{1}{4}\arccsc(a^2)].$$

Then the real solution is

$$\begin{align}x&= \frac{2 - \bigl\{1 - R[q(k)]\bigr\}\bigl\{1+R[q(k)^2]\bigr\}}{\sqrt{R[q(k)]\,R[q(k)^2]}\,\sqrt[4]{4\cot\langle 4\arctan\{S\}\rangle - 3}}\\&= \frac{2 - \bigl\{1 - R[q(k)]\bigr\}\bigl\{1+R[q(k)^2]\bigr\}}{\sqrt{R[q(k)]R[q(k)^2]}\,\sqrt[4]{\frac{2}{S-1}+\frac{2}{S+1}+\frac{1}{S}-S-3}}. \end{align}$$

where $S=R[q(k)]\,R^2[q(k)^2].$. Recall in the previous section the 5th power of $R(q)$ can be expressed by $S$:

$$R^5[q(k)] = S\left(\frac{1-S}{1+S}\right)^2$$

=== Example 1 ===
$$x^5 - x - 1 = 0$$

Transform to,

$$(\sqrt[4]{5}x)^5 - 5(\sqrt[4]{5}x) - 4(\tfrac{5}{4}\sqrt[4]{5}) = 0$$

thus,

$$a = \tfrac{5}{4}\sqrt[4]{5}$$

$$k = \tan[\tfrac{1}{4}\pi - \tfrac{1}{4}\arccsc(a^2)] = \tfrac{5^{5/4}+\sqrt{25\sqrt{5}-16}}{5^{5/4}+\sqrt{25\sqrt{5}+16}}$$

$$q(k) = 0.0851414716\dots$$

$$R[q(k)] = 0.5633613184\dots$$

$$R[q(k)^2] = 0.3706122329\dots$$

and the solution is:

$$x = \frac{2 - \bigl\{1 - R[q(k)]\bigr\}\bigl\{1+R[q(k)^2]\bigr\}}{\sqrt{R[q(k)]\,R[q(k)^2]}\,\sqrt[4]{20\cot\langle 4\arctan\{R[q(k)]\,R[q(k)^2]^2\}\rangle - 15}} = 1.167303978\dots$$

and can not be represented by elementary root expressions.

=== Example 2 ===
$$x^5 - 5x - 4\Bigl(\sqrt[4]{\tfrac{81}{32}}\Bigr) = 0$$

thus,

$$a = \sqrt[4]{\tfrac{81}{32}}$$

Given the more familiar continued fractions with closed-forms,

$$r_1 = R\big(e^{-\pi}\big) = \tfrac{1}{2}\varphi\,(\sqrt{5}-\varphi^{3/2})(\sqrt[4]{5}+\varphi^{3/2}) = 0.511428\dots$$

$$r_2 = R\big(e^{-2\pi}\big) = \sqrt[4]{5}\,\varphi^{1/2}-\varphi = 0.284079\dots$$

$$r_4 = R\big(e^{-4\pi}\big) = \tfrac{1}{2}\varphi\,(\sqrt{5}-\varphi^{3/2})(-\sqrt[4]{5}+\varphi^{3/2}) = 0.081002\dots$$

with golden ratio $\varphi = \tfrac{1+\sqrt5}{2}$ and the solution simplifies to

$$\begin{align}x
&= \sqrt[4]{5}\,\frac{2 - \bigl\{1 - r_1\bigr\}\bigl\{1+r_2\bigr\}}{\sqrt{r_1\,r_2}\,\sqrt[4]{20\cot\langle 4\arctan\{r_1\,r_2^2\}\rangle - 15}}\\[6pt]
&= \sqrt[4]{5}\,\frac{2 - \bigl\{1 - r_2\bigr\}\bigl\{1+r_4\bigr\}}{\sqrt{r_2\,r_4}\,\sqrt[4]{20\cot\langle 4\arctan\{r_2\,r_4^2\}\rangle - 15}}\\[6pt]
&= \sqrt[4]{8} = 1.681792\dots\end{align}$$
