= Rogers–Ramanujan identities =

Mathematical identities related to integer partitions

In mathematics, the Rogers–Ramanujan identities are two identities related to basic hypergeometric series and integer partitions. The identities were first discovered and proved by Leonard James Rogers (1894), and were subsequently rediscovered (without a proof) by Srinivasa Ramanujan some time before 1913. Ramanujan had no proof, but rediscovered Rogers's paper in 1917, and they then published a joint new proof (Rogers & Ramanujan 1919). Issai Schur (1917) independently rediscovered and proved the identities.

== Definition ==
The Rogers–Ramanujan identities are

$G(q) = \sum_{n=0}^\infty \frac {q^{n^2}} {(q;q)_n} = \frac {1}{(q;q^5)_\infty (q^4; q^5)_\infty} =1+ q +q^2 +q^3 +2q^4+2q^5 +3q^6+\cdots$ (sequence A003114 in the OEIS)

and

$H(q) =\sum_{n=0}^\infty \frac {q^{n^2+n}} {(q;q)_n} = \frac {1}{(q^2;q^5)_\infty (q^3; q^5)_\infty} =1+q^2 +q^3 +q^4+q^5 +2q^6+\cdots$ (sequence A003106 in the OEIS).

Here, $(a;q)_n$ denotes the q-Pochhammer symbol.

== Combinatorial interpretation ==
Consider the following:

- $\frac {q^{n^2}} {(q;q)_n}$ is the generating function for partitions with exactly $n$ parts such that adjacent parts have difference at least 2.
- $\frac {1}{(q;q^5)_\infty (q^4; q^5)_\infty}$ is the generating function for partitions such that each part is congruent to either 1 or 4 modulo 5.
- $\frac {q^{n^2+n}} {(q;q)_n}$ is the generating function for partitions with exactly $n$ parts such that adjacent parts have difference at least 2 and such that the smallest part is at least 2.
- $\frac {1}{(q^2;q^5)_\infty (q^3; q^5)_\infty}$ is the generating function for partitions such that each part is congruent to either 2 or 3 modulo 5.

The Rogers–Ramanujan identities could be now interpreted in the following way. Let $n$ be a non-negative integer.

1. The number of partitions of $n$ such that the adjacent parts differ by at least 2 is the same as the number of partitions of $n$ such that each part is congruent to either 1 or 4 modulo 5.
2. The number of partitions of $n$ such that the adjacent parts differ by at least 2 and such that the smallest part is at least 2 is the same as the number of partitions of $n$ such that each part is congruent to either 2 or 3 modulo 5.

Alternatively,

1. The number of partitions of $n$ such that with $k$ parts the smallest part is at least $k$ is the same as the number of partitions of $n$ such that each part is congruent to either 1 or 4 modulo 5.
2. The number of partitions of $n$ such that with $k$ parts the smallest part is at least $k+1$ is the same as the number of partitions of $n$ such that each part is congruent to either 2 or 3 modulo 5.

== Application to partitions ==
Since the terms occurring in the identity are generating functions of certain partitions, the identities make statements about partitions (decompositions) of natural numbers. The number sequences resulting from the coefficients of the Maclaurin series of the Rogers–Ramanujan functions G and H are special partition number sequences of level 5:

$$G(x) =
\frac{1}{(x;x^5)_{\infty} (x^4; x^5)_{\infty}}
= 1 + \sum_{n = 1}^{\infty}P_{G}(n)x^{n}$$
$$H(x) =
\frac{1}{(x^2;x^5)_{\infty} (x^3; x^5)_{\infty}}
= 1 + \sum_{n = 1}^{\infty}P_{H}(n)x^{n}$$

The number sequence $P_{G}(n)$ (sequence A003114 in the OEIS)) represents the number of possibilities for the affected natural number n to decompose this number into summands of the patterns 5a + 1 or 5a + 4 with a ∈ $\mathbb{N}_0$. Thus $P_{G}(n)$ gives the number of decays of an integer n in which adjacent parts of the partition differ by at least 2, equal to the number of decays in which each part is equal to 1 or 4 mod 5 is.

And the number sequence $P_{H}(n)$ (sequence A003106 in the OEIS)) analogously represents the number of possibilities for the affected natural number n to decompose this number into summands of the patterns 5a + 2 or 5a + 3 with a ∈ $\mathbb{N}_0$. Thus $P_{H}(n)$ gives the number of decays of an integer n in which adjacent parts of the partition differ by at least 2 and in which the smallest part is greater than or equal to 2 is equal the number of decays whose parts are equal to 2 or 3 mod 5. This will be illustrated as examples in the following two tables:

Partition number sequence $P_{G}(n)$
| Natural number n | $P_{G}(n)$ | Sum representations with the described criteria |
|---|---|---|
| 1 | 1 | 1 |
| 2 | 1 | 1+1 |
| 3 | 1 | 1+1+1 |
| 4 | 2 | 4, 1+1+1+1 |
| 5 | 2 | 4+1, 1+1+1+1+1 |
| 6 | 3 | 6, 4+1+1, 1+1+1+1+1+1 |
| 7 | 3 | 6+1, 4+1+1+1, 1+1+1+1+1+1+1 |
| 8 | 4 | 6+1+1, 4+4, 4+1+1+1+1, 1+1+1+1+1+1+1+1 |
| 9 | 5 | 9, 6+1+1+1, 4+4+1, 4+1+1+1+1+1, 1+1+1+1+1+1+1+1+1 |
| 10 | 6 | 9+1, 6+4, 6+1+1+1+1, 4+4+1+1, 4+1+1+1+1+1+1, 1+1+1+1+1+1+1+1+1+1 |
| 11 | 7 | 11, 9+1+1, 6+4+1, 6+1+1+1+1+1, 4+4+1+1+1, 4+1+1+1+1+1+1+1, 1+1+1+1+1+1+1+1+1+1+1 |
| 12 | 9 | 11+1, 9+1+1+1, 6+6, 6+4+1+1, 6+1+1+1+1+1+1, 4+4+4, 4+4+1+1+1+1, 4+1+1+1+1+1+1+1+1, 1+1+1+1+1+1+1+1+1+1+1+1 |
| 13 | 10 | 11+1+1, 9+4, 9+1+1+1+1, 6+6+1, 6+4+1+1+1, 6+1+1+1+1+1+1+1, 4+4+4+1, 4+4+1+1+1+1+1, 4+1+1+1+1+1+1+1+1+1, 1+1+1+1+1+1+1+1+1+1+1+1+1 |
| 14 | 12 | 14, 11+1+1+1, 9+4+1, 9+1+1+1+1+1, 6+6+1+1, 6+4+4, 6+4+1+1+1+1, 6+1+1+1+1+1+1+1+1, 4+4+4+1+1, 4+4+1+1+1+1+1+1, 4+1+1+1+1+1+1+1+1+1+1, 1+1+1+1+1+1+1+1+1+1+1+1+1+1 |
| 15 | 14 | 14+1, 11+4, 11+1+1+1+1, 9+6, 9+4+1+1, 9+1+1+1+1+1+1, 6+6+1+1+1, 6+4+4+1, 6+4+1+1+1+1+1, 6+1+1+1+1+1+1+1+1+1, 4+4+4+1+1+1, 4+4+1+1+1+1+1+1+1, 4+1+1+1+1+1+1+1+1+1+1+1, 1+1+1+1+1+1+1+1+1+1+1+1+1+1+1 |
| 16 | 17 | 16, 14+1+1, 11+4+1, 11+1+1+1+1+1, 9+6+1, 9+4+1+1+1, 9+1+1+1+1+1+1+1, 6+6+4, 6+6+1+1+1+1, 6+4+4+1+1, 6+4+1+1+1+1+1+1, 6+1+1+1+1+1+1+1+1+1+1, 4+4+4+4, 4+4+4+1+1+1+1, 4+4+1+1+1+1+1+1+1+1, 4+1+1+1+1+1+1+1+1+1+1+1+1, 1+1+1+1+1+1+1+1+1+1+1+1+1+1+1+1 |

Partition number sequence $P_{H}(n)$
| Natural number n | $P_{H}(n)$ | Sum representations with the described criteria |
|---|---|---|
| 1 | 0 | none |
| 2 | 1 | 2 |
| 3 | 1 | 3 |
| 4 | 1 | 2+2 |
| 5 | 1 | 3+2 |
| 6 | 2 | 3+3, 2+2+2 |
| 7 | 2 | 7, 3+2+2 |
| 8 | 3 | 8, 3+3+2, 2+2+2+2 |
| 9 | 3 | 7+2, 3+3+3, 3+2+2+2 |
| 10 | 4 | 8+2, 7+3, 3+3+2+2, 2+2+2+2+2 |

== Rogers–Ramanujan continued fractions R and S ==
=== Definition of the continued fractions ===
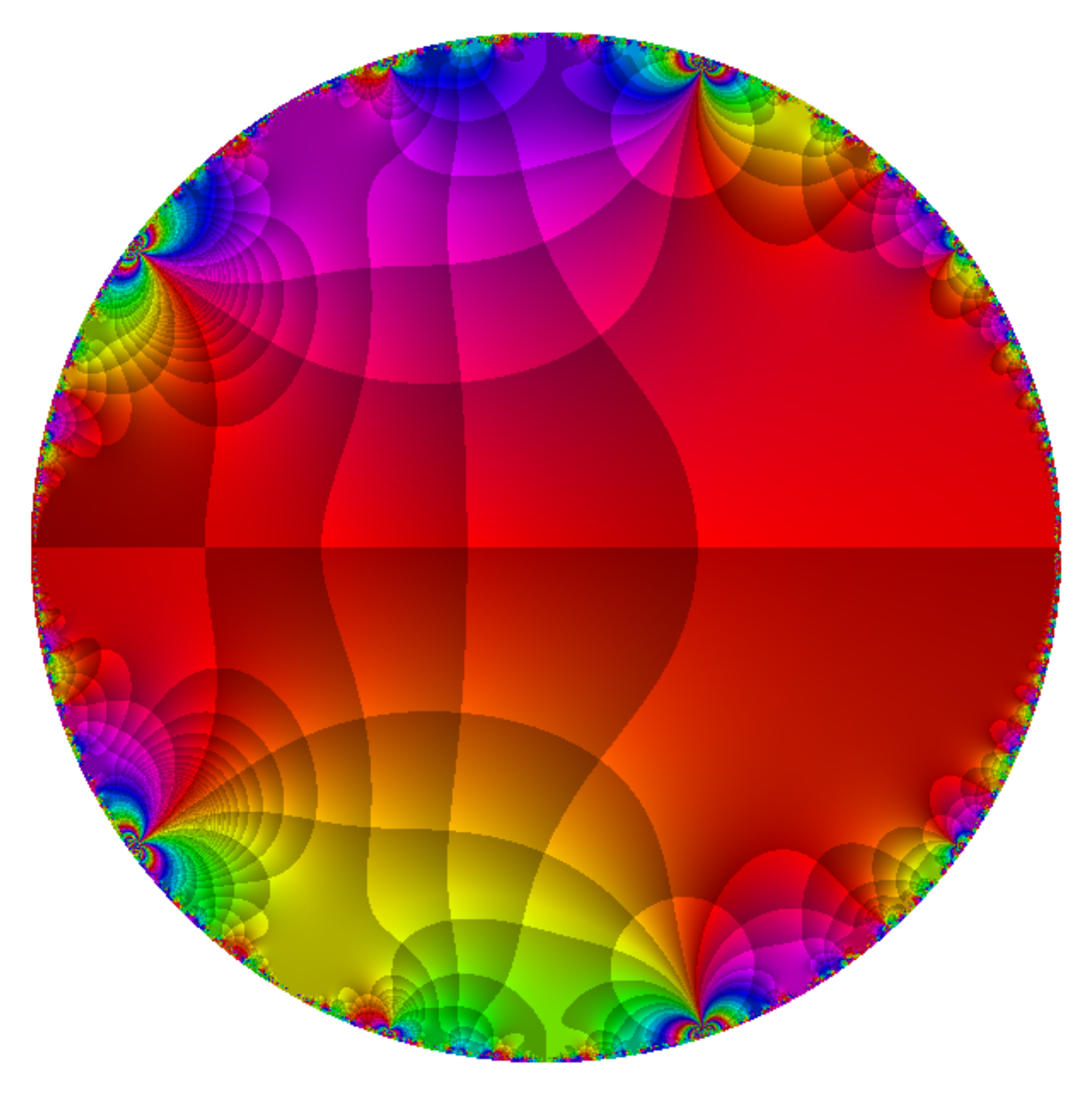
Domain coloring representation of the convergent $A_{400}(q)/B_{400}(q)$ of the function $q^{-1/5}R(q)$, where $R(q)$ is the Rogers–Ramanujan continued fraction.

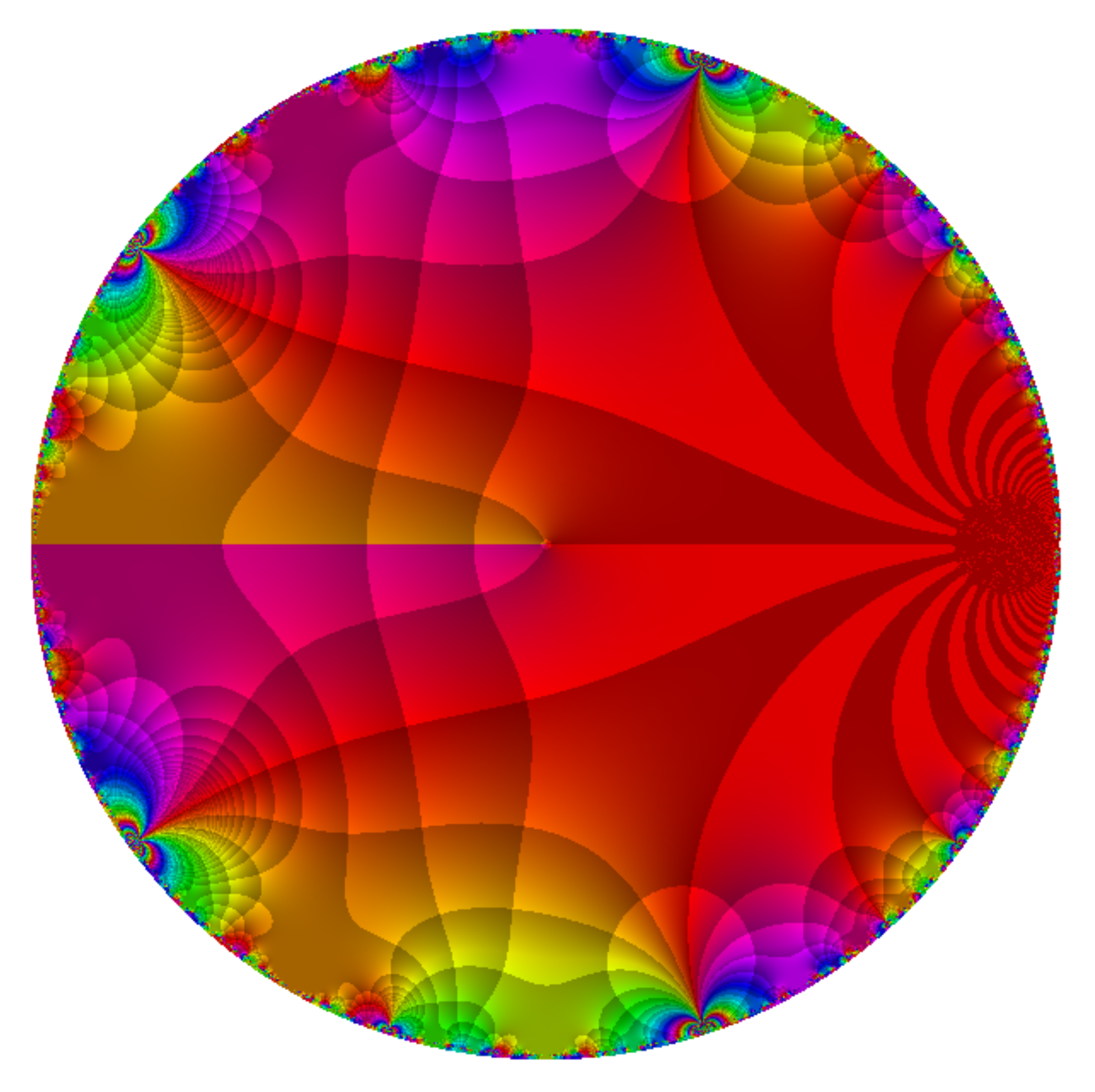
Representation of the approximation $q^{1/5}A_{400}(q)/B_{400}(q)$ of the Rogers–Ramanujan continued fraction.

The following continued fraction $R(q)$ is called Rogers–Ramanujan continued fraction, Continuing fraction $S(q)$ is called alternating Rogers–Ramanujan continued fraction!

| Standardized continued fraction | Alternating continued fraction |
|---|---|
| $R(q) = q^{1/5} \left[ 1+\frac{q}{1+\frac{q^2}{1+\frac{q^3}{1+\cdots }}} \right]$ | $S(q) = q^{1/5} \left[ 1-\frac{q}{1+\frac{q^2}{1-\frac{q^3}{1+\cdots }}} \right]$ |

The factor $q^{\frac {1}{5}}$ creates a quotient of module functions and it also makes these shown continued fractions modular:

This definition applies for the continued fraction mentioned:

$$R (q) = q^{1/5}\frac{(q;q^5)_{\infty} (q^4;q^5)_{\infty}}{(q^2;q^5)_{\infty} (q^3;q^5)_{\infty}}$$

$$R (q) = q^{1/5}\prod_{k=0}^{\infty} \frac { (1- q^{5k+1}) (1- q^{5k+ 4})}{(1- q^{5k+2})(1- q^{5k+3})} = q^{1/5}\frac{H(q)}{G(q)}$$

This is the definition of the Ramanujan theta function:

$$f (a,b)= \sum_{k=-\infty}^{\infty} a^{\frac {k (k+1)}{2}} b^{\frac {k ( k-1)}{2}}$$

With this function, the continued fraction R can be created this way:

$$R(q) = q^{1/5}\frac { f (-q, -q^4) }{f (-q^2, -q^3 ) }$$.

The connection between the continued fraction and the Rogers–Ramanujan functions was already found by Rogers in 1894 (and later independently by Ramanujan).

The continued fraction can also be expressed by the Dedekind eta function:

$$R(q) = \tan\biggl\{\frac{1}{2}\arccot\biggl[\frac{\eta_{W}(q^{1/5})}{2\eta_ {W}(q^{5})} + \frac{1}{2}\biggr]\biggr\}$$

The alternating continued fraction $S(q)$ has the following identities to the remaining Rogers–Ramanujan functions and to the Ramanujan theta function described above:

$$S(q) = q^{1/5} \frac{H(-q)}{G(-q)}$$
$$S(q) = q^{1/5}\frac { f (q, -q^4) }{f (-q^2, q^3 ) }$$
$$S(q) = \frac{R(q^4)}{R(q)R(q^2)}$$
$$S(q) = q^{1/5}\frac{G(q)G(q^2)H(q^4)}{H(q)H(q^2)G(q ^4)}$$

=== Identities with Jacobi theta functions ===
The following definitions are valid for the Jacobi "Theta-Nullwert" functions:

$$\vartheta_{00}(x) = 1 + 2\sum_{n = 1}^{\infty} x^{n^2}$$
$$\vartheta_{01}(x) = 1 - 2\sum_{n = 1}^{\infty} (-1)^{n + 1} x^{n^2}$$
$$\vartheta_{10}(x) = 2x^{1/4} + 2x^{1/4}\sum_{n = 1}^{\infty} x^{n^2+n}$$

And the following product definitions are identical to the total definitions mentioned:

$$\vartheta_{00}(x) = \prod_{n = 1}^{\infty} (1-x^{2n})(1+x^{2n-1})^2$$
$$\vartheta_{01}(x) = \prod_{n = 1}^{\infty} (1-x^{2n})(1-x^{2n-1})^2$$
$$\vartheta_{10}(x) = 2x^{1/4}\prod_{n = 1}^{\infty} (1-x^{2n})(1+x^{2n}) ^2$$

These three so-called theta zero value functions are linked to each other using the Jacobian identity:

$$\vartheta _{00}(x)^4 = \vartheta _{10}(x)^4 + \vartheta _{01}(x)^4$$

The mathematicians Edmund Taylor Whittaker and George Neville Watson discovered these definitional identities.

The Rogers–Ramanujan continued fraction functions $R(x)$ and $S(x)$ have these relationships to the theta Nullwert functions:

$$R(x) = \tan\biggl\langle\frac{1}{2}\arccot\biggl\{\frac{\vartheta_{01}(x^{1/5})[5\, \vartheta _{01}(x^5)^2 - \vartheta _{01}(x)^2]}{2\,\vartheta _{01}(x^5)[\vartheta _{01}(x)^2 - \vartheta_{01}(x^{1/5})^2]} + \frac{1}{2}\biggr\}\biggr\rangle$$
$$S(x) = \tan\biggl\langle\frac{1}{2}\arccot\biggl\{\frac{\vartheta_{00}(x^{1/5})[5\, \vartheta _{00}(x^5)^2 - \vartheta _{00}(x)^2]}{2\,\vartheta _{00}(x^5)[\vartheta _{00}(x^{1 /5})^2 - \vartheta_{00}(x)^2]} - \frac{1}{2}\biggr\}\biggr\rangle$$

The element of the fifth root can also be removed from the elliptic nome of the theta functions and transferred to the external tangent function. In this way, a formula can be created that only requires one of the three main theta functions:

$$R(x) = \tan\biggl\{\frac{1}{2}\arctan\biggl[\frac{1}{2} - \frac{\vartheta_{01}(x)^2}{2\vartheta_{01}(x^5)^2}\biggr]\biggr\}^{1/5}\tan\biggl\{\frac{1}{2}\arccot\biggl[\frac{1}{2} - \frac{\vartheta_{01}(x)^2}{2\vartheta_{01}(x^5)^2}\biggr]\biggr\}^{2/5}$$
$$S(x) = \tan\biggl\{\frac{1}{2}\arctan\biggl[\frac{\vartheta_{00}(x)^2}{2\vartheta_{00}(x^5)^2} - \frac{1}{2}\biggr]\biggr\}^{1/5} \cot\biggl\{\frac{1}{2}\arccot\biggl[\frac{\vartheta_{00}(x)^2}{2\vartheta_{00}(x^5)^2} - \frac{1}{2}\biggr]\biggr\}^{2/5}$$

== Modular modified functions of G and H ==
=== Definition of the modular form of G and H ===
An elliptic function is a modular function if this function in dependence on the elliptic nome as an internal variable function results in a function, which also results as an algebraic combination of Legendre's elliptic modulus and its complete elliptic integrals of the first kind in the K and K' form. The Legendre's elliptic modulus is the numerical eccentricity of the corresponding ellipse.

If you set $q=e^{2 \pi i \tau}$ (where the imaginary part of $\tau \in \mathbb C$ is positive), following two functions are modular functions!

$$G_{M}(q) = q^{ \frac {-1}{60}} G(q)$$

$$H_{M}(q) = q^{\frac {11}{60}} H(q)$$

If q = e^{2πiτ}, then q^{−1/60}G(q) and q^{11/60}H(q) are modular functions of τ.

For the Rogers–Ramanujan continued fraction R(q) this formula is valid based on the described modular modifications of G and H:

$$R(q) = \frac{H_{M}(q)}{G_{M}(q)}$$

=== Special values ===
These functions have the following values for the reciprocal of Gelfond's constant and for the square of this reciprocal:

$$\begin{align}
G_{M}\bigl[\exp(-\pi)\bigr] & = 2^{-1/2} 5^{-1/4} (\sqrt{5} - 1)^{1 /4} (\sqrt[4]{5} + 1)^{1/2} R\bigl[\exp(-\pi)\bigr]^{-1/2} =
\\[4pt]
& = 2^{1/4} \,5^{-1/8} \,\Phi^{1/2} \,{\color{blue}\cos\bigl[\tfrac{1}{4}\arctan(2) + \tfrac{1}{2}\arcsin(\Phi^{-2})\bigr]}
\end{align}$$

$$\begin{align}
H_{M}\bigl[\exp(-\pi)\bigr] & = 2^{-1/2} 5^{-1/4} (\sqrt{5} - 1)^{1 /4} (\sqrt[4]{5} + 1)^{1/2} R\bigl[\exp(-\pi)\bigr]^{1/2} =
\\[4pt]
& = 2^{1/4} \,5^{-1/8} \,\Phi^{1/2} \,{\color{blue}\sin\bigl[\tfrac{1}{4}\arctan(2) + \tfrac{1}{2}\arcsin(\Phi^{-2})\bigr]}
\end{align}$$

$$\begin{align}
G_{M}\bigl[\exp(-2\pi)\bigr] & = 10^{-1/4} (\sqrt{5} - 1)^{1/4} R\bigl[ \exp(-2\pi)\bigr]^{-1/2} = \\[4pt]
& = 2^{1/2} \,5^{-1/8} \,{\color{blue}\cos\bigl[\tfrac{1}{4}\arctan(2)\bigr]}
\end{align}$$

$$\begin{align}
H_{M}\bigl[\exp(-2\pi)\bigr] & = 10^{-1/4} (\sqrt{5} - 1)^{1/4} R\bigl[ \exp(-2\pi)\bigr]^{1/2} = \\[4pt]
& = 2^{1/2} \,5^{-1/8} \,{\color{blue}\sin\bigl[\tfrac{1}{4}\arctan(2)\bigr]}
\end{align}$$

The Rogers–Ramanujan continued fraction takes the following ordinate values for these abscissa values:

$$\begin{align}
R[\exp(-\pi)] {} & = \tfrac{1}{4}(\sqrt{5}+1)(\sqrt{5}-\sqrt{\sqrt{5}+2}) (\sqrt{\sqrt{5}+2}+\sqrt[4]{5}) = \\[4pt]
& {} = \Phi^{3/2}\operatorname{cl}(\tfrac{1}{5}\varpi)^{-3/2} \operatorname{cl}(\tfrac{2}{5} \varpi)^{3/2} \operatorname{cl}(\tfrac{1}{10}\varpi)^2 \operatorname{cl}(\tfrac{3}{10}\varpi) \operatorname{slh} (\tfrac{2}{5}\sqrt{2}\,\varpi) = \\[4pt ]
& {} = {\color{blue}\tan\bigl[\tfrac{1}{4}\arctan(2) + \tfrac{1}{2}\arcsin(\Phi^{-2})\bigr]} \\[4pt]
\end{align}$$

$$\begin{align}
R[\exp(-2\pi)] {} & = 4\sin(\tfrac{1}{20}\pi)\sin(\tfrac{3}{20}\pi) = \\[4pt]
& {} = {\color{blue}\tan\bigl[\tfrac{1}{4}\arctan(2)\bigr]}
\end{align}$$

== Dedekind eta function identities ==
=== Derivation by the geometric mean ===
Given are the mentioned definitions of $G_{M}$ and $H_{M}$ in this already mentioned way:

$$G_{M}(q) = q^{\frac{-1}{60}} \frac{1}{(q;q^5)_{\infty} (q^4;q^5)_{\infty}}$$

$$H_{M}(q) = q^{\frac{11}{60}} \frac{1}{(q^2;q^5)_{\infty} (q^3;q^5)_{\infty}}$$

The Dedekind eta function identities for the functions G and H result by combining only the following two equation chains:

The quotient is the Rogers Ramanujan continued fraction accurately:

$$H_{M}(q) \div G_{M}(q) = R(q)$$

But the product leads to a simplified combination of Pochhammer operators:

$$H_{M}(q) \,G_{M}(q) = q^{1/6} \frac{1}{(q;q^5)_{\infty} (q^4;q^5)_{\infty} (q^2;q^5)_{\infty} (q^3;q^5)_{\infty}} =$$

$$= q^{1/6} \frac{(q^5;q^5)_{\infty}}{(q;q)_{\infty}} = \frac{\eta_{W}(q^5)}{\eta_{W}(q)}$$

The geometric mean of these two equation chains directly lead to following expressions in dependence of the Dedekind eta function in their Weber form:

$$G_{M}(q) = \eta_{W}(q^5)^{1/2} \eta_{W}(q)^{-1/2} R(q)^{- 1/2}$$

$$H_{M}(q) = \eta_{W}(q^5)^{1/2} \eta_{W}(q)^{-1/2} R(q)^{1 /2}$$

In this way the modulated functions $G_{M}$ and $H_{M}$ are represented directly using only the continued fraction R and the Dedekind eta function quotient!

With the Pochhammer products alone, the following identity then applies to the non-modulated functions G and H:

$$G(q) =(q;q^5)_{\infty}^{-1} (q^4;q^5)_{\infty}^{-1} = (q^5 ;q^5)_{\infty}^{1/2} (q;q)_{\infty}^{-1/2} \biggl[\frac{H(q)}{G(q)} \biggr]^{-1/2}$$

$$H(q) = (q^2;q^5)_{\infty}^{-1} (q^3;q^5)_{\infty}^{-1} = (q ^5;q^5)_{\infty}^{1/2} (q;q)_{\infty}^{-1/2} \biggl[\frac{H(q)}{G(q )}\biggr]^{1/2}$$

=== Pentagonal number theorem ===
For the Dedekind eta function according to Weber's definition these formulas apply:

$$\eta_{W}(x)= 2^{-1/6}\vartheta_{10}(x)^{1/6}\vartheta_{00}(x)^{1/6}\vartheta_{01}(x)^{2/3}$$
$$\eta_{W}(x)= 2^{-1/3}\vartheta_{10}(x^{1/2})^{1/3}\vartheta_{00}(x^{ 1/2})^{1/3}\vartheta_{01}(x^{1/2})^{1/3}$$
$$\eta_{W}(x)= x^{1/24} \prod_{n=1}^{\infty} (1-x^n) = x^{1/24}(x; x)_{\infty}$$
$$\eta_{W}(x)= x^{1/24} \biggl\{1 + \sum_{n = 1}^{\infty} \bigl[- x^{\text{Fn} (2n-1)} - x^{\text{Kr}(2n-1)} + x^{\text{Fn}(2n)} + x^{\text{Kr}(2n)}\bigr] \biggr\}$$
$$\eta_{W}(x)= x^{1/24} \biggl\{1 + \sum_{n = 1}^{\infty} \mathrm{P}(n) \,x^{n} \biggr\}^{-1}$$

The fourth formula describes the pentagonal number theorem because of the exponents!

These basic definitions apply to the pentagonal numbers and the card house numbers:

$$\text{Fn}(z) = \tfrac{1}{2}z(3z-1)$$
$$\text{Kr}(z) = \tfrac{1}{2}z(3z+1)$$

The fifth formula contains the Regular Partition Numbers as coefficients.

The Regular Partition Number Sequence $\mathrm{P}(n)$ itself indicates the number of ways in which a positive integer number $n$ can be split into positive integer summands. For the numbers $n = 1$ to $n = 5$, the associated partition numbers $P$ with all associated number partitions are listed in the following table:

Example values of P(n) and associated number partitions
| n | P(n) | Corresponding partitions |
|---|---|---|
| 1 | 1 | (1) |
| 2 | 2 | (1+1), (2) |
| 3 | 3 | (1+1+1), (1+2), (3) |
| 4 | 5 | (1+1+1+1), (1+1+2), (2+2), (1+3), (4) |
| 5 | 7 | (1+1+1+1+1), (1+1+1+2), (1+2+2), (1+1+3), (2+3), (1+4), (5) |
| 6 | 11 | (1+1+1+1+1+1), (1+1+1+1+2), (1+1+2+2), (2+2+2), (1+1+1+3), (1+2+3), (3+3), (1+1+4), (2+4), (1+5), (6) |

=== Further Dedekind eta identities ===
The following further simplification for the modulated functions $G_{M}$ and $H_{M}$ can be undertaken. This connection applies especially to the Dedekind eta function from the fifth power of the elliptic nome:

$$\frac{\eta _{W}(q^5)}{\eta _{W}(q)} = \frac{\eta _{W}(q^2)^4}{\eta _{W }(q)^4} \,\frac{\vartheta _{01}(q^5)}{\vartheta _{01}(q)} \biggl[\frac{5\,\vartheta _{01}(q^ 5)^2}{4\,\vartheta_{01}(q)^2} - \frac{1}{4}\biggr]^{-1}$$

These two identities with respect to the Rogers–Ramanujan continued fraction were given for the modulated functions $G_{M}$ and $H_{M}$:

$$G_{M}(q) = \eta_{W}(q^5)^{1/2} \eta_{W}(q)^{-1/2} R(q)^{- 1/2}$$
$$H_{M}(q) = \eta_{W}(q^5)^{1/2} \eta_{W}(q)^{-1/2} R(q)^{1 /2}$$

The combination of the last three formulas mentioned results in the following pair of formulas:

$G_{M}(q) = \frac{\eta _{W}(q^2)^2}{\eta _{W}(q)^2} \biggl[\frac{\vartheta _{01} (q^5)}{\vartheta _{01}(q)}\biggr]^{1/2} \biggl[\frac{5\,\vartheta _{01}(q^5)^2}{4\,\vartheta _{01}(q)^2} - \frac{1}{4}\biggr]^{-1/2} R(q)^{-1/2}$

$H_{M}(q) = \frac{\eta _{W}(q^2)^2}{\eta _{W}(q)^2} \biggl[\frac{\vartheta _{01} (q^5)}{\vartheta _{01}(q)}\biggr]^{1/2} \biggl[\frac{5\,\vartheta _{01}(q^5)^2}{4\,\vartheta _{01}(q)^2} - \frac{1}{4}\biggr]^{-1/2} R(q)^{1/2}$

=== Reduced Weber modular function ===
The Weber modular functions in their reduced form are an efficient way of computing the values of the Rogers–Ramanujan functions:

First of all we introduce the reduced Weber modular functions in that pattern:

$$w_{Rn}(\varepsilon) = \frac{2^{(n - 1)/4}[q(\varepsilon)^{n};q(\varepsilon)^{2n}]_{\infty}}{[q(\varepsilon);q(\varepsilon)^2]_{\infty}^{n}}$$

$$w_{R5}(\varepsilon) = \frac{2[q(\varepsilon)^{5};q(\varepsilon)^{10}]_{\infty}}{[q(\varepsilon);q(\varepsilon)^2]_{\infty}^{5}}$$

This function fulfills following equation of sixth degree:

$w_{R5}(\varepsilon)^6 - 2\,w_{R5}(\varepsilon)^5 = \tan\bigl[2\arctan(\varepsilon)\bigr]^2\bigl[2\,w_{R5}(\varepsilon) + 1\bigr]$

Therefore this $w_{R5}$ function is an algebraic function indeed.

But along with the Abel–Ruffini theorem this function in relation to the eccentricity can not be represented by elementary expressions.

However there are many values that in fact can be expressed elementarily.

Four examples shall be given for this:

First example:

$w_{R5}(\tfrac{1}{2}\sqrt{2})^6 - 2\,w_{R5}(\tfrac{1}{2}\sqrt{2})^5 = 16\,w_{R5}(\tfrac{1}{2}\sqrt{2}) + 8$
$w_{R5}(\tfrac{1}{2}\sqrt{2}) = \sqrt[4]{5} + 1$

Second example:

$w_{R5}(\sqrt{2} - 1)^6 - 2\,w_{R5}(\sqrt{2} - 1)^5 = 2\,w_{R5}(\sqrt{2} - 1) + 1$
$w_{R5}(\sqrt{2} - 1) = \tfrac{1}{2}\bigl\{\tfrac{4}{3}\sqrt{2}\cos(\tfrac{1}{10}\pi)\cosh[\tfrac{1}{3}\operatorname{artanh}(\tfrac{3}{8}\sqrt{6})]+\tfrac{1}{3}\tan(\tfrac{1}{5}\pi)\bigr\}^2 - \tfrac{1}{2} =$

$= \Phi^{-1}\cot\bigl[\tfrac{1}{4}\pi - \arctan\bigl(\tfrac{1}{3}\sqrt{5} - \tfrac{1}{3}\sqrt[3]{6\sqrt{30} + 4\sqrt{5}} + \tfrac{1}{3}\sqrt[3]{6\sqrt{30} - 4\sqrt{5}}\,\bigr)\bigr] =$

Third example:

$w_{R5}\bigl[(2 - \sqrt{3})(\sqrt{3} - \sqrt{2})\bigr]^6 - 2\,w_{R5}\bigl[(2 - \sqrt{3})(\sqrt{3} - \sqrt{2})\bigr]^5 = (\sqrt{2} - 1)^4 \bigl\{2\,w_{R5}[(2 - \sqrt{3})(\sqrt{3} - \sqrt{2})\bigr] + 1\bigr\}$
$w_{R5}[(2 - \sqrt{3})(\sqrt{3} - \sqrt{2})\bigr] = \cot\bigl[\tfrac{1}{4}\pi - \tfrac{1}{4}\arccsc(\tfrac{1}{4}\sqrt{10} + \tfrac{1}{4})\bigr]$

Fourth example:

$w_{R5}\bigl[(2 - \sqrt{3})(\sqrt{3} + \sqrt{2})\bigr]^6 - 2\,w_{R5}\bigl[(2 - \sqrt{3})(\sqrt{3} + \sqrt{2})\bigr]^5 = (\sqrt{2} + 1)^4 \bigl\{2\,w_{R5}[(2 - \sqrt{3})(\sqrt{3} + \sqrt{2})\bigr] + 1\bigr\}$
$w_{R5}[(2 - \sqrt{3})(\sqrt{3} + \sqrt{2})\bigr] = \cot\bigl[\tfrac{1}{4}\arccsc(\tfrac{1}{4}\sqrt{10} + \tfrac{1}{4})\bigr]$

For that function, a further expression is valid:

$$w_{R5}(\varepsilon) = \frac{5\,\vartheta_{01}[q(k)^5]^2}{2\,\vartheta_{01}[q(k)]^2} - \frac{1}{2}$$

=== Exact eccentricity identity for the functions G and H ===
In this way the accurate eccentricity dependent formulas for the functions G and H can be generated:

Following Dedekind eta function quotient has this eccentricity dependency:

$$\frac{\eta_{W}[q(\varepsilon)^2]}{\eta_{W}[q(\varepsilon)]} = 2^{-1/4} \tan\bigl[2\arctan(\varepsilon)\bigr]^{1/12}$$

This is the eccentricity dependent formula for the continued fraction R:

$$R[q(\varepsilon)] = \tan\biggl\{\frac{1}{2}\arctan\biggl[\frac{w_{R5}(\varepsilon) - 2}{2\,w_{R5}(\varepsilon) + 1}\biggr]\biggr\}^{1/5} \tan\biggl\{\frac{1}{2}\arccot\biggl[\frac{w_{R5}(\varepsilon) - 2}{2\,w_{R5}(\varepsilon) + 1}\biggr]\biggr\}^{2/5}$$

The last three now mentioned formulas will be inserted into the final formulas mentioned in the section above:

$G_{M}\bigl[q(\varepsilon)\bigr] = \frac{\tan\bigl[2\arctan(\varepsilon)\bigr]^{1/6} \bigl[2\,w_{R5}(\varepsilon) + 1\bigr]^{1/4}}{5^{1/4} w_{R5}(\varepsilon)^{1/2}} \tan\biggl\{\frac{1}{2}\arctan\biggl[\frac{w_{R5}(\varepsilon) - 2}{2\,w_{R5}(\varepsilon) + 1}\biggr]\biggr\}^{-1/10} \tan\biggl\{\frac{1}{2}\arccot\biggl[\frac{w_{R5}(\varepsilon) - 2}{2\,w_{R5}(\varepsilon) + 1}\biggr]\biggr\}^{-1/5}$

$H_{M}\bigl[q(\varepsilon)\bigr] = \frac{\tan\bigl[2\arctan(\varepsilon)\bigr]^{1/6} \bigl[2\,w_{R5}(\varepsilon) + 1\bigr]^{1/4}}{5^{1/4} w_{R5}(\varepsilon)^{1/2}} \tan\biggl\{\frac{1}{2}\arctan\biggl[\frac{w_{R5}(\varepsilon) - 2}{2\,w_{R5}(\varepsilon) + 1}\biggr]\biggr\}^{1/10} \tan\biggl\{\frac{1}{2}\arccot\biggl[\frac{w_{R5}(\varepsilon) - 2}{2\,w_{R5}(\varepsilon) + 1}\biggr]\biggr\}^{1/5}$

On the left side of the balances the functions $G_{M}(q)$ and $H_{M}(q)$ in relation to the elliptic nome function $q(\varepsilon)$ are written down directly.

And on the right side an algebraic combination of the eccentricity $\varepsilon$ is formulated.

Therefore these functions $G_{M}(q) = q^{-1/60} G(q)$ and $H_{M}(q) = q^{11/60} H(q)$ are modular functions indeed!

== Application to quintic equations ==
=== Discovery of the corresponding modulus by Charles Hermite ===
The general case of quintic equations in the Bring–Jerrard form has a non-elementary solution based on the Abel–Ruffini theorem and will now be explained using the elliptic nome of the corresponding modulus, described by the lemniscate elliptic functions in a simplified way.

$$x^5 + 5\,x = 4\,c$$

The real solution for all real values $c \in \R$ can be determined as follows:

$$\begin{align}
x = {} & \frac{S\bigl\langle q\{\operatorname{ctlh}[\tfrac{1}{2}\operatorname{aclh}(c)]^2\}\bigr\rangle^2 - R\bigl\langle q\{\operatorname{ctlh}[\tfrac{1}{2}\operatorname{aclh}(c)]^2\}^2\bigr\rangle}{S\bigl\langle q\{\operatorname{ctlh}[\tfrac{1}{2}\operatorname{aclh}(c)]^2\}\bigr\rangle^2} \times \\[4pt]
& {} \times \frac{1 - R\bigl\langle q\{\operatorname{ctlh}[\tfrac{1}{2}\operatorname{aclh}(c)]^2 \}^2 \bigr\rangle\,S\bigl\langle q\{\operatorname{ctlh}[\tfrac{1}{2}\operatorname{aclh}(c)]^2\} \bigr\rangle}{R\bigl\langle q\{\operatorname{ctlh}[\tfrac{1}{2}\operatorname{aclh}(c)]^2\}^2 \bigr\rangle^2} \times \\[4pt]
& {} \times \frac{\vartheta_{00}\bigl\langle q\{\operatorname{ctlh}[\tfrac{1}{2}\operatorname{aclh}(c)]^2\}^5 \bigr\rangle\,\vartheta_{00}\bigl\langle q\{\operatorname{ctlh}[\tfrac{1}{2}\operatorname{aclh}(c)]^2\}^{1/5} \bigr\rangle^2 - 5\,\vartheta_{00}\bigl\langle q\{\operatorname{ctlh}[\tfrac{1}{2} \operatorname{aclh}(c)]^2\}^5\bigr\rangle^3}{4\,\vartheta_{10}\bigl\langle q\{\operatorname{ctlh}[\tfrac{1}{2} \operatorname{aclh}(c)]^2\}\bigr\rangle\,\vartheta_{01}\bigl\langle q\{\operatorname{ctlh}[\tfrac{1}{2} \operatorname{aclh}(c)]^2\}\bigr\rangle\,\vartheta_{00}\bigl\langle q\{\operatorname{ctlh}[\tfrac{1}{2} \operatorname{aclh}(c)]^2\}\bigr\rangle}
\end{align}$$

Alternatively, the same solution can be presented in this way:

$$\begin{align}
x = {} & \frac{ 5\,\vartheta _{00}(Q^5)^3 - \vartheta _{00}(Q^5)\,\vartheta _{00}(Q)^2}{4\,\vartheta _{10}(Q)\,\vartheta _{01}(Q)\,\vartheta _{00}(Q)} \times \frac{S(Q)^2 + R(Q^2)}{ S(Q)} \times \bigl[ R(Q^2)S(Q) + R(Q^2) + S(Q) - 1 \bigr] \\[4pt]
& \mathrm{with}\,\, Q = q\bigl\{\mathrm{ctlh}\bigl[ \tfrac{1}{2} \operatorname{aclh}(c)\bigr]^2\bigr\}
\end{align}$$

The mathematician Charles Hermite determined the value of the elliptic modulus k in relation to the coefficient of the absolute term of the Bring–Jerrard form. In his essay "Sur la résolution de l'Équation du cinquiéme degré Comptes rendus" he described the calculation method for the elliptic modulus in terms of the absolute term. The Italian version of his essay "Sulla risoluzione delle equazioni del quinto grado" contains exactly on page 258 the upper Bring–Jerrard equation formula, which can be solved directly with the functions based on the corresponding elliptic modulus. This corresponding elliptic modulus can be worked out by using the square of the Hyperbolic lemniscate cotangent. For the derivation of this, please see the Wikipedia article lemniscate elliptic functions!

The elliptic nome of this corresponding modulus is represented here with the letter Q:

$$Q =q\bigl\{\mathrm{ctlh}\bigl[\tfrac{1}{2}\operatorname{aclh}(c)\bigr]^2\bigr\} =$$

$$=q\bigl[\bigl(\sqrt{\sqrt{c^4 + 1} + 1} + c\bigr)\bigl(2c^2 + 2 + 2\sqrt{c^4 + 1} \,\bigr)^{-1/2}\bigr]$$

The abbreviation ctlh expresses the Hyperbolic Lemniscate Cotangent and the abbreviation aclh represents the Hyperbolic Lemniscate Areacosine!

=== Calculation examples ===
Two examples of this solution algorithm are now mentioned:

First calculation example:

Quintic Bring–Jerrard equation:

$$x^5 + 5\,x = 8$$

Solution formula:

$$\begin{align}
x = {} & \frac{S\bigl\langle q\{\operatorname{ctlh}[\tfrac{1}{2}\operatorname{aclh}(2)]^2\}\bigr\rangle^2 - R\bigl\langle q\{\operatorname{ctlh}[\tfrac{1}{2}\operatorname{aclh}(2)]^2\}^2\bigr\rangle}{S\bigl\langle q\{\operatorname{ctlh}[\tfrac{1}{2}\operatorname{aclh}(2)]^2\}\bigr\rangle^2} \times \\[4pt]
& {} \times \frac{1 - R\bigl\langle q\{\operatorname{ctlh}[\tfrac{1}{2}\operatorname{aclh}(2)]^2 \}^2 \bigr\rangle\,S\bigl\langle q\{\operatorname{ctlh}[\tfrac{1}{2}\operatorname{aclh}(2)]^2\} \bigr\rangle}{R\bigl\langle q\{\operatorname{ctlh}[\tfrac{1}{2}\operatorname{aclh}(2)]^2\}^2 \bigr\rangle^2} \times \\[4pt]
& {} \times \frac{\vartheta_{00}\bigl\langle q\{\operatorname{ctlh}[\tfrac{1}{2}\operatorname{aclh}(2)]^2\}^5 \bigr\rangle\,\vartheta_{00}\bigl\langle q\{\operatorname{ctlh}[\tfrac{1}{2}\operatorname{aclh}(2)]^2\}^{1/5} \bigr\rangle^2 - 5\,\vartheta_{00}\bigl\langle q\{\operatorname{ctlh}[\tfrac{1}{2} \operatorname{aclh}(2)]^2\}^5\bigr\rangle^3}{4\,\vartheta_{10}\bigl\langle q\{\operatorname{ctlh}[\tfrac{1}{2} \operatorname{aclh}(2)]^2\}\bigr\rangle\,\vartheta_{01}\bigl\langle q\{\operatorname{ctlh}[\tfrac{1}{2} \operatorname{aclh}(2)]^2\}\bigr\rangle\,\vartheta_{00}\bigl\langle q\{\operatorname{ctlh}[\tfrac{1}{2} \operatorname{aclh}(2)]^2\}\bigr\rangle}
\end{align}$$

Decimal places of the nome:

$$q\bigl\{\mathrm{ctlh}\bigl[\tfrac{1}{2}\operatorname{aclh}(2)\bigr]^2\bigr\} = q\bigl[\bigl(\sqrt{\sqrt{17} + 1} + 2\bigr)\bigl(10 + 2\sqrt{17}\bigr)^{-1/2}\bigr] =$$

$$= 0{,} 3063466544466074265361088194021326272090461143559097382981847144\ldots$$

Decimal places of the solution:

$$x = 1{,} 1670361837016430473110194319963961012975521104880199105205748723\ldots$$

Second calculation example:

Quintic Bring–Jerrard equation:

$$x^5 + 5\,x = 12$$

Solution:

$$\begin{align}
x = {} & \frac{S\bigl\langle q\{\operatorname{ctlh}[\tfrac{1}{2}\operatorname{aclh}(3)]^2\}\bigr\rangle^2 - R\bigl\langle q\{\operatorname{ctlh}[\tfrac{1}{2}\operatorname{aclh}(3)]^2\}^2\bigr\rangle}{S\bigl\langle q\{\operatorname{ctlh}[\tfrac{1}{2}\operatorname{aclh}(3)]^2\}\bigr\rangle^2} \times \\[4pt]
& {} \times \frac{1 - R\bigl\langle q\{\operatorname{ctlh}[\tfrac{1}{2}\operatorname{aclh}(3)]^2 \}^2 \bigr\rangle\,S\bigl\langle q\{\operatorname{ctlh}[\tfrac{1}{2}\operatorname{aclh}(3)]^2\} \bigr\rangle}{R\bigl\langle q\{\operatorname{ctlh}[\tfrac{1}{2}\operatorname{aclh}(3)]^2\}^2 \bigr\rangle^2} \times \\[4pt]
& {} \times \frac{\vartheta_{00}\bigl\langle q\{\operatorname{ctlh}[\tfrac{1}{2}\operatorname{aclh}(3)]^2\}^5 \bigr\rangle\,\vartheta_{00}\bigl\langle q\{\operatorname{ctlh}[\tfrac{1}{2}\operatorname{aclh}(3)]^2\}^{1/5} \bigr\rangle^2 - 5\,\vartheta_{00}\bigl\langle q\{\operatorname{ctlh}[\tfrac{1}{2} \operatorname{aclh}(3)]^2\}^5\bigr\rangle^3}{4\,\vartheta_{10}\bigl\langle q\{\operatorname{ctlh}[\tfrac{1}{2} \operatorname{aclh}(3)]^2\}\bigr\rangle\,\vartheta_{01}\bigl\langle q\{\operatorname{ctlh}[\tfrac{1}{2} \operatorname{aclh}(3)]^2\}\bigr\rangle\,\vartheta_{00}\bigl\langle q\{\operatorname{ctlh}[\tfrac{1}{2} \operatorname{aclh}(3)]^2\}\bigr\rangle}
\end{align}$$

Decimal places of the nome:

$$q\bigl\{\mathrm{ctlh}\bigl[\tfrac{1}{2}\operatorname{aclh}(3)\bigr]^2\bigr\} = q\bigl[\bigl(\sqrt{\sqrt{82} + 1} + 3\bigr)\bigl(20 + 2\sqrt{82}\bigr)^{-1/2}\bigr] =$$

$$= 0{,} 3706649511520240756244325221775686571518680899597473957509743879\ldots$$

Decimal places of the solution:

$$x = 1{,} 3840917958231463592477551262671354748859350601806764501691889116\ldots$$

== Applications in Physics ==
The Rogers–Ramanujan identities appeared in Baxter's solution of the hard hexagon model in statistical mechanics.

The demodularized standard form of the Ramanujan's continued fraction unanchored from the modular form is as follows:

$$\frac{H(q)}{G(q)} = \left[ 1+\frac{q}{1+\frac{q^2}{1+\frac{q^3}{1+\cdots }}} \right]$$

== Relations to affine Lie algebras and vertex operator algebras ==
James Lepowsky and Robert Lee Wilson were the first to prove Rogers–Ramanujan identities using completely representation-theoretic techniques. They proved these identities using level 3 modules for the affine Lie algebra $\widehat{\mathfrak{sl}_2}$. In the course of this proof they invented and used what they called $Z$-algebras. Lepowsky and Wilson's approach is universal, in that it is able to treat all affine Lie algebras at all levels. It can be used to find (and prove) new partition identities. First such example is that of Capparelli's identities discovered by Stefano Capparelli using level 3 modules for the affine Lie algebra $A_2^{(2)}$.

== See also ==
- Rogers polynomials
- Continuous q-Hermite polynomials
