= Complexor =

The word complexor was coined by Marcial Losada derived from the words "complex order", to refer to chaotic attractors that are strange and thus have fractal structure (in contrast to fixed point or limit cycle attractors).

Losada claimed that these trajectories reflect the creativity and innovation that characterize high performance teams, while in contrast, low performance teams have trajectories in phase space that approach the limiting dynamics of point attractors. The modeling behind this claim has been strongly criticised for flawed methodology and as an invalid application of Lorenz equations by Brown et al. and by Andrés Navas.
