= Degree of a polynomial =

Mathematical concept

In mathematics, the degree of a polynomial is the highest of the degrees of the polynomial's monomials (individual terms) with non-zero coefficients. The degree of a term is the sum of the exponents of the variables that appear in it, and thus is a non-negative integer. For a univariate polynomial, the degree of the polynomial is simply the highest exponent occurring in the polynomial. The term order has been used as a synonym of degree but, nowadays, may refer to several other concepts (see Order of a polynomial (disambiguation)).

For example, the polynomial $7x^2y^3 + 4x - 9,$ which can also be written as $7x^2y^3 + 4x^1y^0 - 9x^0y^0,$ has three terms. The first term has a degree of 5 (the sum of the powers 2 and 3), the second term has a degree of 1, and the last term has a degree of 0. Therefore, the polynomial has a degree of 5, which is the highest degree of any term.

To determine the degree of a polynomial that is not in standard form, such as $(x+1)^2 - (x-1)^2$, one can put it in standard form by expanding the products (by distributivity) and combining the like terms; for example, $(x+1)^2 - (x-1)^2 = 4x$ is of degree 1, even though each summand has degree 2. However, this is not needed when the polynomial is written as a product of polynomials in standard form, because the degree of a product is the sum of the degrees of the factors.

== Names of polynomials by degree ==
The following names are assigned to polynomials according to their degree:

- Special case – zero (see § Degree of the zero polynomial, below)
- Degree 0 – non-zero constant
- Degree 1 – linear
- Degree 2 – quadratic
- Degree 3 – cubic
- Degree 4 – quartic (or, if all terms have even degree, biquadratic)
- Degree 5 – quintic
- Degree 6 – sextic (or, less commonly, hexic)
- Degree 7 – septic (or, less commonly, heptic)
- Degree 8 – octic
- Degree 9 – nonic
- Degree 10 – decic

Names for degree above three are based on Latin ordinal numbers, and end in -ic. This should be distinguished from the names used for the number of variables, the arity, which are based on Latin distributive numbers, and end in -ary. For example, a degree two polynomial in two variables, such as $x^2 + xy + y^2$, is called a "binary quadratic": binary due to two variables, quadratic due to degree two. (Note: For simplicity, this is a homogeneous polynomial, with equal degree in both variables separately.) There are also names for the number of terms, which are also based on Latin distributive numbers, ending in -nomial; the common ones are monomial, binomial, and (less commonly) trinomial; thus $x^2 + y^2$ is a "binary quadratic binomial".

== Examples ==
The polynomial $(y - 3)(2y + 6)(-4y - 21)$ is a cubic polynomial: after multiplying out and collecting terms of the same degree, it becomes $- 8 y^3 - 42 y^2 + 72 y + 378$, with highest exponent 3.

The polynomial $(3 z^8 + z^5 - 4 z^2 + 6) + (-3 z^8 + 8 z^4 + 2 z^3 + 14 z)$ is a quintic polynomial: upon combining like terms, the two terms of degree 8 cancel, leaving $z^5 + 8 z^4 + 2 z^3 - 4 z^2 + 14 z + 6$, with highest exponent 5.

== Behavior under polynomial operations ==
The degree of the sum, the product or the composition of two polynomials is strongly related to the degree of the input polynomials.

=== Addition ===
The degree of the sum (or difference) of two polynomials is less than or equal to the greater of their degrees; that is,

$\deg(P + Q) \leq \max\{\deg(P),\deg(Q)\}$ and $\deg(P - Q) \leq \max\{\deg(P),\deg(Q)\}$.

For example, the degree of $(x^3+x)-(x^3+x^2)=-x^2+x$ is 2, and $2 \leq \max\{3, 3\}$.

The equality always holds when the degrees of the polynomials are different. For example, the degree of $(x^3+x)+(x^2+1)=x^3+x^2+x+1$ is 3, and $3 = \max\{3, 2\}$.

=== Multiplication ===
The degree of the product of a polynomial by a non-zero scalar is equal to the degree of the polynomial; that is,

$$\deg(cP)=\deg(P)$$.

For example, the degree of $2(x^2+3x-2)=2x^2+6x-4$ is 2, which is equal to the degree of $x^2+3x-2$.

Thus, the set of polynomials (with coefficients from a given field F) whose degrees are smaller than or equal to a given number n forms a vector space; for more, see Examples of vector spaces.

More generally, the degree of the product of two polynomials over a field or an integral domain is the sum of their degrees:

$$\deg(PQ) = \deg(P) + \deg(Q)$$.

For example, the degree of $(x^3+x)(x^2+1)=x^5+2x^3+x$ is $5 = 3+2$.

For polynomials over an arbitrary ring, the above rules may not be valid, because of cancellation that can occur when multiplying two nonzero constants. For example, in the ring $\mathbf{Z}/4\mathbf{Z}$ of integers modulo 4, one has that $\deg(2x) = \deg(1+2x) = 1$, but $\deg(2x(1+2x)) = \deg(2x) = 1$, which is not equal to the sum of the degrees of the factors.

=== Composition ===
The degree of the composition of two non-constant polynomials $P$ and $Q$ over a field or integral domain is the product of their degrees:
$$\deg(P \circ Q) = \deg(P)\deg(Q).$$

For example, if $P = x^3+x$ has degree 3 and $Q = x^2 - 1$ has degree 2, then their composition is $P \circ Q = P \circ (x^2 - 1) = (x^2 - 1)^3+(x^2 - 1) = x^6 - 3x^4+4x^2 - 2,$ which has degree 6.

Note that for polynomials over an arbitrary ring, the degree of the composition may be less than the product of the degrees. For example, in $\mathbf{Z}/4\mathbf{Z},$ the composition of the polynomials $2x$ and $1+2x$ (both of degree 1) is the constant polynomial $2x\circ(1+2x) = 2+4x= 2,$ of degree 0.

== Degree of the zero polynomial ==
The degree of the zero polynomial is either left undefined, or is defined to be negative (usually −1 or $-\infty$).

Like any constant value, the value 0 can be considered as a (constant) polynomial, called the zero polynomial. It has no nonzero terms, and so, strictly speaking, it has no degree either. As such, its degree is usually undefined. The propositions for the degree of sums and products of polynomials in the above section do not apply, if any of the polynomials involved is the zero polynomial.

It is convenient, however, to define the degree of the zero polynomial to be negative infinity, $-\infty,$ and to introduce the arithmetic rules

$$\max(a,-\infty) = a,$$

and

$$a + (-\infty) = -\infty.$$

These examples illustrate how this extension satisfies the behavior rules above:

- The degree of the sum $(x^3+x)+(0)=x^3+x$ is 3. This satisfies the expected behavior, which is that $3 \le \max(3, -\infty)$.
- The degree of the difference $(x)-(x) = 0$ is $-\infty$. This satisfies the expected behavior, which is that $-\infty \le \max(1,1)$.
- The degree of the product $(0)(x^2+1)=0$ is $-\infty$. This satisfies the expected behavior, which is that $-\infty = -\infty + 2$.

== Computed from the function values ==
A number of formulae exist which will evaluate the degree of a polynomial function f. One based on asymptotic analysis is

$$\deg f = \lim_{x\rarr\infty}\frac{\log |f(x)|}{\log x}$$;

this is the exact counterpart of the method of estimating the slope in a log–log plot.

This formula generalizes the concept of degree to some functions that are not polynomials. For example:

- The degree of the multiplicative inverse, $\ 1/x$, is −1.
- The degree of the square root, $\sqrt x$, is 1/2.
- The degree of the logarithm, $\ \log x$, is 0.
- The degree of the exponential function, $\exp x$, is $\infty.$

The formula also gives sensible results for many combinations of such functions, e.g., the degree of $\frac{1 + \sqrt{x}}{x}$ is $-1/2$.

Another formula to compute the degree of f from its values is

$$\deg f = \lim_{x\to\infty}\frac{x f'(x)}{f(x)}$$;

this second formula follows from applying L'Hôpital's rule to the first formula. Intuitively though, it is more about exhibiting the degree d as the extra constant factor in the derivative $d x^{d-1}$ of $x^d$.

A more fine grained (than a simple numeric degree) description of the asymptotics of a function can be had by using big O notation. In the analysis of algorithms, it is for example often relevant to distinguish between the growth rates of $x$ and $x \log x$, which would both come out as having the same degree according to the above formulae.

== Extension to polynomials with two or more variables ==
For polynomials in two or more variables, the degree of a term is the sum of the exponents of the variables in the term; the degree (sometimes called the total degree) of the polynomial is again the maximum of the degrees of all terms in the polynomial. For example, the polynomial x^{2}y^{2} + 3x^{3} + 4y has degree 4, the same degree as the term x^{2}y^{2}.

However, a polynomial in variables x and y, is a polynomial in x with coefficients which are polynomials in y, and also a polynomial in y with coefficients which are polynomials in x. The polynomial

$$x^2y^2 + 3x^3 + 4y = (3)x^3 + (y^2)x^2 + (4y) =  (x^2)y^2 + (4)y  + (3x^3)$$

has degree 3 in x and degree 2 in y.

== Degree function in abstract algebra ==
Given a ring R, the polynomial ring R[x] is the set of all polynomials in x that have coefficients in R. In the special case that R is also a field, the polynomial ring R[x] is a principal ideal domain and, more importantly to our discussion here, a Euclidean domain.

It can be shown that the degree of a polynomial over a field satisfies all of the requirements of the norm function in the euclidean domain. That is, given two polynomials f(x) and g(x), the degree of the product f(x)g(x) must be larger than both the degrees of f and g individually. In fact, something stronger holds:

$$\deg(f(x)g(x)) = \deg(f(x)) + \deg(g(x))$$

For an example of why the degree function may fail over a ring that is not a field, take the following example. Let R = $\mathbb{Z}/4\mathbb{Z}$, the ring of integers modulo 4. This ring is not a field (and is not even an integral domain) because 2 × 2 = 4 ≡ 0 (mod 4). Therefore, let f(x) = g(x) = 2x + 1. Then, f(x)g(x) = 4x^{2} + 4x + 1 = 1. Thus deg(f⋅g) = 0 which is not greater than the degrees of f and g (which each had degree 1).

Since the norm function is not defined for the zero element of the ring, we consider the degree of the polynomial f(x) = 0 to also be undefined so that it follows the rules of a norm in a Euclidean domain.

== See also ==
- Abel–Ruffini theorem
- Fundamental theorem of algebra
