= Order of a polynomial =

In mathematics, the order of a polynomial may refer to:

- the degree of a polynomial, that is, the largest exponent (for a univariate polynomial) or the largest sum of exponents (for a multivariate polynomial) in any of its monomials;
- the multiplicative order, that is, the number of times the polynomial is divisible by some value;
- the order of the polynomial considered as a power series, that is, the degree of its non-zero term of lowest degree; or
- the order of a spline, either the degree+1 of the polynomials defining the spline or the number of knot points used to determine it.

== See also ==
- Order polynomial
- Orders of approximation
- Partial differential equation#Classification
