= List of Shanti Swarup Bhatnagar Prize recipients =

Shanti Swarup Bhatnagar Prize for Science and Technology
- National award for contributions to science
- Awarded for: Multi-disciplinary science award
- Sponsored by: Council of Scientific and Industrial Research
- Rewards: Citation Plaque; ₹500,000 Monthly retainer of ₹15,000 (Note: The retainer is paid till the recipient attains the age of 65.)
- First award: 1958
- Final award: 2025

Highlights
- Total awarded: 595
- First winner: K. S. Krishnan
- Website: ssbprize.gov.in

The Shanti Swarup Bhatnagar Prize for Science and Technology is one of the highest multidisciplinary science awards in India. It was instituted in 1958 by the Council of Scientific and Industrial Research in honor of Shanti Swarup Bhatnagar, its founder director and recognizes excellence in scientific research in India.

== List of recipients ==
=== General information ===
Shanti Swarup Bhatnagar

Shanti Swaroop Bhatnagar, (1894–1955), popularly known in India as the Father of Research Laboratories, was the founder director-general of the Council of Scientific and Industrial Research. A recipient of the civilian honor of the Padma Bhushan, he was knighted by the Queen of Britain in 1941.

Category	Year started	Total recipients	First recipient(s)
Biological sciences	1960	105	Toppur Seethapathy Sadasivan
Chemical sciences	1960	102	T. R. Govindachari
Earth, atmosphere, ocean and planetary sciences	1972	54	Kshitindramohan Naha
Engineering sciences	1960	85	Homi Sethna
Mathematical sciences	1959	77	K. S. Chandrasekharan; C. R. Rao
Medical sciences	1961	69	Ram Behari Arora
Physical sciences	1958	105	K. S. Krishnan

Gender of recipients
Gender	number
Male	575
Female	20

=== Biological sciences ===
M. S. Swaminathan	Shekhar C. Mande	Amar Nath Bhaduri	Govindarajan Padmanaban	Madhav Gadgil	Raghavendra Gadagkar
M. R. S. Rao	Dinakar Mashnu Salunke	Dipankar Chatterji	K. Vijayraghavan	Gajendra Pal Singh Raghava	L. S. Shashidhara
Rajeev Kumar Varshney	Siddhartha Roy	Sanjeev Das			

List of awardees, showing the year, place, (Note: Birth place is given precedence over place of residence) and specialization
Year	Recipient	Place	Specialization
1960	Toppur Seethapathy Sadasivan	Tamil Nadu	Plant pathology
1961	M. S. Swaminathan	Tamil Nadu	Genetics
1962	Bimal Kumar Bachhawat	West Bengal	Glycobiology
1963	Jagannath Ganguly	West Bengal	Biochemistry
1964	Dilbagh Singh Athwal	Punjab	Plant breeding
1965	C. V. Subramanian	Tamil Nadu	Mycology
1966	Neelamraju Ganga Prasada Rao	Andhra Pradesh	Genetics
1966	Hari Krishan Jain	Delhi	Cytogenetics
1967	Arun Kumar Sharma	Delhi	Cytogenetics
1968	T. A. Venkitasubramanian	Delhi	Biochemistry
1971	N. Balakrishnan Nair	Kerala	Marine biology
1971	Madhu Sudan Kanungo	Odisha	Gerontology
1972	Birendra Bijoy Biswas	West Bengal	Plant pathology
1972	Satish Chandra Maheshwari	Rajasthan	Molecular biology
1973	B. R. Murty	Delhi	Genetics
1973	Sardul Singh Guraya	Punjab	Cell biology
1974	John Barnabas	Maharashtra	Evolutionary biology
1975	Archana Sharma	Maharashtra	Cytogenetics
1975	Obaid Siddiqi	Uttar Pradesh	Genetics
1976	Kishan Singh	Delhi	Plant pathology
1976	Guru Prakash Dutta	Uttar Pradesh	Immunology
1977	T. C. Anand Kumar	Tamil Nadu	Reproductive biology
1978	V. Sasisekharan	USA (Note: Based in USA)	Molecular biology
1979	Maroli Krishnayya Chandrashekaran	Tamil Nadu	Neurophysiology
1979	Amar Nath Bhaduri	West Bengal	Enzymology
1980	Jamuna Sharan Singh	Uttar pradesh	Plant ecology
1980	Asis Datta	West Bengal	Molecular biology
1981	Sushil Kumar	Uttar Pradesh	Genetics
1981	Prafullachandra Vishnu Sane	Uttar Pradesh	Biochemistry
1982	Sunil Kumar Podder	West Bengal	Biophysics
1982	Ramamirtha Jayaraman	Tamil Nadu	Microbial genetics
1983	Govindarajan Padmanaban	Tamil Nadu	Biochemistry
1984	Thavamani Jegajothivel Pandian	Tamil Nadu	Bioenergetics
1984	K. R. K. Easwaran	Kerala	Biophysics
1985	C. M. Gupta	Rajasthan	Membrane biology
1985	Mamannamana Vijayan	Kerala	Structural biology
1986	Madhav Gadgil	Maharashtra	Conservation biology
1987	Sudhir Kumar Sopory	Haryana	Plant physiology
1987	Avadhesha Surolia	Rajasthan	Glycobiology
1988	Bhabatarak Bhattacharyya	West Bengal	Structural biology
1988	Manchanahalli Rangaswamy Satyanarayana Rao	Karnataka	Biological sciences
1989	Manju Ray	West Bengal	Biochemistry
1989	Subhash Chandra Lakhotia	Uttar Pradesh	Genetics
1990	Samir K. Brahmachari	West Bengal	Biophysics
1991	Virendra Nath Pandey	Uttar Pradesh	Virology
1991	Srinivas Kishanrao Saidapur	Karnataka	Reproductive biology
1992	Kuppamuthu Dharmalingam	Tamil Nadu	Genetic engineering
1992	Dipankar Chatterji	West Bengal	Molecular biology
1993	M. R. N. Murthy	Karnataka	Molecular biology
1993	Raghavendra Gadagkar	Uttar Pradesh	Ecology
1994	Ramakrishnan Nagaraj	Andhra Pradesh	Biophysics
1994	Alok Bhattacharya	Delhi	Parasitology
1995	Kalappa Muniyappa	Karnataka	Genetics
1995	Seyed Ehtesham Hasnain	Bihar	Molecular biology
1996	Ghanshyam Swarup	Uttar Pradesh	Molecular biology
1996	Vishweshwaraiah Prakash	Karnataka	Food technology
1997	Kanury Venkata Subba Rao	Maharashtra	Biotechnology
1997	Jayaraman Gowrishankar	Tamil Nadu	Microbiology
1998	Debi Prasad Sarkar	West Bengal	Immunology
1998	K. VijayRaghavan	Karnataka	Biotechnology
1999	Siddhartha Roy	West Bengal	Structural biology
1999	V. Nagaraja	Karnataka	Molecular biology
2000	Jayant B. Udgaonkar	Maharashtra	Biochemistry
2000	Dinakar Mashnu Salunke	Karnataka	Structural biology
2001	Umesh Varshney	Madhya Pradesh	Molecular biology
2001	Amitabha Chattopadhyay	West Bengal	Membrane biophysics
2002	Amitabha Mukhopadhyay	West Bengal	Molecular biology
2002	Raghavan Varadarajan	Karnataka	Biophysics
2003	Satyajit Mayor	Maharashtra	Stem cell biology
2004	Gopal Kundu	West Bengal	Genetics
2004	Ramesh Venkata Sonti	Andhra Pradesh	Genetics
2005	Shekhar C. Mande	Maharashtra	Structural biology
2005	Tapas Kumar Kundu	West Bengal	Molecular biology
2006	Vinod Bhakuni	Uttar Pradesh	Biophysics
2006	Rajesh Sudhir Gokhale	Delhi	Chemical biology
2007	Narayanaswamy Srinivasan	Tamil Nadu	Genomics
2007	Upinder Singh Bhalla	Delhi	Neurobiology
2008	L. S. Shashidhara	Maharashtra	Genetics
2008	Gajendra Pal Singh Raghava	Uttar Pradesh	Bioinformatics
2009	Amitabh Joshi	Karnataka	Genetics
2009	Bhaskar Saha	West Bengal	Immunology
2010	Sanjeev Galande	Maharashtra	Genomics
2010	Shubha Tole	Maharashtra	Neuroscience
2011	Amit Prakash Sharma	Delhi	Structural biology
2011	Rajan Sankaranarayanan	Tamil Nadu	Molecular biology
2012	Shantanu Chowdhury	West Bengal	Genomics
2012	Suman Kumar Dhar	West Bengal	Molecular biology
2013	Sathees Chukkurumbal Raghavan	Kerala	Biophysics
2014	Roop Mallik	Uttar Pradesh	Biophysics
2015	Balasubramanian Gopal	Karnataka	Biophysics
2015	Rajeev Kumar Varshney	Uttar Pradesh	Genetics
2016	Rishikesh Narayanan	Karnataka	Neuroscience
2016	Suvendra Nath Bhattacharyya	West Bengal	Molecular biology
2017	Deepak T. Nair	Kerala	Plant pathology
2017	Sanjeev Das	West Bengal	Cancer biology
2018	Thomas J. Pucadyil	Maharashtra	Membrane biochemistry
2018	Ganesh Nagaraju	Karnataka	DNA repair
2019	Soumen Basak	West Bengal	Immunology
2019	Kayarat Saikrishnan	Maharashtra	Structural biology
2020	Subhadeep Chatterjee	West Bengal	Molecular microbiology and host–pathogen interaction
2020	Vatsala Thirumalai	Tamil Nadu	Neuroscience
2021	Amit Singh	Karnataka	Microbiology and biochemistry
2021	Arun Kumar Shukla	Uttar Pradesh	Structural biology, cellular signaling, pharmacology membrane proteins, G protein
2023	Ashwani Kumar	Delhi	Microbial technology
2023	Maddika Subba Reddy	Telangana	DNA fingerprinting diagnostics
2024	Radhakrishnan Mahalakshmi		Biological Science
2024	Aravind Penmatsa		Biological Science

=== Chemical sciences ===
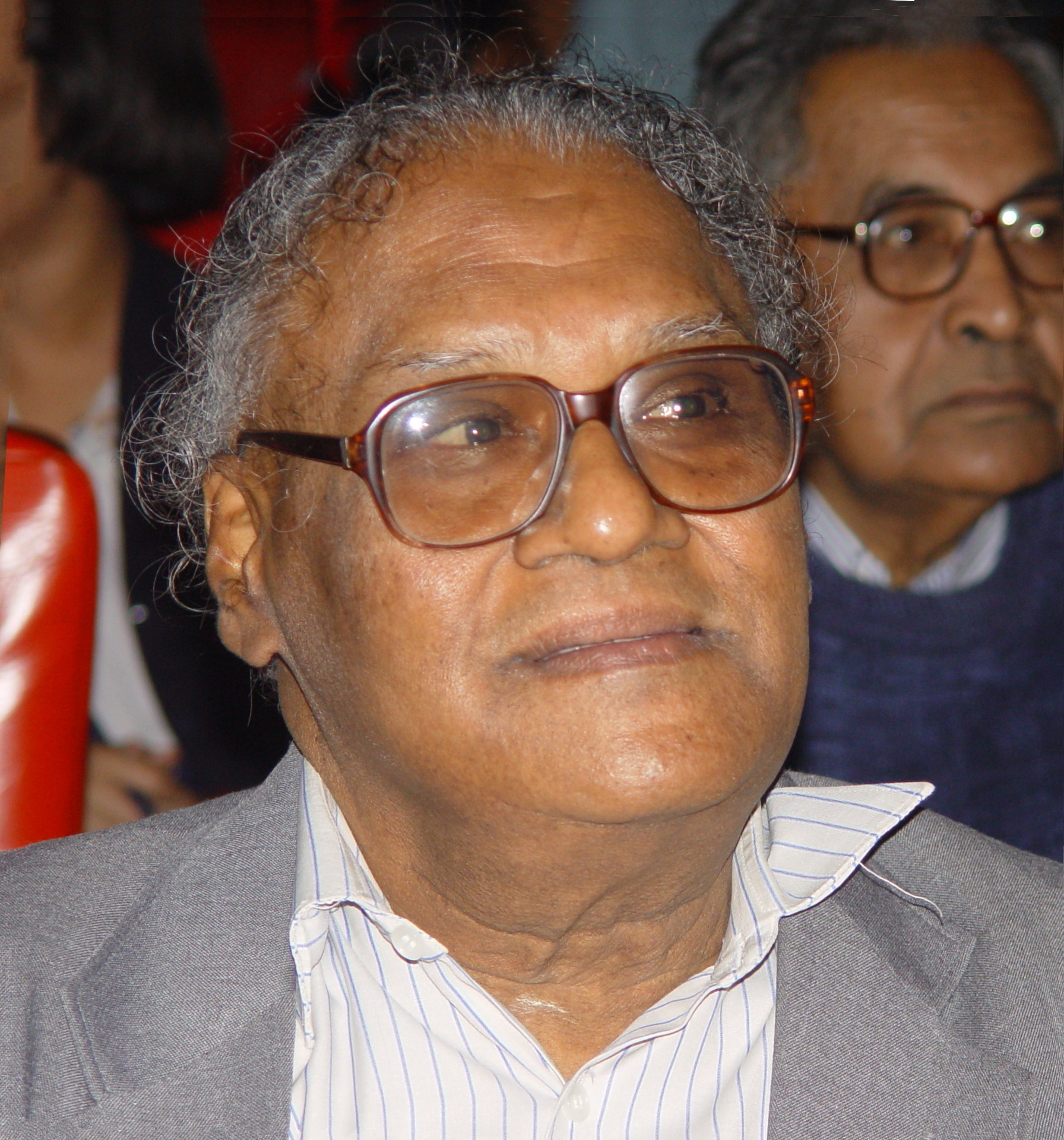
C. N. R. Rao

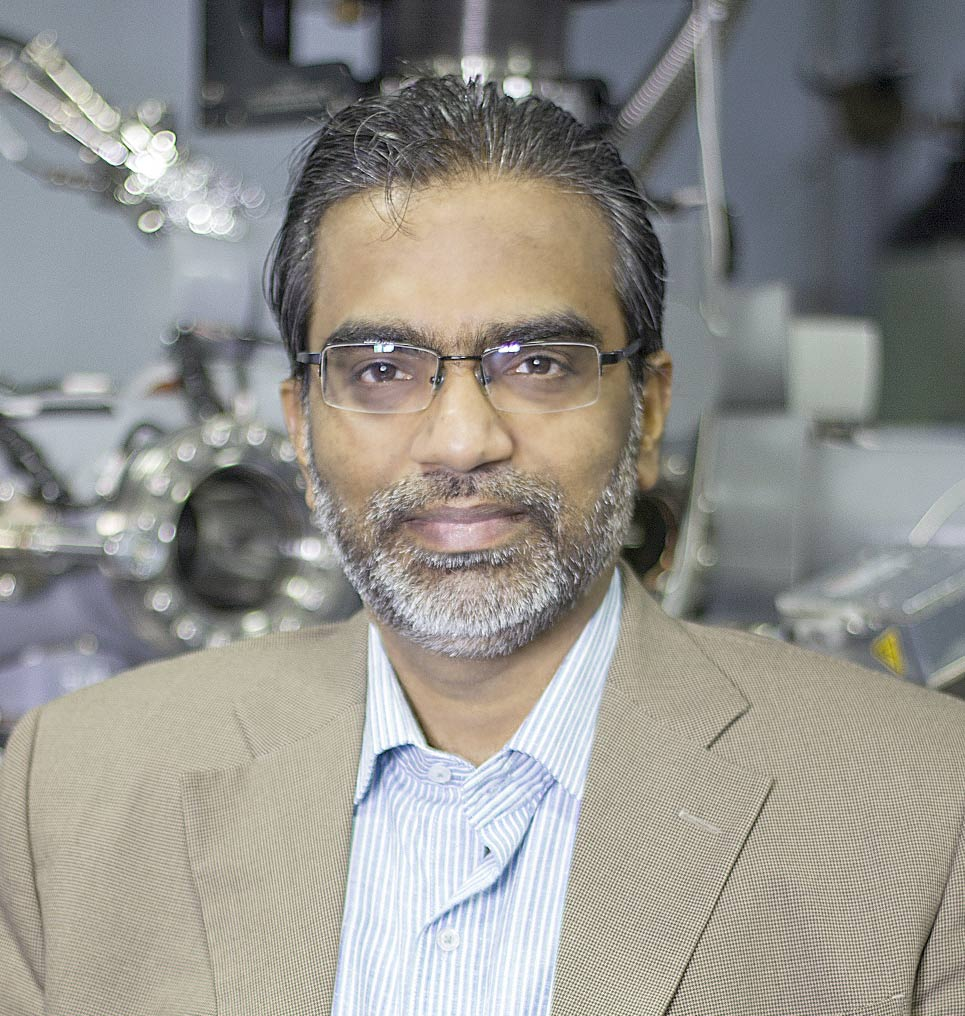
Thalappil Pradeep

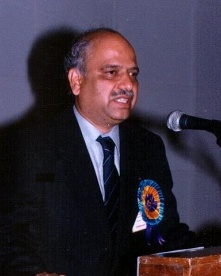
Shridhar Ramachandra Gadre

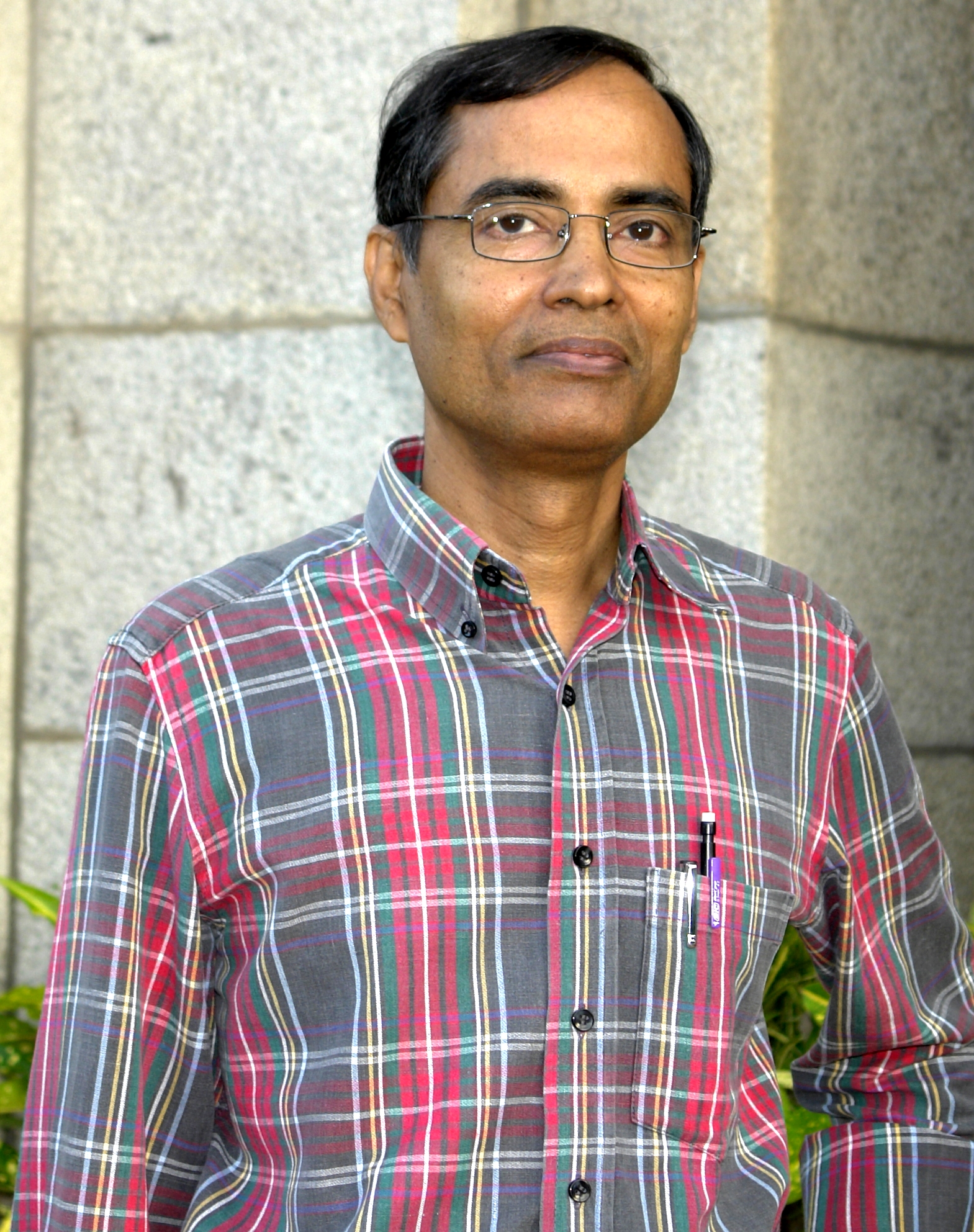
E. D. Jemmis

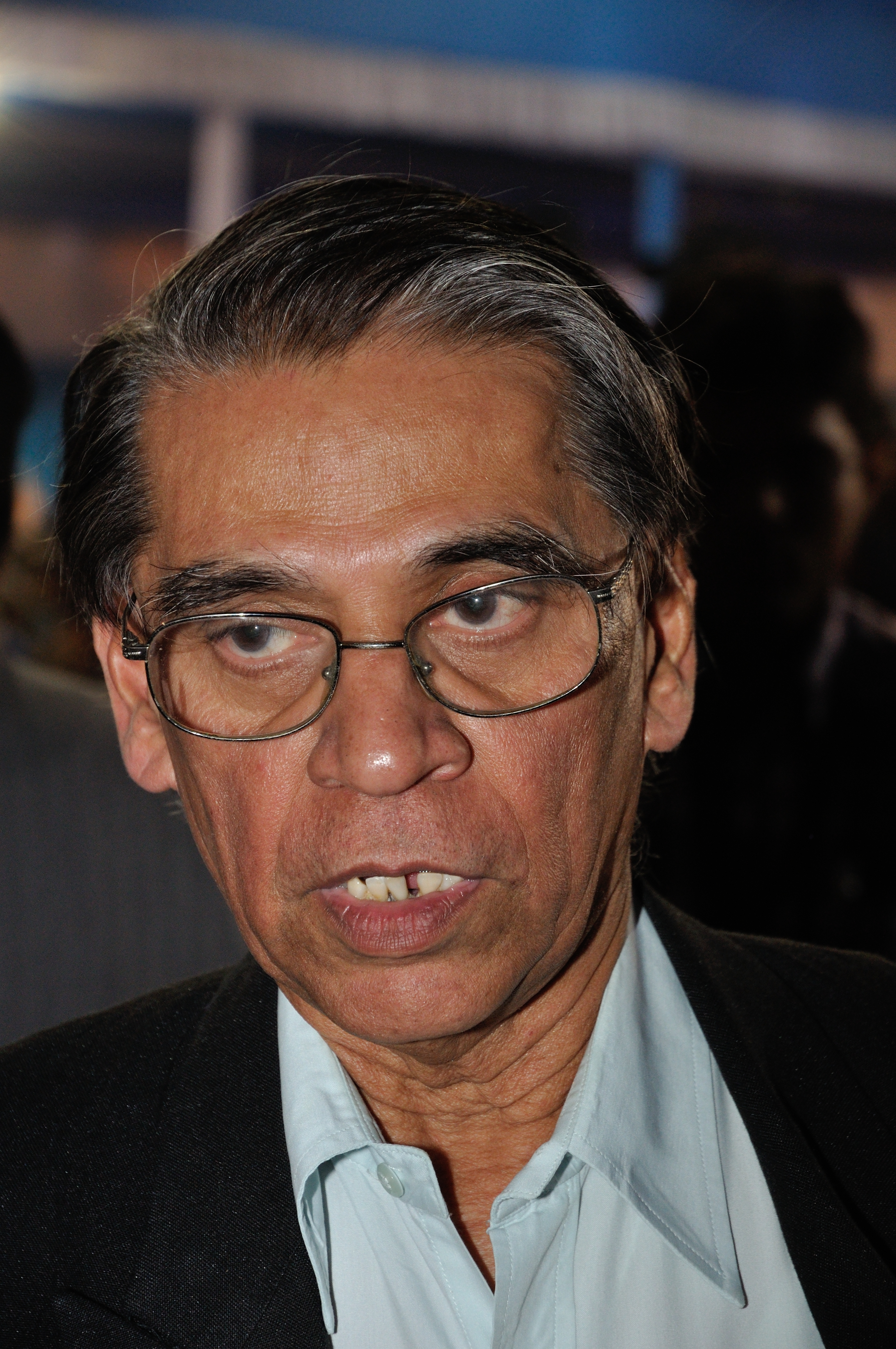
Thirumalachari Ramasami

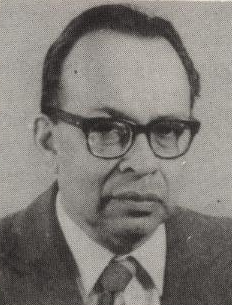
Manojit Mohan Dhar

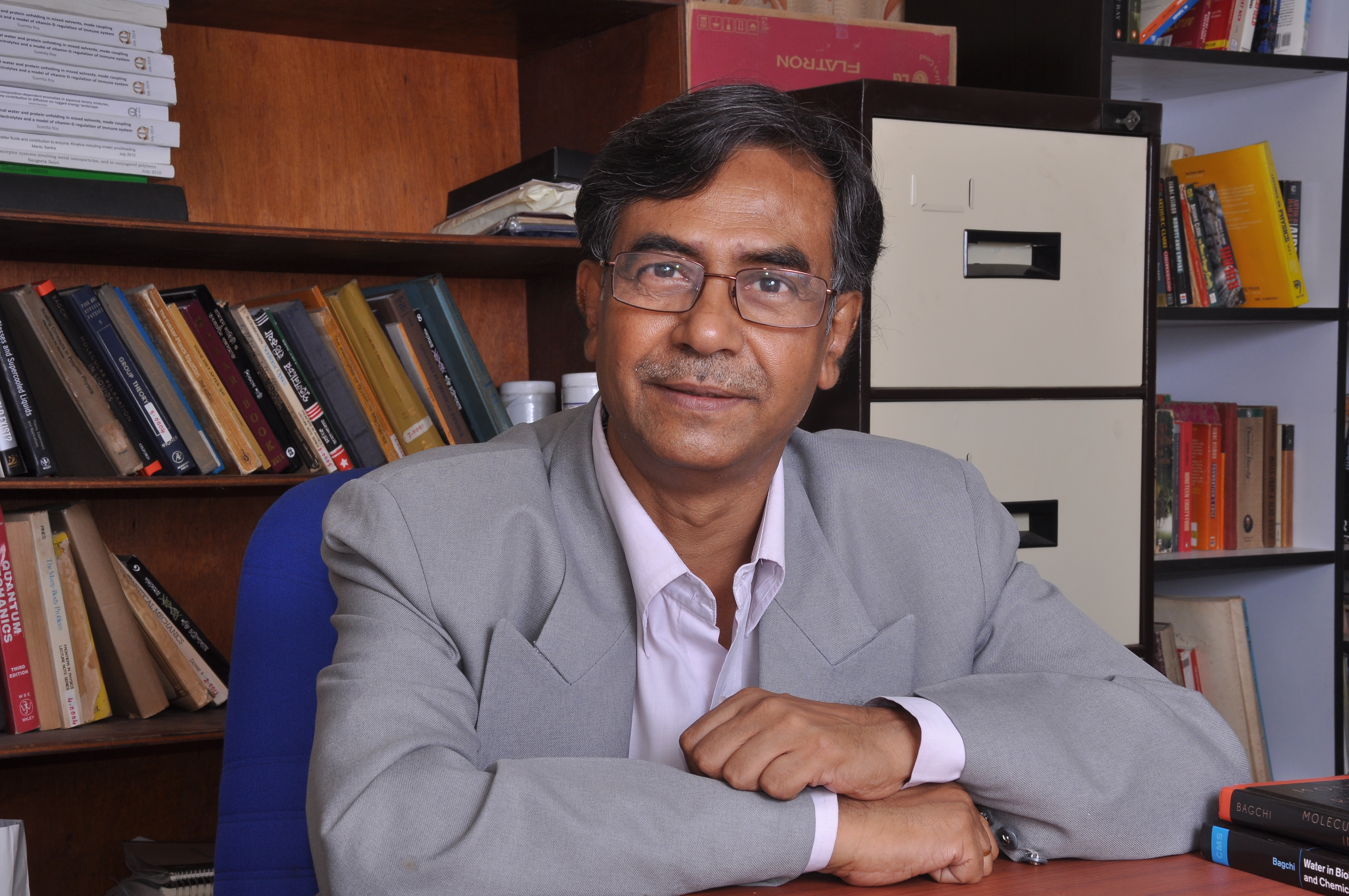
Biman Bagchi

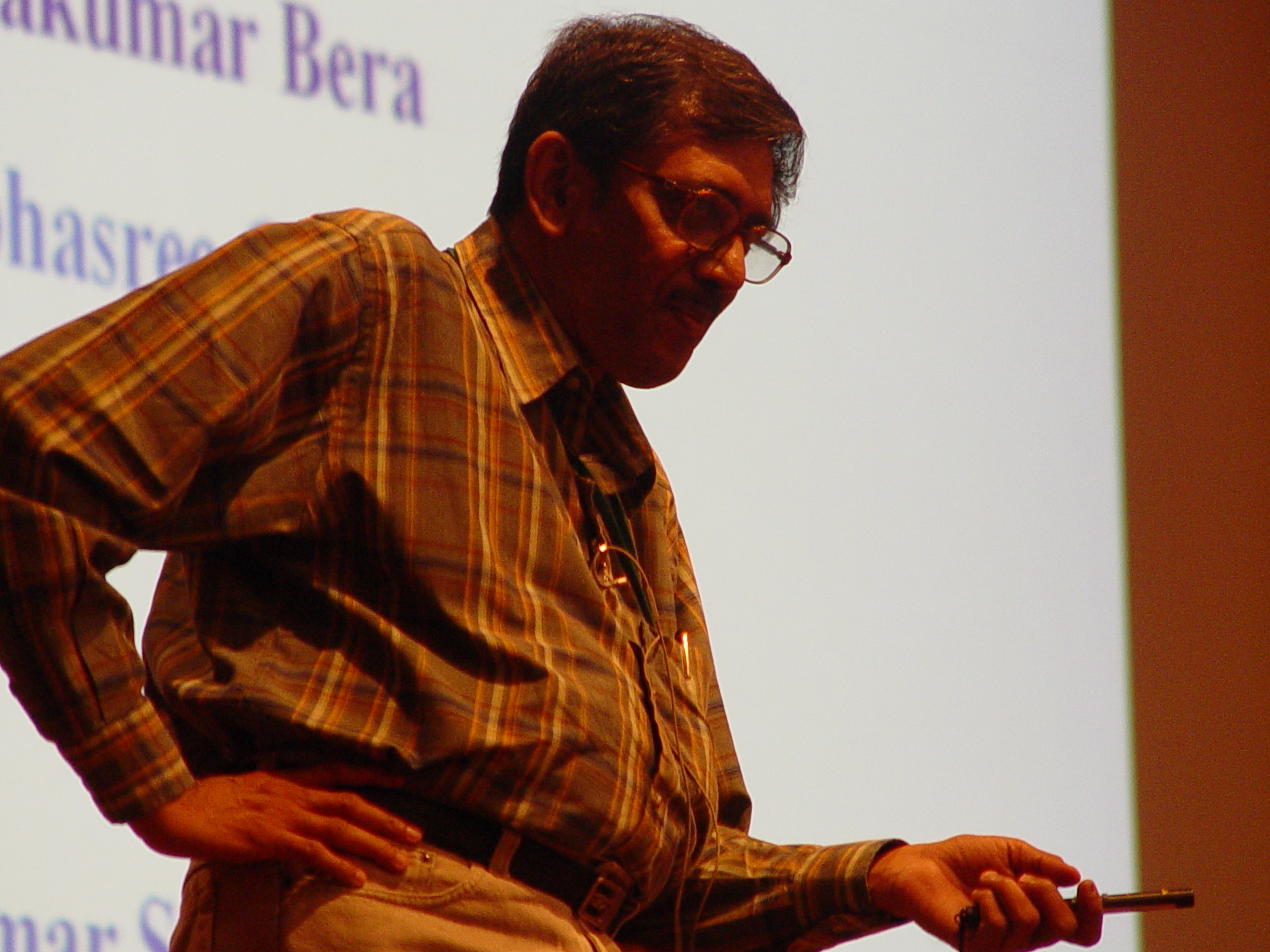
Debashis Mukherjee

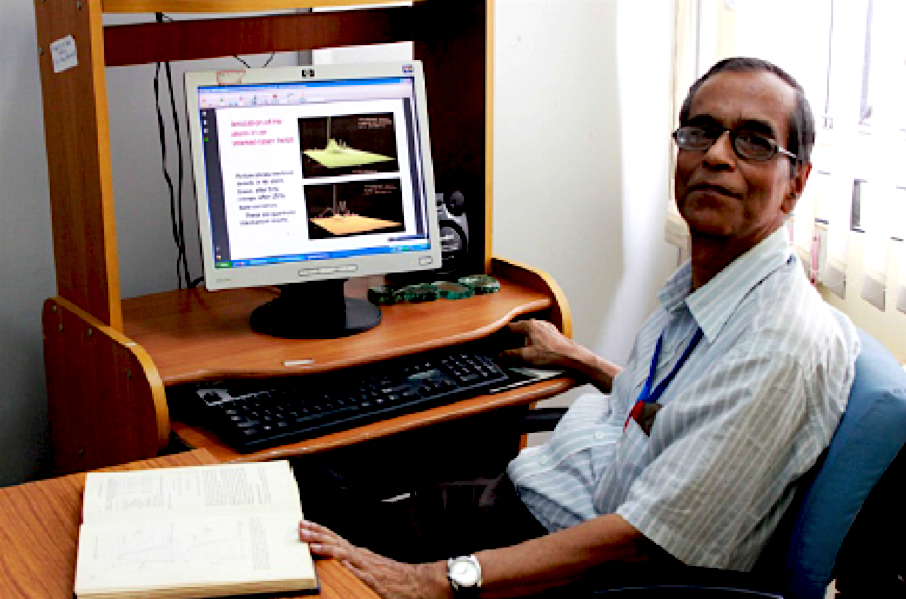
Bidyendu Mohan Deb

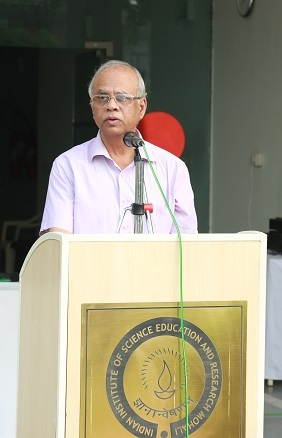
Narayanasami Sathyamurthy

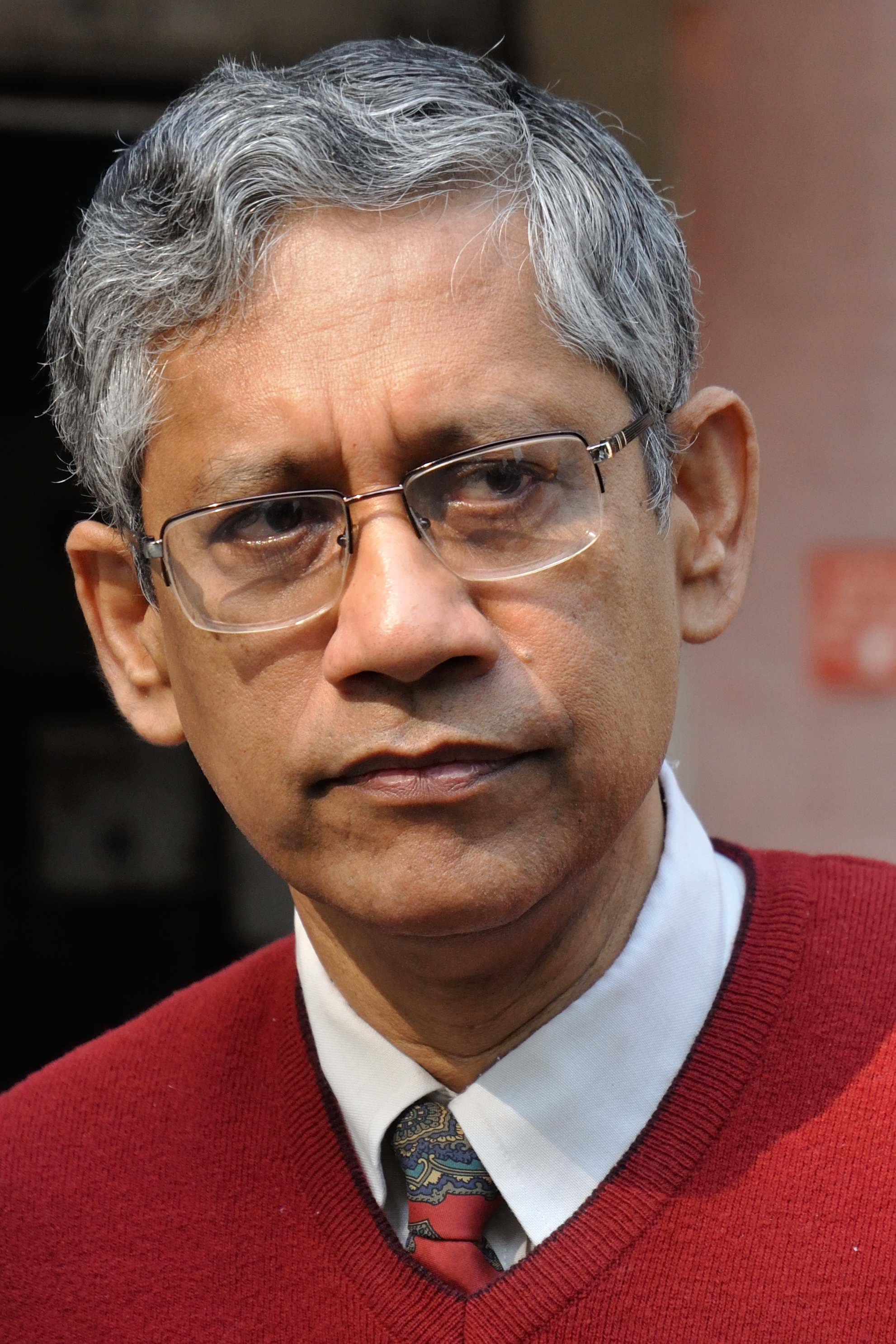
Santanu Bhattacharya

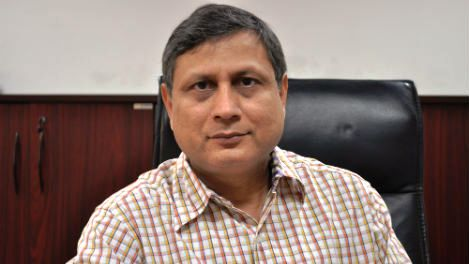
Vinod K. Singh

List of awardees, showing the year, place, and specialization
Year	Recipient	Place	Specialization
1960	T. R. Govindachari	Tamil Nadu	Bioorganic chemistry
1961	Asima Chatterjee	West Bengal	Phytomedicine
1962	Sasanka Chandra Bhattacharyya	West Bengal	Organic chemistry
1963	Bal Dattatreya Tilak	Maharashtra	Heterocyclic chemistry
1964	Sukh Dev	Punjab	Organic chemistry
1965	Sadhan Basu	West Bengal	Polymer chemistry
1965	Ram Charan Mehrotra	Uttar Pradesh	Organometallic chemistry
1966	N. A. Ramaiah	Andhra Pradesh	Sugar chemistry
1967	Mushi Santappa	Andhra Pradesh	Physical chemistry
1968	Chintamani Nagesa Ramachandra Rao	Karnataka	Solid state chemistry
1969	Amolak Chand Jain	Delhi	Bioorganic chemistry
1970	P. T. Narasimhan	USA	Theoretical chemistry
1971	Manojit Mohan Dhar	Uttar Pradesh	Medicinal chemistry
1972	A. P. B. Sinha	USA	Solid state chemistry
1972	Satinder Vir Kessar	Haryana	Organic chemistry
1973	Hirdaya Behari Mathur	Rajasthan	Spectroscopy
1973	Manapurathu Verghese George	Kerala	Photochemistry
1974	Usha Ranjan Ghatak	West Bengal	Stereochemistry
1974	Kuppuswamy Nagarajan	Tamil Nadu	Organic chemistry
1975	Dewan Singh Bhakuni	Uttar Pradesh	Medicinal chemistry
1975	Animesh Chakravorty	West Bengal	Inorganic chemistry
1976	Devadas Devaprabhakara	USA	Alicyclic chemistry
1977	Subramania Ranganathan	Andhra Pradesh	Organic chemistry
1977	Mihir Chowdhury	West Bengal	Spectroscopy
1978	Girjesh Govil	Maharashtra	Molecular biophysics
1978	Goverdhan Mehta	Rajasthan	Organic chemistry
1981	Dorairajan Balasubramanian	Tamil Nadu	Biochemistry
1981	Bidyendu Mohan Deb	West Bengal	Theoretical chemistry
1982	Chunni Lal Khetrapal	Uttar Pradesh	Chemical physics
1982	G. S. R. Subba Rao	Andhra Pradesh	Organic synthesis
1983	Naba Kishore Ray	Odisha	Computational chemistry
1983	Samaresh Mitra	West Bengal	Biological chemistry
1984	Paramasivam Natarajan	Tamil Nadu	Photochemistry
1984	Kalya Jagannath Rao	Karnataka	Nanomaterials
1986	Padmanabhan Balaram	Maharashtra	Biochemistry
1987	Debashis Mukherjee	West Bengal	Theoretical chemistry
1988	Kaushal Kishore	Uttar Pradesh	Polymer chemistry
1989	Srinivasan Chandrasekaran	Tamil Nadu	Organometallic chemistry
1989	Mihir Kanti Chaudhuri	Assam	Inorganic chemistry
1990	Narayanasami Sathyamurthy	Tamil Nadu	Theoretical chemistry
1990	B. M. Choudary	Andhra Pradesh	Nanomaterials
1991	Biman Bagchi	West Bengal	Biophysical chemistry
1991	Jhillu Singh Yadav	Andhra Pradesh	Agrochemistry
1992	Suryanarayanasastry Ramasesha	Karnataka	Molecular electronics
1992	Sumit Bhaduri	West Bengal	Organometallic chemistry
1993	Shridhar Ramachandra Gadre	Maharashtra	Theoretical chemistry
1993	Thirumalachari Ramasami	Tamil Nadu	Inorganic chemistry
1994	Dipankar Das Sarma	West Bengal	Solid state chemistry
1994	Eluvathingal Devassy Jemmis	Kerala	Theoretical chemistry
1995	Jayaraman Chandrasekhar	Karnataka	Computational chemistry
1995	Kizhakeyil Lukose Sebastian	Kerala	Theoretical chemistry
1996	Mariappan Periasamy	Tamil Nadu	Organic chemistry
1996	Narayanan Chandrakumar	Tamil Nadu	Physical chemistry
1997	Adusumilli Srikrishna	Andhra Pradesh	Organic chemistry
1997	Kankan Bhattacharyya	West Bengal	Laser spectroscopy
1998	Akhil Ranjan Chakravarty	West Bengal	Bioinorganic chemistry
1998	Krishna N. Ganesh	Karnataka	Bioorganic chemistry
1999	Ganesh Prasad Pandey	Uttar Pradesh	Organic chemistry
1999	Deb Shankar Ray	West Bengal	Spectroscopy
2000	Pradeep Mathur	Iran (Note: Born in Tehran)	Organometallic chemistry
2000	Sourav Pal	Maharashtra	Theoretical chemistry
2001	Uday Maitra	West Bengal	Supramolecular chemistry
2001	Tavarekere Kalliah Chandrashekar	Karnataka	Bioinorganic chemistry
2002	Tushar Kanti Chakraborty	West Bengal	Organic chemistry
2002	Murali Sastry	Tamil Nadu	Nanomaterials
2003	Santanu Bhattacharya	West Bengal	Chemical biology
2003	Vadapalli Chandrasekhar	Uttar Pradesh	Inorganic chemistry
2004	Siva Umapathy	Karnataka	Photochemistry
2004	Vinod K. Singh	Uttar Pradesh	Chiral ligand
2005	Samaresh Bhattacharya	West Bengal	Inorganic chemistry
2005	Subramaniam Ramakrishnan	Karnataka	Polymer chemistry
2006	Srinivasan Sampath	Karnataka	Electrochemistry
2006	K. George Thomas	Kerala	Photochemistry
2007	Amalendu Chandra	West Bengal	Fluid mechanics
2007	Ayyappanpillai Ajayaghosh	Kerala	Supramolecular chemistry
2008	Thalappil Pradeep	Kerala	Nanoparticles
2008	Jarugu Narasimha Moorthy	Andhra Pradesh	Organic chemistry
2009	Charusita Chakravarty	Delhi	Theoretical chemistry
2009	Narayanaswamy Jayaraman	Tamil Nadu	Organic chemistry
2010	Sandeep Verma	Uttar Pradesh	Bioorganic chemistry
2010	Swapan Kumar Pati	West Bengal	Magnetic phenomena
2011	Garikapati Narahari Sastry	Andhra Pradesh	Computational chemistry
2011	Balasubramanian Sundaram	Karnataka	Computational chemistry
2012	Gangadhar J. Sanjayan	Kerala	Bioorganic chemistry
2012	Govindasamy Mugesh	Tamil Nadu	Medicinal chemistry
2013	Yamuna Krishnan	Karnataka	Organic chemistry
2014	Souvik Maiti	West Bengal	Biophysical chemistry
2014	Kavirayani Ramakrishna Prasad	Karnataka	Organic chemistry
2015	D. Srinivasa Reddy	Andhra Pradesh	Medicinal chemistry
2015	Pradyut Ghosh	West Bengal	Inorganic chemistry
2016	Partha Sarathi Mukherjee	West Bengal	Supramolecular chemistry
2017	G. Naresh Patwari	Telangana	Spectroscopy
2018	Rahul Banerjee	West Bengal	Structural chemistry
2018	Swadhin Kumar Mandal	West Bengal	Organometallic chemistry
2019	Raghavan B. Sunoj	Kerala	Theoretical and computational organic chemistry
2019	Tapas Kumar Maji	West Bengal	Inorganic and material chemistry
2020	Subi George	Kerala	Supramolecular chemistry
2020	Jyotirmayee Dash	West Bengal	Organic synthesis and chemical biology
2021	Kanishka Biswas	West Bengal	Inorganic materials & solid state chemistry
2021	T Govindaraju	Karnataka	Bioorganic chemistry and chemical biology
2023	Akkattu T. Biju	Karnataka	Indian Institute of Science, Bengaluru
2023	Debabrata Maiti	West Bengal	Organometallic chemistry and bioinspired catalysis
2024	Vivek Polshettiwar	Maharashtra	Nanocatalysis for CCUS and solar energy harvesting
2024	Vishal Rai	Madhya Pradesh	Chemical methods for "precision engineering of proteins"

=== Earth, atmosphere, ocean, and planetary sciences ===
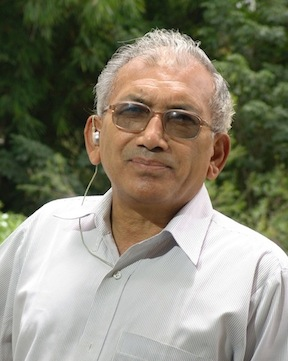
Khadg Singh Valdiya

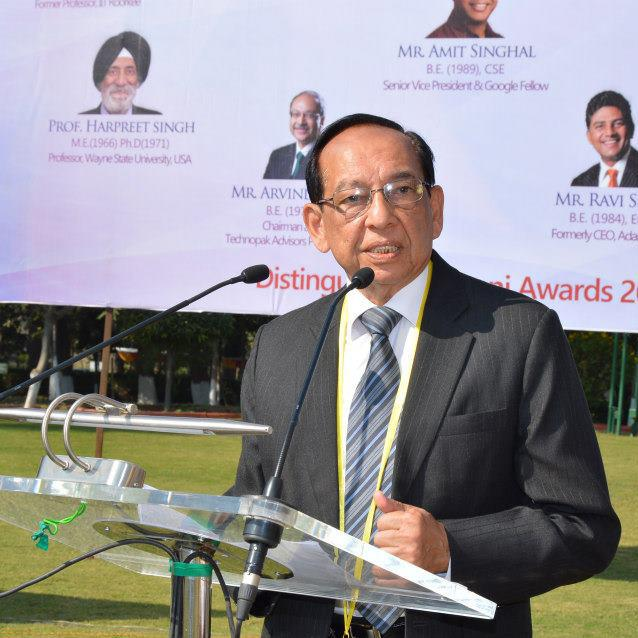
Harsh Gupta

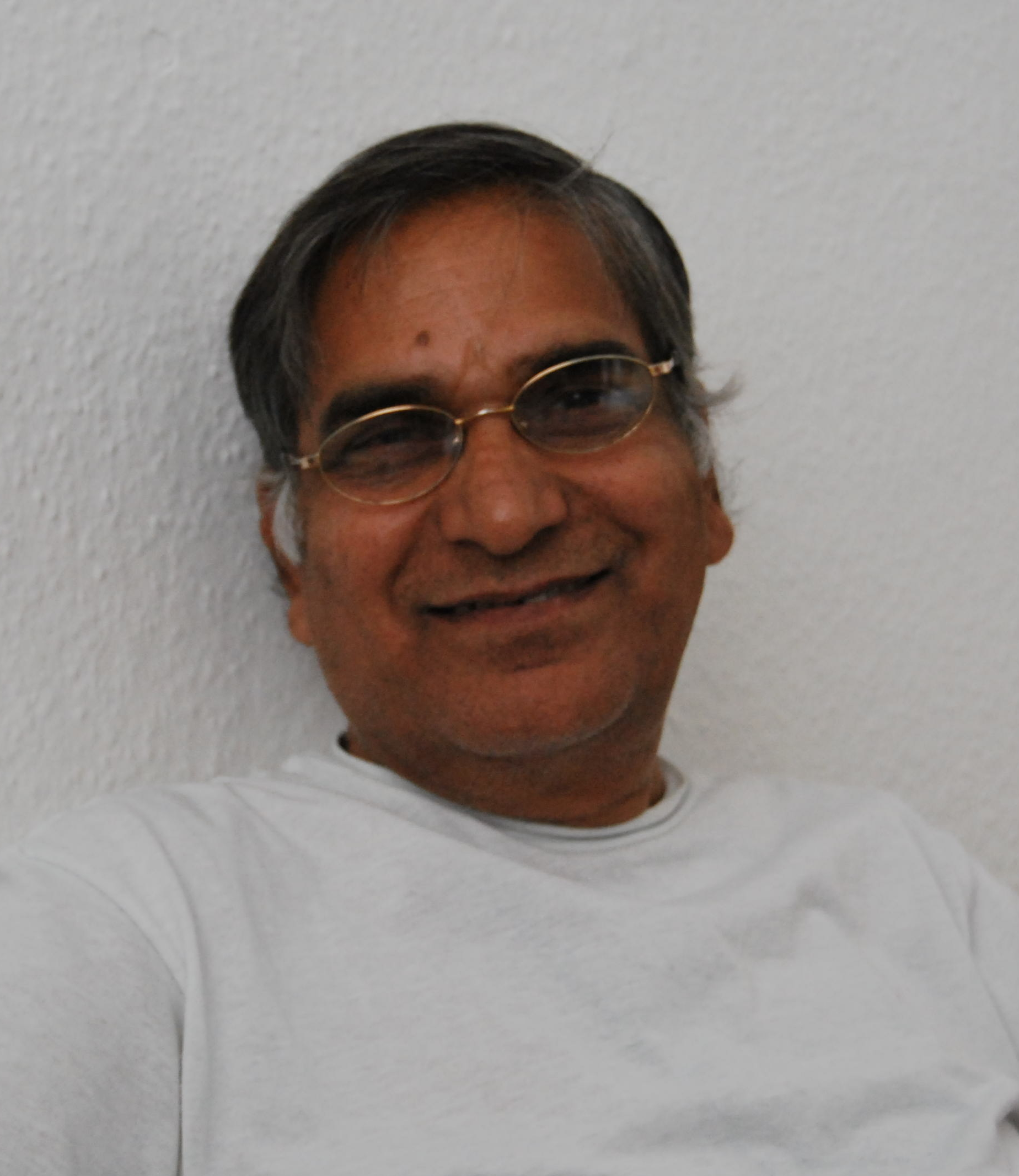
Sri Niwas

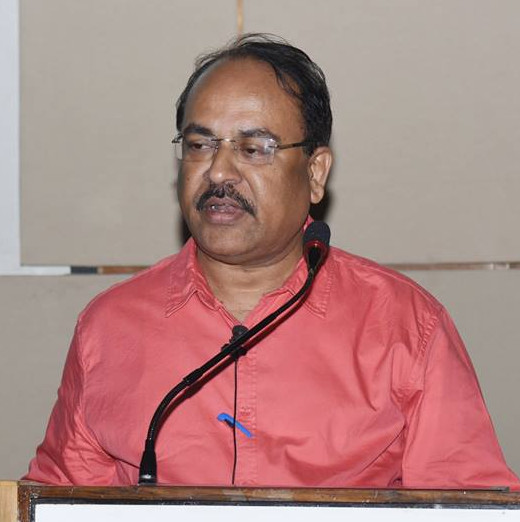
Rengaswamy Ramesh

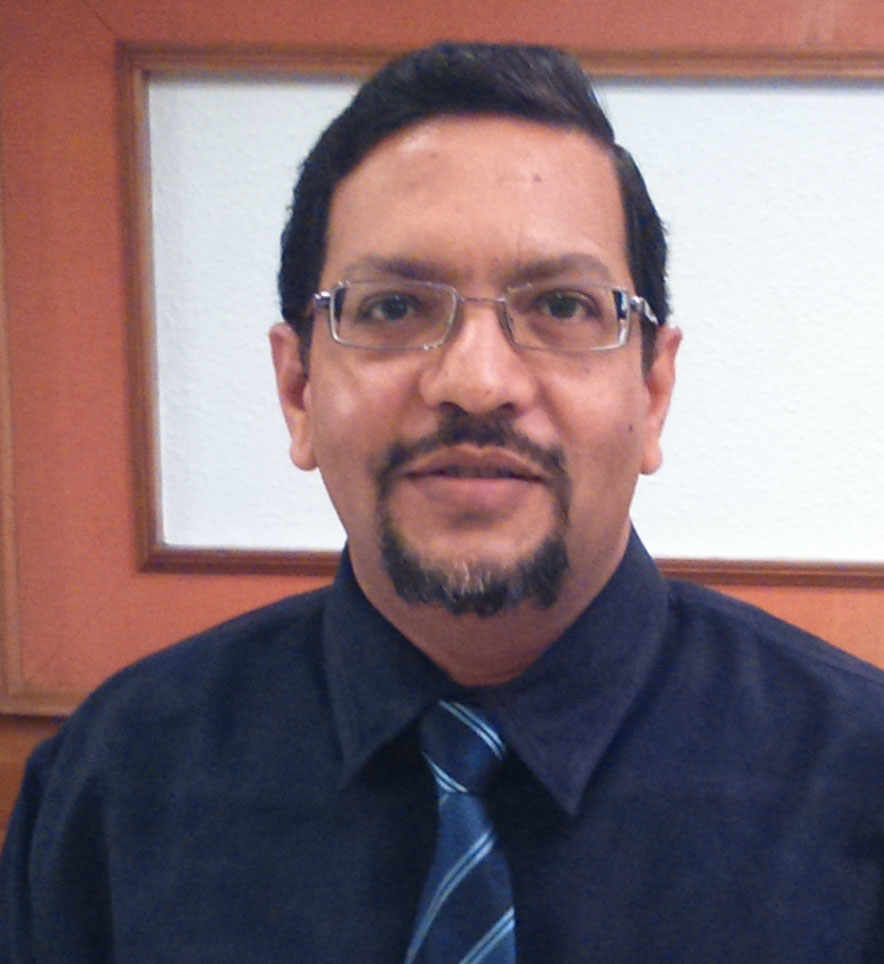
Anil Bhardwaj

List of awardees, showing the year, place, and specialization
Year	Recipient	Place	Specialization
1972	Kshitindramohan Naha	West Bengal	Precambrian geology
1976	Mihir Kumar Bose	West Bengal	Igneous petrology
1976	Khadg Singh Valdiya	Uttarakhand	Environmental geology
1977	Subir Kumar Ghosh	West Bengal	Structural geology
1977	Krishan Lal Kaila	Telangana	Seismology
1978	Hassan Nasiem Siddiquie	Uttar Pradesh	Marine geology
1978	B. L. K. Somayajulu	Andhra Pradesh	Geochemistry
1979	Vinod Kumar Gaur	Uttar Pradesh	Seismology
1980	Basanta Kumar Sahu	Odisha	Mathematical modelling
1980	Janardan Ganpatrao Negi	Maharashtra	Theoretical geophysics
1982	Kunchithapadam Gopalan	Tamil Nadu	Geochronology
1983	Syed Mahmood Naqvi	Telangana	Precambrian geology
1983	Harsh Gupta	Telangana	Seismology
1984	Sethunathasarma Krishnaswami	Kerala	Geochemistry
1984	Subhrangsu Kanta Acharyya	West Bengal	Geodynamics
1985	Rishi Narain Singh	Uttar Pradesh	Geophysical modelling
1986	Alok Krishna Gupta	West Bengal	Mineralogy
1986	Kumarendra Mallick	Odisha	Geophysics
1987	Pramod Sadasheo Moharir	Maharashtra	Signal processing
1988	Sampat Kumar Tandon	Delhi	Physical stratigraphy
1989	Prem Chand Pandey	Uttar Pradesh	Polar research, remote sensing
1991	Sudipta Sengupta	West Bengal	Structural geology
1991	Sri Niwas	Uttar Pradesh	Geophysics
1992	Satish Ramnath Shetye	Goa	Physical oceanography
1993	Uma Charan Mohanty	Odisha	Meteorology
1994	Jitendra Nath Goswami	Assam	Geochronology
1995	Bhupendra Nath Goswami	Assam	Meteorology
1996	Shyam Sundar Rai	Uttar Pradesh	Geophysics
1996	Syed Wajih Ahmad Naqvi	Uttar Pradesh	Biogeochemistry, greenhouse gases
1998	Rengaswamy Ramesh	Tamil Nadu	Palaeoclimatology
2001	Kolluru Sree Krishna	Andhra Pradesh	Marine geophysics
2001	Prashant Goswami	Assam	Atmospheric modelling
2002	Sankar Kumar Nath	West Bengal	Seismology
2002	Ganapati Shankar Bhat	Maharashtra	Atmospheric sciences
2003	Kanchan Pande	Uttaranchal	Isotope geology
2003	G. V. R. Prasad	Andhra Pradesh	Paleontology
2005	Nibir Mandal	West Bengal	Structural geology
2006	Pulak Sengupta	West Bengal	Metamorphic petrology
2006	Gufran-Ullah Beig	Maharashtra	Atmospheric sciences
2007	Anil Bhardwaj	Uttar Pradesh	Space science
2008	P. N. Vinayachandran	Kerala	Physical oceanography
2009	S. K. Satheesh	Kerala	Atmospheric aerosols
2011	Shankar Doraiswamy	Karnataka	Oceanography
2014	Sachchida Nand Tripathi	Uttar Pradesh	Atmospheric sciences
2015	Jyotiranjan Srichandan Ray	Odisha	Geochemistry
2016	Sunil Kumar Singh	Gujarat	Geochemistry
2017	S. Suresh Babu	Kerala	Atmospheric aerosols
2018	Parthasarathi Chakraborty	West Bengal	Environmental geochemistry
2018	Madineni Venkat Ratnam	Andhra Pradesh	Atmospheric sciences
2019	Subimal Ghosh	Maharashtra	Indian monsoon, hydro-meteorology and hydrology
2020	Abhijit Mukherjee	West Bengal	Hydrogeology, water policy
2020	Suryendu Dutta	West Bengal	Organic geochemistry
2021	Binoy Kumar Saikia	Assam	Coal and atmospheric aerosol chemistry
2022	Vimal Mishra	Uttar Pradesh	Hydrology, climate change, water resources
2024	Roxy Koll	Kerala	Climate change, extreme weather events
2025	Waliur Rehaman	Goa	

=== Engineering sciences ===
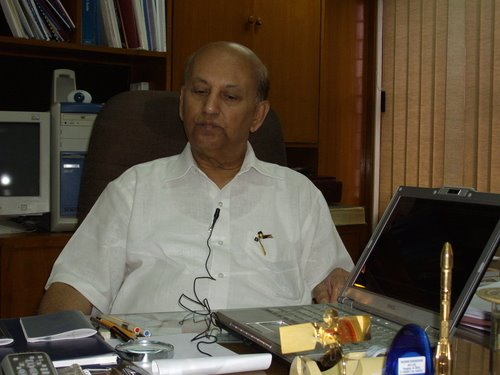
U. R. Rao

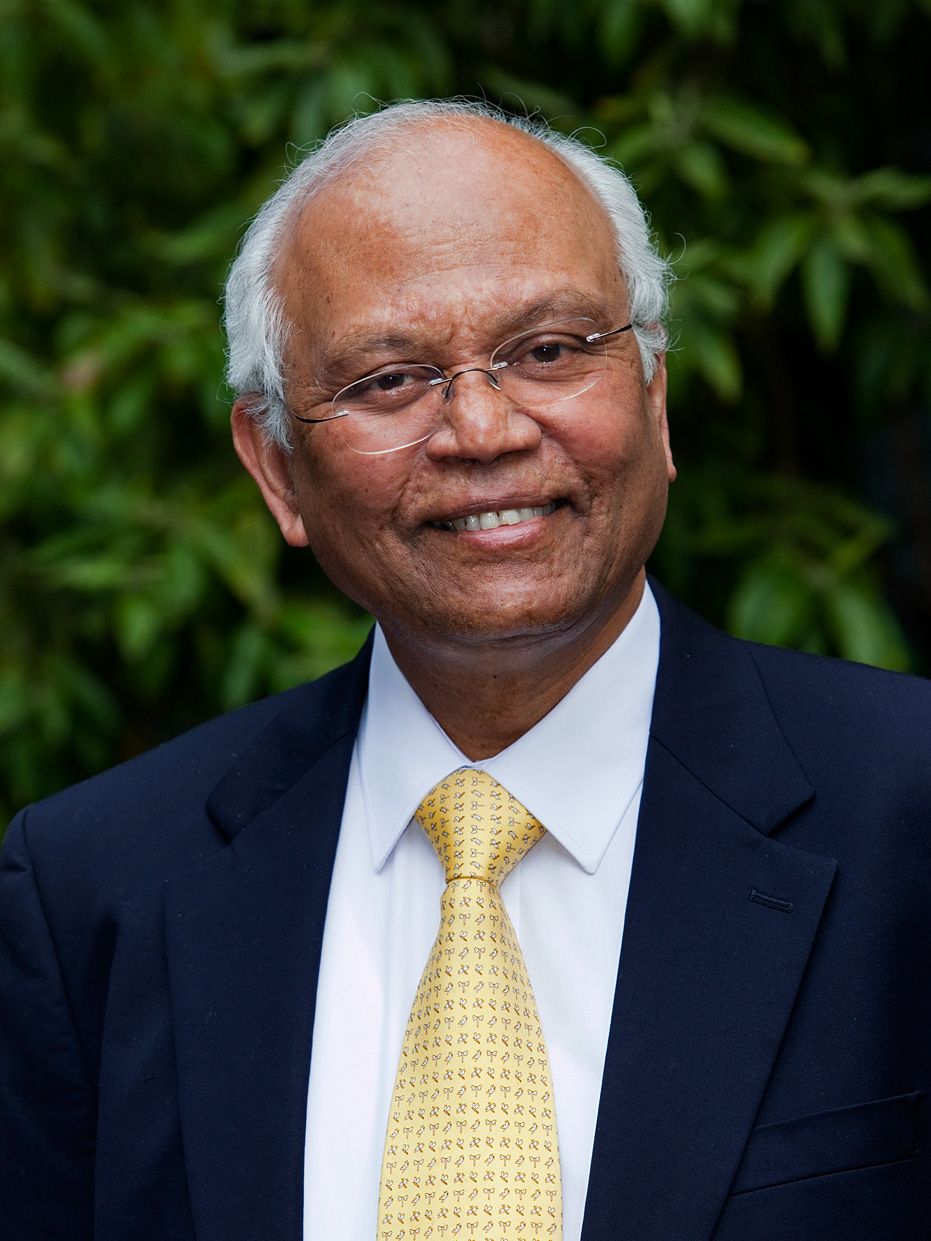
Raghunath Mashelkar

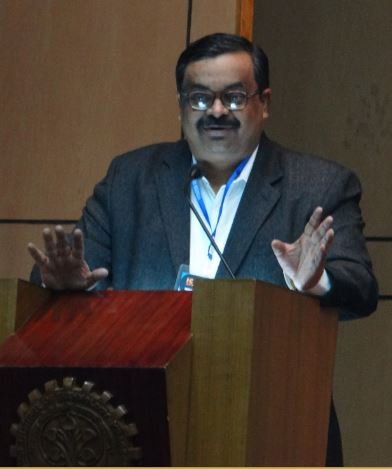
Partha Pratim Chakraborty

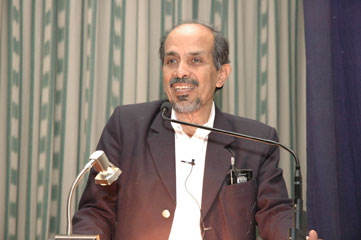
Roddam Narasimha

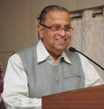
V. Rajaraman

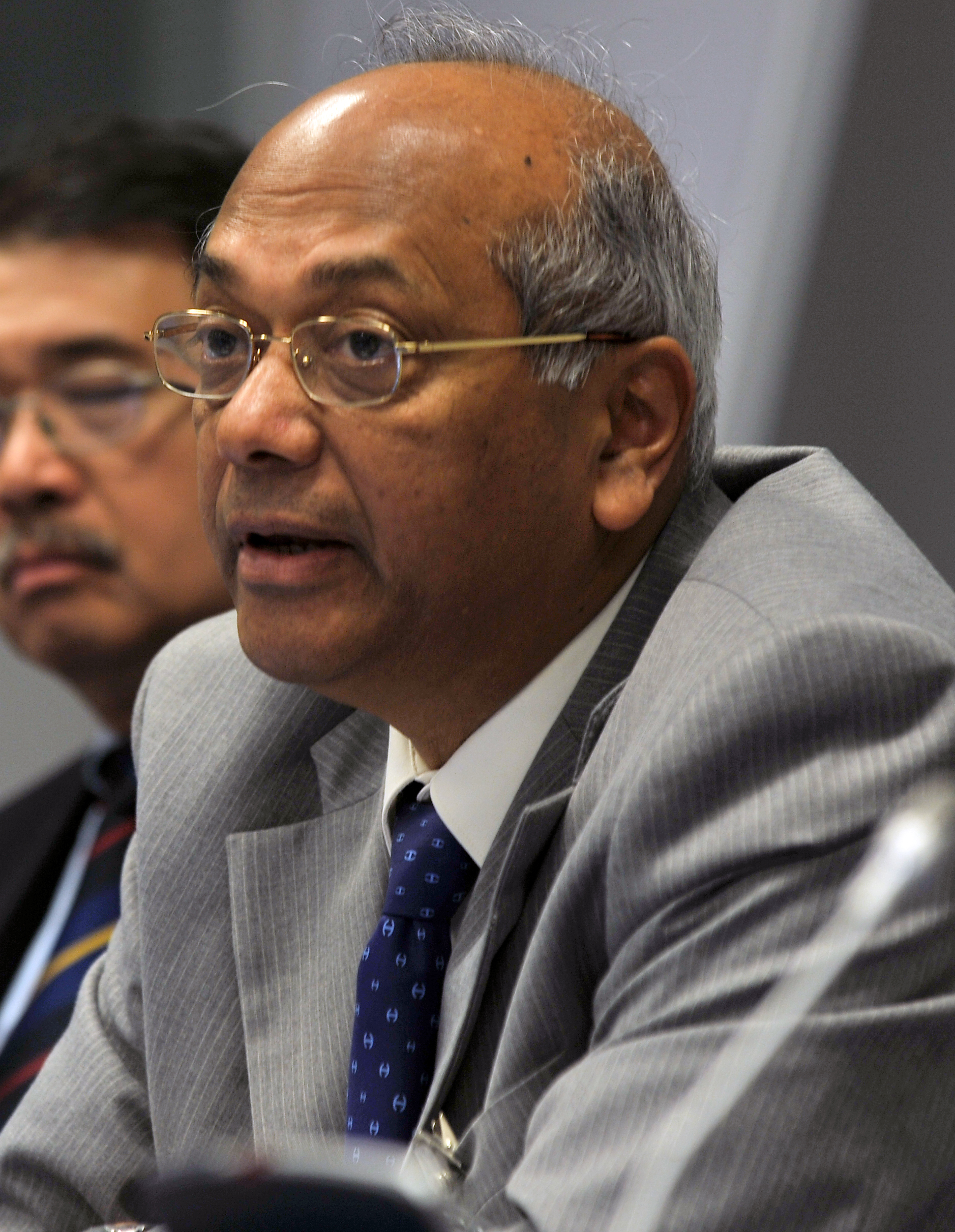
Srikumar Banerjee

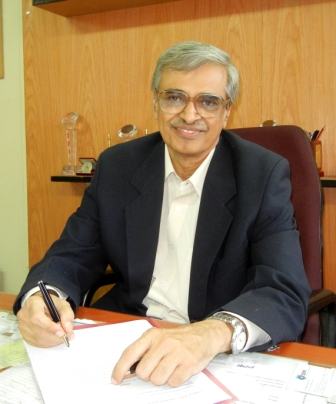
Kamanio Chattopadhyay

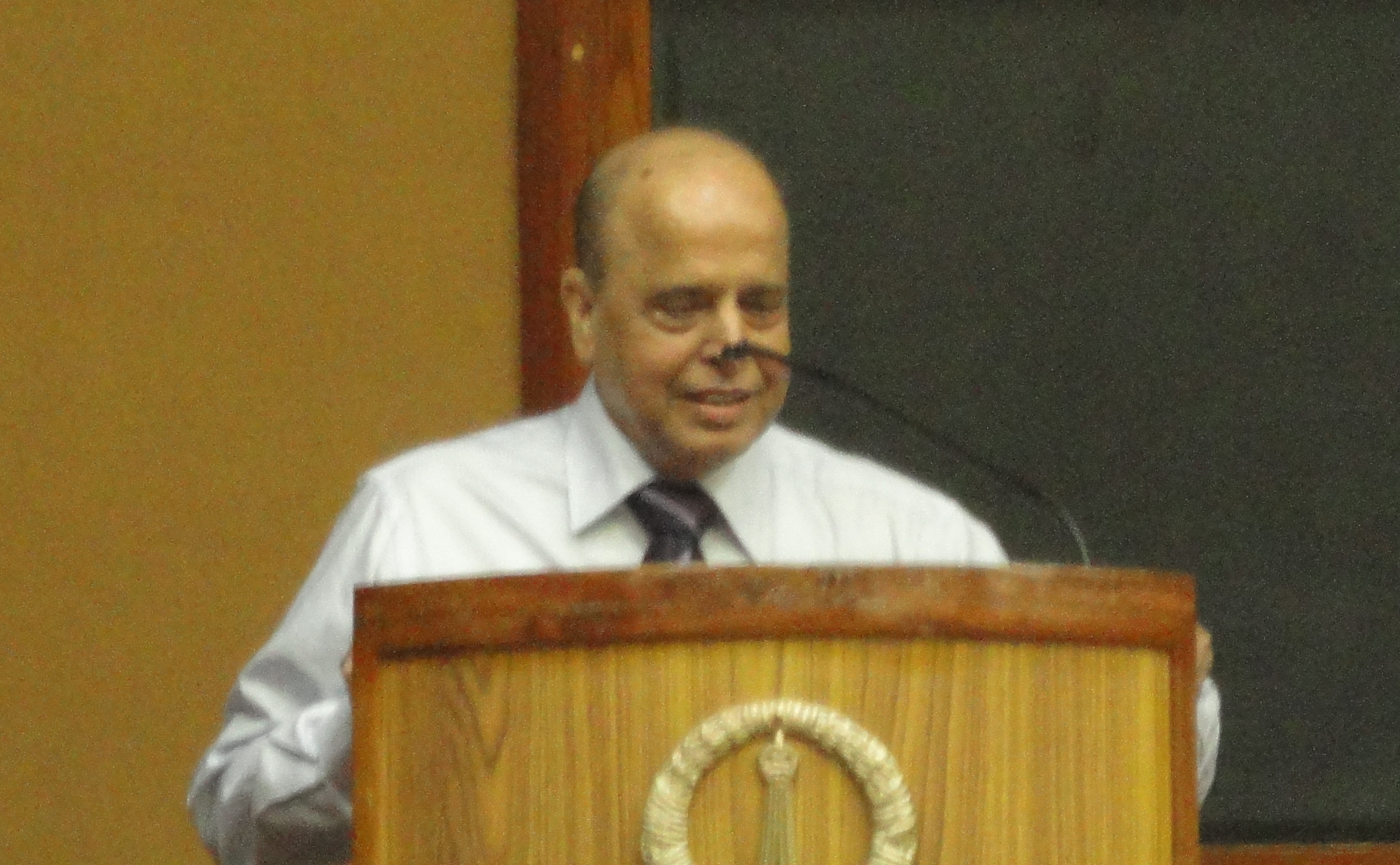
K. Kasturirangan

Patcha Ramachandra Rao

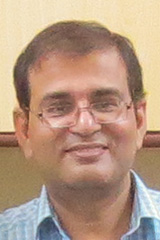
Subhasis Chaudhuri

List of awardees, showing the year, place, and specialization
Year	Recipient	Place	Specialization
1960	Homi Nusserwanji Sethna	Maharashtra	Chemical engineering
1962	Man Mohan Suri	Punjab	Suri-transmission
1963	Brahm Prakash	Punjab	Metallurgy
1964	Bal Raj Nijhawan	Uttar Pradesh	Metallurgical engineering
1965	Ayyagari Sambasiva Rao	Telangana	Electronic engineering
1966	Jai Krishna	Uttar Pradesh	Earthquake engineering
1967	Tanjore Ramachandra Anantharaman	Tamil Nadu	Metallurgy
1968	Kshitish Ranjan Chakravorty	West Bengal	Fertilizer science
1971	Amitabha Bhattacharyya	Sikkim	Production engineering
1972	Govind Swarup	Uttar Pradesh	Radio astronomy
1972	Rajindar Pal Wadhwa	Delhi	Microwave engineering
1973	Man Mohan Sharma	Rajasthan	Chemical engineering
1974	Roddam Narasimha	Karnataka	Fluid dynamics
1974	Mangalore Anantha Pai	Karnataka	Power systems
1975	Udipi Ramachandra Rao	Karnataka	Space science
1976	Rajinder Kumar	Punjab	Multiphase phenomena
1976	Vaidyeswaran Rajaraman	Tamil Nadu	Computer science
1978	Digvijai Singh	Uttar Pradesh	Fluid-film lubrication
1978	S. N. Seshadri	Kerala	Control systems
1979	Palle Rama Rao	Andhra Pradesh	Metallurgy
1980	Vallampadugai Srinivasa Raghavan Arunachalam	Karnataka	Materials science
1981	S. C. Dutta Roy	West Bengal	Signal processing
1982	Raghunath Anant Mashelkar	Goa	Chemical engineering
1983	Suhas Pandurang Sukhatme	Maharashtra	Heat transfer
1983	Krishnaswamy Kasturirangan	Kerala	Space science
1984	D. D. Bhawalkar	Madhya Pradesh	Optical physics
1984	Paul Ratnasamy	Tamil Nadu	Catalysis
1985	Patcha Ramachandra Rao	Uttar Pradesh	Metallurgy
1986	Manohar Lal Munjal	Punjab	Sound engineering
1987	Shrikant Lele	Uttar Pradesh	Computational thermodynamics
1988	Surendra Prasad	Delhi	Signal processing
1988	B. D. Kulkarni	Maharashtra	Chemical reaction engineering
1989	Gundabathula Venkateswara Rao	Kerala	Finite element methods
1989	Srikumar Banerjee	West Bengal	Metallurgy
1990	Sankar Kumar Pal	West Bengal	Fuzzy neural network
1990	Gangan Prathap	Singapore	Structural mechanics
1991	Jyeshtharaj Joshi	Maharashtra	Nuclear science
1992	Vivek Borkar	Maharashtra	Stochastic control
1993	Dipankar Banerjee	West Bengal	Metallurgy
1993	Suresh Kumar Bhatia	Australia (Note: Based in Australia)	Catalysis
1994	Govindan Sundararajan	Andhra Pradesh	Surface engineering
1995	Kamanio Chattopadhyay	West Bengal	Physical metallurgy
1997	Devang Vipin Khakhar	Maharashtra	Polymer processing
1998	Anurag Sharma	Delhi	Photonics
1998	Ashok Jhunjhunwala	West Bengal	Telecommunications
1999	Ramarathnam Narasimhan	Tamil Nadu	Fracture mechanics
2000	Viswanathan Kumaran	Tamil Nadu	Fluid dynamics
2000	Partha Pratim Chakraborty	West Bengal	Computer science
2002	Ashutosh Sharma	Rajasthan	Chemical engineering
2003	Atul Chokshi	Karnataka	Materials engineering
2003	Soumitro Banerjee	West Bengal	Bifurcation theory
2004	Subhasis Chaudhuri	West Bengal	Image processing
2004	Vivek Ranade	Maharashtra	Fluid dynamics
2005	V. Ramgopal Rao	Andhra Pradesh	Nanoelectronics
2005	Kalyanmoy Deb	Tripura	Computer science
2006	Ashish Kishore Lele	Maharashtra	Polymer dynamics
2006	Sanjay Mittal	Uttar Pradesh	Computational fluid dynamics
2007	Rama Govindarajan	Telangana	Fluid dynamics
2007	B. S. Murty	Tamil Nadu	Metallurgy
2008	Ranjan Mallik	West Bengal	Electrical communication engineering
2009	Giridhar Madras	Karnataka	Polymer engineering
2009	Jayant Haritsa	Karnataka	Computer science
2010	G. K. Ananthasuresh	Andhra Pradesh	Topology optimization
2010	Sanghamitra Bandyopadhyay	West Bengal	Computer science
2011	Sirshendu De	West Bengal	Chemical engineering
2011	Upadrasta Ramamurty	Andhra Pradesh	Materials engineering
2012	N. Ravishankar	Karnataka	Nanostructured materials
2012	Shanthi Pavan	Tamil Nadu	VLSI design
2013	Bikramjit Basu	West Bengal	Ceramic engineering
2013	Suman Chakraborty	West Bengal	Nanofluids
2014	S. Venkata Mohan	Andhra Pradesh	Environmental engineering
2014	Soumen Chakrabarti	West Bengal	Computer science
2015	Yogesh M. Joshi	Maharashtra	Rheology
2016	Avinash Kumar Agarwal	Rajasthan	Mechanical engineering
2016	Venkata Padmanabhan	Karnataka	Computer science
2017	Aloke Paul	West Bengal	Materials engineering
2017	Neelesh B. Mehta	Karnataka	Wireless communications
2018	Amit Agrawal	Maharashtra	Fluid mechanics
2018	Ashwin Gumaste	Mahrashtra	Telecom networks
2019	Manik Varma	Delhi	Machine learning, computer vision and computational advertising
2020	Amol Arvindrao Kulkarni	Maharashtra	Multiphase reactors and microreactors
2020	Kinshuk Dasgupta	West Bengal	Material science, nanotechnology
2021	Debdeep Mukhopadhyay	West Bengal	Computer science
2022	Dipti Ranjan Sahoo	Odisha	Civil engineering
2022	Rajnish Kumar	Tamil Nadu	Gas hydrates, clathrate hydrates, chemical engineering
2024	Dr. Abhilash		Engineering Science
2024	Radhakrishna Ganti		Civil engineering

=== Mathematical sciences ===
K. S. Chandrasekharan	K. R. Parthasarathy	K. G. Ramanathan	C. S. Seshadri	M. S. Narasimhan	C. R. Rao
R. Sridharan	J. K. Ghosh	Gopal Prasad	S. G. Dani	N. Mohan Kumar	Rajendra Bhatia
R. L. Karandikar	T. N. Venkataramana	Dipendra Prasad	Manindra Agrawal	Sujatha Ramdorai	K. H. Paranjape
B. V. Rajarama Bhat	Suresh Venapally	Raman Parimala			

List of awardees, showing the year, place, and specialization
Year	Recipient	Place	Specialization
1959	K. S. Chandrasekharan	Andhra Pradesh	Number theory
1959	Calyampudi Radhakrishna Rao	Karnataka	Cramér–Rao bound
1965	Kollagunta Gopalaiyer Ramanathan	Andhra Pradesh	Number theory
1972	C. S. Seshadri	Tamil Nadu	Algebraic geometry
1972	Anadi Sankar Gupta	West Bengal	Fluid dynamics
1975	Padam Chand Jain	Delhi	Numerical solutions
1975	Mudumbai Seshachalu Narasimhan	Karnataka	Narasimhan–Seshadri theorem
1976	Kalyanapuram Rangachari Parthasarathy	Tamil Nadu	Quantum stochastic calculus
1976	S.K. Trehan	Punjab	Force-free magnetic field
1977	Madabusi Santanam Raghunathan	Andhra Pradesh	Lie groups
1978	E. M. V. Krishnamurthy	Tamil Nadu	Fast division algorithm
1979	S. Ramanan	Tamil Nadu	Algebraic geometry
1979	Srinivasacharya Raghavan	Tamil Nadu	Number theory
1980	Ramaiyengar Sridharan	Tamil Nadu	Filtered algebra
1981	Jayanta Kumar Ghosh	West Bengal	Bayesian inference
1982	B. L. S. Prakasa Rao	Andhra Pradesh	Statistical inference
1982	Jang Bahadur Shukla	Uttar Pradesh	Mathematical modelling
1983	Phoolan Prasad	Uttar Pradesh	Partial differential equations
1983	Inder Bir Singh Passi	Punjab	Group theory
1985	Rajagopalan Parthasarathy	Tamil Nadu	Blattner's conjecture
1985	Surender Kumar Malik	Haryana	Nonlinear phenomena
1986	Thiruvenkatachari Parthasarathy	Tamil Nadu	Game theory
1986	Udai Bhan Tewari	Uttar Pradesh	Group algebra
1987	Tarlok Nath Shorey	Maharashtra	Number theory
1987	Raman Parimala	Tamil Nadu	Algebra
1988	Mihir Baran Banerjee	Himachal Pradesh	Hydrodynamics
1988	Kalyan Bidhan Sinha	West Bengal	Mathematical theory of scattering
1989	Gopal Prasad	Uttar Pradesh	Lie groups
1990	Ramachandran Balasubramanian	Tamil Nadu	Riemann zeta function
1990	Shrikrishna Gopalrao Dani	Karnataka	Ergodic theory
1991	Vikram Bhagvandas Mehta	Maharashtra	Frobenius split
1991	Annamalai Ramanathan	Tamil Nadu	Frobenius splitting
1992	Maithili Sharan	Rajasthan	Mathematical modelling
1993	Navin M. Singhi	Maharashtra	Combinatorics
1993	Karmeshu	Delhi	Mathematical modelling
1994	Neithalath Mohan Kumar	Kerala	Commutative algebra
1995	Rajendra Bhatia	Delhi	Matrix function
1996	Vaikalathur Shankar Sunder	Tamil Nadu	Subfactor
1998	Trivandrum Ramakrishnan Ramadas	Tamil Nadu	Algebraic geometry
1998	Subhashis Nag	West Bengal	String theory
1999	Rajeeva Laxman Karandikar	Madhya Pradesh	Probability theory
2000	Rahul Mukerjee	West Bengal	Statistics
2001	Tyakal Nanjundiah Venkataramana	Karnataka	Algebraic groups
2001	Gadadhar Misra	Odisha	Operator theory
2002	Sundaram Thangavelu	Tamil Nadu	Harmonic analysis
2002	Dipendra Prasad	Maharashtra	Number theory
2003	Manindra Agrawal	Uttar Pradesh	AKS primality test
2003	Vasudevan Srinivas	Karnataka	Algebraic geometry
2004	Sujatha Ramdorai	Karnataka	Iwasawa theory
2004	Arup Bose	West Bengal	Sequential analysis
2005	Probal Chaudhuri	West Bengal	Quantile regression
2005	Kapil Hari Paranjape	Maharashtra	Algebraic geometry
2006	Vikraman Balaji	Tamil Nadu	Algebraic geometry
2006	Indranil Biswas	Maharashtra	Algebraic geometry
2007	B. V. Rajarama Bhat	West Bengal	Operator theory
2008	Jaikumar Radhakrishnan	Maharashtra	Combinatorics
2009	Suresh Venapally	Telangana	Algebra
2011	Mahan Mitra	West Bengal	Hyperbolic geometry
2011	Palash Sarkar	West Bengal	Cryptology
2012	Siva Athreya	Karnakata	Probability theory
2012	Debashish Goswami	West Bengal	Noncommutative geometry
2013	Eknath Prabhakar Ghate	Maharashtra	Number theory
2014	Kaushal Kumar Verma	Karnataka	Complex analysis
2015	K. Sandeep	Karnataka	Elliptic partial differential equation
2015	Ritabrata Munshi	West Bengal	Number theory
2016	Amlendu Krishna	Maharashtra	Algebraic geometry
2016	Naveen Garg	Delhi	Theoretical computer science
2017	(Not awarded.)		
2018	Amit Kumar	Delhi	Theoretical computer science
2018	Nitin Saxena	Uttar Pradesh	Theoretical computer science
2019	Dishant Mayurbhai Pancholi	Gujarat	Contact and symplectic topology
2019	Neena Gupta	West Bengal	Commutative algebra and affine algebraic geometry
2020	Rajat Subhra Hazra	West Bengal	Operator algebra and extreme value theory
2020	U. K. Anandavardhanan	Kerala	Number theory
2021	Anish Ghosh	Maharashtra	
2021	Saket Saurabh	Tamil Nadu	
2022	Apoorva Khare	Karnataka	
2022	Neeraj Kayal	Karnataka	
2024	Mahesh Kakde		Mathematics and Computer science

=== Medical sciences ===
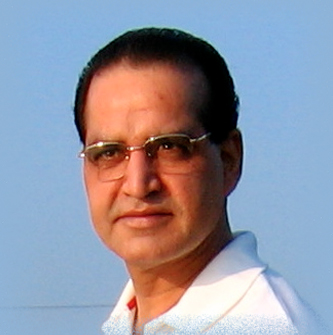
Anil Kumar Tyagi

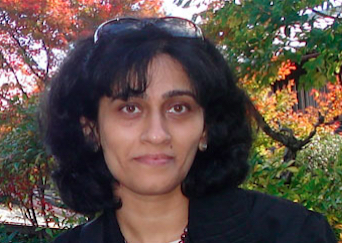
Vidita Vaidya

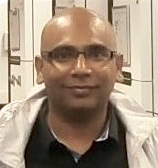
Amit Dutt

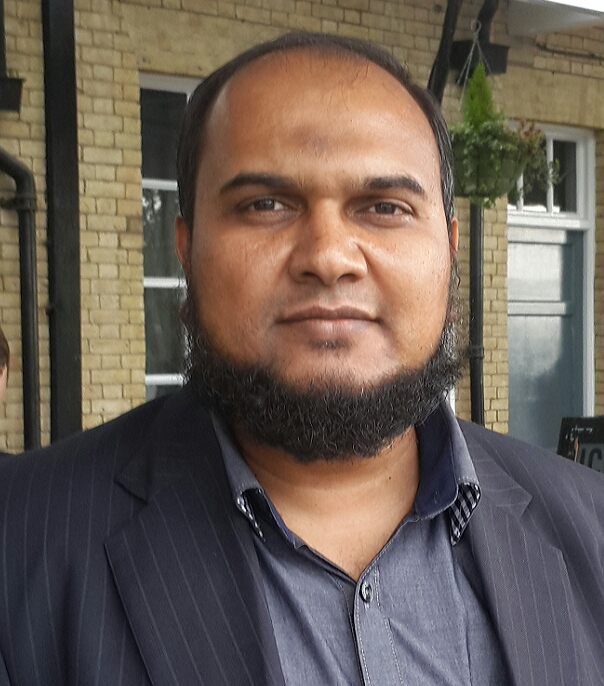
Niyaz Ahmed

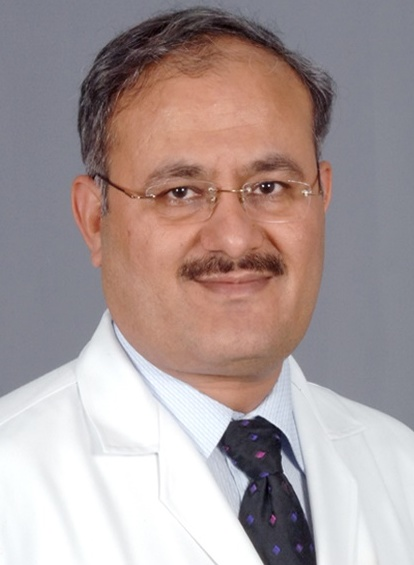
V. S. Sangwan

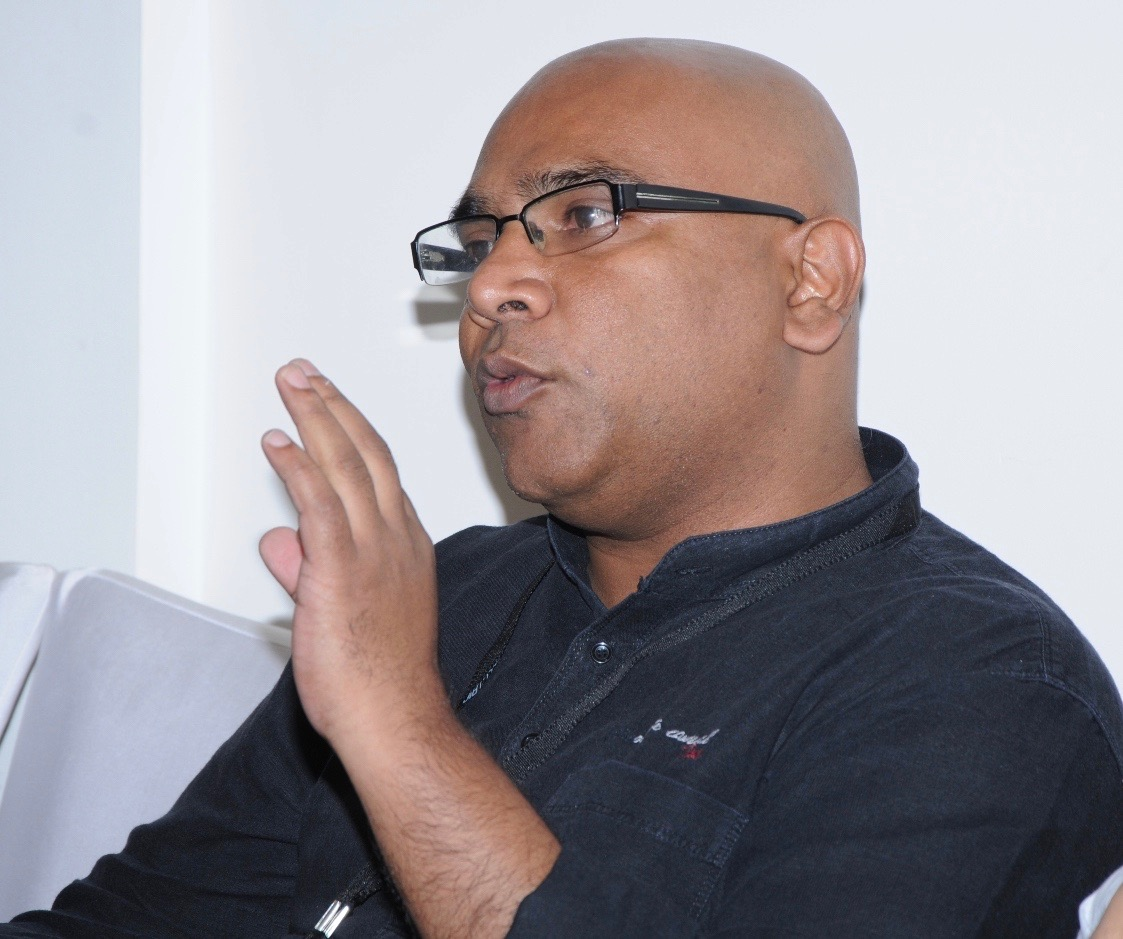
Amit Dutt

List of awardees, showing the year, place, and specialization
Year	Recipient	Place	Specialization
1961	Ram Behari Arora	Rajasthan	Cardiovascular pharmacology
1963	Bal Krishan Anand	Uttar Pradesh	Neurophysiology
1963	Sibte Hasan Zaidi	Uttar Pradesh	Toxicology
1965	Vulimiri Ramalingaswami	Andhra Pradesh	Pathology
1965	Nirmal Kumar Dutta	West Bengal	Microbiology
1966	Jyoti Bhusan Chatterjea	West Bengal	Haemoglobinopathy
1966	Rustom Jal Vakil	Maharashtra	Cardiology
1967	M. J. Thirumalachar	USA	Mycology
1967	Ajit Kumar Basu	West Bengal	Cardiac surgery
1968	Uttamchand Khimchand Sheth	Maharashtra	Neurobiology
1968	Sarashi Ranjan Mukherjee	West Bengal	Pharmacology
1969	Ranjit Roy Chaudhury	Bihar	Pharmacology
1969	Subramanian Kalyanaraman	Tamil Nadu	Neurosurgery
1960	Janak Raj Talwar	Punjab	Cardiothoracic surgery
1960	Ajit Kumar Maiti	West Bengal	Neurophysiology
1960	Om Dutt Gulati	Gujarat	Pharmacology
1960	Nuggehalli Raghuveer Moudgal	Karnataka	Endocrinology
1960	Turaga Desiraju	Andhra Pradesh	Neurophysiology
1960	Perdur Radhakantha Adiga	Karnataka	Reproductive biology
1981	U. C. Chaturvedi	Uttar Pradesh	Virology
1983	Indira Nath	Delhi	Immunology
1984	Jagdish Narain Sinha	Uttar Pradesh	Neuropharmacology
1984	Brahm Shanker Srivastava	Uttar Pradesh	Molecular biology
1985	D. K. Ganguly	West Bengal	Neurophysiology
1986	Shyam Swarup Agarwal	Uttar Pradesh	Immunology
1986	Pradeep Seth	Delhi	Microbiology
1990	Maharaj Kishan Bhan	Haryana	Pediatrics
1991	Shashi Wadhwa	Madhya Pradesh	Neurobiology
1992	Undurti Narasimha Das	Andhra Pradesh	Immunology
1992	Narinder Kumar Mehra	Punjab	Immunogenetics
1993	Gaya Prasad Pal	Madhya Pradesh	Clinical anatomy
1994	Y. D. Sharma	Delhi	Molecular biology
1994	K. B. Sainis	Maharashtra	Immunology
1995	Anil Kumar Tyagi	Uttar Pradesh	Biochemistry
1995	Subrat Kumar Panda	Odisha	Virology
1996	Vijayalakshmi Ravindranath	Tamil Nadu	Neurosciences
1996	Shiv Kumar Sarin	Rajasthan	Hepatology
1997	Satish K. Gupta	Haryana	Immunology
1997	Vijay Kumar	Bihar	Molecular biology
1998	G. Balakrish Nair	Kerala	Microbiology
1999	Ch. Mohan Rao	Andhra Pradesh	Molecular biology
2000	Shahid Jameel	Uttar Pradesh	Virology
2001	Birendra Nath Mallick	West Bengal	Neurobiology
2002	Sunil Pradhan	Uttar Pradesh	Neurology
2003	Chinmoy Sankar Dey	West Bengal	Molecular biology
2003	Anil Kumar Mandal	West Bengal	Glaucoma
2004	Chetan Eknath Chitnis	Maharashtra	Parasitology
2005	Javed Agrewala	Uttar Pradesh	Immunology
2006	V. S. Sangwan	Haryana	Cell biology
2007	P. N. Rangarajan	Karnataka	Gene expression
2008	Ravinder Goswami	Delhi	Endocrinology
2009	Santosh G. Honavar	Maharashtra	Ocular oncology
2010	Mitali Mukerji	Delhi	Human genomics
2011	K. Narayanaswamy Balaji	Karnataka	Mycology
2012	Sandip Basu	Maharashtra	Nuclear medicine
2013	Pushkar Sharma	Uttar Pradesh	Immunology
2014	Anurag Agrawal	Delhi	Lung diseases
2015	Vidita Ashok Vaidya	Maharashtra	Neurosciences
2016	Niyaz Ahmed	Telangana	Molecular epidemiology
2017	Amit Dutt	Maharashtra	Genomics
2017	Deepak Gaur	Delhi	Vaccine development
2018	Ganesan Venkatasubramanian	Karnataka	Psychiatry
2019	Dhiraj Kumar	Delhi	Immunology, cell biology
2019	Mohammad Javed Ali	Andhra Pradesh	Dacryology
2020	Bushra Ateeq	Uttar Pradesh	Molecular oncology
2020	Ritesh Agarwal	Chandigarh	Allergic bronchopulmonary aspergillosis (ABPA)
2021	Rohit Srivastava	Maharashtra	Fluorescent & nanoengineered biosensors
2021	Jeemon Panniyammakal	Kerala	Chronic disease epidemiology
2022	Dipyaman Ganguly	West Bengal	Immunology
2024	Jitendra Kumar Sahu	Odisha	Medical Science
2024	Pragya D. Yadav	Uttar Pradesh	Medical Science

=== Physical sciences ===
Vikram Sarabhai	Jayant Narlikar	Ajoy Ghatak	T. V. Ramakrishnan	Thanu Padmanabhan	Rajiah Simon
Ashoke Sen	Ajay K. Sood	Rajesh Gopakumar	Amitava Raychaudhuri	Shiraz Minwalla	Sunil Mukhi
K. S. Krishnan	Kasturi Lal Chopra	Ganapathy Baskaran	Sriram Ramaswamy	Atish Dabholkar	Vinay Gupta

List of awardees, showing the year, place, and specialization
Year	Recipient	Place	Specialization
1958	Kariamanickam Srinivasa Krishnan	Tamil Nadu	Raman scattering
1960	M. G. K. Menon	Kerala	Particle physics
1961	Gopalasamudram Narayana Ramachandran	Tamil Nadu	Ramachandran plot
1962	Vikram Ambalal Sarabhai	Gujarat	Space science
1963	Raja Ramanna	Karnataka	Nuclear physics
1964	Ajit Ram Verma	Uttar Pradesh	Crystallography
1965	Barry Ramachandra Rao	Andhra Pradesh	Crystallography
1966	Sivaraj Ramaseshan	Tamil Nadu	Crystallography
1966	S. C. Jain	Uttar Pradesh	Semiconductor devices
1967	Devendra Lal	Uttar Pradesh	Geophysics
1968	Ashesh Prasad Mitra	West Bengal	Environmental physics
1969	Asoke Nath Mitra	Erstwhile Bengal province (modern day Bangladesh)	Particle physics
1970	Vainu Bappu	Andhra Pradesh	Astrophysics
1971	Padmanabha Krishnagopala Iyengar	Kerala	Nuclear physics
1972	Sivaramakrishna Chandrasekhar	West Bengal	Crystallography
1972	Shri Krishna Joshi	Uttarakhand	Nanotechnology
1973	Virendra Singh	Uttar Pradesh	High energy physics
1974	Krityunjai Prasad Sinha	Bihar	Solid state gravitation
1974	Mahendra Singh Sodha	Uttar Pradesh	Plasma physics
1975	Biswa Ranjan Nag	West Bengal	Semiconductor physics
1975	Kasturi Lal Chopra	Punjab	Material physics
1976	Chanchal Kumar Majumdar	West Bengal	Condensed matter physics
1976	Ramanuja Vijayaraghavan	Tamil Nadu	Condensed matter physics
1978	Jayant Vishnu Narlikar	Maharashtra	Steady state cosmology
1978	E. S. Raja Gopal	Tamil Nadu	Condensed matter physics
1979	Sudhanshu Shekhar Jha	Bihar	Condensed matter physics
1979	Ajoy Kumar Ghatak	Uttar Pradesh	Optical physics
1980	N. S. Satya Murthy	Tamil Nadu	Molecular reaction dynamics
1980	Narasimhaiengar Mukunda	Karnataka	Quantum mechanics
1981	Ramanujan Srinivasan	Tamil Nadu	Magnetic resonance phenomena
1981	Shasanka Mohan Roy	Delhi	High energy physics
1982	Tiruppattur Venkatachalamurti Ramakrishnan	Karnataka	Condensed matter physics
1982	Girish Saran Agarwal	Uttar Pradesh	Quantum optics
1983	Shyam Sunder Kapoor	Maharashtra	Nuclear physics
1983	Ramamurti Rajaraman	Delhi	Theoretical physics
1984	Ranganathan Shashidhar	USA	Liquid crystals
1984	Ramanath Cowsik	Maharashtra	Astroparticle physics
1985	Narendra Kumar	Chhattisgarh	Condensed matter physics
1985	Kehar Singh	Uttar Pradesh	Nanooptics
1986	Predhiman Krishan Kaw	Jammu and Kashmir	Plasma physics
1987	Probir Roy	West Bengal	High energy physics
1987	Vijay Kumar Kapahi	Punjab	Radio astronomy
1988	Deepak Kumar	Delhi	Condensed matter physics
1988	Onkar Nath Srivastava	Uttar Pradesh	Nanotechnology
1989	Muthusamy Lakshmanan	Tamil Nadu	Nonlinear dynamics and chaos theory
1989	N. V. Madhusudana	Karnataka	Liquid crystals
1990	Ajay Kumar Sood	Madhya Pradesh	Nanotechnology
1990	Ganapathy Baskaran	Tamil Nadu	Condensed matter physics
1991	Deepak Dhar	Maharashtra	Statistical physics
1991	Deepak Mathur	Maharashtra	Molecular physics
1992	Vikram Kumar	Delhi	Semiconductor devices
1992	Subodh Raghunath Shenoy	Kerala	Condensed matter physics
1993	Rajiah Simon	Tamil Nadu	Quantum optics
1993	Gopal Krishna	Maharashtra	Radio astronomy
1994	Arup Kumar Raychaudhuri	West Bengal	Solid state physics
1994	Ashoke Sen	West Bengal	Theoretical physics
1995	Mustansir Barma	Maharashtra	Statistical physics
1996	Thanu Padmanabhan	Kerala	Cosmology
1997	Bikas K. Chakrabarti	West Bengal	Quantum annealing
1997	Amitava Raychaudhuri	West Bengal	Particle physics
1998	A. M. Jayannavar	Karnataka	Condensed matter physics
1998	Sumit Ranjan Das	USA	High energy physics
1999	E. V. Sampathkumaran	Tamil Nadu	Superconductivity
1999	Sunil Mukhi	Maharashtra	Theoretical physics
2000	Sriram Ramaswamy	Karnataka	Condensed matter physics
2000	Varun Sahni	Maharashtra	General relativity and gravitation
2001	Rahul Pandit	Karnataka	Condensed matter physics
2002	Mohit Randeria	USA	Condensed matter physics
2002	Avinash Deshpande	Karnataka	Astrophysics
2003	G. Ravindra Kumar	Maharashtra	Plasma physics
2003	Biswarup Mukhopadhyaya	West Bengal	High energy physics
2004	Madan Rao	Karnataka	Statistical mechanics
2005	Sandip Trivedi	Uttar Pradesh	Condensed matter physics
2006	Sanjay Puri	Delhi	Statistical physics
2006	Atish Dabholkar	France (Note: Based in France)	Quantum gravity
2007	Yashwant Gupta	Maharashtra	Radio astronomy
2007	Pinaki Majumdar	West Bengal	Condensed matter physics
2008	Raghunathan Srianand	Maharashtra	Cosmology
2008	Srikanth Sastry	Karnataka	Theoretical physics
2009	Rajesh Gopakumar	West Bengal	String theory
2009	Abhishek Dhar	West Bengal	Condensed matter physics
2010	Umesh Waghmare	Karnataka	Condensed matter physics
2010	Kalobaran Maiti	West Bengal	Condensed matter physics
2011	Shiraz Minwalla	Maharashtra	String theory
2012	Arindam Ghosh	West Bengal	Semiconductors
2012	Krishnendu Sengupta	West Bengal	Theoretical physics
2013	Amol Dighe	Maharashtra	High energy physics
2013	Vijay Balakrishna Shenoy	Karnataka	Condensed matter physics
2014	Pratap Raychaudhuri	West Bengal	Superconductivity
2014	Sadiqali Abbas Rangwala	Maharashtra	Optical physics
2015	Bedangadas Mohanty	Odisha	High energy physics
2015	Mandar Madhukar Deshmukh	Maharashtra	Mesoscopic physics
2016	S. Anantha Ramakrishna	Odisha	Condensed matter physics
2016	Sudhir Kumar Vempati	Karnataka	High-energy physics
2017	Nissim Kanekar	Maharashtra	Astronomy
2017	Vinay Gupta	Rajasthan	Materials science
2018	Aditi De	West Bengal	Quantum information & computing
2018	Ambarish Ghosh	West Bengal	Nano-science
2019	Aninda Sinha	West Bengal	Theoretical physics
2019	Shankar Ghosh	West Bengal	Experimental condensed matter physics
2020	Surajit Dhara	West Bengal	Soft matter physics, optics
2020	Rajesh Ganapathy	Karnataka	Soft condensed matter physics
2021	Kanak Saha	West Bengal	Galaxies: their structure, formation and evolution
2022	Anindya Das	West Bengal	
2022	Basudeb Dasgupta	West Bengal	
2024	Urbasi Sinha	West Bengal	Physics

== See also ==
- Shanti Swarup Bhatnagar Prize
- Council of Scientific and Industrial Research
