= Vikram Kumar (disambiguation) =

Vikram Kumar is an Indian film director and screenwriter.

Vikram Kumar may also refer to:

- Vikram Kumar (physicist), Indian material physicist
- Vikram Kumar (cricketer) (born 1981), English cricketer
- Vikram Sheel Kumar (born 1976), American engineer, doctor, and entrepreneur
