= Mihir Baran Banerjee =

Indian mathematician

- Born: 29 March 1943 (age 83)
- Awards: Shanti Swarup Bhatnagar Prize for Science and Technology
- Scientific career
- Fields: Hydrodynamics and hydromagnetic stability
- Workplaces: Himachal Pradesh University, Shimla

Mihir Baran Banerjee (M.B. Banerjee) (born 29 March 1943) is an Indian mathematician who specialised in hydrodynamics and hydromagnetic stability

He was awarded in 1988 the Shanti Swarup Bhatnagar Prize for Science and Technology, the highest science award in India, in the mathematical sciences category.
