= Jagannath Ganguly =

Indian biochemist

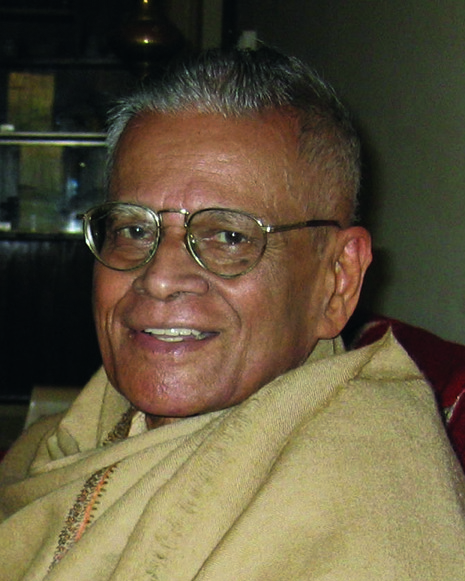
Jagannath Ganguly
- Born: 1 April 1921; Pabna District, Bengal Presidency, British India (now Bangladesh)
- Died: 12 December 2007 (aged 86); Bangalore, Karnataka, India
- Education: Dacca University - MSc, Reading University, UK - PhD, USCLA, USA - Post Doctoral Research
- Known for: Metabolism of Vitamin A Biosynthesis of fatty acids
- Awards: 1963 Shanti Swarup Bhatnagar Prize
- Scientific career
- Fields: Biochemistry

Jagannath Ganguly (1921–2007) was an Indian biochemist known for his researches on Vitamin A and fatty acids, which assisted in the better understanding of their metabolism in humans. Born on the 1 April 1921, he authored a book, Biochemistry of Vitamin A, which details the physiological, biochemical and nutritional characteristics of the organic compound. The Council of Scientific and Industrial Research, the apex agency of the Government of India for scientific research, awarded him the Shanti Swarup Bhatnagar Prize for Science and Technology, one of the highest Indian science awards, in 1963, for his contributions to biological sciences. He died on 12 December 2007.

== Shanti Swarup Bhatnagar Prize for Science and Technology ==
- Prof Jagannath Ganguly was awarded the prestigious Shanti Swarup Bhatnagar Prize for Science and Technology for the year 1963.
- The award Citation reads: Dr Ganguly is internationally known for his work on the metabolism of vitamin A, biosynthesis of fatty acids and intestinal absorption of lipids.
- Details: http://ssbprize.gov.in/Content/Detail.aspx?AID=457

== Indian National Science Academy ==
=== Deceased Fellow ===
- http://insaindia.res.in/detail/N68-0252

=== Biographical Memoirs ===
- https://insaindia.res.in/BM/BM33_0812.pdf

== Bibliography ==
=== Books: Extract from Indian National Science Academy "Biographical Memoirs" ===
- 1972 - Edited the book: "Current Trends in the Biochemistry of Lipids", Academic Press, London.
- 1989 - Authored the book: “Biochemistry of vitamin A”, J. Ganguly, C. R. C. Press Inc., Boca Raton, FL., U.S.A.

=== Publications and Reviews: Extract from Indian National Science Academy "Biographical Memoirs" ===
- 1947

Heat treatment and the biological value of soybean protein: S. S. De and J. Ganguly, Nature, 159, 341.

The intestine as a possible seat of conversion of carotene to vitamin A in the rat and the pig: S. Y. Thompson, J. Ganguly and S. K. Kon, Brit. J. Nutrit., 1, v.

The form of vitamin A in cow's milk: J. Ganguly, S. K. Kon and S. Y. Thompson, Brit. J. Nutrit., 1, III.

- 1949

The intestinal conversion of carotene to vitamin A: S. Y. Thompson, R. Braude, A. T. Cowic, J. Ganguly and S. K. Kon, Biochem. J. 44, ix.

The conversion of β-carotene to vitamin A in the intestine: S. Y. Thompson, J. Ganguly and S. K. Kon, Brit. J. Nutrit., 3, 58–78.

- 1950

Further studies on the conversion of β-carotene to vitamin A in the intestine: S. Y. Thompson, R. Braude, M. E. Coats, A. T. Cowie, J. Ganguly and S. K. Kon (1950), Brit. J. Nutrit., 4, 398–421.

- 1951

Stereoisomerization of the polycis compounds, pro-γ-carotene and prolycopene in chickens and hens: H. J. Deuel Jr., J. Ganguly, B. K. Koe and L. Zechmeister, Arch. Biochem. Biophys., 33, 143–149.

- 1952

Stereochemical configuration and provitamin A activity: X. A comparison of synthetic 15, 15'-monocis-β-carotene (central monocis-β-carotene) with all-trans-β-carotene in the rat and chick: L. Zechmeister, H. J. Deuel Jr., H. H. Inhoffen, J. Leemann, S. M. Greenberg and J. Ganguly, Arch. Biochem. Biophys., 36, 80–88.

Stereochemical configuration and provitamin A activity: XI. A comparison of synthetic all-trans and dicis-16, 16’-homo-β–carotene C42H58 with all-trans-β–carotene in the rat: H. J. Deuel Jr., H. H. Inhoffen, J. Ganguly, L. Wallcave and L. Zechmeister, Arch. Biochem. Biophys., 40, 352–357.

Studies on the distribution of vitamin A as ester and alcohol and of carotenoids in the plasma proteins of several species: J. Ganguly, N. I. Krinsky, J. W. Mehl and K. J. Deuel Jr., Arch. Biochem, Biophys., 38, 275–282.

- 1953

Intracellular distribution of vitamin a asterase activity in the rat liver: J. Ganguly and H. J. Deuel Jr., Nature, 172, 120.

Absence of relationship between vitamin A alcohol levels in plasma and in liver of rats: J. Ganguly and N. I. Krinsky, Biochem. J. 54, 177–187.

Studies on vitamin A esterase. III. The intracellular distribution of vitamin A esterase and cholesterol esterase in chicken liver: S. Krishnamurthy, P. Seshadri Sastry and J. Ganguly, Arch. Biochem. Biophys., 75, 6–14.

Provitamin A activity of a structural isomer of cryptozanthin and its methyl ether: H. J. Deuel Jr., J. Ganguly, L. Wallcave and L. Zechmeister, Arch. Biochem. Biophys., 47, 237–240.

Studies on carotenoid metabolism: XII. The effect of dietary carotenoids on the carotenoid distribution in the tissues of chickens: J. Ganguly, J. W. Mehl and H. J. Deuel Jr., J. Nutrit., 50, 73–83.

Studies on carotenoid metabolism: XIII. The carotenoid composition of the blood, liver and ovaries of the rat, ewe, cow and frog: J. Ganguly, J. N. Mehl and H. J. Deuel Jr., J. Nutrit., 50, 73–83.

Studies on carotenoid metabolism. XIV. The biological activity of Echinenone: J. Ganguly, N. I. Krinsky, J. H. Pinckard and H. J. Deuel. Jr., Hoppe-Seyler's Z. Physiol. Chem., 295, 61–66.

Intracellular distribution of vitamin A ester and vitamin A alcohol in rat liver: N. I. Krinsky and J. Ganguly, J. Biol. Chem. 202, 227–232.

- 1954

Intracellular distribution of vitamin A esterase activity in rat liver: J. Ganguly, Arch. Biochem. Biophys., 52., 186–189.

- 1955

The site of conversion of provitamin A to vitamin A: J. Ganguly (1955), Silver Jubilee Souvenir, Society of Biological Chemists, India, pp. 195–198

- 1956

Isolation and nature of Echinenone, a provitamin A: J. Ganguly, N. I. Krinsky and J. H. Pinckard, Arch. Biochem. Biophys., 60, 354–351.

Effect of blocking the reticulo-endothelial system on the storage of vitamin A ester and alcohol in the liver of the rat: S. Krishnamurthy and J. Ganguly, Nature, 177, 575–576.

- 1957

Studies on vitamin A esterase: I. The general properties and possible specificity of the rat-liver enzyme: P. Seshadri Sastry, S. Krishnamurthy and J. Ganguly, Indian J. Med. Res. 45., 263–272.

Studies on vitamin A esterase: II. The hydrolysis of natural vitamin A esters within the living animal: S. Krishnamurthy, P. Seshadri Sastry and J. Ganguly, Indian J. Med. Res., 45, 391–394.

- 1958

Association of vitamin A ester and vitamin A alcohol with proteins in rat liver: S. Krishnamurthy, S. Mahadevan and J. Ganguly, J. Biol. Chem., 233, 32–36.

- 1959

Storage of vitamin A ester, vitamin A alcohol and of carotenoids in association with proteins in chicken liver: S. Mahadevan, S. Krishnamurthy and J. Ganguly, Indian J. Med. Res., 47, 199–206.

The transport of carotenoids, vitamin A and cholesterol across the intestine of rats and chickens: J. Ganguly, S. Krishnamurthy and S. Mahadevan, Biochem. J. 71, 756–762.

The mode of absorption of vitamin A across the intestine of rats: S. Mahadevan, S. Krishnamurthy and J. Ganguly, Arch. Biochem. Biophys., 83, 371–375.

On the mechanism of fatty acid synthesis: Salih J. Wakil and J. Ganguly, J. Am. Chem. Soc., 81, 2597. The mechanism of biosynthesis of higher fatty acids: S. J. Wakil and J. Ganguly, Federation Proc., 18, 346.

- 1960

Absorption, transport and storage of vitamin A: J. Ganguly, Vitamins and Hormones, Academic Press, New York, 18, 387–402.

Studies on the mechanism of fatty acid synthesis: VII: Biosynthesis of fatty acids from malonyl-CoA: J. Ganguly, Biochem. Biophys. Acta., 40, 110–118.

- 1961

High cholesterol diet and esterification of cholesterol by the intestinal mucosa of rats: S. K. Murthy, S. Mahadevan and J. Ganguly, Arch. Biochem. Biophys., 95, 176–180.

Fatty acid specificity for the etherification of vitamin A and cholesterol by intestinal and pancreatic enzymes in rats: S. K. Murthy, S. Mahadevan, P. Seshadri Sastry and J. Ganguly, Nature, 189, 482–484.

Studies on vitamin A esterase: IV. The hydrolysis and synthesis of vitamin A esters by rat intestinal mucosae: S. Mahadevan, S. K. Murthy, S. Krishnamurthy and J. Ganguly, Biochem. J., 79, 416–424.

Studies on vitamin A esterase: V. A comparative study of vitamin A esterase and cholesterol esterase of rat and chicken liver: P. Seshadri Sastry and J. Ganguly, Biochem. J., 80, 397–406.

Further studies on the absorption of vitamin A: S. Mahadevan and J. Ganguly, Biochem. J., 81, 53–58.

Fatty acid components of vitamin A ester of sheep liver: K. Subba Rao, P. Seshadri Sastry and J. Ganguly, Arch. Biochem. Biophys., 95, 285–289.

Amino acid patterns in vitamin A deficient rates: P. Malathi, P. Seshadri Sastry and J. Ganguly, Nature, 189, 660–661.

- 1962

Vitamin C status of vitamin A-deficient rats: P. Seshadri Sastry P. Malathi, K. Subba Rao and J. Ganguly, Nature, 193, 1080–1081.

Enzymic oxidation of vitamin A aldehyde to vitamin A acid by rat liver: S. Mahadevan, S. K. Murthy and J. Ganguly, Biochem. J., 85, 326–331. Studies on cholesterol esterases of the small intestine and pancreas of rats: S. K. Murthy and J. Ganguly, Biochem. J., 83, 460–469. 1963 Some observations on the mechanism of absorption of cholesterol in rats: S. K. Murthy, J. S. K. David and J. Ganguly, Biochem. Biophys. Acta., 70, 490–492.

Biosynthesis of fatty acids: J. Ganguly, Advances in Biochemistry (Publishers: Indian Institute of Science) p. 92-105.

Studies on metabolism of vitamin A: 1. The biological activity of vitamin A acid in rats: P. Malathi, P. Seshadri Sastry K. Subba Rao and J. Ganguly, Biochem. J., 87, 305–311.

Studies on metabolism of vitamin A: 2. Enzymic synthesis and hydrolysis of phenolic sulphates in vitamin A deficient rats: K. Subba Rao, P. Seshadri Sastry and J. Ganguly, Biochem. J., 87, 313–317.

Studies on metabolism of vitamin A: 3. The mode of absorption of vitamin A esters in living rats: S. Mahadevan, P. Seshadri Sastry and J. Ganguly, Biochem. J., 88, 531–534.

Studies on metabolism of vitamin A: 4. The mode of absorption of vitamin A by rat intestine in vitro: S. Mahadevan, P. Seshadri Sastry and J. Ganguly, Biochem. J., 88, 534–539.

- 1964

Mechanism of absorption of cholesterol and vitamin A in rats: J. Ganguly and S. K. Murthy, LIPID TRANSPORT: (Publishers: Charles Thomas, Springfield, Ill., U.S.A), proceedings of the ‘International Symposium on Lipid Transport, Vanderbilt University, Nashville (Tenn.), U.S.A.: 22–32.

The effect of dietary protein contents on the intestinal conversion of B carotene to vitamin A in rats: D. S. Deshmukh and J. Ganguly, Indian J. Biochem., 1, 204–207.

Studies on metabolism of vitamin A: 5. Dietary protein content and metabolism of vitamin A: D. S. Deshmukh, P. Malathi and J. Ganguly, Biochem. J., 90, 98–104.

Studies on metabolism of vitamin A: 6. The effect of vitamin A deficiency on the activation of sulphate and its transfer to p-nitrophenol in rat liver: K. Subba Rao and J. Ganguly, Biochem. J., 90, 104–109.

Studies on metabolism of vitamin A: 7. Lowered synthesis of ascorbic acid in vitamin A deficient rats: P. Malathi and J. Ganguly, Biochem. J., 92, 521–527.

Studies on metabolism of vitamin A: 8. Effect of ascorbate on isoprenoid metabolism in vitamin A-deficient rats: P. Malathi and J. Ganguly, Biochem. J., 92, 527–531.

Effect of vitamin A deficiency on the concentrations of sodium and potassium in the blood plasma of rats: H. S. Juneja, S. K. Murthy and J. Ganguly, Biochem. J., 93, 499–503.

The fate of intracardially administered retinyl esters in the rat: S. Mahadevan, D. S. Deshmukh and J. Ganguly, Biochem. J., 93, 499–503

Effect of retinoic acid on the reproductive performances of male and female rats: H. S. Juneja, S. K. Murthy and J. Ganguly, Indian J. Exp. Biol., 2, 153–154.

Absorption of retinoic acid (vitamin A acid) in rats: D. S. Deshmukh, P. Malathi, K. Subba Rao and J. Ganguly, Indian J. Biochem., 1, 164–166.

- 1965

Studies on metabolism of vitamin A: Absorption of retinal (vitamin A aldehyde) in rats: D. S. Deshmukh, S. K. Murthy, S. Mahadevan and J. Ganguly, Biochem. J., 96, 377–382.

Rapid conversion of retinal (vitamin A aldehyde) to retinoic acid (vitamin A acid) in the living rat: D. S. Deshmukh, P. Malathi and J. Ganguly, Biochem. Biophys. Acta., 187, 120–122.

Influence of dietary proteins on absorption and metabolism of vitamin A: S. Mahadevan, P. Malathi and J. Ganguly, World Rev. Nutr. Diet. (S. Karger, Basle, Switzerland), 5, 209–236.

Uptake, during absorption, of free fatty acids by the phospholipids of the intestinal mucosa of rats: S. S. Raghavan, H. S. Juneja, S. K. Murthy and J. Ganguly, Nature, 206, 189–191.

- 1966

Role of the intestinal brush border in the absorption of cholesterol in rats: J. S. K. David, P. Malathi and J. Ganguly, Biochem. J., 98, 662–668.

Studies on metabolism of vitamin A: The effect of the stage of vitamin A deficiency of sulphate activation in rat liver: K. Subba Rao and J. Ganguly, Biochem. J., 96, 693–695.

The effect of vitamin A deficiency on the biosynthesis of steroid hormones in rats: H. S. Juneja, S. K. Murthy and J. Ganguly, Biochem. J., 99, 138–145.

- 1967

Studies on the intestinal absorption of triglycerides and fatty acids in rats: S. S. Raghavan and J. Ganguly, Indian J. Biochem., 4, 68–74.

Further studies on the mechanism of absorption of vitamin A and cholesterol: J. S. K. David and J. Ganguly, Indian J. Biochem., 4, 14–17.

Demonstration of oxidation and reduction of retinal in rat intestine: D. S. Deshmukh and J. Ganguly, Indian J. Biochem., 4, 18–21

Pathways of absorption of retinal and retinoic acid in the rat: Noel H. Fidge, T. Shiratori, J. Ganguly and D. S. Goodman, J. Lipid Res., 2, 103–109.

Biogenesis of carotenes and vitamin A: J. Ganguly and S. K. Murthy, THE VITAMINS: Chemistry and Physiology, Vol. 1 Second Edition, Editors W. H. Sebrell and R. S. Harris (Academic Press Inc., New York), pp. 125–153.

Metabolism of vitamin A: J. Ganguly, J. Scient. Ind. Res., 26, 110–130.

- 1968

Further studies on the intestinal absorption of triglycerides and fatty acids in rats: P. V. Subbaiah, S. S. Raghavan and J. Ganguly, Indian J. Biochem, 5, 147–152.

- 1969

Studies on the positional integrity of glyceride fatty acids during digestion and absorption in rats: S. S. Raghavan and J. Ganguly, Biochem. J., 113, 81–87.

Acylation of lysolecithin to lecithin by a brush border-free particulate preparation from rate intestinal mucosa: P. V. Subbaiah, P. S. Sastry and J. Ganguly, Biochem. J., 113, 441–442.

Studies on the phospholipases of rat intestinal mucosa: P. V. Subbaiah, P. S. Sastry and J. Ganguly, Biochem. J., 113, 441–442.

Absorption of vitamin A: Jagannath Ganguly, Am. J. Clin. Nutrit, 22, 923–933.

International Symposium on the Metabolic Functions of vitamin A: J. Ganguly, J. Scient. Ind. Res. 28 (5), 154–156

Studies on metabolism of vitamin A: The effect of hormones on gestation in retinoate-fed female rats: H. S. Juneja, N. R. Moudgal and J. Ganguly, Biochem J., 111, 97–106.

- 1970

Acylation of lysolecithin in the intestinal mucosa of rats: P. V. Subbaiah and J. Ganguly, Biochem. J., 118, 241–246.

Transesterification of lysolecithin in the intestinal mucosa of rats: P. V. Subbaiah and J. Ganguly, Indian J. Biochem. Biophys., 6, 197–203.

Entry of unhydrolysed retinyl acetate into the cells of everted intestinal sacs of rats at low temperature: S. N. Mathur, J. S. K. David, S. K. Murthy and J. Ganguly, Indian J. Biochem., 7, 104–107.

On the possible systemic mode of action of vitamin A: J. Ganguly, K. Sarada, R. C. Das., P. S. Joshi, M. Jayaram, S. K. Murthy and K. Bhargava (1970), Proceedings of the international Symposium on ‘Vitamin and Carrier Functions of Polyprenoids’, Bangalore, Dec., 1976, World Rev. Nutr. Diet. (Karger, Basel) Vol. 31, pp. 59–64.

Absorption and transport of vitamin A: J. Ganguly and S. K. Murthy, Proceedings of the Golden Jubilee Celebrations of the Nutrition Research Laboratories, Hyderabad (India), J. Scient. Ind. Res., 29, 58–62

- 1971

The effect of vitamin A status on the level of some steroids in the ovarian vein blood of pregnant rats: J. Ganguly, G. S. Pope, S. Y. Thompson, Joyce Toothill, J. Edwards-Webb and H. B. Waynforth, Biochem. J., 121, 22 p.

Studies on metabolism of vitamin A: The effect of vitamin A status on the secretion rates of some steroids into the ovarian venous blood of pregnant rats: J. Ganguly, G. S. Pope, S. Y. Thompson and Joyce Toothill, Biochem. J., 122, 235–239.

Studies on the metabolism of vitamin A: The effect of vitamin A status on the content of some steroids in the ovaries of pregnant rats: J. Ganguly, G. S. Pope, S. Y. Thompson, Joyce Toothill, J. Edwards Webb and H. B. Waynforth, Biochem. J., 123, 669.

Absorption and metabolism of retinoic acid: J. Ganguly, Proceedings of the First Asian Nutrition Congress at Hyderabad from 28 January to 2 February 1971.

- 1972

Intestinal absorption of lipids: J. Ganguly, P. V. Subbaiah and S. Parthasarthy, in "Current Trends in the Biochemistry of Lipids”, Proceedings of the "International Symposium on Lipids" held at Bangalore, 3–4 December 1971, Edited by : J. Ganguly and R. M. S. Smellie, Academic Press, London, pp. 67–81.

Studies on the intracellular distribution of retinyl acetate hydrolase in rat and chicken intestine: S. N. Mathur, S. K. Murthy and J. Ganguly, Internet J. Vit. Nutr. Res., 42. 115–126.

- 1973

Vitamin A economy of the developing chick embryo and of the freshly hatched chick: P. S. Joshi, S. N. Mathur, S. K. Murthy and J. Ganguly, Biochem. J., 136, 757–761.

A simple biosynthetic method for the preparation of 14C-glycerol-labeled phosphatidyl choline: S. Parthasarathy and J. Ganguly, Biochem. Biophys. Acta., 296, 62–64.

Effect of vitamin A deprivation on the cholesterol side chain cleavage enzyme activity of testes and ovaries of rats: M. Jayaram, S. K. Murthy and J. Ganguly, Biochem. J., 136, 221–223.

- 1974

Recent advances in the physiology of vitamin A: J. Ganguly, Medikon International, 67, 23–26.

On the mechanism of intestinal absorption of phosphatidyl-choline in rats: S. Parthasarathy, P. V. Subbaiah and J. Ganguly, Biochem. J., 140, 503–508.

Studies on the separation of retinyl ester hydrolase(s) and lipase of chicken pancreas: S. N. Mathur, P. S. Joshi, S. K. Murthy and J. Ganguly, Ind. Journal of Biochem. Biophys., 11, 105–107.

- 1975

Effect of depletion of vitamin A, followed by supplementation with retinyl acetate or retinoic acid on regeneration of rat liver: M. Jayaram, K. Sarada and J. Ganguly, Biochem. J., 146, 501–504.

Effect of vitamin A - nutritional status on the growth of estrogen–primed chick oviduct: P. S. Joshi, S. K. Murthy and J. Ganguly, Biochem. J., 154, 249–251.

On the possible systemic mode of action of vitamin A: J. Ganguly and Jayaram, Proceedings of the Symposium on Growth and Differentiated Function in Eukaryotic Cells. Editor: S. Talwar, Raven Press, New York, pp. 287–293.

- 1976

Recent advances in the Physiology of vitamin A: Bires Chandra Guha Memorial Lecture, 1975, J. Ganguly, Proceedings of the Indian National Science Academy Vol. 41, Part B, No.5, pp. 421–426.

Studies on the biopotencies and intestinal absorption of different apo-β-carotenoids in rats and chickens: R. V. Sharma, S. N. Mathur and J. Ganguly, Biochem. J. 158, 377–383.

Effect of unsaturated lipids on the bile flow and biliary excretion of cholesterol and bile salts in rats: Ranajit Paul and J. Ganguly, Chemistry and Physics of Lipids, 17, 315–323.

- 1977

Studies on the metabolism of β–carotene and apo-β-carotenoids in rats and chickens: R. V. Sharma, S. N. Mathur, A. A. Dmitrovsky, R. C. Das and J. Ganguly, Biochem. Biophys. Acta., 486, 183–194.

Effect of vitamin A - nutritional status on the RNA of the liver, intentional mucosa and testes of rats: M. Jayaram and J. Ganguly, Biochem. J., 166, 339–366.

- 1978

The effect of dietary lipids on the secretion of biliary lipids in rats: Ranajit Paul, C. S. Ramesha, S. Parthasarathy and J. Ganguly, Ind. J. Biochem. Biophys., 15, 401–406.

Vaginal smear patterns and blood progesterone levels in the retinoic acid supplemented rats: K. Sarada, J. Ganguly and H. Lipner, Ind. J. Exp. Bio., 15, 1139–1141.

Isolation of a receptor protein for retinal from the oviduct magnum of laying hens: R. C. Das, K. Sarada, S. K. Murthy and J. Ganguly, Ind. J. Biochem. Biophys., 15, 251–254.

Some recant observations of the systemic mode of action of vitamin A: J. Ganguly, K. Sarada, S. K. Murthy and T. C. Anand Kumar, Current Science, 47, 292–295.

- 1979

Mechanism of cholesterol-lowering effects of polyunsaturated lipids: J. Ganguly, Ranajit Paul, C. S. Ramesha and P. Balaram, “Biochemical Aspects of Nutrition". Proceedings of the Symposium held at the 1st Congress of the Federation of Asian and Occasion Biochemists at Nagoya (Japan), Oct. 10.12., 1977 (Editor Prof. K. Yagi), pp. 105 –114.

Effect of deprivation of vitamin A on the ultrastructural changes during estrogen induced growth of immature chick oviduct: R. C. Das, K. Sarada, S. K. Murthy and J. Ganguly, Ind. J. Expl. Biol., 17, 336–349.

Isolation and characterization of binding proteins for retinol from the cytosol, nucleosol and chromatin of the oviduct magnum of laying hens: M. R. S. Rao, V. R. Prasad, G. Padmanabhan and J. Ganguly, Biochem. J., 183, 501–506.

- 1980

Effect of dietary unsaturated oils on the biosynthesis of cholesterol and on biliary and faecal excretion of cholesterol and bile acids in rats: C. S. Ramesha, Ranajit Paul and J. Ganguly, J. Nutrit., 110, 2149–2158.

On the mechanism of hypocholesterolemic effects of polyunsaturated lipids: Ranajit Paul, C. S. Ramesha and J. Ganguly, Advances in Lipid Research (Academic Press, New York) 17, 155–171.

Systemic mode of action of vitamin A: J. Ganguly, M. R. S. Rao, S. K. Murthy and K. Sarada (1980), Vitamins and Hormones (Academic Press, New York) 38, 1-54.

Isolation of binding proteins of retinol from the cytosol, nucleosol and chromatin of rat testes: Rana Shinde, R. C. Das, K. Sarada and J. Ganguly, Ind. J. Biochem. Biophys., 17, 135–138.

Effect of deprivation of vitamin A on the basic proteins of the nuclei of rat testes: M. R. S. Rao, Jagmohan Singh and J. Ganguly, Biochem. Biophys. Res. Commun., 94, 1–8.

- 1982

Localization of testis-variant histones in rat testis chromatin: M. R. S. Rao, J. B. Rao and J. Ganguly, Biochem. J., 205, 15–21.

- 1983

Histological effects of vitamin A deprivation on the estrogen-induced development of check oviduct: J. Ganguly, P. S. Joshi, S. K. Murthy, E. Unni, David G. F. X. and T. C. Anand Kumar, Indian J. Exptl. Biol., 21, 69–72.

Histological and ultrastructural studies on the effect of vitamin A depletion and subsequent repletion with vitamin A on the germ cells and Sertoli cells in rat testes: E. Unni, M. R. S. Rao and J. Ganguly, Indian J. Exptl. Biol., 21, 180–192.

Purification of a retinol binding protein from the hen-oviduct cytosol and its immunological cross reactivity with those from the nucleus: V. R. Prasad, M. R. S. Rao and J. Ganguly, Biochem. Biophys. Acta., 748, 271–277.

- 1985

Mechanism of conversion of carotene to vitamin A: Central cleavage versus random cleavage: J. Ganguly and P. S. Sastry, World Review of Nutrition and Dietics, 45, 198.

== See also ==
- Metabolism of Vitamin A
