= Pratap Raychaudhuri =

Indian physicist (born 1971)

Pratap Raychaudhuri (born 13 December 1971) is an Indian physicist who works at Tata Institute of Fundamental Research, Bombay. His specialization is in the fields of superconductivity and magnetism, transport based spectroscopy, and thin films. He was awarded the Shanti Swarup Bhatnagar Prize in 2014.
