= Padam Chand Jain =

Indian mathematician (born 1930)

- Born: 30 September 1930 (age 95)
- Awards: Shanti Swarup Bhatnagar Prize for Science and Technology
- Scientific career
- Fields: Partial differential equations, Mathematics

Padam Chand Jain (P.C. Jain) (born 30 September 1930) is an Indian mathematician who specialised in numerical solutions of partial differential equations.

He was awarded in 1975 the Shanti Swarup Bhatnagar Prize for Science and Technology, the highest science award in India, in the mathematical sciences category. Jain has done important work on the development of algorithms for solving non-linear problems involving irregular boundaries. Algorithms based on finite difference technique, finite element technique and quasilinearization and invariant embedding have been developed and applied to various problems in fluid dynamics. These techniques have added to the existing knowledge on fluid dynamics and its applications and hold promise of enabling applied mathematicians and scientists to solve still more difficult non-linear problems. His work is likely to be of value in finding solutions for problems of stability and turbulence in fluid dynamics, numerical weather forecasting and magnetohydrodynamic power generation.
