= E. M. V. Krishnamurthy =

Indian computer scientist (1934–2012)

- Born: Edayyathu Mangalam Venkatarama Krishnamurthy; 18 June 1934; Ariyalur, Tamil Nadu, India
- Died: 26 October 2012 (aged 78); Canberra, Australia
- Occupation: computer scientist
- Known for: Fast Division Algorithm; Theoretical computer science
- Scientific career
- Fields: Computer Science

Edayyathu Mangalam Venkatarama Krishnamurthy (18 June 1934 – 26 October 2012) was an Indian-born computer scientist. He was a professor at the Department of Computer science, Indian Institute of Science, Bangalore. He was an Emeritus Fellow, Computer Sciences Laboratory, Research School of Information Sciences and Engineering, Australian National University, Canberra.

He received the prestigious Shanti Swarup Bhatnagar Prize for Science and Technology (1978). He held several positions working for many institutions in India, Australia, USA, Europe and other nations.
