= Maithili Sharan =

Indian mathematician (born 1953)

- Born: 4 January 1953 (age 73)
- Education: Rajasthan University, IIT Delhi
- Awards: Shanti Swarup Bhatnagar Prize for Science and Technology
- Scientific career
- Fields: Mathematical modelling, Biofluid Mechanics
- Workplaces: Indian Institute of Technology Delhi

Maithili Sharan (born 4 January 1953) is an Indian mathematician who specialises in mathematical modelling, biofluid mechanics, Air Pollution and atmospheric boundary layer.

He was awarded in 1992 the Shanti Swarup Bhatnagar Prize for Science and Technology, the highest science award in India, in the mathematical sciences category. Maithili Sharan's notable findings relate to development of mathematical models for the transport of gases in pulmonary and systemic circulations including brain and dispersion of air pollutants in low wind conditions, numerical simulation of Bhopal gas leak, and weak wind nocturnal boundary layer.
