= Sadiqali Abbas Rangwala =

Indian physicist

Sadiqali Abbas Rangwala (born 10 July 1971) is an Indian physicist. He is working in the field of Experimental atomic, molecular and optical physics. He was awarded the Shanti Swarup Bhatnagar Prize in 2014. He has made outstanding contribution on collisionally cooled ions with trapped atoms leading to new ultracold ion-atom physics.
