= Kavirayani Ramakrishna Prasad =

Indian chemist

Kavirayani Ramakrishna Prasad (born 7 January 1969) is an Indian chemist. He is working in synthesis in organic chemistry. He is working in Indian Institute of Science. He received Shanti Swarup Bhatnagar awards in 2014.
