= Karmeshu =

Indian mathematician (born 1949)

- Born: May 30, 1949 (age 77)
- Education: University of Delhi
- Known for: Mathematical Modelling and Computer Simulation
- Awards: Shanti Swarup Bhatnagar Prize for Science and Technology, C. M. Jacob Medal
- Scientific career
- Fields: Mathematical modelling, Computer Simulation
- Workplaces: Jawaharlal Nehru University, New Delhi

Karmeshu (born May 30, 1949) is an Indian mathematician who specialises in mathematical modelling and Computer Simulation.

In 1993, Karmeshu was awarded the Shanti Swarup Bhatnagar Prize for Science and Technology, the highest science award in India, in the mathematical sciences category. Prof. Karmeshu has developed mathematical models for the dynamics of social and technical systems with special emphasis on their stochastic evolution. He has made contributions towards the understanding of the unity of structure and dynamics of diverse apparently unconnected systems. His research articles have been published not only in Science Citation Index journals but also in Social Sciences Citation Index journals. He is a recipient of SSI Lifetime Achievement Award of Systems Society of India.
