= Shankar Doraiswamy =

Indian oceanographer (born 1967)

- Born: 9 August 1967 (age 59); Bangalore, Karnataka, India
- Education: IIT Madras, IISc
- Known for: Tropical ocean dynamics Ocean-atmosphere interaction in the monsoon region Monsoons; Hydrology
- Awards: Shanti Swarup Bhatnagar Award (2011); CSIR Young Scientist Award(2002)
- Scientific career
- Fields: Oceanography
- Workplaces: National Institute of Oceanography, Goa

Shankar Doraiswamy is an Indian oceanographer. Senior Principal Scientist position at the National Institute of Oceanography in Goa. He was awarded in 2011 the Shanti Swarup Bhatnagar Prize for Science and Technology, the highest science award in India, in the Earth sciences category.

== Biography ==
He was born in Bangalore on 9 August 1967. He studied at the Indian Institute of Technology, Madras and the Indian Institute of Science, Bangalore. He holds a PhD in marine science from the University of Goa. IIT Madras conferred its highest honor for an alumnus to Dr Shankar Doraiswamy in 2022 by recognising him as a Distinguished Alumnus Awardee.
