= K. Sandeep =

Indian mathematician

K Sandeep (born 3 April 1973) is an Indian mathematician specialising in elliptic partial differential equations. He was awarded the Shanti Swarup Bhatnagar Prize for Science and Technology, the highest science award in India, for the year 2015 in mathematical science category. He is affiliated to the TIFR Centre for Applicable Mathematics, Bangalore.
