= Dipti Ranjan Sahoo =

Indian academic

- Education: IIT Kanpur, University of Texas
- Occupation: Professor of civil engineering

Dipti Ranjan Sahoo is an Indian professor in the Department of Civil Engineering at the Indian Institute of Technology, IIT Delhi. He is the recipient of the Shanti Swarup Bhatnagar Prize (2022) in Engineering Sciences.

== Education and career ==
Sahoo completed his bachelor's degree in Civil Engineering from Indira Gandhi Institute of Technology (IGIT) Sarang, Utkal University, Odisha. He received an M. Tech. and Ph. D. in Civil Engineering with Structural Engineering specialization from IIT Kanpur in 2004 and 2008, respectively. He further carried out post-doctoral research in the Department of Civil and Environmental Engineering at the University of Texas at Arlington, USA. In 2010, he joined as Assistant Professor in the Department of Civil Engineering at IIT Delhi. He became a full Professor in 2021. Currently, he is the Dean (Infrastructure) at IIT Delhi.

He is an elected Fellow of Indian National Academic of Engineering (INAE), Institution of Civil Engineers, UK, the Institution of Engineers (India), the Indian Society of Earthquake Technology, and the Institute of Engineers (India). He is on editorial board for the International Journal of Steel Structures, Springer.

Sahoo has contributed to the field of Structural Engineering, Earthquake Engineering, and Structural Fire. His research focuses on seismic design and analysis of concrete, steel and composite structures, and structural fire engineering. development of seismic retrofitting, real-time hybrid simulation techniques, nonlinear finite element modelling, passive vibration control techniques, and other interconnected areas of research. He is credited with developing cost-effective seismic design solutions, passive control devices for seismic-resistant structures, all-steel and self-centering buckling-restrained braces.

He has been part of various investigative panels on structural disasters in India.

== Awards and recognition ==
- Shanti Swarup Bhatnagar Prize in Engineering Sciences (2022) for contribution in Structural/Earthquake Engineering
- Applied Research Award (Prof. P. C. P. Bhatta Faculty Research Award), IIT Delhi (2024)
- Young Engineers Award, Indian National Academy of Engineering, The Institution of Engineers, India
