= S. Venkata Mohan =

Indian engineer (born 1970)

S Venkata Mohan (born 1 July 1970) is an Indian engineer who has specialization in Environmental Engineering, Environmental Biotechnology, Bioenergy, Bioengineering. The Council of Scientific and Industrial Research, the apex agency of the Government of India for scientific research, awarded him the Shanti Swarup Bhatnagar Prize for Science and Technology, one of the highest Indian science awards, in 2014, for his contributions to Engineering Sciences.

== Career ==
Dr S. Venkata Mohan is working as a Scientist at CSIR-Indian Institute of Chemical Technology (CSIR-IICT), Hyderabad since 1998. He holds a B.Tech in Civil Engineering, an M.Tech in Environmental Engineering, and a Ph.D. from Sri Venkateswara University, Tirupati. Dr. Mohan's career includes appointments as a visiting professor at Kyoto University (2005), an Alexander von Humboldt (AvH) Fellow at Technical University of Munich, Germany (2001-02), and a Kyung Hee International Fellow, South Korea (2018). His research endeavors primarily focus on understanding and responding to human-induced environmental changes within the framework of sustainability, particularly in the interface of Environment and Bioengineering. Dr. Mohan's research interests include Acidogenesis, Bioelectrogenesis, Photosynthesis, Fermentation, Circular Bioeconomy, Waste Remediation, Wastewater-based surveillance, and Sustainable Engineering. He is dedicated to designing self-sustainable systems and technologies through a nexus approach, enabling the production of low-carbon energy, chemicals, and materials while adopting regenerative resource management principles. He also works on various industrial, societal and consultancy projects.

Dr. Mohan's scholarly contributions comprises over 450 research articles, 65 book chapters, edited 5 books and have 14 patents. His work has garnered significant recognition, with more than 33,000+ citations and an impressive H-index of 100 (Google Scholar). He has also played a pivotal role in shaping the academic landscape by mentoring 38 Ph.D. students, 2 M.Phils, and over 120 M.Tech/B.Tech/M.Sc students.

== Honors and awards ==
Dr. Mohan was honored with the 'Shanti Swarup Bhatnagar (SSB) Prize' in Engineering Sciences by the Government of India in 2014. He has received the 'INAE-SERB Abdul Kalam Technology Innovation National Fellow', the 'Golden Peacock Eco-Innovation Award', the 'Dr. C.V. Raman Award' by the Government of Andhra Pradesh, 'Tata Innovation Fellow 2018' by Department of Biotechnology, VASVIK Award for the year 2018 in the category of ‘Environmental Science and Technology’ by Vividhlaxi Audyohik Samshodhan Vikas Kendra, ‘Most outstanding Researcher' in the field of Environmental Science in India-2018 by Careers 360, ‘National Bioscience Award-2012’ by Department of Biotechnology (DBT), SERB-IGCW-2017 for ‘Biohydrogen Technology’ from DST-SERB, 'Environmental Engineering Design Award 2017' by the National Design and Research Forum (NDRF) of Institute of Engineers, India (2017), ‘Prosper.net-Scopus Young Researcher Award in Sustainable Development-2010’ under Energy Category by United Nations University and Elsevier, ‘NASI-Scopus Young Scientist Award- 2010’ in Earth, Oceanographic & Environmental Sciences by NASI and Elsevier and Nawab Zain Yar Jung Bahadur Memorial Prize-1994 by The Institution of Engineers (India), etc.

Dr. Mohan is a Fellow of the National Academy of Engineering, Telangana and Andhra Pradesh Academy of Sciences, Biotech Research Society of India, International Forum on Industrial Bioprocesses, Institution of Engineers, and International Society for Energy, Environment, and Sustainability. He also serves on the Editorial Boards of prominent journals, including Bioresource Technology, Transactions of the Indian National Academy of Engineering, Environmental Technology, Materials Circular Economy, etc.
