= B. V. Rajarama Bhat =

Indian mathematician

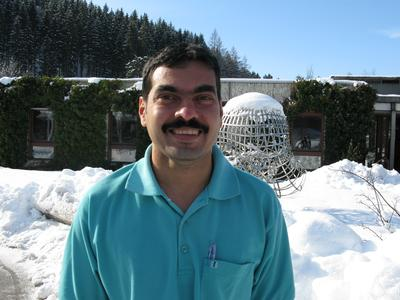
- Bhat in July 2013
- Born: 16 January 1966
- Education: Indian Statistical Institute, Kolkata
- Awards: Shanti Swarup Bhatnagar Prize for Science and Technology
- Scientific career
- Fields: Operator theory in mathematics
- Workplaces: Indian Statistical Institute, Bangalore
- Doctoral advisor: Kalyanapuram Rangachari Parthasarathy

B. V. Rajarama Bhat is an Indian mathematician specialising in operator theory. He is a Professor of Mathematics in Indian Statistical Institute, Bangalore.

Professor Bhat obtained his MSc and PhD degrees from the Indian Statistical Institute, Kolkata.

He was awarded the Shanti Swarup Bhatnagar Prize for Science and Technology in 2007, the highest science award in India, in the mathematical sciences category.

== Other awards/honours ==
- Young Scientist Award of Indian National Science Academy in 1997
- B. M. Birla Science prize for the year 1998

== Books authored ==
- Lectures on Operator Theory, (Editor jointly with G. Elliott and P. Fillmore), Fields Institute for Research in Mathematical Sciences Monograph Series, Vol. 13, Amer. Math. Soc. 323pp. (1999).
- Cocycles of CCR flows, Memoirs of the American Mathematical Society, 149, 709 (2001).
- Dilations, Completely Positive Maps and Geometry (jointly with T. Bhattacharyya). Text and Readings in Mathematics, Hindustan Book Agency (2023).
