= Neithalath Mohan Kumar =

Indian geometer

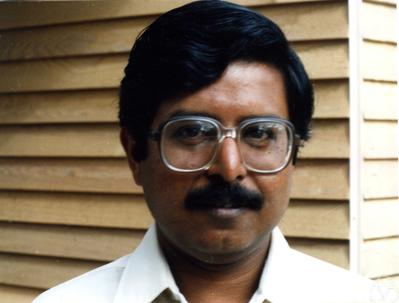
- Born: 12 May 1951 (age 75)
- Education: University of Bombay
- Known for: Forster-Eisenbud-Evans conjectures
- Awards: Shanti Swarup Bhatnagar Prize for Science and Technology
- Scientific career
- Fields: Algebra, Algebraic Geometry
- Workplaces: Washington University in St. Louis
- Doctoral advisor: S. Ramanan

Neithalath Mohan Kumar (N. Mohan Kumar) (born 12 May 1951) is an Indian mathematician who specializes in commutative algebra and algebraic geometry. Kumar is a professor emeritus in the Arts and Sciences at Washington University in St. Louis.

In 1994, he was awarded the Shanti Swarup Bhatnagar Prize for Science and Technology, the highest science award in India in the mathematical sciences category. Kumar has made profound and original contributions to commutative algebra and algebraic geometry. He is well known for his contribution settling the Eisenbud-Evans conjecture proposed by David Eisenbud. His work on rational double points on rational surfaces has also been acclaimed.
