= Dilip Kumar Ganguly =

Indian writer

D. K. Ganguly
- Born: 4 January 1940 (age 86); Kolkata, West Bengal, India
- Known for: Studies on Parkinsonism
- Awards: 1985 Shanti Swarup Bhatnagar Prize
- Scientific career
- Fields: Neurophysiology; Neuropharmacology
- Workplaces: Indian Institute of Chemical Biology

Dilip Kumar Ganguly (born 4 January 1940) is an Indian neurophysiologist, neuropharmacologist, and a former head of the Department of Pharmacology and Experimental Therapeutics and director of the Indian Institute of Chemical Biology. Born on 4 January 1940 in Kolkata, in the Indian state of West Bengal, he is known for his researches on Parkinsonism as well as for his efforts in promoting neuropharmacological studies in India, and his researches have been documented by way of several articles in per-reviewed journals. (Note: Please see Selected bibliography section) Besides, he has contributed chapters to books published by others and his work has been cited by any researchers. He is a founder fellow of the Indian Academy of Neurosciences and has served as its vice president. The Council of Scientific and Industrial Research, the apex agency of the Government of India for scientific research, awarded him the Shanti Swarup Bhatnagar Prize for Science and Technology, one of the highest Indian science awards for his contributions to Medical Sciences in 1985.

== Selected bibliography ==
- D. K. Ganguly (1976). "Antioxotremorine action of propranolol". British Journal of Pharmacology. 56 (1): 21–24. doi:10.1111/j.1476-5381.1976.tb06953.x. PMC 1666755. PMID 1252661.
- Seth P, Gajendiran M, Maitra KK, Ross HG, Ganguly DK (1993). "Evidence for D1 dopamine receptor-mediated modulation of the synaptic transmission from motor axon collaterals to Renshaw cells in the rat spinal cord". Neurosci. Lett. 158 (2): 217–20. doi:10.1016/0304-3940(93)90268-p. PMID 8233099. S2CID 24839288.
- Gajendiran M, Seth P, Ganguly DK (1996). "Involvement of the presynaptic dopamine D2 receptor in the depression of spinal reflex by apomorphine". NeuroReport. 7 (2): 513–6. doi:10.1097/00001756-199601310-00033. PMID 8730818. S2CID 12626993.
- Gupta S1, Chaudhuri T, Ganguly DK, Giri AK (2002). "Anticlastogenic effects of black tea (World blend) and its two active polyphenols theaflavins and thearubigins in vivo in Swiss albino mice". Life Sci. 69 (23) (published 2001): 2735–44. doi:10.1002/ptr.1038. PMID 12410547. S2CID 9167474.
- Das M, Sur P, Gomes A, Vedasiromoni JR, Ganguly DK (2002). "Inhibition of tumour growth and inflammation by consumption of tea". Phytother. Res. 16 (Supp. 1): 40–4. doi:10.1002/ptr.797. PMID 11933138. S2CID 35045674.
