= Vikram Kumar (physicist) =

Indian physicist

- Born: India
- Known for: Studies on semiconductor technology
- Awards: 1992 Shanti Swarup Bhatnagar Prize; 2012 MRSI Distinguished Material Scientist Award
- Scientific career
- Fields: Semiconductor physics
- Institutions: IIT Delhi

Vikram Kumar is an Indian material physicist, academic and an emeritus fellow of the Indian Institute of Technology, Delhi. He is a former director of the Sold State Physics Laboratory of IIT Delhi and is known for his studies on semiconductor technology. He has worked on ultra thin oxide MOS structures, silicon, III-V and II—VI semiconductors which is reported to have assisted in understanding their characterization. The Council of Scientific and Industrial Research, the apex agency of the Government of India for scientific research, awarded him the Shanti Swarup Bhatnagar Prize for Science and Technology, one of the highest Indian science awards, for his contributions to physical sciences in 1992. He is also a recipient of the Distinguished Materials Scientist of the Year award of the Materials Research Society of India. In 2019, he inaugurated, with colleagues, the Aryabhatt Auditorium at the “Prof. Rajendra Singh (Rajju Bhaiya) Institute of Physical Sciences for Study and Research" at the Veer Bahadur Singh Purvanchal University of Jaunpur.
