= Vinayachandran =

Vinayachandran is a surname. Notable people with the surname include:

- D. Vinayachandran (1946–2013), Indian poet
- P. N. Vinayachandran (born 1964), Indian scientist
