= Subramaniam Ramakrishnan =

Indian polymer chemist, professor and designer

- Born: 27 August 1960 (age 66); India
- Education: University of Massachusetts Amherst; Indian Institute of Technology, Bombay; University of Mumbai
- Known for: Studies on design and synthesis of controlled polymer structures
- Awards: 2002 CRSI Bronze Medal; 2002 MRSI Medal; 2005 Shanti Swarup Bhatnagar Prize
- Scientific career
- Fields: Polymer chemistry
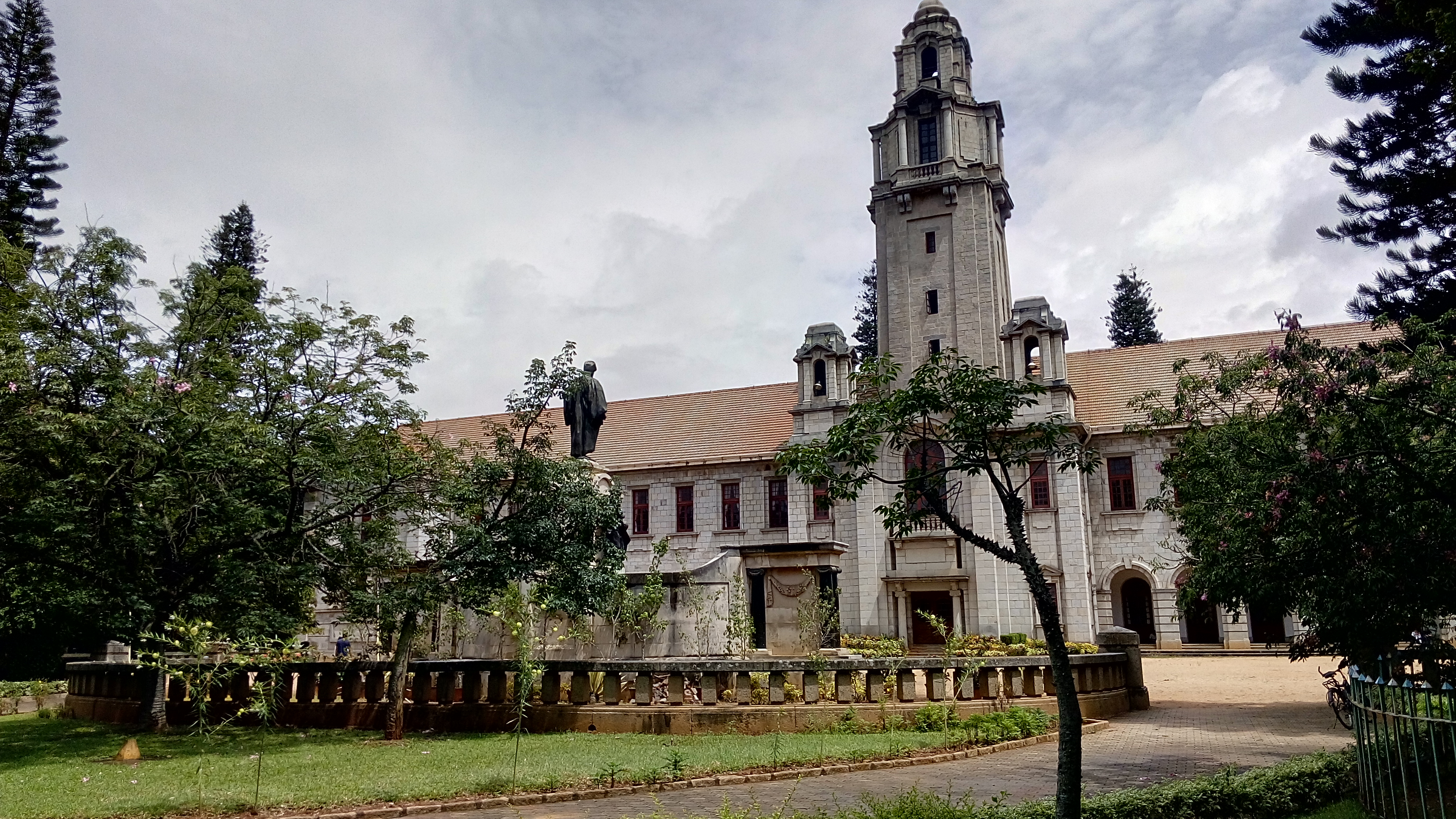
- Workplaces: Indian Institute of Science, Bangalore: Indian Institute of Science; University of Florida; Eindhoven University of Technology
- Doctoral advisor: J. C. W. Chien

Subramaniam Ramakrishnan (born 1960) is an Indian polymer chemist, a professor at the Department of Inorganic and Physical Chemistry and the designer at the Macromolecular Design and Synthesis Group of the Indian Institute of Science. He is known for his studies on design and synthesis of controlled polymer structures and is an elected fellow of the Indian Academy of Sciences. The Council of Scientific and Industrial Research, the apex agency of the Government of India for scientific research, awarded him the Shanti Swarup Bhatnagar Prize for Science and Technology, one of the highest Indian science awards, in 2005, for his contributions to chemical sciences.

== Biography ==
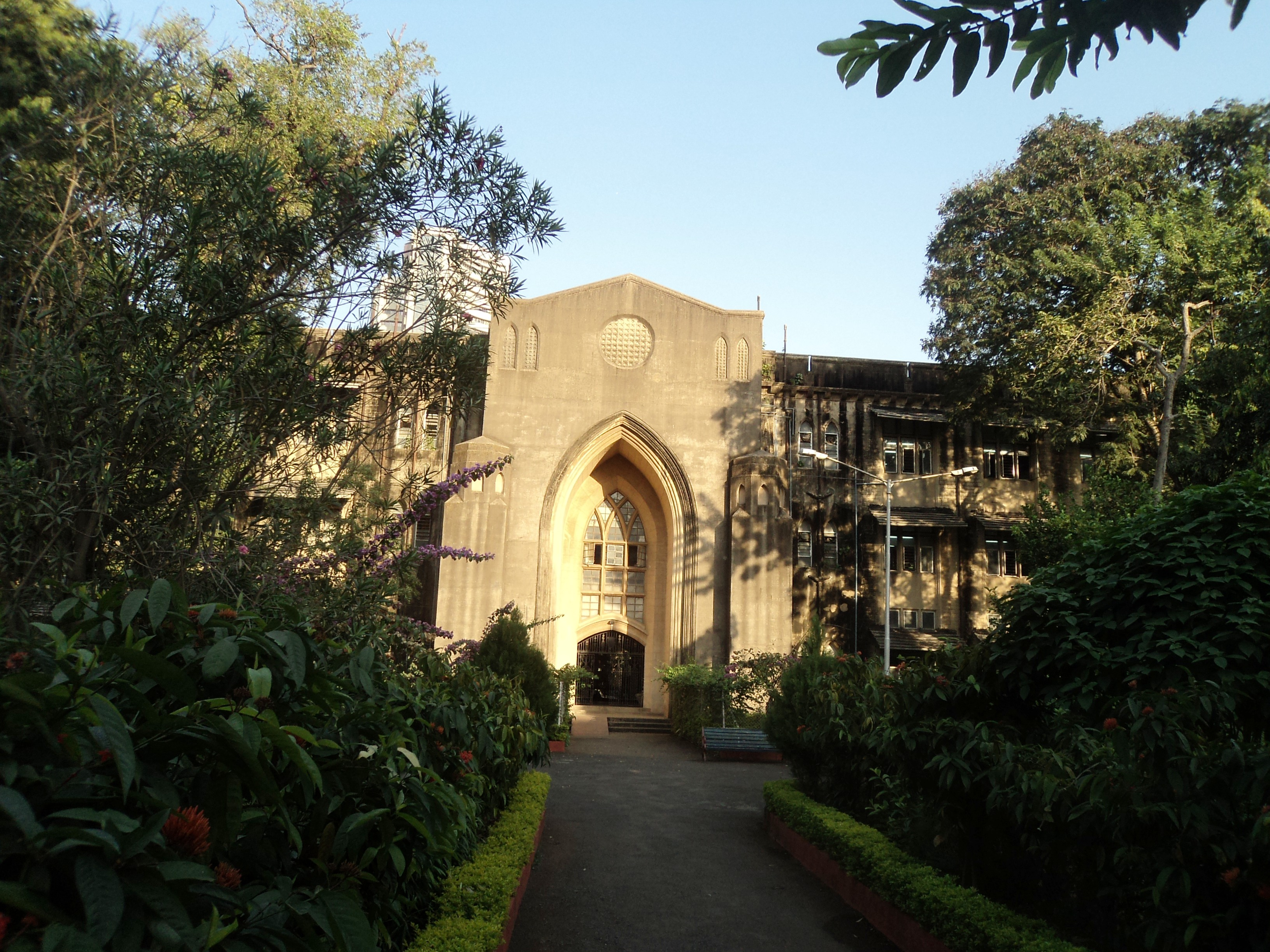
Mumbai University

Subramaniam Ramakrishnan, born on 27 August 1960, graduated in chemistry from the SIES College of Arts, Science & Commerce of Mumbai University in 1980. He joined the Indian Institute of Technology, Bombay to complete his master's degree in 1982. Moving to the US, he secured a PhD from the University of Massachusetts, Amherst in 1988, working under the guidance of J. C. W. Chien, and did his post-doctoral studies at the Corporate Research Laboratory of the Exxon Research and Engineering Company, New Jersey during 1988–90. Returning to India, he started his career at the Indian Institute of Science the same year as a lecturer where he heads the Macromolecular Design and Synthesis Group as the chief designer. http://ipc.iisc.ac.in/~rk/ During his tenure at the IISc, he held the positions of an assistant professor (1993–99) and an associate professor (1999–2005) before becoming a professor of the department of Inorganic and Physical Chemistry in 2005. In between, he had two stints abroad, first as a visiting scientist at the University of Florida (2000) and the next, as a Philips Visiting Professor at Eindhoven University of Technology (2001). Prof. Ramakrishnan also served as the deputy director at the Indian Institute of Science (2017-2019).

== Legacy and honors ==
Ramakrishnan's research is focused on the study of molecularly designed polymeric materials and the development of synthetic routes such as the transetherification route developed by his team for preparing segmented polyethylene oxide and their analogues to be used as solid polymer electrolytes. He is known to have succeeded in designing and synthesizing controlled polymer structures with predetermined properties. His team has also demonstrated that the physical properties of conjugated polymers can be modulated by tuning the average molecular conjugation length. He has documented his research by way of chapters in books edited by others and as peer-reviewed articles; Google Scholar, an online repository of scientific articles has listed 121 of them.

Ramakrishnan received the Bronze Medal of the Chemical Research Society of India and the MRSI Medal of the Material Research Society of India in 2002. The Council of Scientific and Industrial Research awarded him the Shanti Swarup Bhatnagar Prize, one of the highest Indian science awards, in 2005 and he was elected as a fellow by the Indian Academy of Sciences in 2006.

== See also ==
- C. N. R. Rao
