= Pramod Sadasheo Moharir =

Indian geophysicist

- Born: 21 April 1943; Nagpur, India
- Died: 14 January 2003 (aged 59)
- Education: IIT Bombay; IIT Kanpur
- Known for: Studies on geophysical signal processing
- Awards: 1987 Shanti Swarup Bhatnagar Prize
- Scientific career
- Fields: Geophysics
- Workplaces: BITS, Pilani; IIT Roorkee; IIT Mumbai; Indian Institute of Science; National Geophysical Research Institute

Pramod Sadasheo Moharir (21 April 1943 – 14 January 2003) was an Indian geophysicist and a former senior scientist at the National Geophysical Research Institute. He was known for his studies on geophysical signal processing.

== Biography ==
Born on 21 April 1943, Moharir obtained an MTech from the Indian Institute of Technology, Mumbai in 1966 and after securing a PhD from the Indian Institute of Technology, Kanpur in 1971 under the guidance of Kalluri Ramalinga Sarma, he started his career as a lecturer at Birla Institute of Technology and Science, Pilani but moved to the Indian Institute of Technology, Roorkee in 1972. His stay at IIT Roorkee was short-lived and the same year, he joined the Indian Institute of Science where he served as a lecturer till 1976 when he was appointed as an assistant professor at IIT Mumbai. After one year, he returned to IIT Roorkee and served the institute as a reader and professor until 1989. His next move was to the National Geophysical Research Institute as a visiting scientist but became a senior scientist in 1992 and served there till his death on 14 January 2003 succumbing to a brain haemorrhage, at the age of 59.

Moharir's researches were focused on the resolving the problems of modelling of earthquake sequences as well as on designing numerical algorithms for earth system models. He was the author of a book on the subject titled, Pattern Recognition Transforms. The Council of Scientific and Industrial Research, the apex agency of the Government of India for scientific research, awarded him the Shanti Swarup Bhatnagar Prize for Science and Technology, one of the highest Indian science awards for his contributions to Earth, Atmosphere, Ocean and Planetary Sciences in 1987. (Note: Long link - please select award year to see details)
