= Govindan Rangarajan =

Indian mathematician

Govindan Rangarajan FNAS
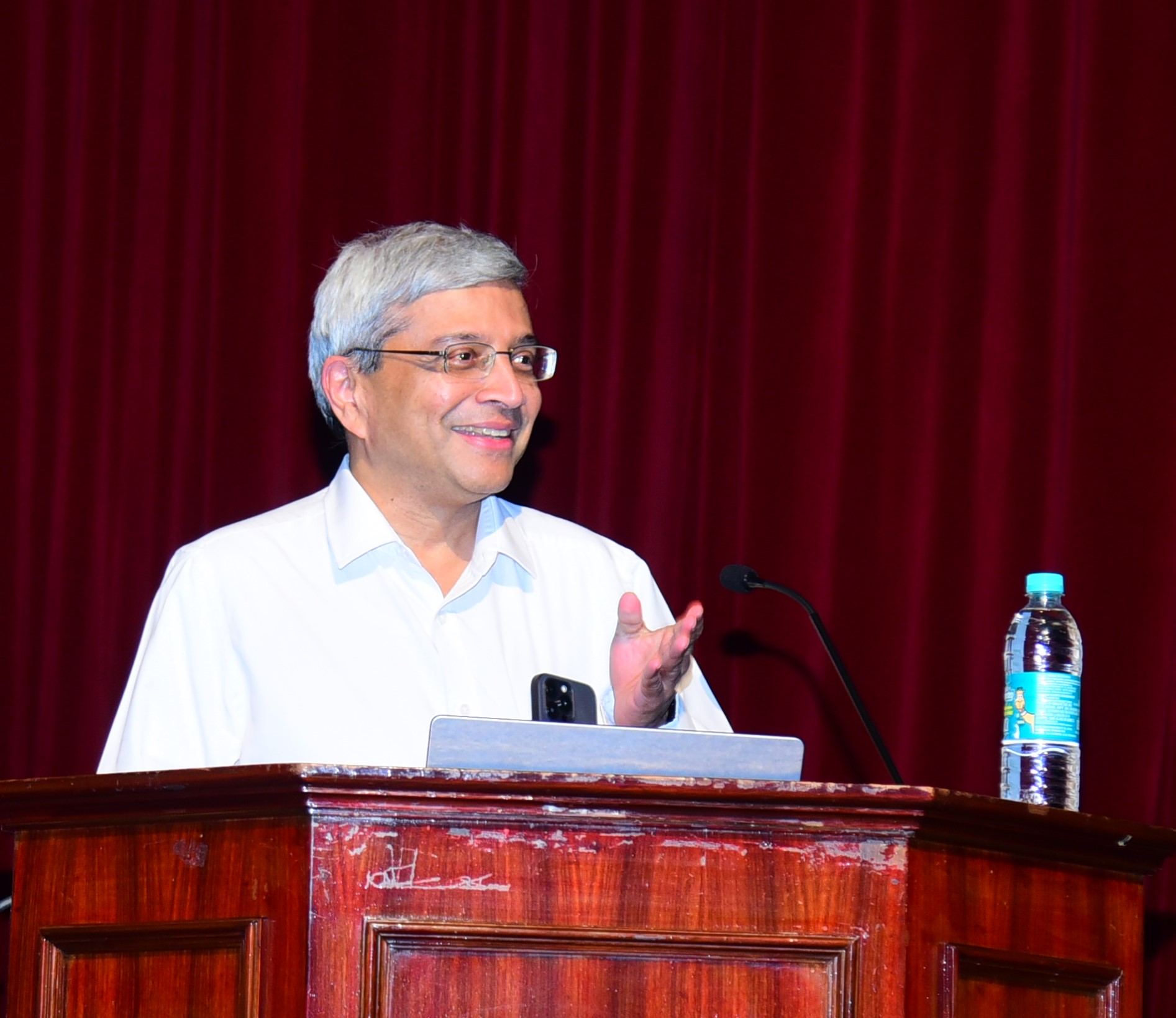
- Rangarajan in 2023
- Born: 18 September 1963 (age 62)
- Citizenship: Indian
- Education: BITS Pilani (Integrated MSc.); University of Maryland, College Park (PhD)
- Occupations: Director, Indian Institute of Science
- Awards: • Knight of the Order of Palms (2006) • Fellowship of National Academy of Sciences
- Website: http://math.iisc.ac.in/~rangaraj/

Govindan Rangarajan, FNAS (born 18 September 1963) is an Indian mathematician, academician, and a professor. He is currently serving as the director of the Indian Institute of Science (IISc) at Bangalore, India and as a professor in the Department of Mathematics at the same.

== Education and career ==
Rangarajan obtained his integrated Master of Science degree with honours from BITS Pilani, in 1985, and his PhD degree from the University of Maryland, College Park, in 1990. He was a staff scientist in the Lawrence Berkeley Laboratory, University of California, Berkeley, before joining the Indian Institute of Science as an assistant professor in 1992.

Rangarajan's research areas include nonlinear dynamics, chaos, time series analysis, and computational biology. His work is applied in areas such as neuroscience, geophysics and accelerator physics.

As a co-principal investigator of the Indo-French Cyber University Project, he helped establish the first inter-continental satellite-based courses. These courses were taught live to Indian and French students in various subject areas. He also headed the National Mathematics Initiative, which ran instructional schools and workshops in cutting-edge areas at the interface between mathematics and other fields. He was instrumental in setting up and running the interdisciplinary PhD programme in mathematical sciences. He also headed the Indo-US Virtual Institute for Mathematics and Statistical Sciences, which was jointly set up by the National Science Foundation and the Indo-US Science and Technology Forum, India.

Rangarajan is currently the director of the Indo-French Centre for Applied Mathematics (IFCAM), the first Unités Mixtes Internationales of CNRS in India. This is a joint venture between the Department of Science and Technology, India, and a consortium of French institutions. IFCAM supports joint research projects between India and France in the broad area of applied mathematics.

Rangarajan has also served as the chairman of the Department of Mathematics and Convener, Digital Information Services Centre from 2002 to 2008. He was the chairman of the International Relations Cell (now called the Office of International Relations) from 2008 to 2014. Most recently, he was chaired the Division of Interdisciplinary Research, comprising 10 departments and centres, from 2014 to 2020. He also headed IISc's fundraising and alumni outreach efforts in his role as Chairman of the Office of Development and Alumni Affairs from 2015 to 2020.

== Awards and recognition ==
Rangarajan was awarded the Homi Bhabha Fellowship in 2001. He was also awarded the Chevalier dans l'Ordre des Palmes Academiques (Knight of the Order of Academic Palms) by the Government of France in 2006. He has been elected a Fellow of the Indian Academy of Sciences and the National Academy of Sciences, India.

Rangarajan is an honorary professor of the Jawaharlal Nehru Centre for Advanced Scientific Research, Bangalore, India. He has been awarded the J.C. Bose National Fellowship for the 2011-2021 decade. He is also a recipient of the BITS Distinguished Alumnus Award.

== See also ==
- Indian Institute of Science
- Birla Institute of Technology & Science, Pilani
- University of Maryland, College Park
