= Suryanarayanasastry Ramasesha =

Indian quantum chemist (born 1950)

- Born: 16 January 1950 (age 76); Karnataka, India
- Education: Bangalore University; Indian Institute of Technology, Kanpur; Indian Institute of Science; Oxford University; Louisiana State University; Princeton University
- Known for: Studies on conjugated organic systems and low-dimensional solids
- Awards: 1978 INSA Young Scientists' Medal 1990 B. M. Birla Science Prize; 1992 Shanti Swarup Bhatnagar Prize; CRSI Silver Medal; IISc Alumni Award
- Scientific career
- Fields: Quantum theory; Molecular electronics
- Workplaces: Indian Institute of Science; Princeton University; University of Arizona; Bordeaux University; École normale supérieure de Cachan; University of Mons-Hainaut; Institute for Molecular Spectroscopy (CNR) Bologna; Jawaharlal Nehru Centre for Advanced Scientific Research

Suryanarayanasastry Ramasesha (born 16 January 1950) is an Indian quantum chemist and a former Dean of the Faculty of Science at the Indian Institute of Science. He is a former chair of the Solid State and Structural Chemistry Unit and Amrut Modi Chair professor of Chemical Sciences at IISc. He is known for his studies on conjugated organic systems and low-dimensional solids and is an elected fellow of the Indian National Science Academy, the Indian Academy of Sciences and The World Academy of Sciences. The Council of Scientific and Industrial Research, the apex agency of the Government of India for scientific research, awarded him the Shanti Swarup Bhatnagar Prize for Science and Technology, one of the highest Indian science awards, in 1992, for his contributions to chemical sciences.

== Biography ==
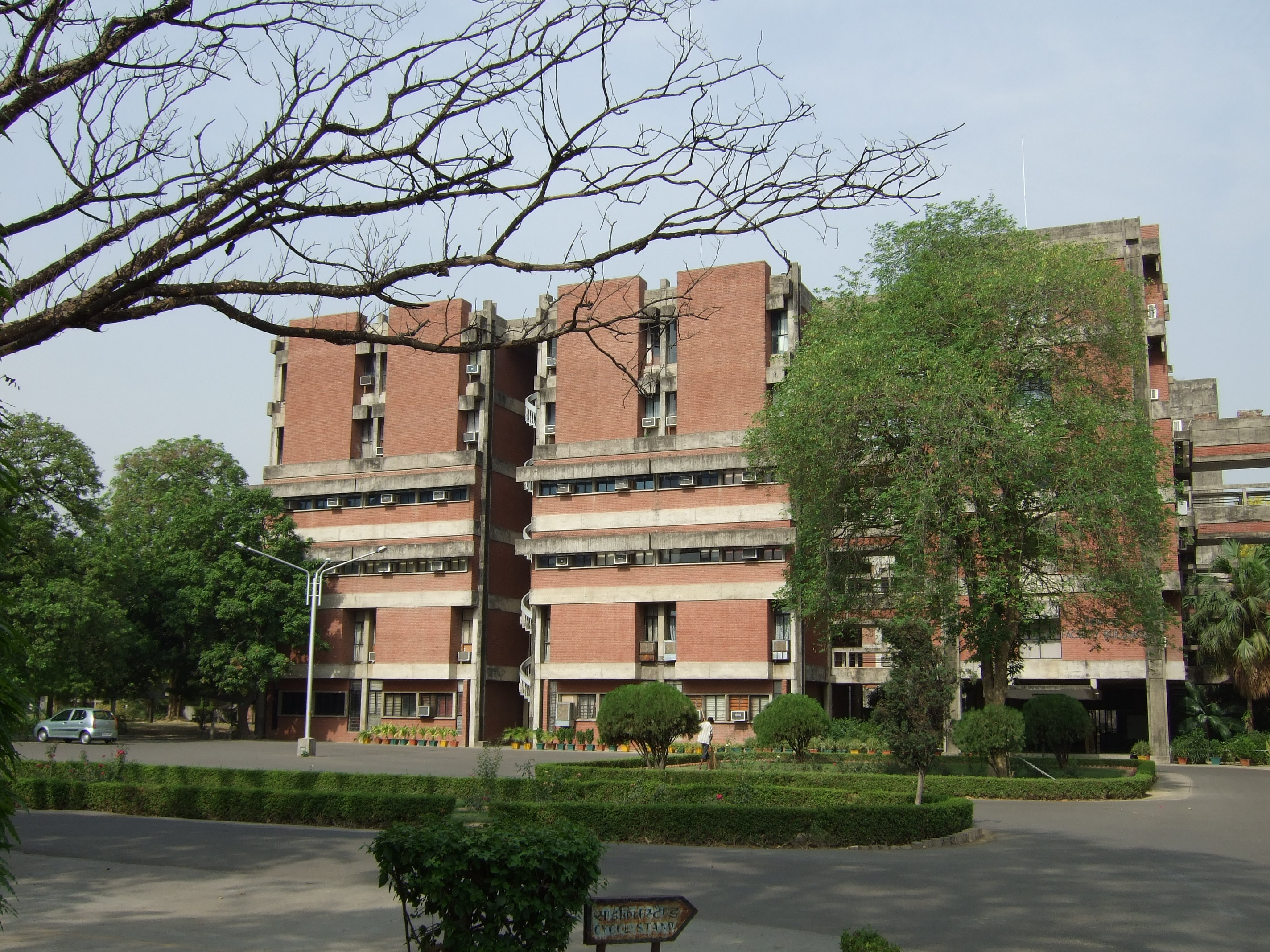
IIT Kanpur

S. Ramasesha, born in the south Indian state of Karnataka on 16 January 1950, completed his BSc (Hons) (1968) from Bangalore University before securing MSc (1970) and PhD (1977) from the Indian Institute of Technology, Kanpur. Moving back to his home state, he did his post-doctoral studies at the Indian Institute of Science as well as at Oxford University, Louisiana State University, and Princeton University. He started his career in 1984 as a member of faculty at the Indian Institute of Science where he spent his entire academic career, serving in such different positions as professor and chair of Solid State and Structural Chemistry Unit (1992–97), as the Amrut Modi Chair professor of Chemical Sciences (2000-003) and as Dean, faculty of science (from 2014) to superannuate from service in 2015. In between, he has served as a visiting professor at Princeton University, University of Arizona, Bordeaux University, École normale supérieure de Cachan, and University of Mons-Hainaut.

== Legacy ==
Ramasesha is known to have conducted extensive researches on the electronic structure and nonlinear properties of conjugated organic systems and low-dimensional solids using the Valence Bond method. His researches have assisted in designing new protocols for the development of many-body models for investigating large molecules, low-dimensional materials and real time dynamics. When Jawaharlal Nehru Centre for Advanced Scientific Research established its first computer laboratory, Ramsesha served as its founder head and has also served as the convenor of the National Centre for Science Information of the Indian Institute of Science. He has published over 240 peer-reviewed articles and guided 23 research scholars in their doctoral studies.

== Awards and honors ==
The Indian National Science Academy awarded Ramasesha the Young Scientists' Medal in 1978 and he received the B. M. Birla Science Prize in 1990. The Council of Scientific and Industrial Research awarded him the Shanti Swarup Bhatnagar Prize, one of the highest Indian science awards, in 1992. A J. C. Bose National Fellow, he is also a recipient of the Silver Medal of the Chemical Research Society of India and the Alumni Award for Excellence in Research of the Indian Institute of Science. He is an elected fellow of the Indian National Science Academy, Indian Academy of Sciences and The World Academy of Sciences,. He was awarded the Sir M. Visvesvaraya life-time achievement award by the government of Karnataka, for the year 2018. He was conferred the Honorary Fellowship of the Karnataka Science and Technology Academy in 2020. He was also conferred the Chemical Research Society of India Gold Medal for lifetime achievement.
