= Sandhya Srikant Visweswariah =

Indian scientist and academic

Prof. Sandhya Srikant Visweswariah
- Born: March 6, 1957 (age 69)
- Occupation: Scientist/Academic

Academic background
- Education: Ph.D.
- Alma mater: Indian Institute of Science
- Thesis: (1987)

Academic work
- Discipline: Biology
- Sub-discipline: Biochemistry, Cell Biology
- Institutions: Indian Institute of Science
- Main interests: Research on signal transduction mediated by cyclic nucleotides
- Website: http://mrdg.iisc.ernet.in/sandhyav/index.htm

Sandhya Srikant Visweswariah is a scientist and academic at the Indian Institute of Science, Bangalore, India. She was the Chairperson of the Department of Developmental Biology and Genetics and the Co-chair of the Department of Bioengineering, Indian Institute of Science. She additionally holds the position of Adjunct Professor, Faculty of Medicine and Dentistry, University of Bergen, Norway. Her research involves the investigation of the mechanism of signal transduction via cyclic nucleotides, phosphodiesterases and novel cyclases in bacteria. Most recently, she was awarded a Bill and Melinda Gates Grand Challenges Explorations Grant for her proposal entitled "A Small Animal Model of ETEC-Mediated Diarrhea".

== Education ==
Visweswariah completed her Bachelor of Science in 1977 at Osmania University, Hyderabad, majoring in Botany, Chemistry and Zoology. She then obtained a Master of Science degree in chemistry from the Indian Institute of Technology, Kanpur in 1980. She proceeded to enrol at the PhD programme at the Department of Biochemistry, Indian Institute of Science and was awarded her doctorate in 1987.

== Career ==
Visweswariah started her career as a Post-Doctoral Fellow at Astra Research Centre, Bangalore in 1987-1988. After a year at the Astra Research Centre, she was promoted to a scientist position at the same organization, where she stayed on until 1993. In 1993, she was appointed as Assistant Professor at the Department of Molecular Reproduction, Development and Genetics, Indian Institute of Science, where she has held a position since, being promoted to Associate Professor in 1995 and then to Professor in 2005. She is currently the Chairperson of the Department of Molecular Reproduction, Development and Genetics, Indian Institute of Science, Bangalore and Co-chair of the Centre for Biosystems Science and Engineering, Indian Institute of Science. Over the course of 29 years as faculty at the Indian Institute of Science, Visweswariah has mentored more than 30 PhD students.

== Membership in professional bodies and editorial boards ==
Visweswariah is a fellow of the Indian National Science Academy and the Indian Academy of Sciences: Third World Organisation for women in science. She is a life member of the Society of Biological Chemists (India), Indian Society of Cell Biology (1995–present) and the Society of Research in Reproduction, India (1994–present). Additionally, she is a member of Guha Research Council, India (1997–present), the Alliance for Cell Signalling (1997–present), the TB Structural Genomics Consortium, the American Society for Biochemistry and Molecular Biology (ASBMB), and the American Society for Microbiology (ASM).

She serves an Associate Editor of Frontiers in Cellular Endocrinology.

== Awards and fellowships ==
- Gold Medal in Botany, B.Sc. 1978.
- Indian National Science Academy Medal for Young Scientists, 1988.
- Awarded a Short-Term Associateship by the Department of Biotechnology, Government of India for a three-month visit to University of Missouri at Columbia, United States, 1998.
- Recipient of Human Frontier Science Program (HFSP) Short Term Fellowship (2002) to visit University of California, Berkeley in the laboratory of Prof. John Kuriyan.
- Awarded the Central Drug Research Institute Award for Excellence in Drug Research, 2005.
- Recipient of YT Thathachari Award 2009.
- Recipient of a Royal Society International Joint Project with Dr. Roger Buxton, National Institute for Medical Research, UK, London, 2008-2011.
- Fulbright-Nehru Senior Research Fellowship, 2011-2012, spent at the lab of Dr. Sabine Ehrt, Weill Cornell Medical College, New York City, United States.
- AstraZeneca Research Chair Professor, Indian Institute of Science, August 2012 – 2015.
- JC Bose Fellow, 2013–present.
- Recipient of a Bill and Melinda Gates Grand Challenges Explorations Grant, 2014.
- In 2018, she became the fellow of TWAS .
- National Science Chair, SERB 2023–present
- Provost's Visiting Professor, Imperial College London (Sept 2023-Sept 2024)

== Publications ==
Visweswariah more than 100 publications in peer-reviewed journals and 5 book chapters to her credit, with a total citation count of over 2000. The full list of publications from the Visweswariah lab can be found on PubMed and ResearchGate.
