= Martin Onslow Forster =

British chemist (1872–1945)

- Born: 8 November 1872; London
- Died: 24 May 1945 (aged 72); Mysore, India.
- Awards: Longstaff Prize (1915)
- Scientific career
- Fields: Chemistry
- Workplaces: Indian Institute of Science

Sir Martin Onslow Forster, FRS (8 November 1872 – 24 May 1945) was a chemist and a director of the Indian Institute of Science in Bangalore, India.

Forster was born in Lambeth, London. One of four children of Martin Forster, a bank clerk and his wife Ann Hope Limby, he schooled at Dane Hill House (or Boulden's), Margate and in 1888 went to Finsbury Technical College to pursue his interest in chemistry. Further studies and a certificate were achieved in industry. He undertook research under Raphael Meldola and later with Emil Fischer at the University of Würzburg where he obtained a Ph.D. in 1892. He then returned to England and worked under W. A. Tilden at Mason College, Birmingham followed by research under H. E. Armstrong at the Central Technical College, South Kensington. Here he received a fellowship from Salters' Company and studied the chemistry of camphor. In 1895 he was offered a post of demonstrator in chemistry at the Royal College of Science where his former advisor Tilden had moved. He received a Granville scholarship and joined the University of London in 1899 and became an assistant professor of chemistry in 1902. Forster retired in 1913 with an intention to join politics but returned to research in the chemical industry as a consultant for the dye industry in 1914. In 1915 he headed the technical committee for British Dyes Limited and became its director in 1916. He resigned from the company following troubles and joined the Salters' Institute of Industrial Chemistry which allowed him to conduct experiments at the Davy-Faraday Laboratories.

Forster was an impressive speaker but his leadership was considered poor. He was considered to be aloof, having an air of superiority and was unpopular in Britain. However, his career in India was more successful. On the recommendation of Sir W.J. Pope, he became a director of the Indian Institute of Science at Bangalore. His administration earned him respect among the staff and students. Although retired in 1927 with a knighthood bestowed on him, he stayed on till 1933. He then settled in Mysore.

Forster was married twice, first to Madeleine Nichols, daughter of an American chemist in 1907 and they divorced in 1916. In 1925 he married Elena Josefina. He had no children and died in Mysore, India.
