= Gundabathula Venkateswara Rao =

Indian materials engineer (born 1944)

- Born: 9 November 1944 (age 81); Krishna District, Andhra Pradesh, India
- Education: Indian Institute of Science
- Awards: 1989 Shanti Swarup Bhatnagar Prize
- Scientific career
- Fields: Finite element method; Structural analysis; Smart materials

Gundabathula Venkateswara Rao (born 9 November 1944 in Krishna District) is an Indian materials engineer, known for his studies in the field of Structural mechanics. Focusing his researches on Finite element method, Structural analysis and Smart materials, he and his colleagues developed FEAST, a medium-sized program for laboratory research and industrial applications including design and analysis of rocket systems. An alumnus of the Indian Institute of Science from where he secured a PhD, his researches have been documented in several peer-reviewed articles and his work has been cited by several scientists. Google Scholar, an online article repository of scientific articles, has listed a number of his articles. The Indian Academy of Sciences elected him as a fellow in 2003. The Council of Scientific and Industrial Research, the apex agency of the Government of India for scientific research, awarded him the Shanti Swarup Bhatnagar Prize for Science and Technology, one of the highest Indian science awards for his contributions to Engineering Sciences in 1989.
