= Vijay Balakrishna Shenoy =

Indian physicist

Prof. Vijay B. Shenoy
- Born: India
- Citizenship: India
- Education: Brown University
- Known for: Rashbons, Topological insulators, Ultracold Quantum Gases, Optical lattices, High T_{c} Superconductors, Superfluidity, Graphene
- Children: 1 Son
- Awards: 2024 Asian Scientist 100; 2013 Shanti Swarup Bhatnagar Prize; 2011 Fellow IAS, Raja Ramanna Prize; 2009 NASI-Scopus Young Scientist Award; 2005 INAE Young Engineer Award; 2002 INSA Medal for Young Scientist
- Scientific career
- Fields: Condensed matter physics
- Workplaces: Indian Institute of Science
- Website: http://www.physics.iisc.ac.in/~shenoy/

Vijay Balakrishna Shenoy is a Professor of Physics at the Indian Institute of Science, Bangalore, India. He was awarded the Shanti Swarup Bhatnagar Prize for science and technology, the highest science award in India, for the year 2013 in the physical sciences category.

== Biography ==
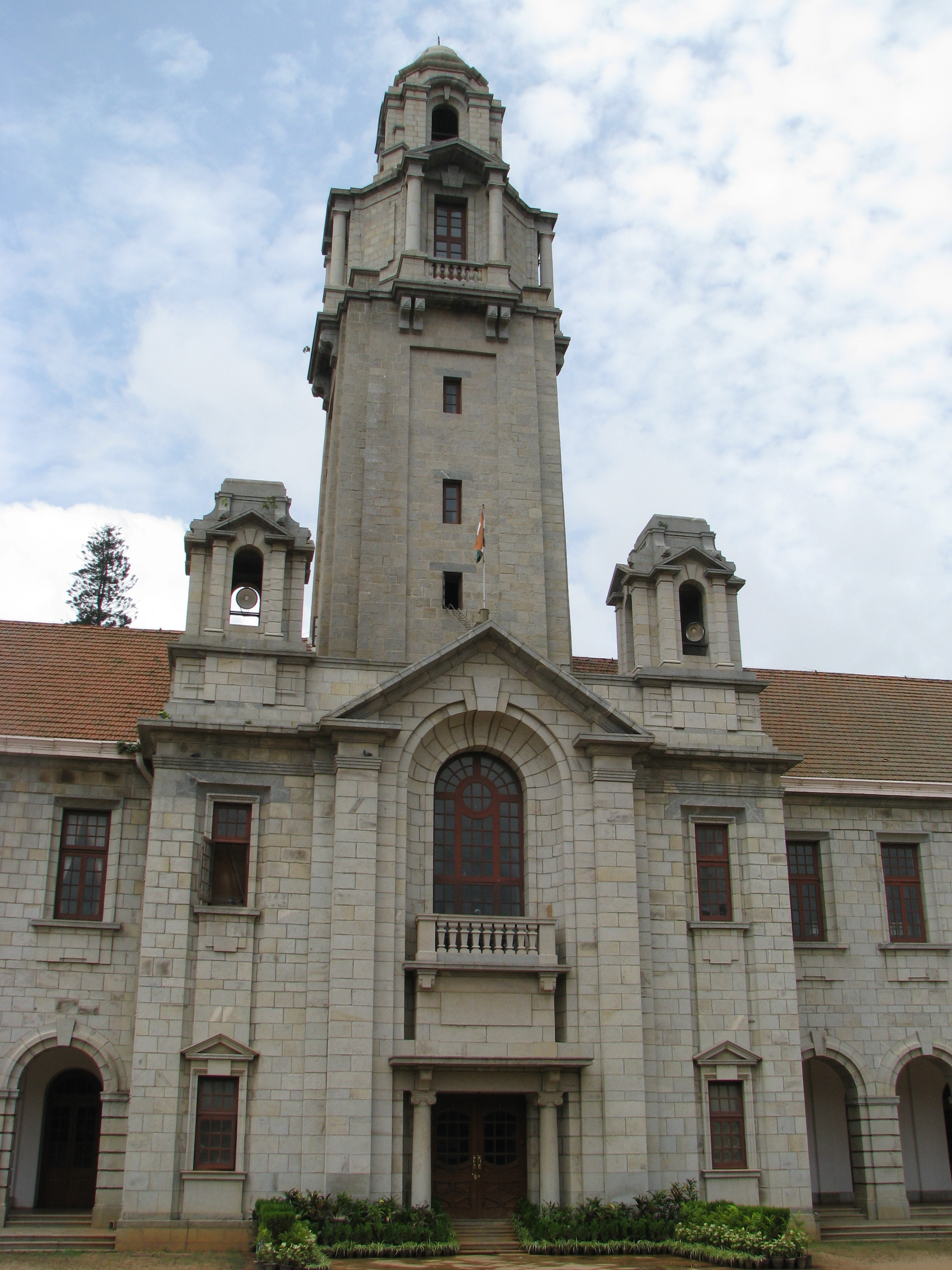
Indian Institute of Science

Vijay B. Shenoy obtained his B.Tech. (Mechanical) from IIT, Madras in 1992 and his M.S. from Georgia Tech. in 1994. He received his Doctorate degree from Brown University in 1998. For a short period he took Adjunct Assistant Professorship in Brown University in 1999. Later he joined the faculty of IIT, Kanpur from 1999 to 2002. In 2002, he joined Indian Institute of Science. Currently he works on theoretical condensed matter physics with focus on strongly interacting/correlated fermionic systems.

== Research ==
His work on the Rashbon is said to have opened a new range of possibilities and new directions for physics.
