= Sagar Sengupta =

Indian immunologist and cancer biologist

- Born: West Bengal, India
- Education: University of Calcutta; Indian Institute of Science; IGBMC; National Institutes of Health
- Known for: Studies on tumor suppressor gene and oncogenes
- Awards: 2011 N-BIOS Prize
- Scientific career
- Fields: Immunology; Oncology
- Workplaces: National Institute of Immunology, India; National Institute of Biomedical Genomics, India

Sagar Sengupta is an Indian cancer biologist, a scientist at the National Institute of Immunology, India and Director, National Institute of Biomedical Genomics, Kalyani, India. Known for his studies on genome integrity, tumor suppressor gene and oncogenes, Sengupta is an elected fellow of all the three major Indian science academies namely the National Academy of Sciences, India, the Indian National Science Academy and the Indian Academy of Sciences. He has been a Jagadish Chandra Bose (JC Bose) Fellow since 2018. The Department of Biotechnology of the Government of India awarded him the National Bioscience Award for Career Development, one of the highest Indian science awards, for his contributions to biosciences, in 2011.

== Biography ==
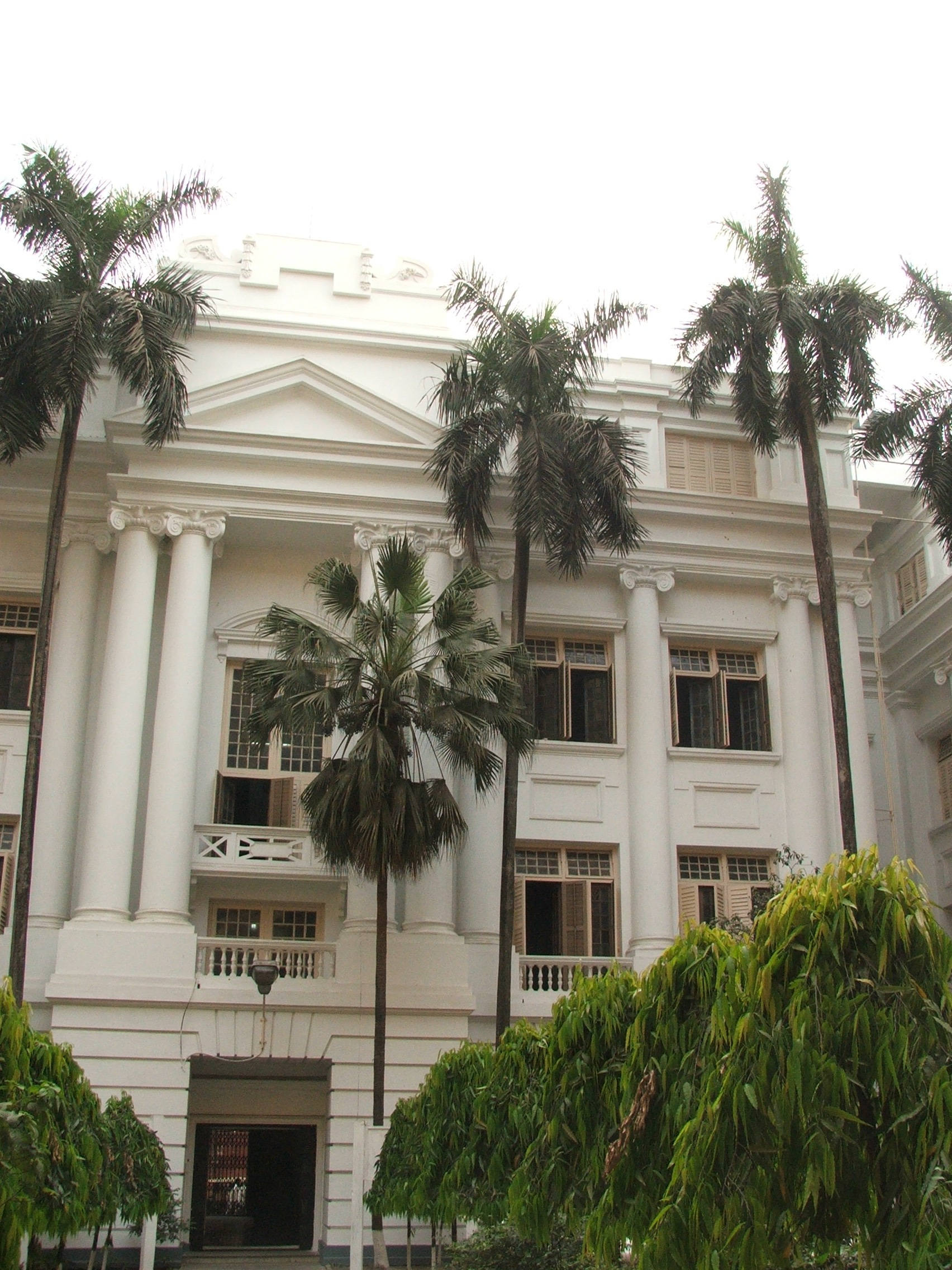
University of Calcutta

Sagar Sengupta was born in the Indian state of West Bengal, earned a postgraduate degree from the University of Calcutta and secured a PhD from the Indian Institute of Science. He did his post doctoral studies at the Institut de Genetique et de Biologie Moleculaire et Cellulaire (IGBMC) in Strasbourg, France and completed it at the National Cancer Institute of the National Institutes of Health. Subsequently, he joined the National Institute of Immunology, India in 2004 as a faculty. He served in National Institute of Immunology till 2022 as a Grade VII Staff Scientist. In November 2022, Sengupta became the Director of National Institute of Biomedical Genomics, Kalyani, West Bengal on deputation from National Institute of Immunology. From November 2023, he hasalso been Director (Additional Charge) of National Brain Research Centre, Manesar, Haryana. The permanent residence of Sengupta is in Gurgaon, Haryana.

== Professional profile ==
Sengupta's research focus is on the changes in the signaling pathways during cancer development and he has carried out studies on the tumour suppressor genes and oncogenes. During his post-doctoral days at the National Institutes of Health (NIH), he undertook a project on NIH grant to study the Determination of regulatory mechanisms for BLM helicase. His studies have been documented by way of a number of articles (Note: Please see Selected bibliography section) and ResearchGate, an online repository of scientific articles has listed over 50 of them. The complete list of his publications can be found at: https://www.ncbi.nlm.nih.gov/myncbi/1t7wpVLc8yt/bibliography/public/

He has also undertaken several projects on behalf of the government agencies such as the Department of Science and Technology, the Science and Engineering Research Board, the Department of Biotechnology and the Council of Scientific and Industrial Research and the Board of Research in Nuclear Sciences as the principal investigator and is associated with the Department of Biotechnology as a member of its Task force on Cancer Biology, the expert committee on Promotion and Popularization of Biotechnology and the Expert Committee for Twinning RD program for North Eastern Region.

== Awards and honors ==
Sengupta received the Best Thesis Award for his doctoral thesis from the Indian Institute of Science in 1997. The Department of Biotechnology (DBT) of the Government of India awarded him the National Bioscience Award for Career Development, one of the highest Indian science awards in 2011. The National Academy of Sciences, India elected him as a fellow in 2012 and he became an elected fellow of the Indian Academy of Sciences and the Indian National Science Academy in 2017. He is also a member of the Guha Research Conference. He has been a Jagadish Chandra Bose (JC Bose) Fellow since 2018.

== Selected bibliography ==
=== Articles ===
- Sengupta, Sagar; Harris, Curtis C. (2005). "p53: traffic cop at the crossroads of DNA repair and recombination". Nature Reviews Molecular Cell Biology. 6 (1): 44–55. doi:10.1038/nrm1546. ISSN 1471-0080. PMID 15688066. S2CID 11972657.
- Sengupta, Sagar; Robles, Ana I.; Linke, Steven P.; Sinogeeva, Natasha I.; Zhang, Ran; Pedeux, Remy; Ward, Irene M.; Celeste, Arkady; Nussenzweig, André (13 September 2004). "Functional interaction between BLM helicase and 53BP1 in a Chk1-mediated pathway during S-phase arrest". J Cell Biol. 166 (6): 801–813. doi:10.1083/jcb.200405128. ISSN 0021-9525. PMC 2172115. PMID 15364958.
- Sengupta, Sagar; Wasylyk, Bohdan (15 September 2001). "Ligand-dependent interaction of the glucocorticoid receptor with p53 enhances their degradation by Hdm2". Genes & Development. 15 (18): 2367–2380. doi:10.1101/gad.202201. ISSN 0890-9369. PMC 312780. PMID 11562347.

== See also ==
- TP53
- Glucocorticoid receptor
