= Srinivasan Sampath =

Indian electrochemist, nanotechnologist and professor

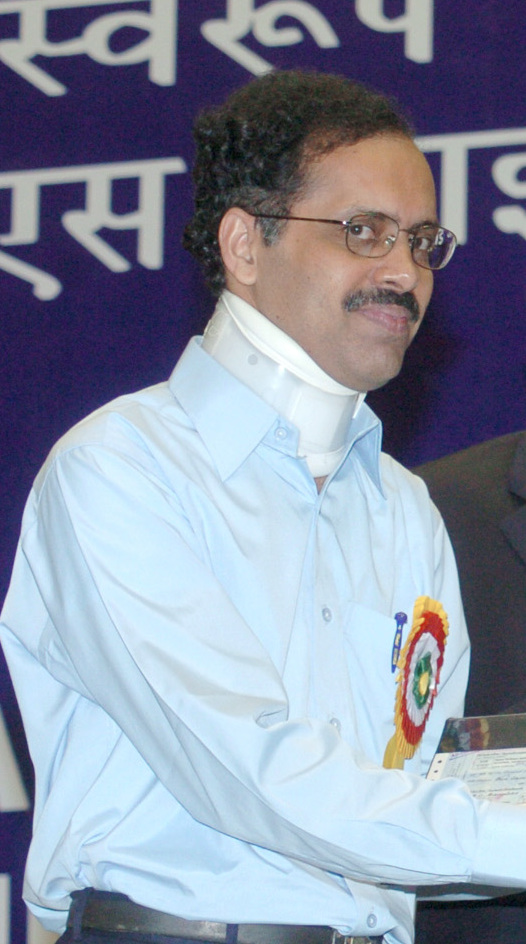
- Srinivasan Sampath in 2006
- Born: 25 May 1961 (age 65); India
- Known for: Studies on Electrochemicail energy storage and nanomaterials
- Awards: 2005 CRSI Bronze and Silver Medals; 2006 Shanti Swarup Bhatnagar Prize
- Scientific career
- Fields: Electrochemistry; Nanomaterials
- Workplaces: Indian Institute of Science

Srinivasan Sampath (born 1961) is a Physical Chemist specializing in the area of Electrochemistry - surfaces and interfaces. He is a senior professor at the Department of Inorganic and Physical Chemistry at Indian Institute of Science. His work involves understanding interfacial properties related to various energy systems - Batteries, fuel cells and supercapacitors and sensors. He is an elected fellow of the Indian Academy of Sciences, Indian National Science Academy, Indian National Academy of Engineering (INAE) and The World Academy of Sciences (TWAS). The Council of Scientific and Industrial Research, the apex agency of the Government of India for scientific research, awarded him the Shanti Swarup Bhatnagar Prize for Science and Technology, one of the highest Indian science awards, in 2006, for his contributions to chemical sciences.

== Biography ==
Srinivasan Sampath, born on 25 February 1961, is a Professor at the Department of Inorganic and Physical Chemistry of the Indian Institute of Science where he is involved in research on interfacial properties of materials and surfaces. His work involves understanding various interfaces involving solid-liquid; solid-solid and liquid like-liquid interfaces using electrochemistry, spectroscopy and microscopy. His group carries out in situ (operando) spectroelectrochemistry (Raman-; IR- electrochemistry) and in situ X ray diffraction coupled with electrochemistry to understand electrochemical reactions at electrode-electrolyte interfaces. He has documented his research in several peer-reviewed articles (230 peer reviewed papers); the online article repository has listed 78 of them. He received the Bronze and Silver Medals of the Chemical Research Society of India in 2005 and Material Research Society of India (MRSI) medal.

== See also ==
- Supercapacitors
