= Chandrashekhar S. Jog =

Chandrashekhar S. Jog is a professor in the department of mechanical engineering at Indian Institute of Science. He works in the areas of Solid mechanics, Continuum mechanics, and Finite element methods. He has authored books on Continuum mechanics, and Fluid mechanics.
