= Ganapati Shankar Bhat =

Indian geophysicist

- Born: 31 August 1957 (age 68); Yellapur, Uttara Kannada, India
- Education: IIT Mumbai; Indian Institute of Science
- Known for: Studies on atmospheric convective processes and air-sea interactions
- Awards: 2001 Physical Research Laboratory Award; 2002 S. S. Bhatnagar Prize; 2006 GoK Prof. Satish Dhawan Young Engineer Award
- Scientific career
- Fields: Atmospheric Sciences; Oceanography
- Workplaces: Indian Institute of Science

Ganapati Shankar Bhat (born 31 August 1957) is an Indian geophysicist and the chairman of the Centre for Atmospheric and Oceanic Sciences of the Indian Institute of Science. He is known for his studies on atmospheric convective processes and air-sea interactions and is an elected fellow of the Indian Academy of Sciences. The Council of Scientific and Industrial Research, the apex agency of the Government of India for scientific research, awarded him the Shanti Swarup Bhatnagar Prize for Science and Technology, one of the highest Indian science awards for his contributions to Earth, Atmosphere, Ocean and Planetary Sciences in 2002. (Note: Long link - please select award year to see details)

== Biography ==
G. S. Bhat, born on 31 August 1957 in the Indian state of Yellapur, Karnataka, did his graduate studies in mechanical engineering at the Indian Institute of Technology Mumbai in 1981 and obtained his master's degree from the Indian Institute of Science in 1983. Subsequently, he enrolled at IISc for his doctoral studies and secured a PhD in 1990. His career started as a scientific assistant at IISc and he has been serving the institute where he holds the chair of the Centre for Atmospheric and Oceanic Sciences since 2006. At IISc, he served as a scientific officer (1989–91), assistant professor (1991–97), associate professor (1997–2003) and a professor (2003–). In between, he had a short stint at Florida State University during 1997–98 as a visiting scientist.

Bhat is known to have done extensive studies on the air-sea interactions and his studies have assisted in widening the understanding of atmospheric convective processes. His studies have been documented in several peer-reviewed articles; (Note: Please see Selected bibliography section) ResearchGate, an online repository of scientific articles, has listed 59 of them. He served as the principal investigator of the Bay of Bengal Monsoon Experiment (BOBMEX), a segment of the Indian Climate Research Programme (ICRP), in 1999; the details of his experiments are available in a number of articles published by the Indian Academy of Sciences. He has also delivered plenary and invited speeches including the talk on Air-sea interaction over the North Indian Ocean at Massachusetts Institute of Technology on 10 April 2012.

== Awards and honors ==
Bhat, who won the P. S. Narayan Medal and the Sabita Choudhuri Medal, both for the best doctoral thesis, in 1990, received the PRL Award for innovative theoretical and/or experimental studies in Earth and Planetary Sciences of the Physical Research Laboratory in 2001. The Council of Scientific and Industrial Research awarded him the Shanti Swarup Bhatnagar Prize, one of the highest Indian science awards in 2002. The Government of Karnataka awarded him the Prof. Satish Dhawan Young Engineer Award (Earth Sciences) in 2006 and he received the J. C. Bose Fellowship of the Department of Science ad Technology in 2010. He is also a member of the India Meteorological Society and Ocean Society of India and an elected fellow of the Indian Academy of Sciences (2006).

== Selected bibliography ==
- G. S. Bhat, S. Ameenulla (June 2000). "Surface meteorological instrumentation for BOBMEX". Proc. Indian Acad. Sci. (Earth Planet. Sci.). 109 (2). Indian Academy of Sciences: 221–227. Bibcode:2000InEPS.109..221B. doi:10.1007/BF02702195. S2CID 55342587.
- Bhat, G. S.; Vecchi, G. A.; Gadgil, S. (2004). "Sea surface temperature of the Bay of Bengal derived from the TRMM Microwave Imager" (PDF). Journal of Atmospheric and Oceanic Technology. 21 (8): 1283–1290. Bibcode:2004JAtOT..21.1283B. doi:10.1175/1520-0426(2004)021<1283:SSTOTB>2.0.CO;2.
- Bhat, G. S. (2006). "Near-surface temperature inversion over the Arabian Sea due to natural aerosols". Geophysical Research Letters. 33 (L02): L02802. Bibcode:2006GeoRL..33.2802B. doi:10.1029/2005GL024157.
- Srinivasa, Arun; Bhat, G. S.; Narasimha, Roddam (2007). "Dynamic eduction of coherent structures in turbulent jet flow imagery by wavelet techniques: part I". Journal of Turbulence. 8 (15): N15. Bibcode:2007JTurb...8...15S. doi:10.1080/14685240601175412.
- Alappattu, Denny P.; Bala Subrahamanyam, D.; Kunhikrishnan, P. K.; Somayaji, K. M.; Bhat, G. S.; Venkatesan, R.; Dutt, C. B. S.; Bagavath Singh, A.; Soni, V. K.; Tripathi, A. S. (2008). "On the marine atmospheric boundary layer characteristics over Bay of Bengal and Arabian Sea during the Integrated Campaign for Aerosols, gases and Radiation Budget (ICARB)" (PDF). Journal of Earth System Science. 117 (S1): 281–291. Bibcode:2008JESS..117..281A. doi:10.1007/s12040-008-0031-0. S2CID 53383274.

== See also ==
- Atmospheric convection
- Sankar Kumar Nath
