= Anurag Kumar =

Indian electrical engineer (born 1955)

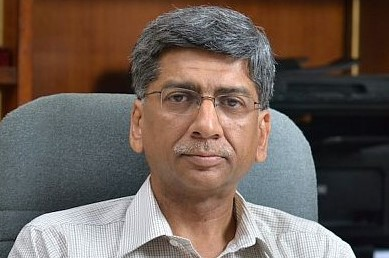
- Born: 13 July 1955 (age 71)
- Citizenship: Indian
- Education: Indian Institute of Technology Kanpur (BTech); Cornell University (PhD)
- Occupations: Professor, Department of Electrical Communication Engineering, Indian Institute of Science
- Awards: Co-winner of the CDAC-ACCS foundation award

Anurag Kumar was the Director of the Indian Institute of Science at Bangalore, India from 2014–2020. He is a professor at the Department of Electrical Communication Engineering, and has served as the Chairperson of the Electrical Sciences Division at the Indian Institute of Science, before being appointed as the Director in 2014.

== Education and career ==
Anurag Kumar obtained his BTech degree in Electrical Engineering from the Indian Institute of Technology at Kanpur in 1977, and was awarded the President of India's gold medal. He then obtained the PhD degree from Cornell University (1981), where he worked under the guidance of Prof. T.L. Fine. He was a Member of Technical Staff at AT&T Bell Labs, Holmdel, N.J., for over 6 years. During this period he worked on the performance analysis of computer systems, communication networks, and manufacturing systems.

His current research areas of interest include communication networks, cyber physical systems, distributed Systems: stochastic modelling, analysis, inference, optimisation, and control problems arising in such systems.

Since 1988 he has been with the Indian Institute of Science (IISc), Bangalore, in the Department of Electrical Communication Engineering (ECE). From 2000 to 2004 he was the Associate Chair of the ECE Department, from 2004 to 2007 he was the Chair of the ECE Department, and from 2007 to 2014 he was the Chair of Electrical Sciences Division. From 1989 to 2003, he was also the Coordinator at IISc of the nationwide Education and Research Network (ERNET) Project, which established the first country-wide packet communication network in India.

He has served as an Area Editor for IEEE Transactions on Networking, and for IEEE Communications Surveys and Tutorials.

== Awards and recognition ==
Prof. Kumar received the Institute of Electronics and Telecommunications Engineers (IETE) CDIL Best Paper Award (1993). He is a recipient of the COMSWARE 2008 Conference Best Paper Award, and also the IISc Alumni Award for Excellence in Engineering Research (2008).On 26 October 2009, Anurag Kumar was announced as a co-winner of the CDAC-ACCS Foundation Award for 2009 by the Advanced Computing and Communications Society.

He has been an elected Fellow of the Indian National Academy of Engineering since 1999 and an elected Fellow of the Indian National Science Academy since 2006. He is also a Fellow of Indian Academy of Sciences from 2010. As of 1 January 2006, Anurag Kumar is an elected Fellow of the Institute of Electrical and Electronics Engineers. for contributions to communication networks and distributed computing systems. He has been awarded the DST J.C. Bose National Fellowship for the period 2011–2021.
