= Shalabh Bhatnagar =

Indian professor and computer scientist

- Born: 1968 (age 57–58); India
- Education: University of Delhi; Indian Institute of Science
- Known for: Actor-critic algorithm, Stochastic Approximation
- Awards: J.C.Bose National Fellow (2020), IEEE Fellow (2025)
- Scientific career
- Fields: Computer Science, Reinforcement Learning, Stochastic Approximation, Optimization
- Workplaces: Indian Institute of Science
- Website: csa.iisc.ac.in/~shalabh/index.html

Shalabh Bhatnagar (born 1968) is an Indian professor of Computer Science and Automation at the Indian Institute of Science (IISc), Bangalore. He is the convenor of the Stochastic Systems Laboratory and an associate faculty member at the Robert Bosch Centre for Cyber‑Physical Systems at IISc. His research spans stochastic approximation, reinforcement learning, and simulation optimization, with applications in vehicular traffic control, smart grids, and communication networks.

== Education and career ==
Born in 1968, Bhatnagar earned his the Bachelors degree (Hons.) in physics from the University of Delhi, Delhi, India, in 1988. Masters and Ph.D. from the Indian Institute of Science in 1992 and 1998 respectively. He held postdoctoral positions at the Institute for Systems Research, University of Maryland, College Park, USA, during 1997 to 2000 and at the Vrije Universiteit, Amsterdam, Netherlands, during 2000-2001. He was subsequently a Visiting Faculty Member at IIT Delhi before joining IISc as an Assistant Professor in December 2001. Since 2011, Bhatnagar has served as Professor in the Department of Computer Science and Automation at IISc Bangalore.

== Research contributions ==
He leads the Stochastic Systems Laboratory, where his group develops reinforcement learning algorithms-particularly actor-critic and simulation‑based optimization methods-for complex stochastic systems. His group has applied these methods to vehicular traffic signal control and wireless network optimization.

Currently, he is serving as an Associate Editors at IEEE Control Systems Letters′ and Systems and Control Letters.

== Awards and honours ==
- Fellow, IEEE for contributions to stochastic recursive algorithms for optimization, control, and reinforcement learning (2025)
- Fellow, Asia-Pacific Artificial Intelligence Association (2023)
- J.C.Bose National Fellow (2020)
- Fellow, Indian National Science Academy (2018)
- Fellow, Indian National Academy of Engineering (2013)

== Selected Bibliography ==
=== Articles ===
- Bhatnagar, Shalabh; Sutton, Richard S.; Ghavamzadeh, Mohammad; Lee, Mark (November 2009). "Natural actor–critic algorithms". Automatica. 45 (11): 2471–2482. doi:10.1016/j.automatica.2009.07.008.
- La, Prashanth; Bhatnagar, Shalabh (June 2011). "Reinforcement Learning With Function Approximation for Traffic Signal Control". IEEE Transactions on Intelligent Transportation Systems. 12 (2): 412–421. Bibcode:2011ITITr..12..412P. doi:10.1109/TITS.2010.2091408.
- Maei, Hamid; Szepesvári, Csaba; Bhatnagar, Shalabh; Precup, Doina; Silver, David; Sutton, Richard S (2009). "Convergent Temporal-Difference Learning with Arbitrary Smooth Function Approximation". Advances in Neural Information Processing Systems. 22. Curran Associates, Inc.
- Maei, Hamid Reza; Szepesvári, Csaba; Bhatnagar, Shalabh; Sutton, Richard S. (21 June 2010). "Toward off-policy learning control with function approximation". Proceedings of the 27th International Conference on International Conference on Machine Learning. Omnipress: 719–726. ISBN 978-1-60558-907-7.
- Bhatnagar, Shalabh; Lakshmanan, K. (June 2012). "An Online Actor–Critic Algorithm with Function Approximation for Constrained Markov Decision Processes". Journal of Optimization Theory and Applications. 153 (3): 688–708. doi:10.1007/s10957-012-9989-5.
- Singla, Abhik; Padakandla, Sindhu; Bhatnagar, Shalabh (January 2021). "Memory-Based Deep Reinforcement Learning for Obstacle Avoidance in UAV With Limited Environment Knowledge". IEEE Transactions on Intelligent Transportation Systems. 22 (1): 107–118. arXiv:1811.03307. Bibcode:2021ITITr..22..107S. doi:10.1109/TITS.2019.2954952.

=== Books ===
- Bhatnagar, S.; Prasad, H. L.; Prashanth, L. A. (11 August 2012). Stochastic Recursive Algorithms for Optimization: Simultaneous Perturbation Methods. Springer. ISBN 978-1-4471-4285-0.

=== Patents ===
- Packet retransmission optimization in wireless network
- Approach for solving a constrained optimization problem
- Resource allocation in wireless communication network
