= H. V. Thulasiram =

Indian bioorganic chemist (born 1971)

- Born: 4 July 1971 (age 55); Tumkur, Karnataka, India
- Education: Bangalore University; Indian Institute of Science; University of Iowa; University of Utah
- Known for: Studies on Biosynthesis, biocatalysis and organic synthesis
- Awards: 2015 N-BIOS Prize
- Scientific career
- Fields: Bioorganic chemistry; Chemical Biology
- Workplaces: National Chemical Laboratory
- Doctoral advisor: K. Madhava Madyastha http://orgchem.iisc.ernet.in/faculty/kmm/kmm.html
- Doctoral students: Dr. Prabhakar Lal Srivastava, Dr. Pankaj Daramwar, Dr. (Mrs.) Swati Pramod Kolet, Dr. Saikat Haldar, Dr. Krithika Ramakrishnan, Dr. Dipesh Jadhav, Dr. Avinash Pandreka, Ms. T. Aarthy, Mr. Harshal S. Patil, Mr. Shrikant Jagannathrao Karegaonkar, Mr. Fayaj A. Mulani, Mr. Ashish R Kumar, Ms. Bhagyashree Popat Mane http://academic.ncl.res.in/hv.thulasiram/group-members

Hirekodathakallu Venkataramaiah Thulasiram is an Indian bioorganic chemist, chemical biologist, and a principal scientist at the National Chemical Laboratory of the Council of Scientific and Industrial Research. he is known for his studies in the fields of biocatalysis and organic synthesis, specifically on isoprenoid biosynthesis. The Department of Biotechnology of the Government of India awarded him the National Bioscience Award for Career Development, one of the highest Indian awards in science, for his contributions to biosciences, in 2015.

== Biography ==
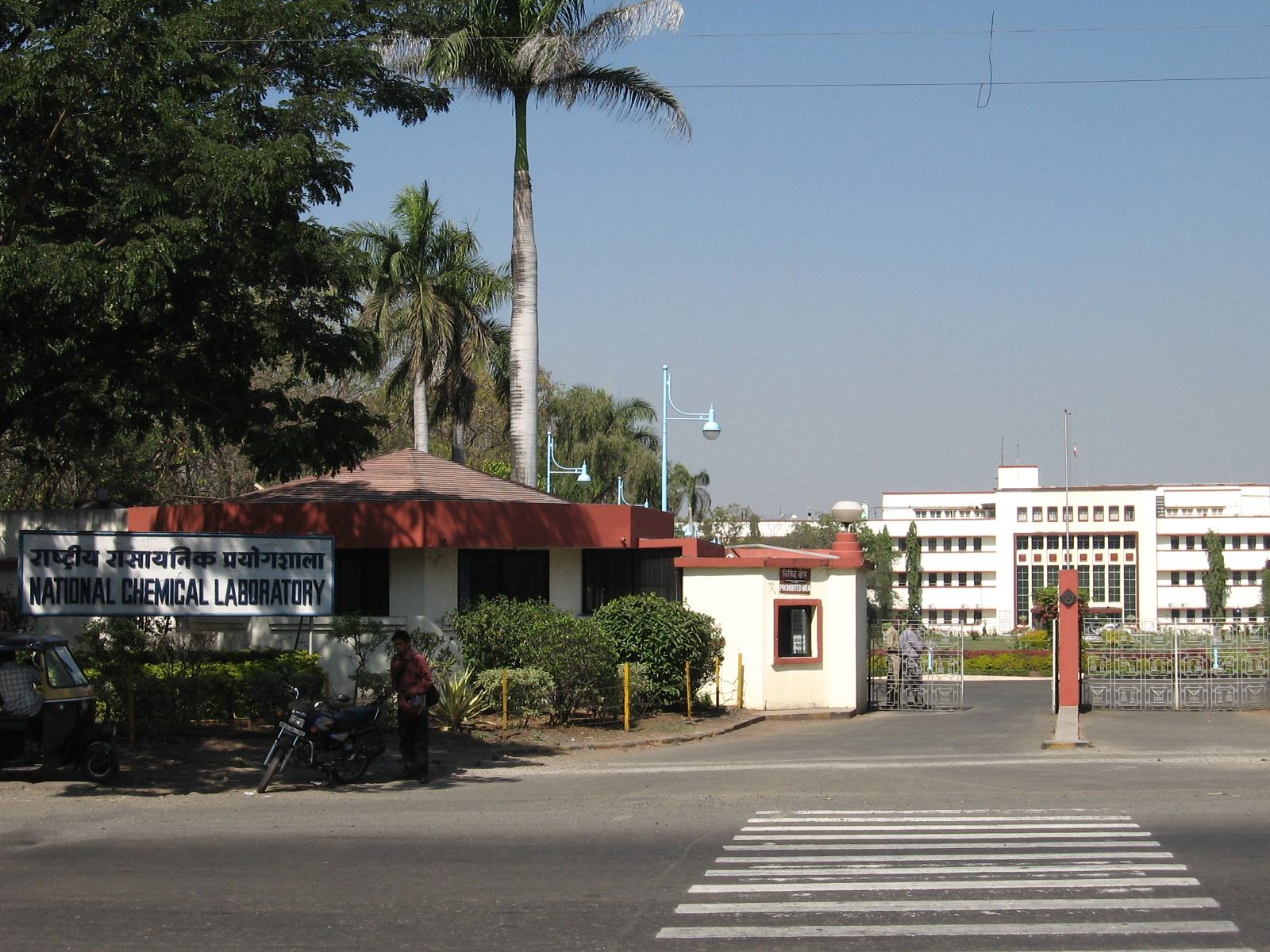
National Chemical Laboratory

H. V. Thulasiram, born in Hirekodathakallu, Tumkur Taluk and District of the south Indian state of Karnataka, completed his master's degree at Bangalore University in 1994 and joined the Indian Institute of Science for his doctoral studies which earned him a PhD in 2001. Subsequently, he proceeded to the US where he did his post-doctoral studies at the University of Iowa during 2000–03 and at the University of Utah from 2003 to 2006. On his return to India, he joined the National Chemical Laboratory, an autonomous research centre of the Council of Scientific and Industrial Research in 2008 as a scientist and serves as the principal scientist at the department of biochemistry.

Thulasiram focuses his research on biosynthesis and biocatalysis and is known to have carried out extensive studies of isoprenoid biosynthetic pathways. His studies have been documented by way of a number of articles (Note: Please see Selected bibliography section) and ResearchGate, an online repository of scientific articles has listed 73 of them. He holds two patents, Isolation and purification of shikimic acid from plant sources and Microbial chiral resolution of cyclic and acyclic acetates to enantiomerically pure (R)-alcohols.

== Awards and honors ==
The Department of Biotechnology (DBT) of the Government of India awarded him the National Bioscience Award for Career Development, one of the highest Indian science awards in 2015.

== Selected bibliography ==
- Patil, Harshal S.; Jadhav, Dipesh D.; Paul, Ajay; Mulani, Fayaj A.; Karegaonkar, Shrikant J.; Thulasiram, Hirekodathakallu V. (2018). "Lipase catalyzed synthesis of antimicrobial andrographolide derivatives". Data in Brief. 18: 1134–1141. Bibcode:2018DIB....18.1134P. doi:10.1016/j.dib.2018.03.103. PMC 5996720. PMID 29900286.
- Natarajan, Bhavani; Kalsi, Harpreet S; Godbole, Prajakta; Malankar, Nilam; Thiagarayaselvam, Aarthy; Siddappa, Sundaresha; Thulasiram, Hirekodathakallu V; Chakrabarti, Swarup K; Banerjee, Anjan K (30 January 2018). "MiRNA160 is associated with local defense and systemic acquired resistance against Phytophthora infestans infection in potato". Journal of Experimental Botany. 69 (8): 2023–2036. doi:10.1093/jxb/ery025. PMC 6018911. PMID 29390146.
- Patil, Harshal S.; Jadhav, Dipesh D.; Paul, Ajay; Mulani, Fayaj A.; Karegaonkar, Shrikant J.; Thulasiram, Hirekodathakallu V. (2018). "Regioselective and efficient enzymatic synthesis of antimicrobial andrographolide derivatives". Bioorganic & Medicinal Chemistry Letters. 28 (6): 1132–1137. doi:10.1016/j.bmcl.2018.01.007. PMID 29475585.

== See also ==
- Mevalonate pathway
- Shikimic acid
