= Devadas Devaprabhakara =

Indian organic chemist and a professor

- Born: 13 November 1932; India
- Died: 12 January 1978
- Known for: Studies on cyclic allenes and medium-ring dines
- Awards: 1976 Shanti Swarup Bhatnagar Prize
- Scientific career
- Fields: Organic chemistry
- Institutions: Indian Institute of Science

Devadas Devaprabhakara (13 November 1932 – 12 January 1978) was an Indian organic chemist and a professor at the department of chemistry of the Indian Institute of Science. He was known for his studies on cyclic allenes and medium-ring dines. His researches on the reduction, hydroporation and isomerization of them and his synthesis of a number of cyclic hydrocarbons have assisted in rationalizing the understanding of the substrates. He published his researches by way of several peer-reviewed articles; the inline repository of the Indian Academy of Sciences have listed 48 of them. He was also an elected fellow of the Indian Academy of Sciences. The Council of Scientific and Industrial Research, the apex agency of the Government of India for scientific research, awarded him the Shanti Swarup Bhatnagar Prize for Science and Technology, one of the highest Indian science awards, in 1976, for his contributions to chemical sciences. He died on 12 January 1978, at the age of 45.

== See also ==
- Cyclic hydrocarbons
