= Indian Institute of Science =

Public university in Bengaluru, India

- Official seal of IISc
- Type: Public research university
- Established: c. 1909; 117 years ago
- Founder: Jamsetji Tata Krishnaraja Wadiyar IV
- Accreditation: NAAC
- Affiliations: ACU; UGC; AIU; MISA
- Budget: ₹1,470.70 crore (US$160 million) (2024–2025)
- President: N. Chandrasekaran
- Director: Govindan Rangarajan
- Visitor: President of India
- Academic staff: 481
- Administrative staff: 214
- Students: 5,286
- Undergraduates: 533
- Postgraduates: 2,010
- Doctoral students: 2,743
- Location: Bengaluru, Karnataka, 560012, India
- Campus: 440 acres (180 ha); Urban
- Website: www.iisc.ac.in

The Indian Institute of Science (IISc) is a public deemed research university for higher education and research in science, engineering, design, and management. It is located in Bengaluru, Karnataka. The institute was established in 1909 with active support from Jamsetji Tata and thus is also locally known as the Tata Institute. It was granted a deemed university status in 1958 and recognized as an Institute of Eminence in 2018.

The Indian Institute of Science is widely regarded as one of India's most prestigious and selective institutions for higher education and research. It has consistently been ranked among the country's top universities and research institutions by national and international rankings.

== History ==
=== Foundations and early history ===
Directors
| M. W. Travers | FRS, 1909–1914 |
| Sir A.G. Bourne | FRS, 1915–1921 |
| Sir Martin O. Forster | FRS, 1922–1933 |
| Sir C.V. Raman | FRS, 1933–1937 |
| Sir J.C. Ghosh | 1939–1948 |
| M. S. Thacker | 1949–1955 |
| S. Bhagavantam | 1957–1962 |
| S. Dhawan | 1962–1981 |
| S. Ramaseshan | 1981–1984 |
| C.N.R. Rao | FRS, 1984–1994 |
| G. Padmanaban | 1994–1998 |
| Goverdhan Mehta | FRS 1998–2005 |
| P. Balaram | 2005–2014 |
| Anurag Kumar | 2014–2020 |
| Govindan Rangarajan | 2020– |

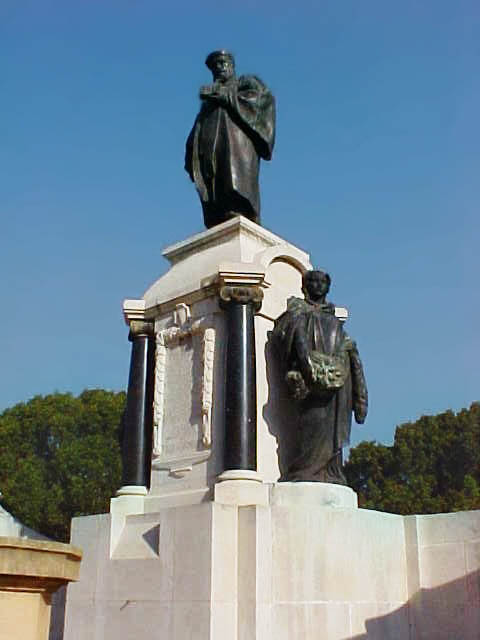
Statue of Jamsetji Tata, founder of Indian Institute of Science, in 2002

After an accidental meeting between Jamsetji Tata and Swami Vivekananda, on a ship in 1893 where they discussed Tata's plan of bringing the steel industry to India, Tata wrote to Vivekananda five years later: "I trust, you remember me as a fellow-traveller on your voyage from Japan to Chicago. I very much recall at this moment your views on the growth of the ascetic spirit in India... I recall these ideas in connection with my scheme of Research Institute of Science for India, of which you have doubtless heard or read." Tata was interested in education and development of skills for industrial projects such as steel making. He sent his associate Burjorji Padshah on a world tour in 1896 to examine research institutions so as to have an "Indian University of Research". Padshah then produced a guiding document An Institute of Scientific Research for India (1898).

Impressed by Vivekananda's views on science and leadership abilities, Tata wanted him to guide his campaign. Vivekananda endorsed the project with enthusiasm, and Tata, with the aim of advancing the scientific capabilities of the country, constituted a provisional committee to prepare a plan for setting up of an institute of research and higher education. The committee presented a draft proposal to Viceroy George Curzon on 31 December 1898. Subsequently, Sir William Ramsay, a Nobel Laureate, was called on to propose a suitable place for such an institution who suggested Bangalore as the best location.

The land and other facilities for the institution were donated by Maharaja Krishnaraja Wadiyar IV and Tata. The maharaja donated about 371 acres (150 ha) of land; Tata gave several buildings towards the creation of IISc. This land included the former village of Medaraninganahalli. A Kannada inscription dated to 1669 CE records the donation of Medaraninganahalli to the Mallapura Mallikarjuna temple by the Maratha king Ekoji I. The maharaja also granted Rs 5,00,000 towards capital expenditure and Rs 50,000 for annual expense. Nizam Osman Ali Khan also contributed, which amounted to around Rs 300,000 over a period of 31 years.

The constitution of the institute was approved by Viceroy Gilbert Elliot-Murray-Kynynmound, and the necessary "vesting order" to enable it to function was signed on 27 May 1909. Early in 1911, the maharaja laid the foundation stone of the institute, and on 24 July, the first batch of students were admitted to the Departments of General and Applied Chemistry under Norman Rudolf and Electro-Technology under Alfred Hay. Within two months, the Department of Organic Chemistry was opened. In 1958, the institute was deemed a university by the University Grants Commission of India.

At the time of the inception of IISc in 1909, Morris Travers, Sir William Ramsay's co-worker in the discovery of the noble gases, became its first director. For Travers, this was a natural continuation of his work on the institute, since he had played a role in its founding. The first Indian director was the Nobel Laureate Sir C.V. Raman.

The institute was the first to introduce a master's programs in engineering. It has also started integrated doctoral programmes in biological, chemical, physical, and mathematical sciences for natural science graduates.

=== Recent history ===
On 28 December 2005, two terrorists started firing indiscriminately inside the IISc campus. Munish Chander Puri, a professor from IIT Delhi, died in the attack. Four others were injured.

In 2018, the IISc was one of the first six institutes to be awarded the Institute of Eminence status. In 2019, the IISc launched its brand statement: "Discover and Innovate; Transform and Transcend; Serve and Lead".

In 2022, the IISc received a private donation of 425 crore Indian Rupees, the largest in its history, to establish a postgraduate medical institute.

== Campus ==
The institute's Main Campus is fully residential and is spread over 400 acres of land in the heart of Bengaluru. It is located in the north of Bengaluru, about 6 kilometres from Bengaluru City railway station and Kempegowda Bus Station, on the way to Yeshwantpur. It is connected with city's Namma Metro Sandal Soap Factory metro station and by various bus stations of Bengaluru Metropolitan Transport Corporation. The institute is about 30 kilometres southwest of Kempegowda International Airport. As a research hub, it is in the vicinity of a number of other research institutes, Raman Research Institute, Indian Space Research Organisation (ISRO), Wood Research Institute and Central Power Research Institute (CPRI), are close to IISc. Most of these institutes are connected to IISc by a regular shuttle bus service.

The main campus houses more than 40 departments marked by routes such as the Gulmohar Marga, the Mahogany Marga, the Badami Marga, the Tala Marga, the Ashoka Marga, the Nilgiri Marg, the Silver Oak Marg, the Amra Marga and the Arjuna Marga. The campus features six canteens (cafeterias), a gymkhana (gymnasium and sports complex), a football ground and a cricket ground, five dining messes (halls), one multi cuisine restaurant, eighteen men's and five women's hostels (dormitories), an air strip, a library, two shopping centers and residences of the faculty members and other staff, besides other amenities.

The IISc campus harbours both exotic and indigenous plant species with about 110 species of woody plants. The roads on the campus are named after the dominant avenue tree species.

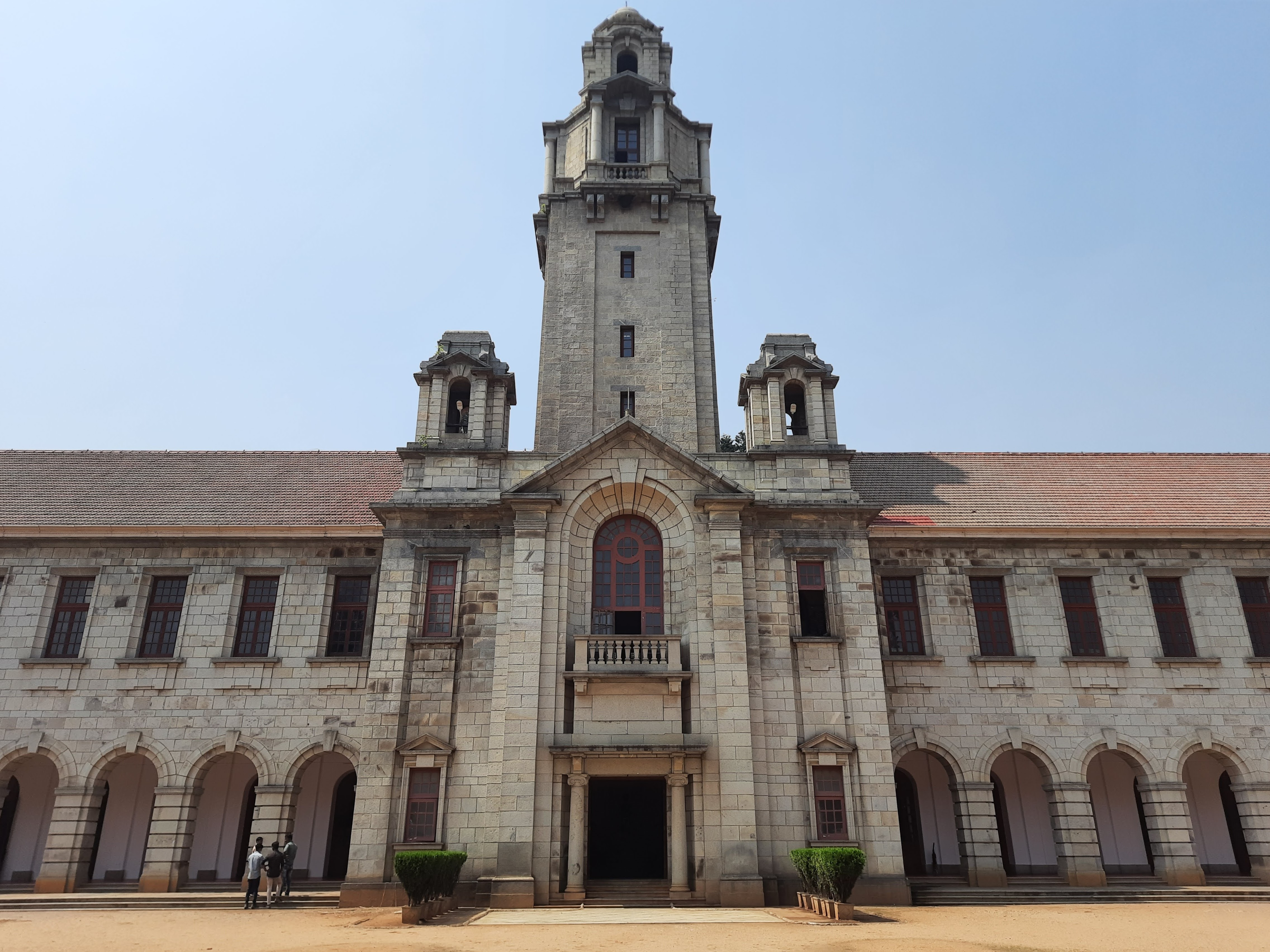
One of the oldest buildings of IISc, in 2022

The architecture of the Main Building, which today houses the administration and the Faculty Hall, is classical in style, fronted by a grey, handsome tower. In front of it stands the work of Gilbert Bayes, a monument erected in the memory of J. N. Tata. At its feet is an inscription that serves to remind future generations of the generosity of Jamsetji Tata and the persistence with which he worked for the welfare of India. The building, as one of the prominent landmarks of Bangalore, was designed by C. F. Stevens and Company of Bombay in 1912–13.

=== J. R. D. Tata Memorial Library ===
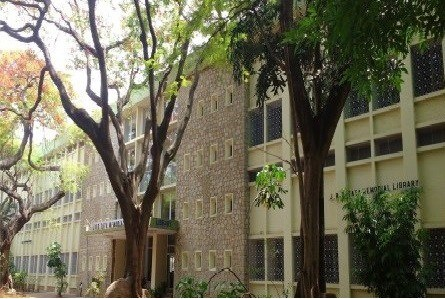
The main library of Indian Institute of Science, in 2016

J. R. D. Tata Memorial Library is the main library of IISc. Apart from the main library, the institute also has independent departmental libraries. The library moved into the present premises in January 1965, built out of grants provided by University Grants Commission (UGC), in commemoration of the golden jubilee celebrations of the institute in 1959. In 1995, the library was renamed as "J. R. D. Tata Memorial Library". The National Board for Higher Mathematics (NBHM) has recognised this library as Regional Center for Mathematics for the south region and continued to award a special grant towards subscription of Journals in Mathematics.

The annual budget of the library is over Rs. 100 million (almost US$2,500,000) of which subscription towards periodicals alone is about Rs. 90 million. The library currently receives over 1,734 periodical titles, of which 1381 are subscribed, while the remaining titles are received gratis or on an exchange basis. About 600 titles are accessible through the library subscription. In addition, over 10,000 journals are accessible online, thanks to INDEST subscription. The total holdings of the library exceed 411,000 documents. The buildings for the metallurgy and aerospace departments were designed by the German architect Otto Königsberger in 1940.

=== Historical artifacts on campus ===
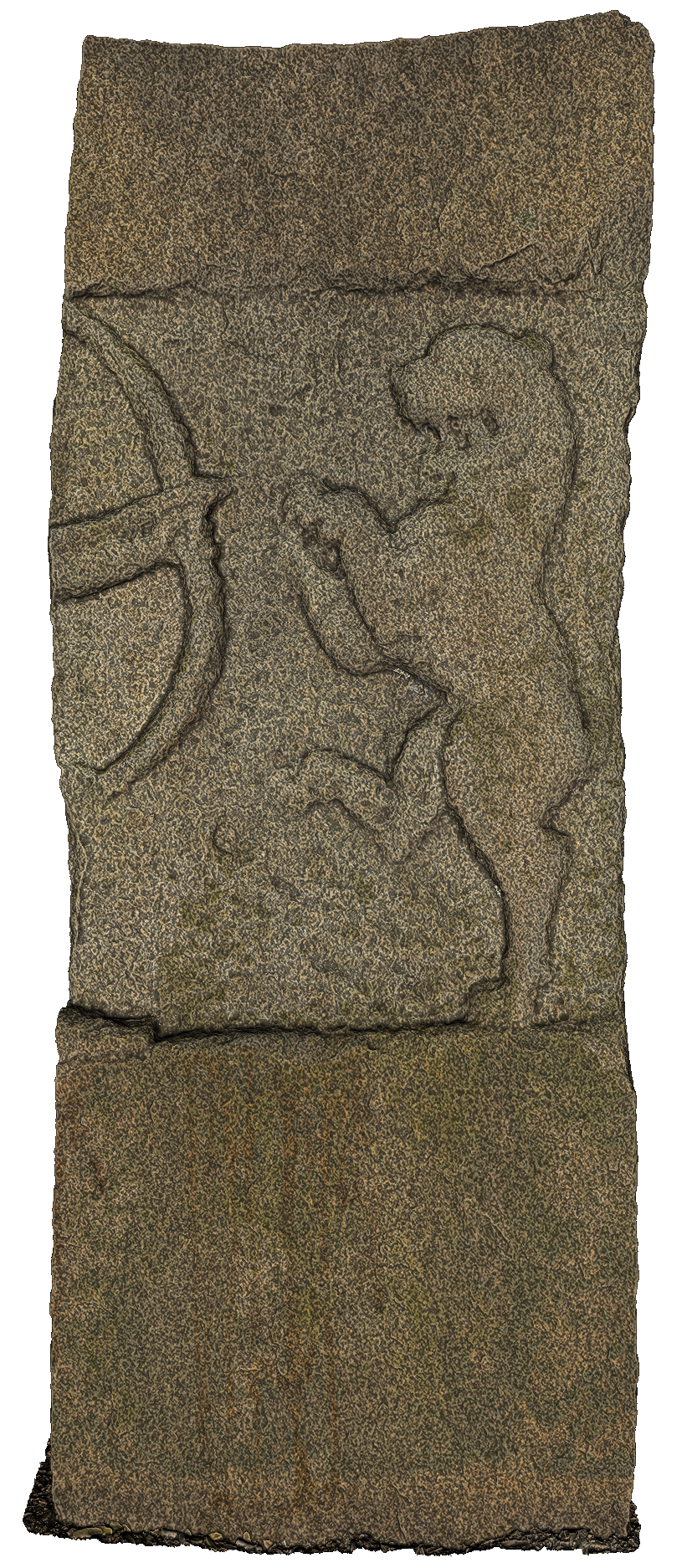
Digital image of the Tiger Hunting Hero stone

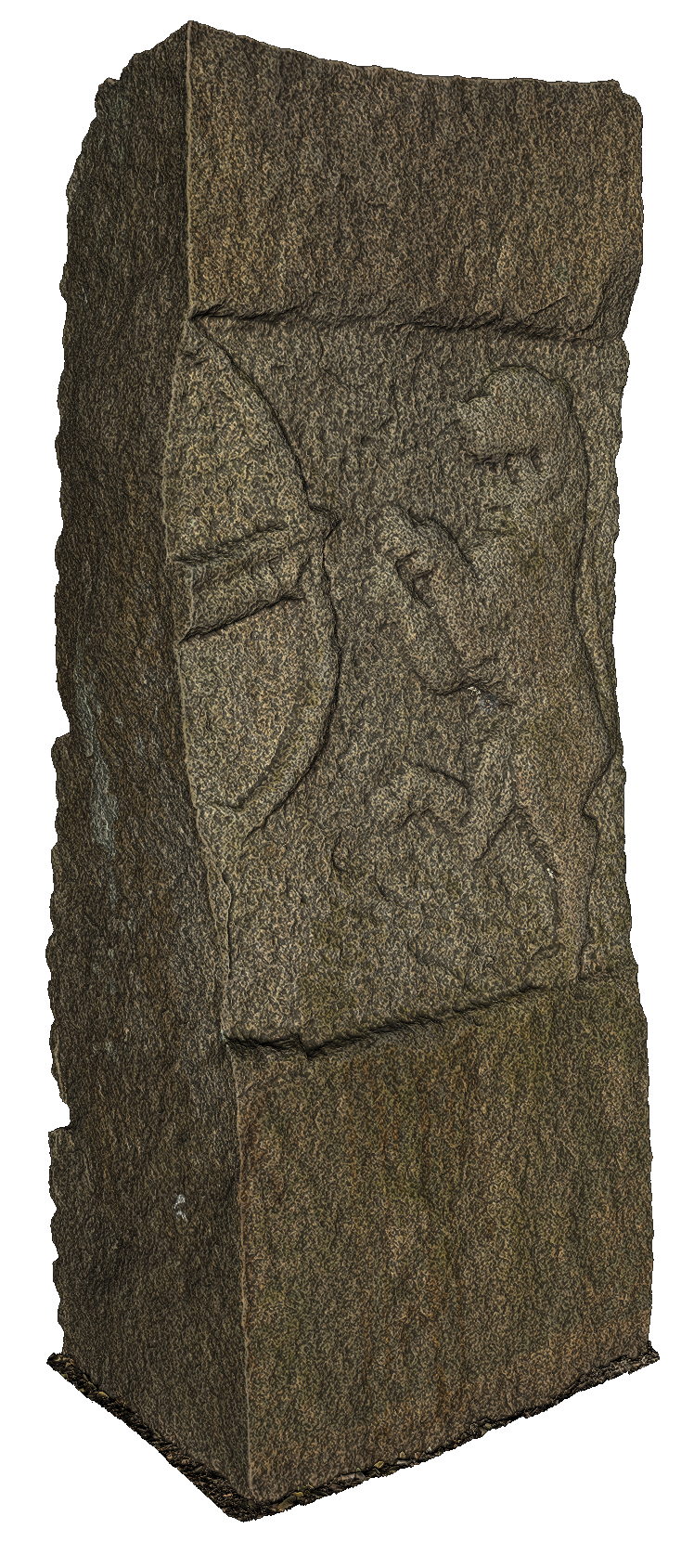
Digital image of the Tiger Hunting Hero stone (second portion)

A 10th century hulibete veeragallu, or hero stone commemorating a fight with a tiger, was discovered on the IISc campus in the late 1970s by two children of a professor who lived there. Veeragallus were typically erected to honor individuals who died in acts of valor, usually civilians. They are found mostly in the Karnataka region, dating from the 8th to 17th centuries. Those with inscriptions are especially helpful to historians as they provide more context about the event and martyr.

While the IISc veeragallu lacks an inscription, experts believe it dates to the 10th century when the Western Gangas ruled Bangalore. The sculpture is partially damaged, but you can still see the martyr's left hand gripping a bow and his right hand about to shoot an arrow at an attacking tiger.

This is one of only three known hulibete veeragallus in Bangalore. The others are located at Bangalore University (7th or 8th century) and in Madivala (14th century).

=== Challakere campus ===
A second campus was established in Challakere, on a 1,500 acres (6.1 km^{2}) lot of land. Research centres and labs here include the Talent Development Centre, Skill Development Centre funded by the Hindustan Aeronautics Limited, Solar Power Research Center and a Climate Observatory. The Centre for Sustainable Technologies has commenced its activities through the Centre for Bio-energy and Low-Carbon Technologies (C-BELT).

Janardhana Swamy, then Member of Parliament and an alumnus of IISc and Amalan Biswas, then District Magistrate of Chitradurga district played significant roles in setting up the IISc's new campus at Challakere.

== Organisation and administration ==
=== Academic divisions, departments, and centres ===
For academic purposes, departments and centres in the institute are broadly assigned to either the Science Faculty or the Engineering Faculty. For administrative purposes (such as faculty recruitment, assessment and promotion), departments and centres are classified into six divisions, each headed by a Dean. Each department or centre is administered by a chairperson.

| Division | Departments, Centres, and Units |
|---|---|
| Biological Sciences | Department of Biochemistry; Central Animal Facility; Centre for Ecological Sciences; Centre for Infectious Disease Research; Centre for Neuroscience; Department of Microbiology and Cell Biology; Molecular Biophysics Unit; Department of Molecular Reproduction, Development and Genetics |
| Chemical Sciences | Department of Inorganic and Physical Chemistry; Materials Research Centre; Department of Organic Chemistry; Solid State and Structural Chemistry Unit |
| Physical and Mathematical Sciences | Astronomy and Astrophysics Programme; Centre for Cryogenic Technology; Centre for High Energy Physics; Department of Instrumentation and Applied Physics; Department of Mathematics; Department of Physics |
| Electrical, Electronic, and Computer Sciences | Department of Computer Science and Automation; Department of Electrical Communication Engineering; Department of Electrical Engineering; Department of Electronic Systems Engineering |
| Mechanical Sciences | Department of Aerospace Engineering; Centre for Atmospheric and Oceanic Sciences; Centre for Earth Sciences; Department of Design and Manufacturing; Centre for Sustainable Technologies; Department of Chemical Engineering; Department of Civil Engineering; Divecha Centre for Climate Change; Department of Materials Engineering; Department of Mechanical Engineering |
| Interdisciplinary Research | Centre for Infrastructure, Sustainable Transportation and Urban Planning; Centre for Biosystems Science and Engineering; Centre for Contemporary Studies; Centre for Nano Science and Engineering; Department of Computational and Data Sciences; Department of Management Studies; Interdisciplinary Centre for Energy Research; Interdisciplinary Centre for Water Research; Interdisciplinary Mathematical Science; Robert Bosch Centre for Cyber Physical Systems; Supercomputer Education and Research Centre |

The following centres are directly under the director (without a divisional chairman):

- Archives and Publication Cell
- Centre for Continuing Education
- Center for Counseling and Support
- Centre for Scientific & Industrial Consultancy
- Centre for Sponsored Schemes and Projects
- Digital Campus and IT Services Office
- J. R. D. Tata Memorial Library
- Office of Communications
- Office of Development and Alumni Affairs
- Office of Research Grants
- Office of Intellectual Property and Technology Licensing
- Office of International Relations
- Skill Development Centre
- Talent Development Centre

Autonomous Societies and Centres based in the Institute:

- Advanced Bioresidue Energy Technologies Society
- Centre for Brain Research
- Foundation for Science Innovation and Development

== Academics ==
=== Academic programs ===
==== Post-graduate research programs ====
Research students constitute more than 60 % of the students on the campus. PhD degrees offered in 40 different disciplines. Research programs leading to doctoral degrees are the main thrust in many departments. The program has a limited amount of course work, essentially to prepare the student to carry out the research, but the main emphasis is on the thesis work. The annual intake of research students is approximately 575 with several candidates sponsored from educational institutions and industries (through External Registration Program).

The Integrated PhD program is designed to offer opportunities to 3-year BSc graduates for pursuing advanced research in areas of biological, chemical, mathematical, and physical Sciences, leading to the PhD degree. In 2024, IISc launched new short courses on Computational Structural Reliability.

==== Post-graduate coursework programs ====
The two-year M.Tech. program is available in almost all engineering departments. Most MTech programs have a set of hard core courses specified as an essential requirement whereas students can take rest of the credits from many courses available in their parent or other departments and also do a dissertation work on the topic of their choice.

Master's degrees offered by the institute are classified into two categories: degrees by coursework (M.Tech., M.Mgt., and M.Des.) and degrees by research (M.Tech. research).

The Department of Management Studies offers a Master of Management program exclusively for engineering graduates. The Center for Product Design and Manufacturing offers the Master of Design (M.Des.) course. Started in 1996, the M.Des. program is a two-year, full-time postgraduate program.

In 2022, cooperating with the National Education Policy (NEP 2020), IISc launched an online Master of Technology program, for practicing engineers and scientists. The program was designated for engineering professionals who are sponsored by organisations, for upskilling in the disciplines of Data Science and Business Analytics, Artificial Intelligence, and Electronics and Communication Engineering.

Since 2022, the institute has launched a standalone Master of Science program in the life sciences, physical and chemical sciences. These two year programs consist of foundational coursework and flexible electives with an emphasis on laboratory training to develop research skills culminating in a thesis research project.

==== Undergraduate program ====
An undergraduate program in science for students after Class XII was started during the Centenary Celebrations in 2009. The first batch of students was admitted in 2011. It is a four-year Bachelor of Science (Research) program offered in six subjects: Biology, Chemistry, Environmental Science, Material Science, Mathematics, and Physics. It is a unique undergraduate course that paved the way for similar four-year multidisciplinary science program models to be adopted at other institutions and set a precedent that influenced national frameworks like the NEP 2020. The course aims at exposing the students to the inter-disciplinary nature in which scientific research is done in many upcoming fields.

Since 2023, IISc has introduced various undergraduate B.Tech programs in various disciplines starting with Mathematics and Computing. In 2026, the institute launched B.Tech in two additional disciplines, aerospace engineering, and material science and engineering

Admission to the undergraduate programs is through one of two channels: The JEE Advanced (for the engineering programs) and the IISER Aptitute Test (for the BS prorgrams).

=== Central computing facility ===
The Computer Centre, established in 1970 as a central computing facility, became Supercomputer Education and Research Centre (SERC) in 1990 to provide computing facility to the faculty and students of the institute. SERC was created and fully funded by the Ministry of Human Resource Development (MHRD), Government of India to commemorate the platinum jubilee of the institute. It houses India's first petascale supercomputer Cray XC40, the erstwhile fastest supercomputer in India.

Apart from functioning as a central computing facility of IISc, the SERC is engaged in education and research programs in areas relating to supercomputer development and application. The centre is also involved in several sponsored research projects in collaboration with several government and private agencies.

=== Academic and industrial collaborations ===
The Indian Institute of Science collaborates with various government organisations like the Indian Ordnance Factories, Defence Research and Development Organisation, the Indian Space Research Organisation, Bharat Electronics Limited, Aeronautical Development Agency, National Aerospace Laboratories, CSIR, and the Centre for Development of Advanced Computing. IISc also works in collaboration with private industry and research labs.

Through the Society of Innovation and Development (SID), various startups and organisations were incubated on campus including Morphing Machines, SandI and Gamma Porite. IISc actively promotes and supports ventures by the faculty, the students and alumni. Strand Life Sciences and Ittiam are some success stories of this initiative. In March 2016, a start-up incubated at the IISc built the world's first food-grade DNA/RNA stain. This might cut the time taken to diagnose conditions such as HIV to a day, from 45 days at present. An Artificial Intelligence and Robotics Technology Park (ARTPARK) with a seed money of Rs 230 crore was launched at the IISc campus.

=== Rankings ===
University rankings

Global – Overall
- QS World: 221 (2027)
- THE World: 201-250 (2026)

Global – Science and engineering
- QS Engineering & Tech.: 129 (2026)
- QS Natural Sciences: 125 (2026)
- THE Computer Science: 96 (2026)
- THE Engineering: 101-125 (2026)

Regional – Overall
- QS Asia: 64 (2026)
- THE Asia: 43 (2026)

University and Institute rankings

General – India
- NIRF (Overall) (2024): 2
- NIRF (Research) (2024): 1
- NIRF (Universities) (2024): 1

Internationally, IISc was ranked 211th in the world by the QS World University Rankings of 2025 and 58th in Asia in the QS World University Rankings of 2024. It was ranked 201–250 in the world and 32 in Asia by the Times Higher Education World University Rankings in 2024. In addition, it was ranked 18 among emerging economies universities by the Times Higher Education World University Rankings in 2022. It was ranked 401–500 in the world in 2024 by the Academic Ranking of World Universities.

In India, IISc was also ranked 2nd in the overall category, 1st among research institutions, and 1st among universities by the National Institutional Ranking Framework (NIRF) in 2024.

In India, IISc has secured the second position in the NIRF overall category for 2025.

In QS World University Rankings: Asia 2026, IISc ranked at 64th position.

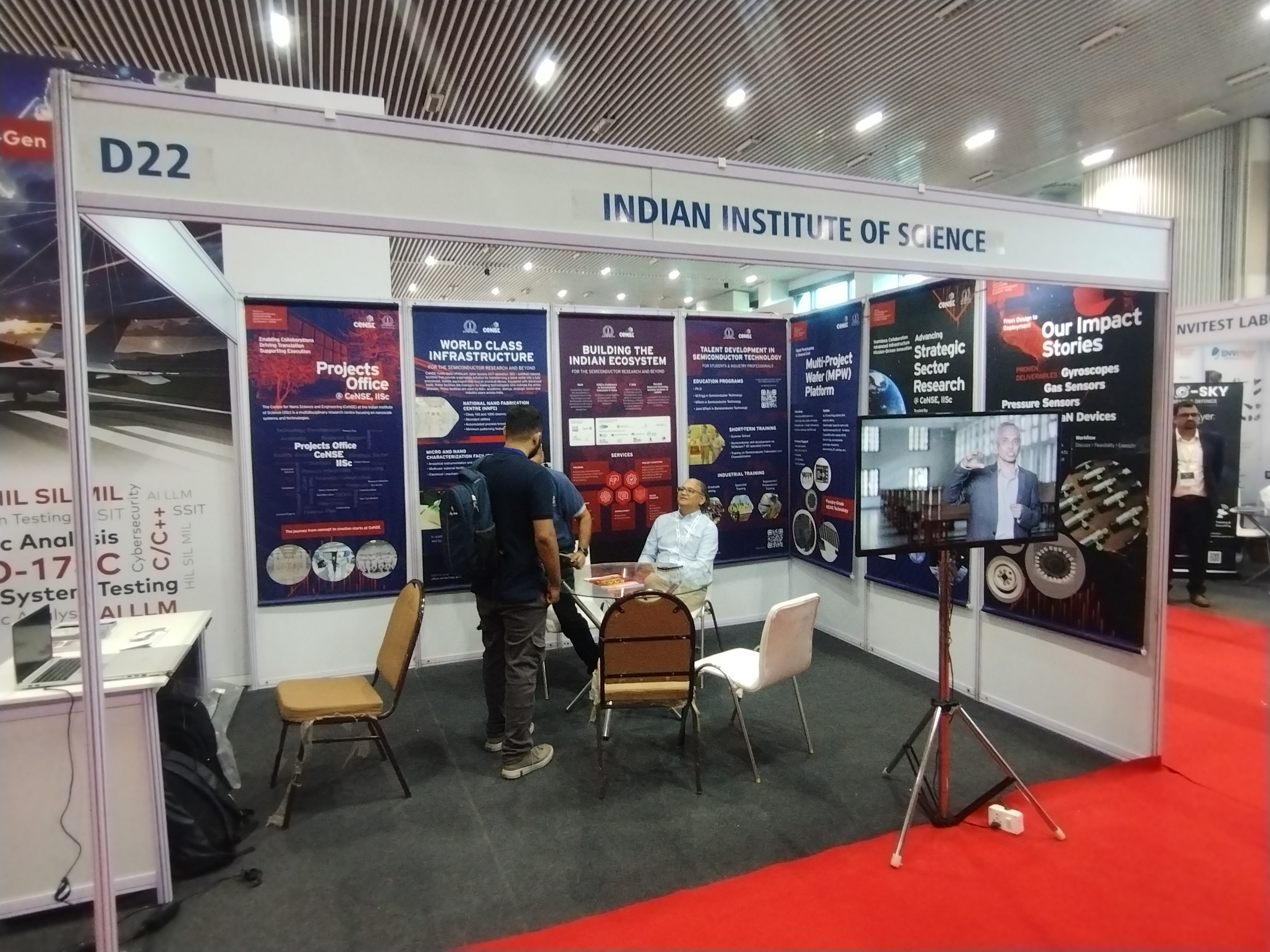
IISc at DEF-TECH Bharat 2026, KTPO, Bengaluru

== Campus life ==
=== Events ===
Pravega is the annual science, technology and cultural festival of Indian Institute of Science, Bangalore. Started in 2013 by the undergraduates of IISc, the fest is usually held on the third weekend of January.Vijyoshi, an annual national science camp for secondary school and undergraduate students, is hosted by IISc.

IISc Open Day is held every year on first Saturday of March to commemorate the birth anniversary of its founder Jamsetji Tata. It is open to general public and visitors get to explore the institute, witness scientific exhibitions & experiments, interact with leading scientists.

IISc also has active sports teams, major ones being in cricket, football, badminton and volleyball. They participate each year in the IISM (inter IISER sports meet) and a number of other tournaments and events.

=== Alumni associations ===
IISc has a parent alumni association (AA) in Bangalore and several branches elsewhere including USA (IISCAANA). Of recent parent association is involved in several disputes. One of the reasons appears to be efforts by some to allow Non-IISc degree holders to become a part of the AA. Similar situation is created in IISCAANA by allowing several non-IISc members to be active in the team. IISCAANA allows those who did not complete degree to become members by adding a clause completed at least one semester of course work in IISc' for membership eligibility.

=== Music Club ===
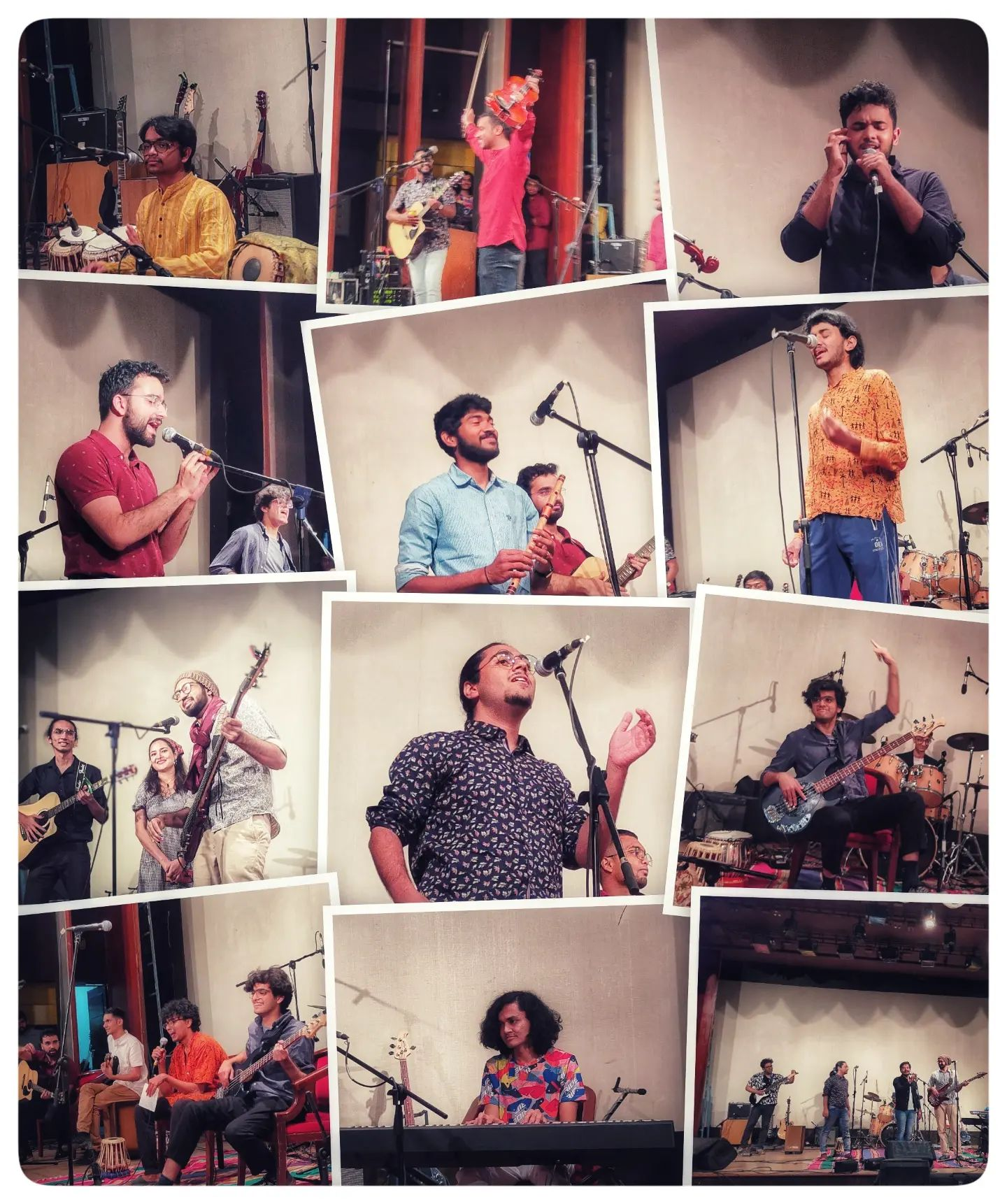
Rhythmica musicians performing for their annual Founders day Show in March 2022.

Rhythmica is the oldest active music club of IISc. Rhythmica members are students of IISc as well as professors.

IISc also hosts a local branch of the Society for the Promotion of Indian Classical Music and Culture Amongst Youth (SPIC MACAY) that was started around 1984.

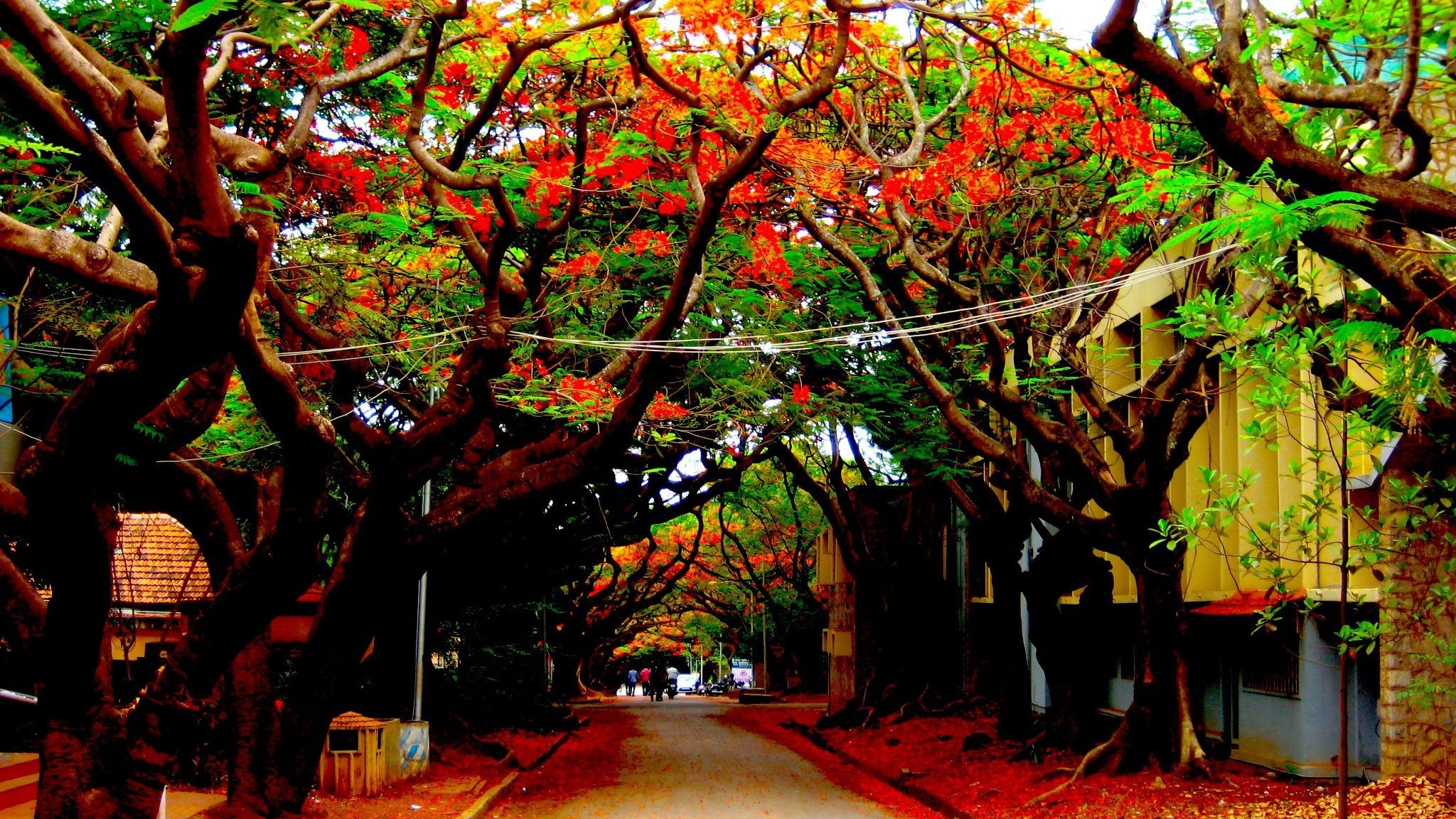
Gulmohar Marg, IISc campus, in 2020

== Notable people ==
=== Notable alumni ===
- V. K. Aatre
- Anuranjan Anand
- Ram Narain Agarwal
- Prathima Agrawal
- Vishwani Agrawal
- Ashok Agrawala
- Narendra Ahuja
- Maruthi Akella
- T. K. Alex
- Satya N. Atluri
- Narayanaswamy Balakrishnan
- Siva S. Banda
- Sasanka Chandra Bhattacharyya
- Tavarekere Kalliah Chandrashekar
- Vadapalli Chandrasekhar
- Dipankar Chatterji
- Rajagopala Chidambaram
- Sanjeev Das
- H. G. Dattatreya
- Sukh Dev
- Sanjeev Galande
- S. Ganesh
- N. Gautham
- Rajesh Sudhir Gokhale
- Kunchithapadam Gopalan
- Prashant Goswami
- G. Guruswamy
- Kota Harinarayana
- Rangachar Narayana Iyengar
- A. M. Jayannavar
- Sachidananda Kangovi
- Ritu Karidhal
- P. K. Kelkar
- Mohammad Islam Khan
- A. S. Kiran Kumar
- Tapas Kumar Kundu
- Pinaki Majumdar
- Debasisa Mohanty
- Saraju Mohanty
- Jarugu Narasimha Moorthy
- M. R. N. Murthy
- Budaraju Srinivasa Murty
- Sudha Murty
- Ramakrishnan Nagaraj
- Satish Nagarajaiah
- Ganesh Nagaraju
- Prasanth Nair
- Vinay K. Nandicoori
- P. T. Narasimhan
- Shamkant Navathe
- Sethuraman Panchanathan
- Swapan Kumar Pati
- Aloke Paul
- Beena Pillai
- Thalappil Pradeep
- Balaji Prakash
- Venkatraman Radhakrishnan
- Ram Rajasekharan
- Madan Rao
- Gundabathula Venkateswara Rao
- D. Srinivasa Reddy
- Rajendra Prasad Roy
- R. Sankararamakrishnan
- V. K. Saraswat
- Sagar Sengupta
- Shubhanshu Shukla
- K. Sivan
- R. Sowdhamini
- K. R. Sreenivasan
- Sargur Srihari
- Narayanaswamy Srinivasan
- S. Somanath
- Janardhana Swamy
- H. V. Thulasiram
- Sitaram Rao Valluri
- M. Vijayan
- P. N. Vinayachandran
- Rajindar Pal Wadhwa

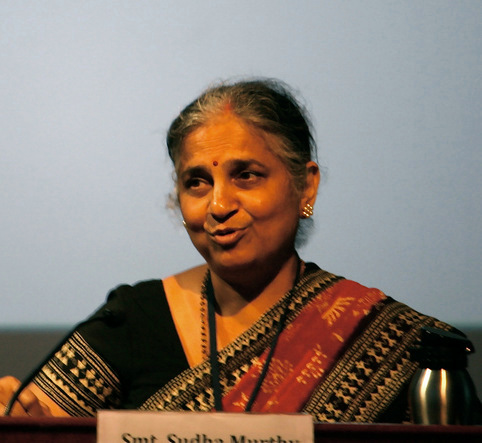
Sudha Murthy, Chairman of Infosys Foundation

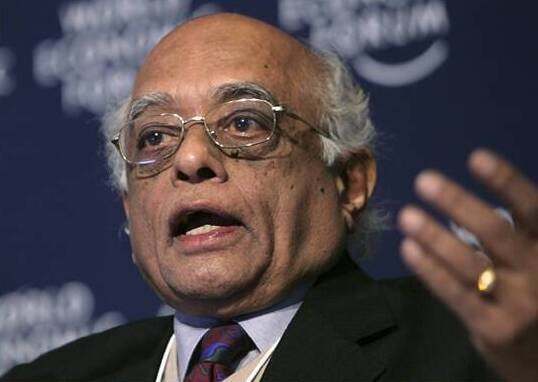
R Chidambaram, Principal Scientific Adviser to the Government of India

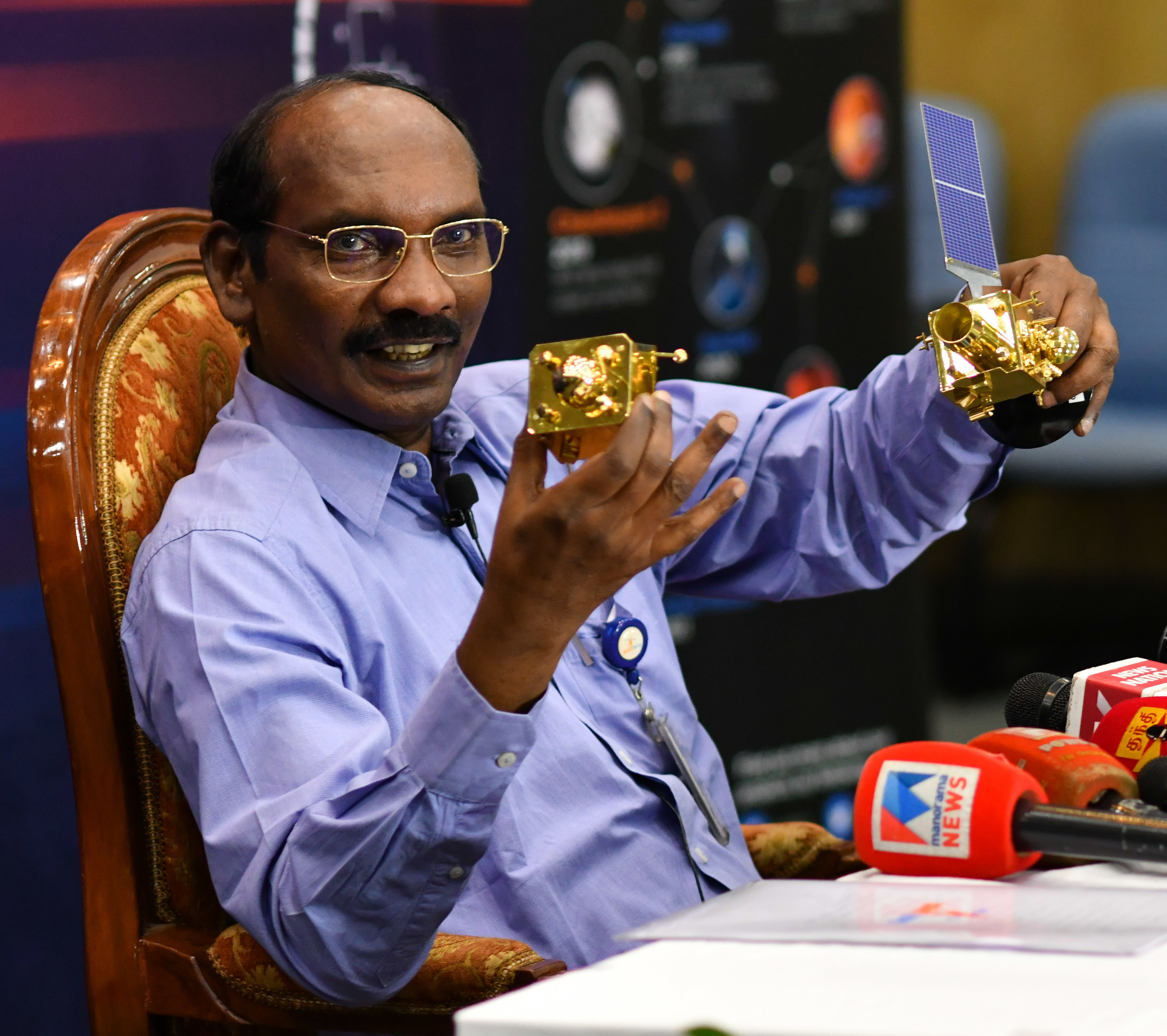
K. Sivan Chairman of ISRO

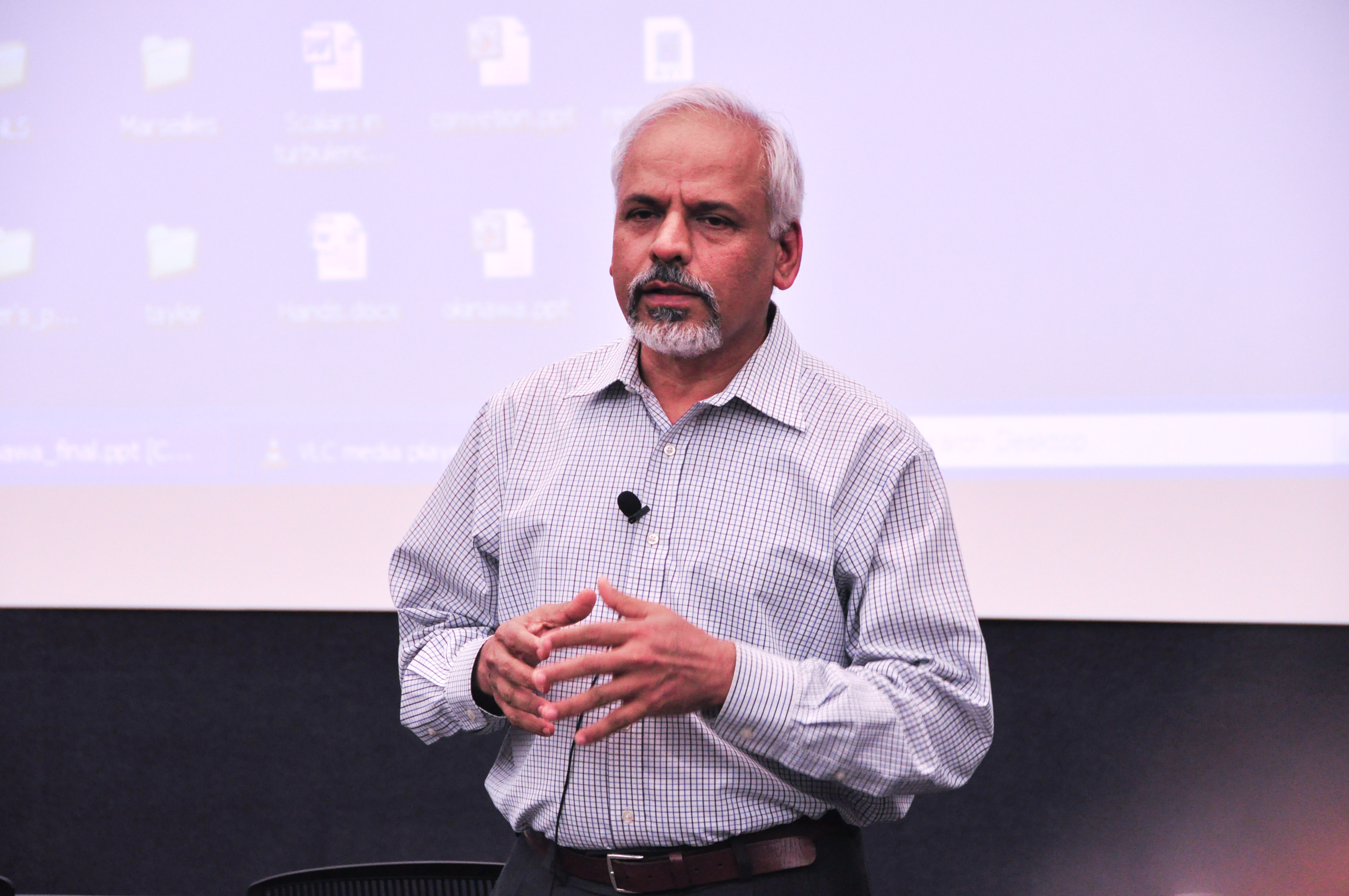
K. R. Sreenivasan

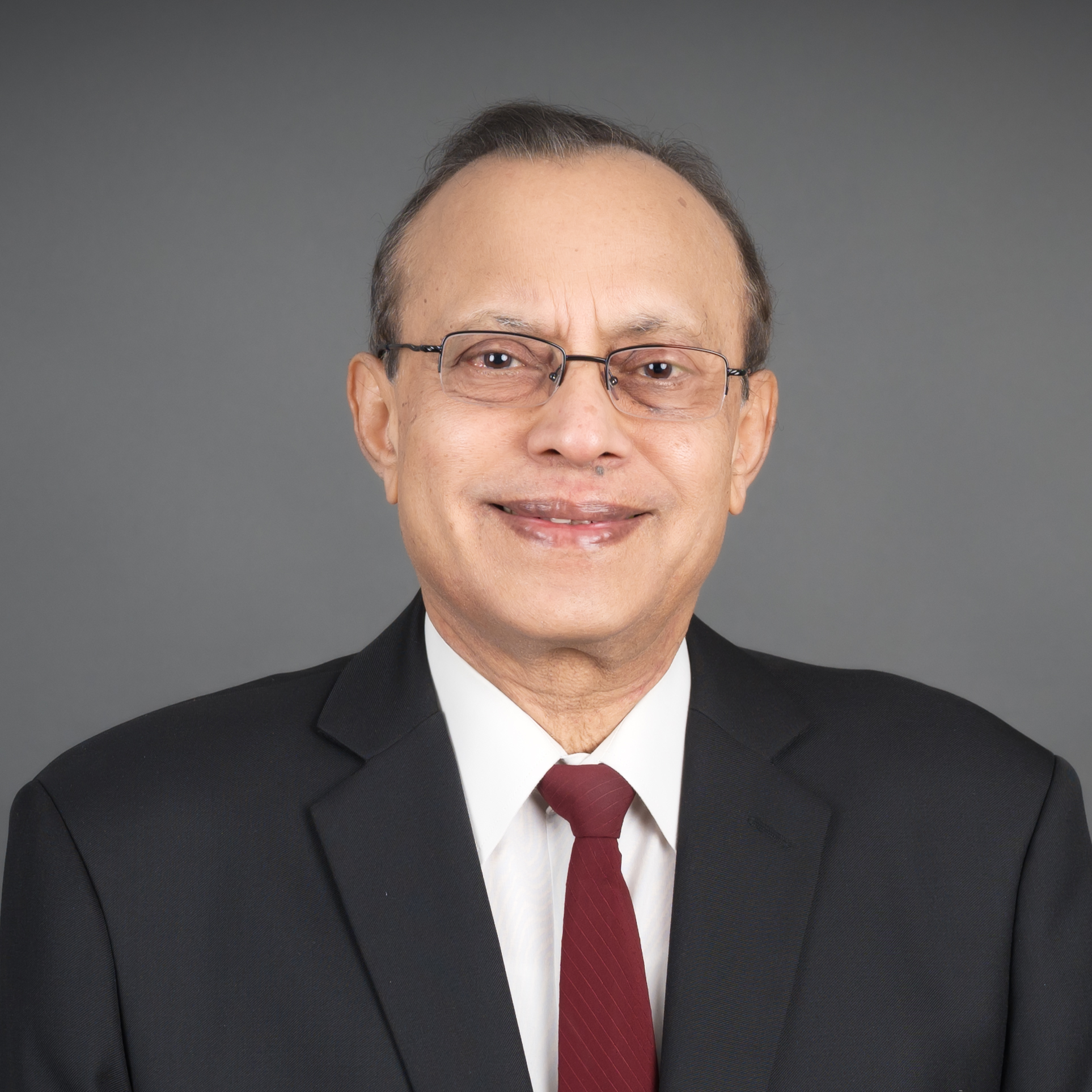
Sachidananda Kangovi Aerospace Engineer, IT Executive and Author

=== Notable faculty ===
Two former directors, C. V. Raman and C. N. R. Rao, have been awarded India's highest civilian honour Bharat Ratna. Four former directors, Sir A. G. Bourne, Sir Martin O. Forster, C. V. Raman and J. C. Ghosh, have been knighted. Among the IISc alumni, there are three Rhodes Scholars, several Fellows of the Royal Society, and thousands of members of Indian and foreign Academy of Sciences. Hundreds of IISc faculty members have also received the Shanti Swarup Bhatnagar Prize for Science and Technology awarded to Indians who have made outstanding contributions under 45 years of age.

- Perdur Radhakantha Adiga
- G. K. Ananthasuresh
- P. Balaram
- Dipankar Banerjee
- Ganapati Shankar Bhat
- Shalabh Bhatnagar
- Santanu Bhattacharya
- Vivek Borkar
- Tushar Kanti Chakraborty
- S. P. Chakravarti
- Akhil Ranjan Chakravarty
- Dipshikha Chakravortty
- Nagasuma Chandra
- Jayaraman Chandrasekhar
- Srinivasan Chandrasekaran
- Kamanio Chattopadhyay
- Atul Chokshi
- Saumitra Das
- Devadas Devaprabhakara
- S. Dhawan
- Patrick D'Silva
- K. R. K. Easwaran
- Gilbert John Fowler
- V. M. Ghatage
- Rohini Godbole
- Balasubramanian Gopal
- Jayant R. Haritsa
- Narayanaswamy Jayaraman
- Chanda Jog
- Chandrashekhar S. Jog
- Kaushal Kishore (scientist)
- H. R. Krishnamurthy
- Anurag Kumar
- Narendra Kumar (physicist)
- Rajinder Kumar (chemical engineer)
- Viswanathan Kumaran
- Giridhar Madras
- Uday Maitra
- Neelesh B. Mehta
- Pramod Sadasheo Moharir
- Nuggehalli Raghuveer Moudgal
- Govindasamy Mugesh
- Partha Sarathi Mukherjee
- Manohar Lal Munjal
- Kalappa Muniyappa
- V. Nagaraja
- Ramarathnam Narasimhan
- Roddam Narasimha
- Rishikesh Narayanan
- Dorothy Norris
- R. V. Norris
- Apoorva D. Patel
- Patrick D'Silva
- Aloke Paul
- Sunil Kumar Podder
- E. S. Raja Gopal
- Ashok M. Raichur
- Vaidyeswaran Rajaraman
- G. N. Ramachandran
- Subramaniam Ramakrishnan
- C.V. Raman
- Suryanarayanasastry Ramasesha
- Sivaraj Ramaseshan
- Sriram Ramaswamy
- P. N. Rangarajan
- Srinivasan Sampath
- Kalya Jagannath Rao
- C. N. R. Rao
- N. Ravishankar
- Dipankar Das Sarma
- V. Sasisekharan
- S. K. Satheesh
- K. Sekar
- Vijay Balakrishna Shenoy
- Amit Singh
- Aninda Sinha
- Krityunjai Prasad Sinha
- K. Sivan
- Kumaravel Somasundaram
- Ajay Sood
- Adusumilli Srikrishna
- G. S. R. Subba Rao
- J. J. Sudborough
- Utpal S. Tatu
- Sundaram Thangavelu
- Siva Umapathy
- Raghavan Varadarajan
- Sudhir Kumar Vempati
- M. Vijayan
- P. N. Vinayachandran
- Sandhya Srikant Visweswariah

== See also ==
- Indian Institutes of Technology
- Tata Institute of Fundamental Research
- Indian Institutes of Science Education and Research
- IISc Guidance, Control and Decision Systems Laboratory
- List of universities in India
- List of autonomous higher education institutes in India
- Open access in India
