= Debasisa Mohanty =

Indian computational biologist and bioinformatician

- Born: 30 November 1966 (age 59); Odisha, India
- Education: IIT Kanpur; Indian Institute of Science; Hebrew University of Jerusalem; Scripps Research Institute
- Known for: Studies on computer simulation of biomolecular systems
- Awards: 2005 OBA Samanta Chandrashekhar Award; 2007 Rajib Goyal Prize; 2009 N-BIOS Prize
- Scientific career
- Fields: Computational biology; Bioinformatics
- Workplaces: National Institute of Immunology, India

Debasisa Mohanty (born 30 November 1966) is an Indian computational biologist, bioinformatician and a staff scientists at the National Institute of Immunology, India. Known for his studies on structure and function prediction of proteins, genome analysis and computer simulation of biomolecular systems, Mohanty is an elected fellow of all the three major Indian science academies namely the Indian Academy of Sciences, the Indian National Science Academy and the National Academy of Sciences, India. The Department of Biotechnology of the Government of India awarded him the National Bioscience Award for Career Development, one of the highest Indian science awards, for his contributions to biosciences, in 2009.

== Biography ==
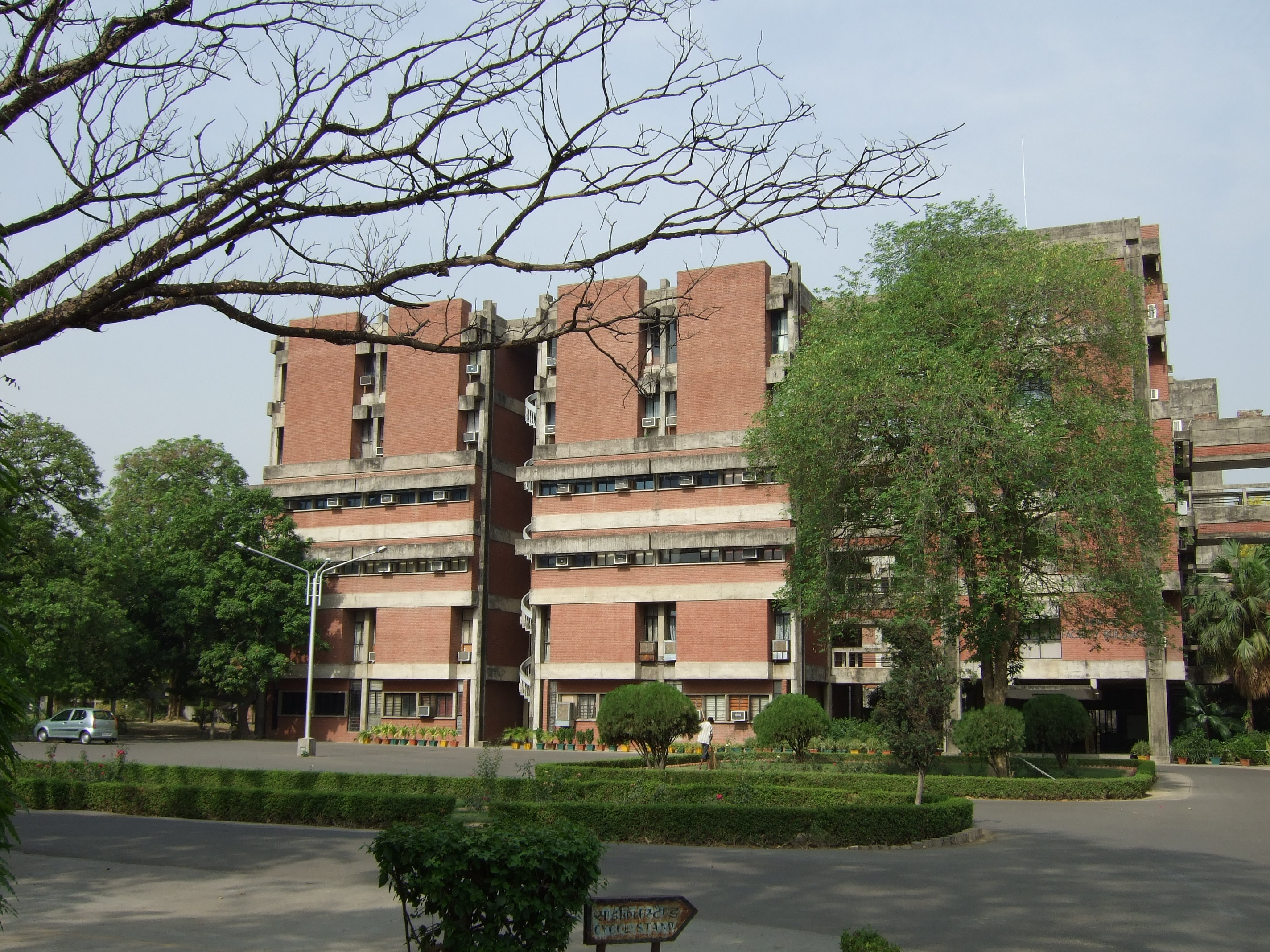
IIT Kanpur

Born on 30 November 1966, Debasisa Mohanty earned a post graduate degree (MSc) in physics from the Indian Institute of Technology, Kanpur in 1988 and did his doctoral studies at the Molecular Biophysics Unit of the Indian Institute of Science to secure a PhD in computational biophysics in 1994. Subsequently, he completed his post-doctoral work, first the Hebrew University of Jerusalem and, later, at the Scripps Research Institute. On his return to India, he joined the National Institute of Immunology, India (NII) where he serves as a Grade VII staff scientist and hosts a number of research scholars at his laboratory. He currently hold director position at NII. At NII, he also supervises the activities of RiPPMiner, (Bioinformatics Resource for Deciphering Chemical Structures of RiPPs) and the Bioinformatics Centre.

Mohanty resides at the NII Campus, along Aruna Asaf Ali Marg in New Delhi.

== Legacy ==
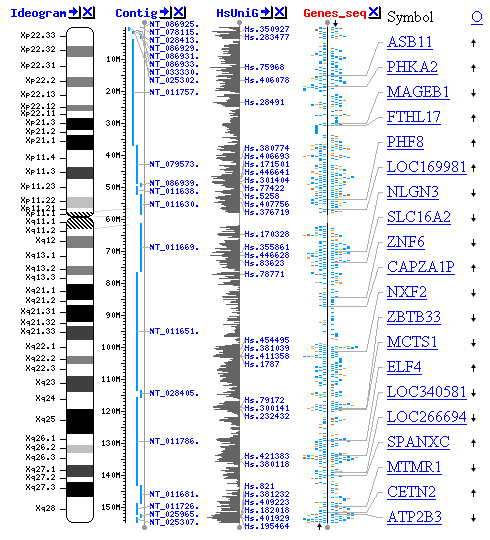
A partially sequenced genome.

Mohanty's research focus is in the fields of computational biology and bioinformatics and he is known to have developed computational methods for predicting the substrate specificity of proteins as well as identified biosynthetic pathways. His work has assisted in widening the understanding of the function of putative proteins in genomes and the protein interaction networks in newly sequenced genomes. His studies have been documented by way of a number of articles (Note: Please see Selected bibliography section) and ResearchGate, an online repository of scientific articles has listed 108 of them.

Mohanty was a member of the national organizing committee of the International Conference in Bioinformatics (INCOB) held in 2006 in India and has delivered invited speeches at various conferences which included the seminar series on Proteomics and bioinformatics of the Regional Centre for Biotechnology held in 2013, the Symposium on Accelerating Biology 2017: Delivering Precision of the Centre for Development of Advanced Computing (C-DAC) held in January 2017 in Pune, and the Symposium on Functional Genomics organized by the Indraprastha Institute of Information Technology in Delhi in December 2017.

== Awards and honors ==
Mohanty received the Samanta Chandrashekhar Award of the Orissa Bigyan Academy in 2005 and the Rajib Goyal Young Scientist Prize in Life Sciences of Kurukshetra University in 2007. The National Academy of Sciences, India elected him as a fellow the next year and the Department of Biotechnology (DBT) of the Government of India awarded him the National Bioscience Award for Career Development, one of the highest Indian science awards in 2009. He became an elected fellow of the Indian Academy of Sciences in 2012 and of the Indian National Science Academy in 2013.

== Selected bibliography ==
- Agrawal, Priyesh; Khater, Shradha; Gupta, Money; Sain, Neetu; Mohanty, Debasisa (3 July 2017). "RiPPMiner: a bioinformatics resource for deciphering chemical structures of RiPPs based on prediction of cleavage and cross-links". Nucleic Acids Research. 45 (W1): W80–W88. doi:10.1093/nar/gkx408. ISSN 0305-1048. PMC 5570163. PMID 28499008.
- Sharma, Chhaya; Mohanty, Debasisa (2018). "Sequence- and structure-based analysis of proteins involved in miRNA biogenesis". Journal of Biomolecular Structure and Dynamics. 36 (1): 139–151. doi:10.1080/07391102.2016.1269687. PMID 27928938. S2CID 11253090.
- Khater, Shradha; Anand, Swadha; Mohanty, Debasisa (2016). "In silico methods for linking genes and secondary metabolites: The way forward". Synthetic and Systems Biotechnology. 1 (2): 80–88. doi:10.1016/j.synbio.2016.03.001. PMC 5640692. PMID 29062931.

== See also ==
- Protein–protein interaction
- In silico
