= M. R. N. Murthy =

Indian scientist

M. R. N. Murthy (Mattur Ramabhadrashastry Narasimha Murthy), was a professor of molecular biophysics at the Indian Institute of Science, IISc, Bangalore. He currently teaches at the Institute of Bioinformatics and Applied Biotechnology, Bengaluru. His chief contributions are in the area of X-ray crystallography. He was awarded the Shanti Swarup Bhatnagar award for outstanding contribution to physical sciences, which is the highest honour for a scientist in India, in the year 1992.

== Biographical sketch ==
M.R.N. Murthy was born in the small village of Mattur situated in the Shimoga District of Karnataka State. The primary education of Murthy was at the Government school of his native village. He obtained higher secondary education in the nearby town of Shimoga, as there was no higher secondary school in the village. Murthy belongs to one of the initial generations to leave the village for higher education. Because of this background, Murthy has intimate knowledge of Indian rural traditions and customs. After his Pre-University education at Shimoga, Murthy joined the Central College in Bangalore as an honours student of physics. Following this, he joined the Indian Institute of Technology, Madras (the present Chennai) to study masters course in physics. After obtaining masters degree, he joined the organic chemistry Department of the prestigious Indian Institute of Science for his doctoral studies under the guidance of Professor K. Venkatesan, a well-known Indian crystallographer. Murthy's doctoral work was partially concerned with conformation of peptides. Murthy determined some peptide structures and carried out molecular mechanics calculation on model peptides to understand their conformational properties. These studies kindled Murthy's interest in macromolecular crystallography. Therefore, after obtaining his doctorate degree from the Indian Institute of Science, he joined Purdue University, West Lafayette, Indiana, United States, as a post doctoral fellow to work on structure determination of glyceraldehyde-3-phosphate dehydrogenase and catalase under the leadership of Professor M.G. Rossmann, a world-renowned crystallographer.

After spending 4 years, which gave the Murthy the experience and confidence to initiate his own studies in structural biology, he returned to the Indian Institute of Science, Bangalore. During the initial year, he was associated with the Department of Physics following which he joined the Molecular Biophysics Unit of the same Institute, where he has remained since. He initiated structural studies on isometric viruses in India at a time when research on macromolecular protein crystallography was being initiated for the first time in the country by Professor M. Vijayan at the Molecular Biophysics Unit of IISc and Dr. K.K. Kannan at the Bhabha Atomic Research Centre, Bombay. At that time, there were no experimental facilities for carrying out macromolecular structural work at the Indian Institute of Science, or anywhere else in the country. Murthy, along with Professor M. Vijayan, established X-ray diffraction facility at the Molecular Biophysics Unit, which served as the national nucleus for crystallographic work in the initial decade of such structural work in India. His success is reflected in the successful conclusion of several structural studies on virus particles, which are the only such studies performed in the twentieth century in South East Asia. He successfully determined the structure of Sesabania Mosaic virus.

Prof. Murthy is an exceptional teacher and mentor. His course on advanced biomolecular crystallography was very popular with students at the Indian Institute of Science. His unique teaching methodology combined with his passion for the science he was doing was infectious and has inspired a generation of scientists.

== Awards ==
Adjunct professor at Purdue University, 1989-1992.

Elected to the Indian Academy of Sciences, 1992.

Shanti Swaroop Bhatnagar Prize, 1993.

Elected to the Indian National Science Academy, 1996.

Indian Science Platinum Jubilee Lecture, 1999.

Fellow of the National Academy of Sciences, 2001.

Rustum Choksi award for excellence in Science, 2002.

R.L. Kapur endowment lecture, Ramanujan Mathematical Society, 2003

G. N. Ramachandran Commemoration award, 2003

Fellow of the third world Academy of sciences, 2004

Hari Om Ashram Trust Award, 2004

Jagdish Chandra Bose Award for Life Sciences, 2005

Astra-Zeneca distinguished Scientist award for the popularization of Science, 2005
