= Sudhir Kumar Vempati =

Indian Physicist

- Known for: Studies in neutrino physics
- Awards: 2016 Shanti Swarup Bhatnagar Prize
- Scientific career
- Fields: High energy physics
- Institutions: Indian Institute of Science
- Doctoral advisor: Anjan Joshipura

Sudhir Kumar Vempati is an Indian high energy physicist and a professor at the Centre for High Energy Physics of the Indian Institute of Science. He is known for his studies in neutrino physics, especially Large Hadron Collider Inverse problem and has published a number of articles, (Note: Please see Selected bibliography section) ResearchGate, an online repository of scientific articles has listed 76 of them. He is a member of the Indo-French Collaboration on High Energy Physics. The Council of Scientific and Industrial Research, the apex agency of the Government of India for scientific research, awarded him the Shanti Swarup Bhatnagar Prize for Science and Technology, one of the highest Indian science awards, for his contributions to physical sciences in 2016. (Note: Long link - please select award year to see details)

== Selected bibliography ==
- Ibarra, Alejandro; Kushwaha, Ashwani; Vempati, Sudhir (6 November 2017). "Clockwork for Neutrino Masses and Lepton Flavor Violation". Physics Letters B. 780: 86–92. arXiv:1711.02070. doi:10.1016/j.physletb.2018.02.047. S2CID 67813054.
- Chowdhury, Debtosh; Patel, Ketan M.; Tata, Xerxes; Vempati, Sudhir K. (20 April 2017). "Indirect searches of the degenerate MSSM". Physical Review D. 95 (7) 075025. arXiv:1612.06471. Bibcode:2017PhRvD..95g5025C. doi:10.1103/PhysRevD.95.075025. S2CID 119398235.
- Vempati, Sudhir K.; Mummidi, V. S.; Khosa, Charanjit K.; Byakti, Pritibhajan (1 March 2017). "Higgs mass from neutrino-messenger mixing". Journal of High Energy Physics. 2017 (3): 28. arXiv:1607.03447. Bibcode:2017JHEP...03..028B. doi:10.1007/JHEP03(2017)028. ISSN 1029-8479.
- Vempati, Sudhir K.; Patel, Ketan M.; Passera, Massimo; Chun, Eung Jin; Broggio, Alessandro (1 November 2014). "Limiting two-Higgs-doublet models". Journal of High Energy Physics. 2014 (11): 58. arXiv:1409.3199. Bibcode:2014JHEP...11..058B. doi:10.1007/JHEP11(2014)058. ISSN 1029-8479.
- Jin Chun, Eung; Suryanarayana Mummidi, V; Vempati, Sudhir (21 May 2014). "Anatomy of Higgs mass in Supersymmetric Inverse Seesaw Models". Physics Letters B. 736: 470–477. arXiv:1405.5478. Bibcode:2014PhLB..736..470C. doi:10.1016/j.physletb.2014.08.002.

== See also ==
- Flavour (particle physics)
- Two-Higgs-doublet model
