= P. N. Vinayachandran =

Indian scientist, professor

- Born: Thrissur, Kerala, India
- Education: Indian Institute of Science
- Known for: Indian ocean modeling; Thermodynamics and salinity effects; Physical – biological interactions in the ocean; oceanographic field experiments; river ocean interactions
- Awards: Shanti Swarup Bhatnagar Award (2008); J C Bose National Fellow; Fellow, Indian Academy of Science, Bangalore; Fellow, National Academy of Sciences, India
- Scientific career
- Fields: Oceanography
- Workplaces: Centre for Atmospheric and Oceanic Sciences; Indian Institute of Science, Bangalore, Divecha Centre for Climate Change
- Doctoral advisor: Satish Shetye; Sulochana Gadgil

P. N. Vinayachandran is a professor of oceanography at the Centre for Atmospheric and Oceanic Sciences (CAOS), Indian Institute of Science, Bangalore, India. He is the recipient of the 2008 Shanti Swarup Bhatnagar Award.

== Biography ==
P. N. Vinayachandran hails from the state of Kerala. He obtained his M.Sc. (Engg.) in Oceanography from the Indian Institute of Science and Doctorate in Oceanography in 1996 from Indian Institute of Science, Bangalore. Having done Post-doctoral research in the University of Tokyo he continued in Japan to work as a Senior Researcher at the Frontier System for Global Change, JAMSTEC. In 1999, he returned to India to join as a member of Faculty at the Center for Atmospheric and Oceanic Sciences, Indian Institute of Science, Bengaluru India, where he is currently a professor of oceanography.
