= A. M. Jayannavar =

Indian physicist (1956–2021)

- Born: 22 July 1956 (age 70); Karnataka, India
- Died: 22 November 2021 (aged 65)
- Education: 1973–76 Govindram Seksaria Science College; 1976–78 Karnatak University; 1978–82 Indian Institute of Science
- Known for: Studies on Stochastic processes, Non-equilibrium statistical mechanics, mesoscopic systems
- Awards: 1996 CTP Prize; 1998 Shanti Swarup Bhatnagar Prize; 2004 G. D. Birla Award
- Scientific career
- Fields: Condensed matter physics
- Workplaces: 1983–84 International Centre for Theoretical Physics; 1988–90 University of Ulm; 1991– Institute of Physics, Bhubaneswar; Homi Bhabha National Institute-visiting
- Doctoral advisor: N. Kumar; E. S. Raja Gopal

Arun Mallojirao Jayannavar (22 July 1956 - 22 November 2021) was an Indian condensed matter physicist and a senior professor at the Institute of Physics, Bhubaneswar. Known for his research on many interdisciplinary areas of condensed matter physics, Jayannavar was an elected fellow of all the three major Indian science academies viz. Indian Academy of Sciences, National Academy of Sciences, India and Indian National Science Academy. The Council of Scientific and Industrial Research, the apex agency of the government of India for scientific research, awarded Jayannavar the Shanti Swarup Bhatnagar Prize for Science and Technology, one of the highest Indian science awards, for his contributions to physical sciences in 1998.

== Biography ==
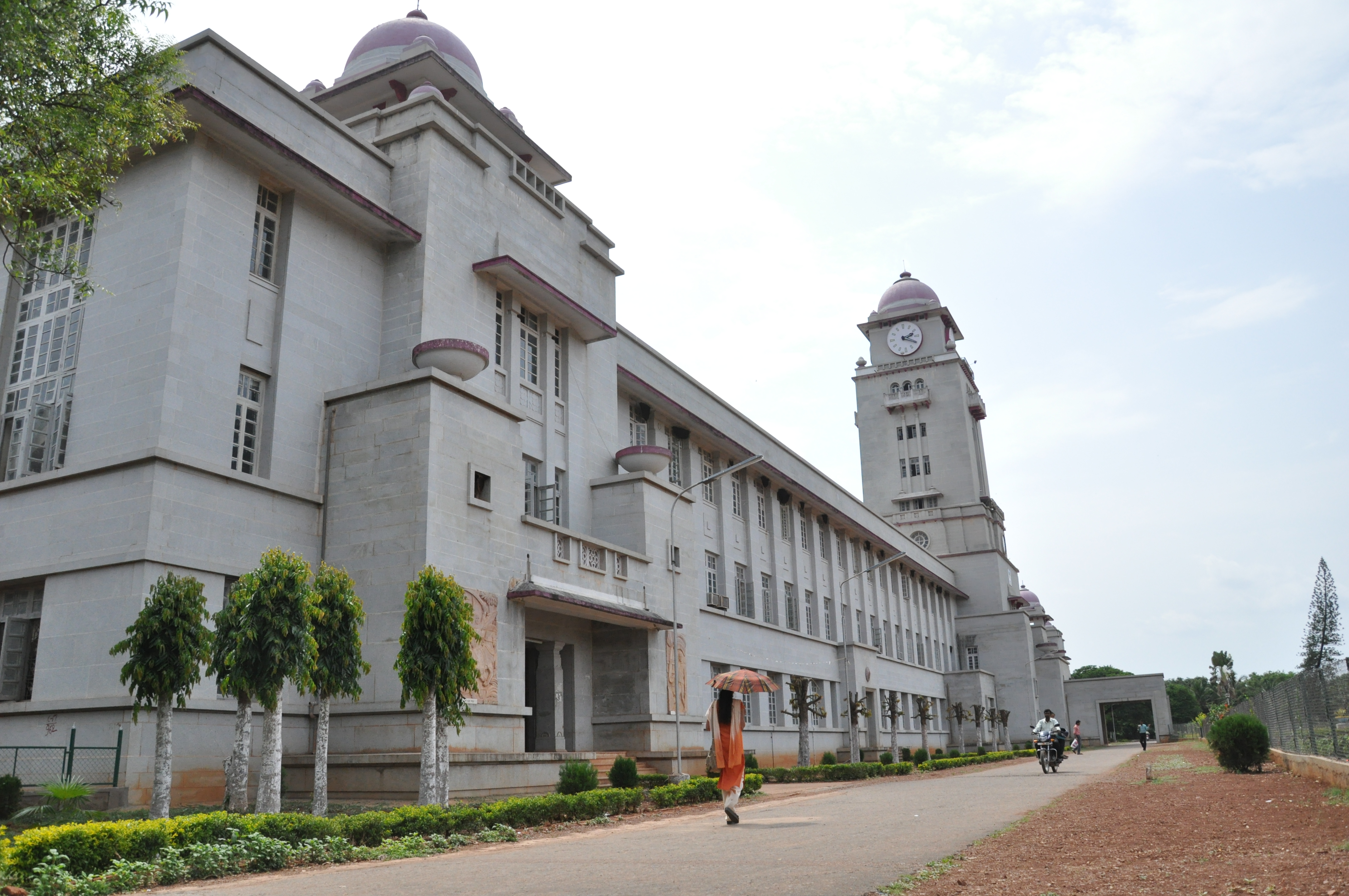
Karnataka University, Dharwad

Born on 22 July 1956, Arun M. Jayannavar obtained a BSc from Govindram Seksaria Science College, Belgaum, Karnataka in 1976 and did his master's degree at Karnataka University to earn an MSc in 1978. His doctoral studies were at the Indian Institute of Science where he was mentored by S. S. Bhatnagar laureates, Narendra Kumar (physicist) and E. S. Raja Gopal and after securing a PhD in 1982, he moved to Italy to do his post-doctoral work at the International Centre for Theoretical Physics (ICTP) as a visiting scientist. Jayannavar also had a second stint abroad at the University of Ulm during 1988–90 as an Alexander von Humboldt Fellow. On his return to India in 1991, he joined the Institute of Physics, Bhubaneswar as a member of faculty where he holds the position of a senior professor. He was also a visiting senior professor at the Homi Bhabha National Institute of the Department of Atomic Energy, situated in Mumbai.

== Legacy ==
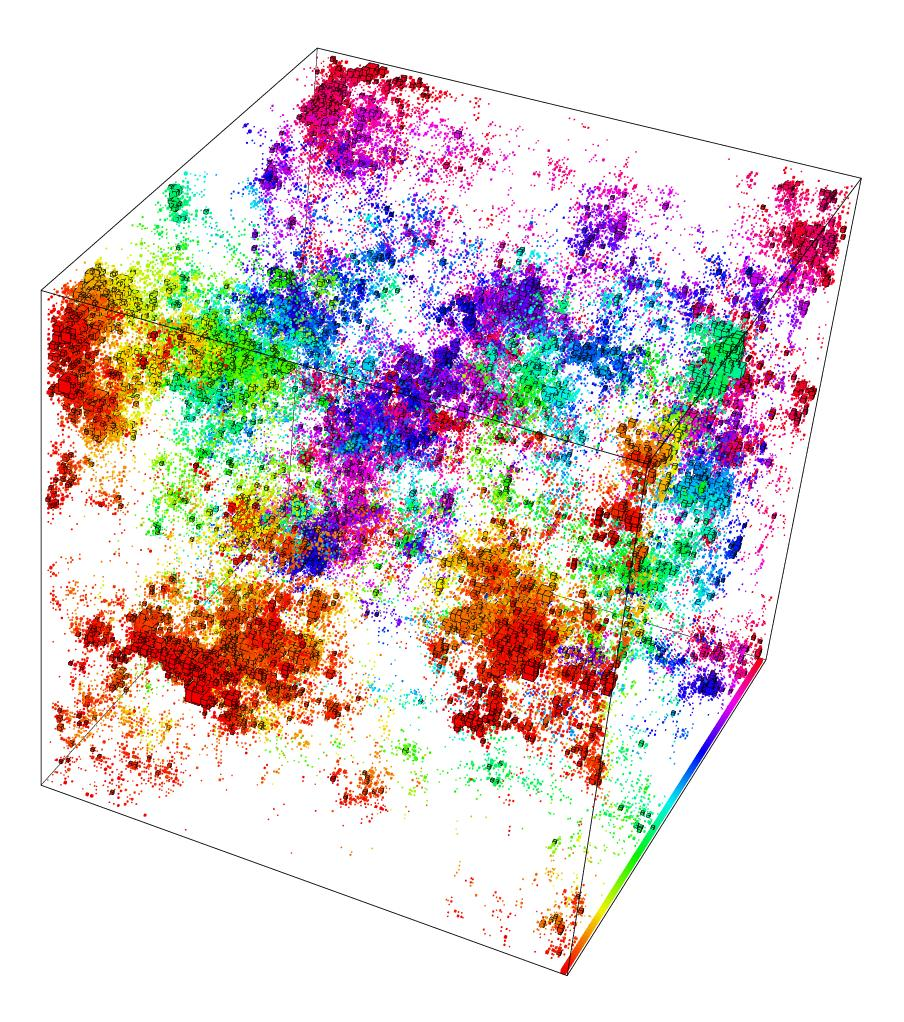
Anderson transition-multifractal

Jayannavar's research interests have been in the interdisciplinary areas of condensed matter physics, with special focus on theoretical condensed matter physics, Stochastic processes, non-equilibrium statistical mechanics, and classical and quantum problems in random media and physics of mesoscopic systems. High temperature superconductors, thermal ratchets and molecular motors, heat pumps at nanoscales, Anderson localization, delay times, random lasers, giant diffusion; fluctuation theorems are some of the areas he has worked on and he is reported to have made significant contributions in the elucidation of a number theoretical problems. Jayannavar's studies have been documented by way of a number of articles (Note: Please see Selected bibliography section) and the online article repository of the Indian Academy of Sciences has listed 168 of them. He was also a member of the editorial boards of science journals viz. Current Science and Pramana and sat in the executive council of Indian Physics Association from 2010 to 2012.

== Awards and honors ==
The International Centre for Theoretical Physics awarded Jayannavar the ICTP Prize in the field of solid state physics (in honour of Nevill Francis Mott) in 1996 and the Indian Academy of Sciences elected him as a fellow the same year. The Council of Scientific and Industrial Research awarded him the Shanti Swarup Bhatnagar Prize, one of the highest Indian science awards in 1998. Two of the other major Indian science academies, Indian National Science Academy and National Academy of Sciences, India elected Jayannavar as their fellow in 2002 and 2003 respectively and he received the G. D. Birla Award for Scientific Research in 2004.

== Selected bibliography ==
- Jayannavar, A. M.; Sahoo, Mamata (2008). "Fluctuation theorems and orbital magnetism in nonequilibrium state". Pramana - Journal of Physics. 70 (2): 201–210. arXiv:0704.2992. Bibcode:2008Prama..70..201J. doi:10.1007/s12043-008-0039-7. S2CID 1789544.
- Lahiri, S.; Jayannavar, A. M. (2009). "Total entropy production fluctuation theorems in a nonequilibrium time-periodic steady state". European Physical Journal B. 69 (1): 87–92. arXiv:0811.0795. Bibcode:2009EPJB...69...87L. doi:10.1140/epjb/e2009-00017-7. S2CID 12697152.
- Sahoo, M.; Lahiri, S.; Jayannavar, A. M. (2011). "Fluctuation theorems and a typical trajectories". Journal of Physics A: Mathematical and General. 44 (20) 205001 (published 2010). arXiv:1012.1006. Bibcode:2011JPhA...44t5001S. doi:10.1088/1751-8113/44/20/205001. S2CID 119245135.
- Abhinav, Kumar; Panigrahi, P. K.; Jayannavar, Arun (2013). "Scattering properties of PT - symmetric quantum systems". Annals of Physics. 331 (2013): 110. arXiv:1109.3113. Bibcode:2013AnPhy.331..110A. doi:10.1016/j.aop.2013.01.002. S2CID 118484197.
- Lahiri, Sourabh; Rana, Shubhashis; Jayannavar, A. M. (2012). "Fluctuation theorems in presence of information gain and feedback". Journal of Physics A: Mathematical and Theoretical. 45 (6) 065002. arXiv:1109.6508. Bibcode:2012JPhA...45f5002L. doi:10.1088/1751-8113/45/6/065002. S2CID 119295011.

== See also ==
- Mesoscopic physics
- Superconductivity
