= G. D. Birla Award for Scientific Research =

G.D. Birla Award for Scientific Research
- Description: Recognition for outstanding scientific research in all branches of science
- Country: India
- Presented by: K. K. Birla Foundation
- First award: 1991

G.D. Birla Award for Scientific Research is an award instituted in 1991 by the K. K. Birla Foundation in honour of the Indian philanthropist Ghanshyam Das Birla. The award is given to an outstanding scientific research, mostly during the past 5 years, undertaken by an Indian scientist, who is below the age of 50, living and working in India. It carries a cash prize of ₹5 lakhs (0.5 million). The award is given every year and is available for all branches of science including medical science, basic and applied.

For the year 2022 it was awarded to Professor Narayan Pradhan for his Outstanding Contribution in the field of MATERIAL SCIENCES.

== Recipients ==
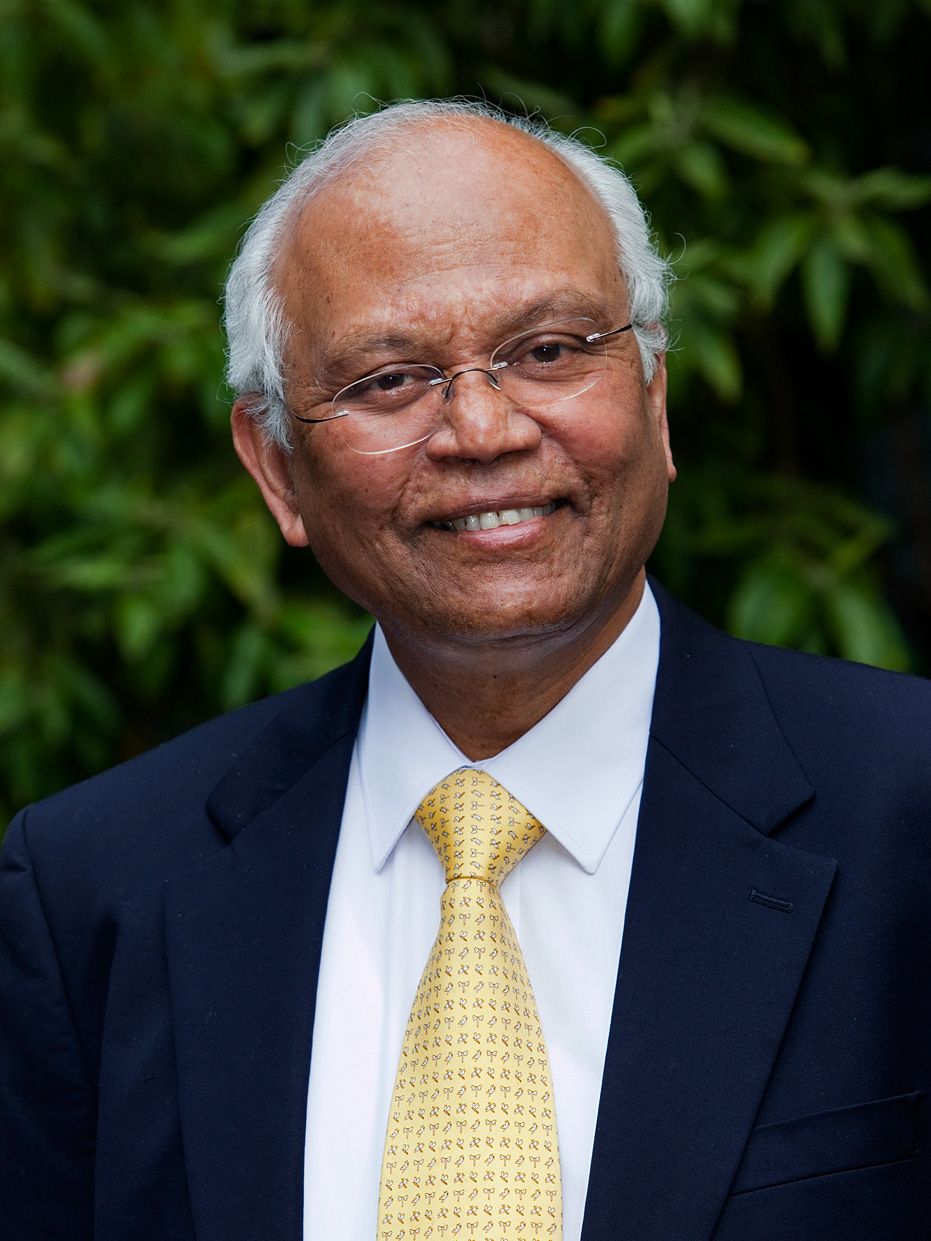
Raghunath Anant Mashelkar

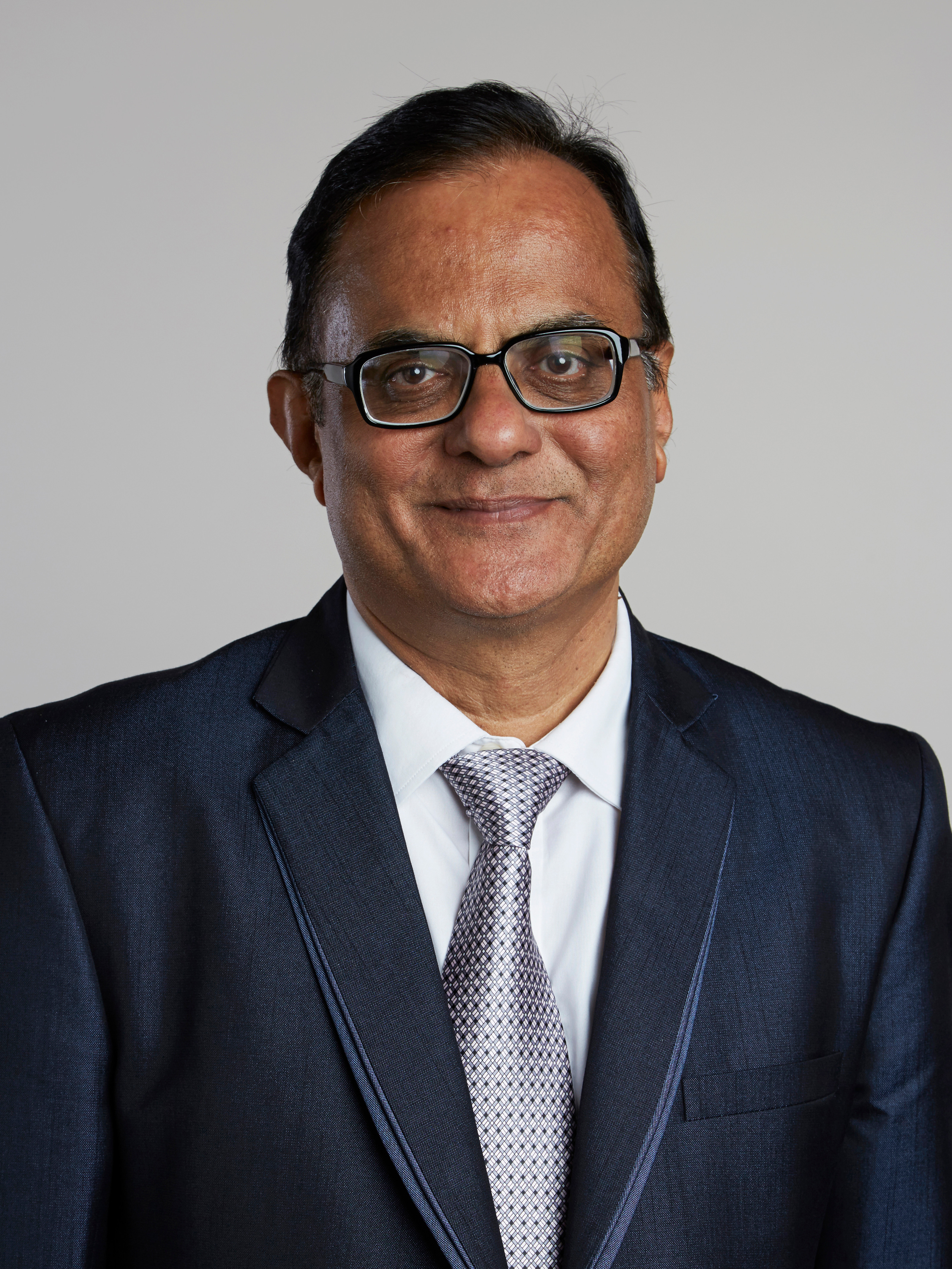
Ajay K. Sood

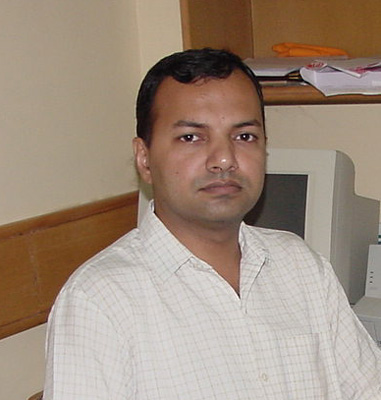
Manindra Agrawal

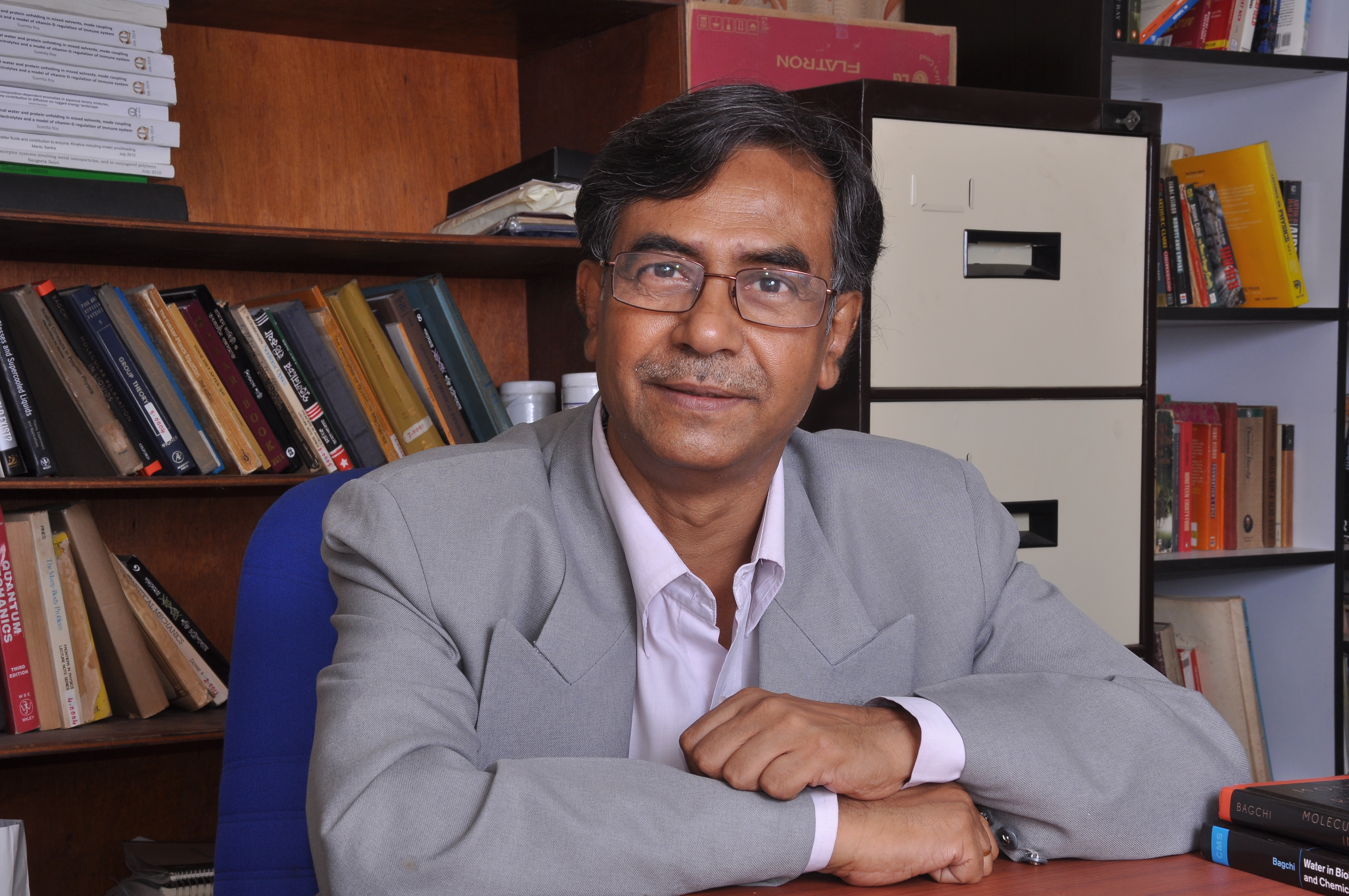
Biman Bagchi

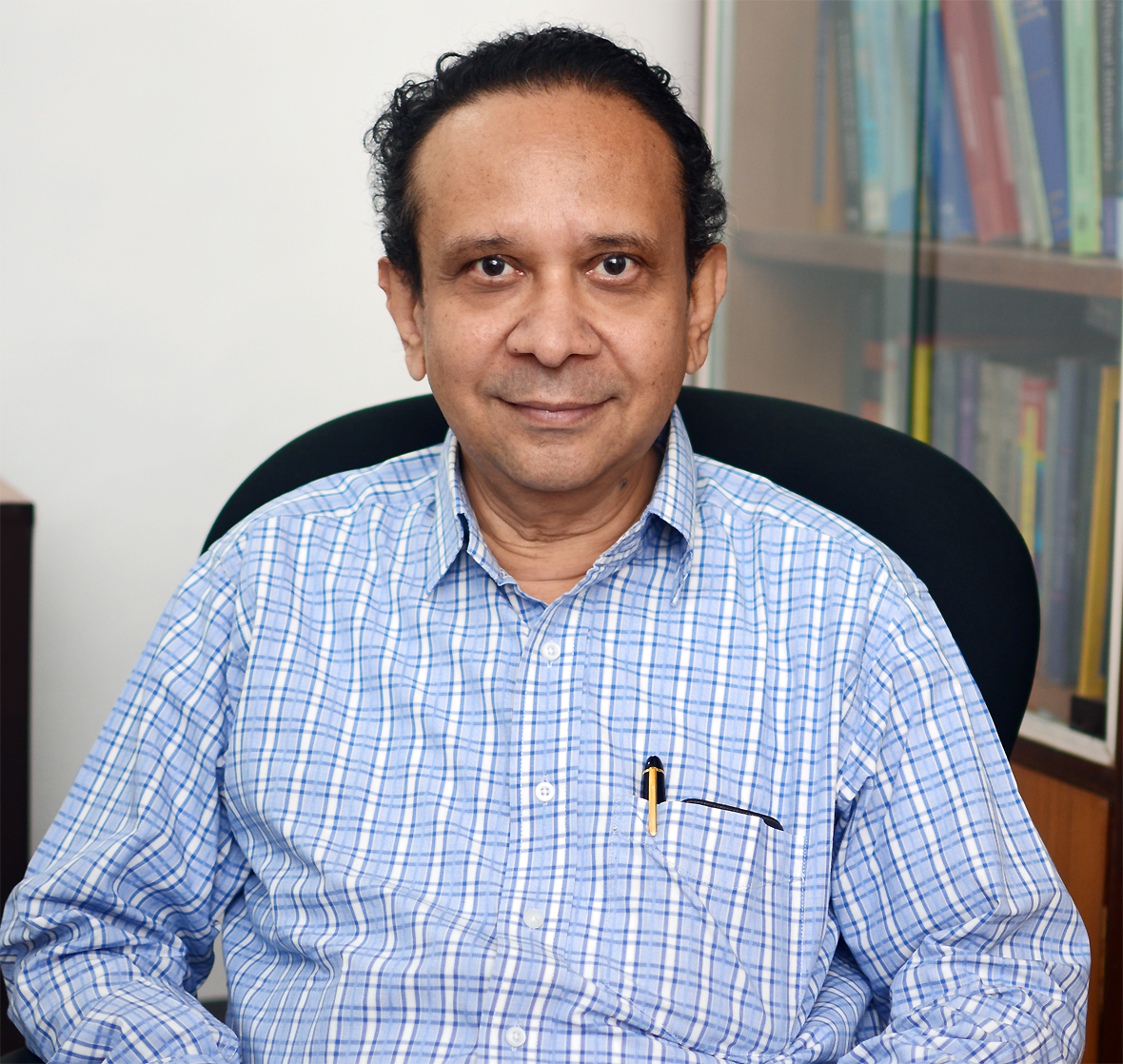
Thanu Padmanabhan

Rajesh Gopakumar

Year	Recipient	Field	Institution
2023	Prof. Aditi Sen(De)	Quantum Information and Computation	Harish-Chandra Research Institute
2022	Prof. Narayan Pradhan	Outstanding contribution to Material Science	Indian Association for the Cultivation of Science
2021	Prof Suman Chakraborty	Outstanding contribution to engineering science and its applications in developing technologies for affordable healthcare.	Indian Institute of Technology Kharagpur
2018	Rajeev Kumar Varshney	Agriculture	International Crops Research Institute for the Semi-Arid Tropics, Hyderabad
2017	Dr.Rajan Shankarnarayanan	Structural biology	centre for cellular and molecular biology, Hyderabad
2016	Prof. Umesh Vasudeo Waghmare	Physics	Jawaharlal Nehru Centre for Advanced Scientific Research
2015	Sanjay Mittal	High performance computing	Indian Institute of Technology, Kanpur
2014	Sanjeev Galande	Cell biology	Indian Institute of Science, Education and Research, Pune
2013	Rajesh Gopakumar	Quantum field theory and string theory	Harish Chandra Research Institute
2012	Nibir Mandal	Structural geology	Jadavpur University
2011	Tapas Kumar Kundu	Biochemistry	Jawaharlal Nehru Centre for Advanced Scientific Research
2010	Subhasis Chaudhuri	Electrical engineering	Indian Institute of Technology, Mumbai
2009	Manindra Agrawal	Computer science	Indian Institute of Technology, Kanpur
2008	Raghavan Varadarajan	Biophysics	Indian Institute of Science
2007	Santanu Bhattacharya	Chemistry	Indian Institute of Science
2006	Sriram Ramaswamy	Physics	Indian Institute of Science
2005	Dipankar Das Sarma	Nanotechnology	Indian Institute of Science
2004	Arun M. Jayannvar	Physics	Institute of Physics, Bhubaneswar
2003	Thanu Padmanabhan	Astrophysics	Inter-University Centre for Astronomy and Astrophysics
2002	P. P. Majumdar	Human genetics	Indian Statistical Institute
2001	Seyed E. Hasnain	Medical genetics	University of Hyderabad
2000	Ajay K. Sood	Experimental physics	Indian Institute of Science
1999	Sankar K. Pal	Computer engineering	Indian Statistical Institute
1998	Not awarded		
1997	Biman Bagchi	Structural chemistry	Indian Institute of Science
1996	Ashoke Sen	Theoretical physics	Harish-Chandra Research Institute
1995	Girish S. Agarwal	Quantum optics	Physical Research Laboratory
1994	Padmanabhan Balaram	Biochemistry	Indian Institute of Science
1993	R.A. Mashelkar	Polymer science	Council of Scientific & Industrial Research
1992	Goverdhan Mehta	Organic chemistry	University of Hyderabad
1991	Asis Datta	Molecular biology	National Centre for Plant Genome Research

== See also ==
- List of general science and technology awards
