= Amitava =

Amitava is a given name. Notable people with the name include:

- Amitava Banerjee (born 1972), Indian born Guernsey cricketer
- Amitava Bhattacharjee (physicist), theoretical plasma physicist, professor at Princeton University
- Amitava Bhattacharya (born 1973), Indian actor who works in Bengali and Hindi films
- Amitava Bose, professor of economics at Indian Institute of Management Calcutta
- Amitava Chakraborty (born 1981), Indian cricketer
- Amitava Chattopadhyay (born 1956), the GlaxoSmithKline Chaired Professor in Corporate Innovation
- Amitava Das (born 1969), Indian former cricketer
- Amitava Datta, Indian scientist and professor in high energy physics
- Amitava Ghosh, IEEE Fellow and Head of North America Radio Systems Research at Nokia
- Amitava Kumar (born 1963), Indian writer and journalist
- Amitava Nandy (1943–2014), member of the 14th Lok Sabha of India
- Amitava Raychaudhuri, Indian theoretical particle physicist
- Amitava Roy (born 1953), judge of the Supreme Court of India
- Amitava Roy (cricketer) (born 1953), Indian cricketer
