= H. B. Walikar =

Indian mathematician

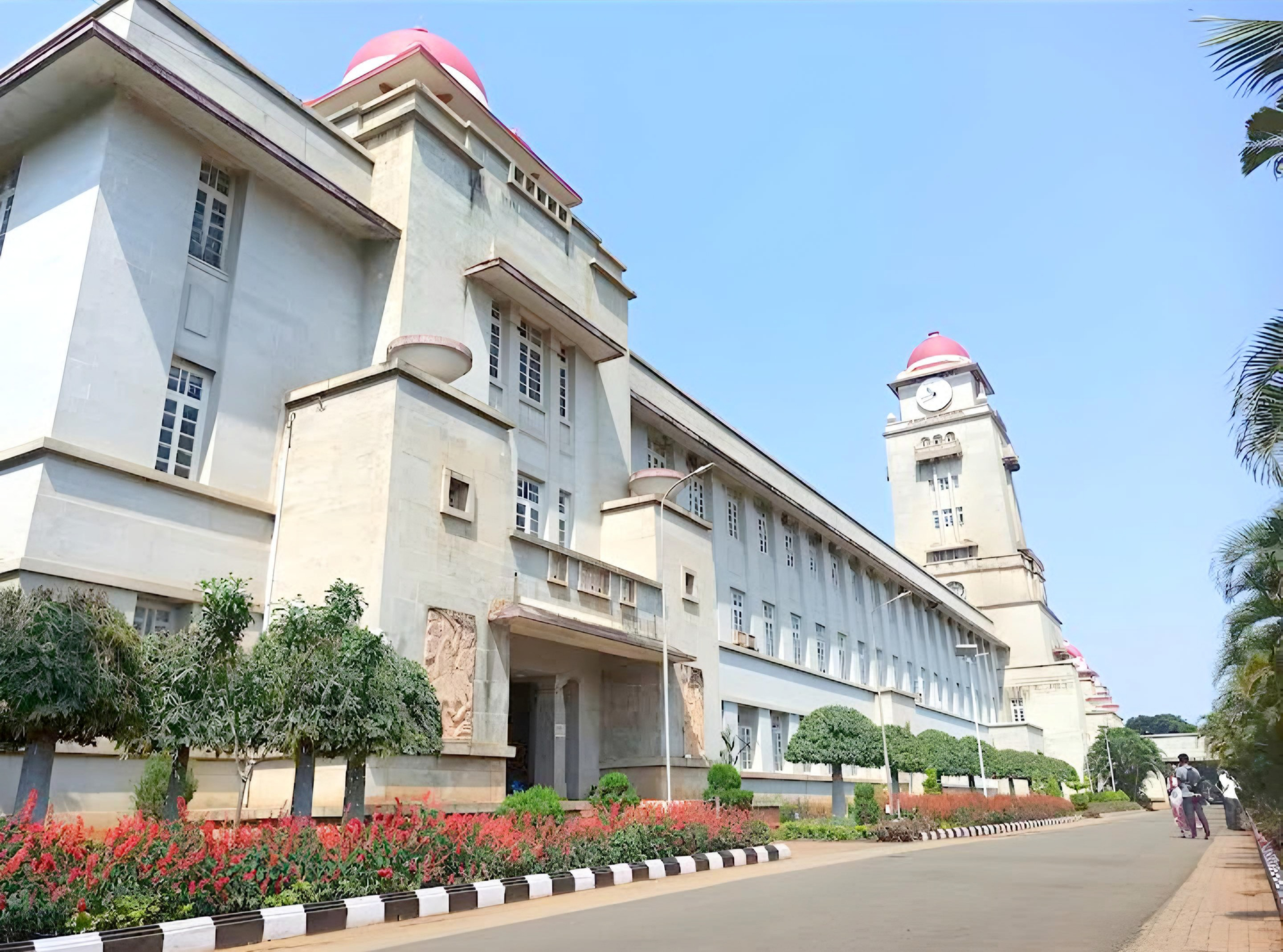
Karnatak University Dharwad

H. B. Walikar (born 18 March 1951) is an Indian academic. He served as vice-chancellor of Karnatak University in Dharwad, India.

== Early life ==
He was born in Yaragal village in Muddebihal taluk of Bijapur district, in the Indian state of Karnataka. Walikar completed his education in Karnataka before pursuing research in graph theory at the Mehta Research Institute, Allahabad (now Harish-Chandra Research Institute), under the guidance of B. D. Acharya.

== Career ==
Walikar served at institutions including Karnatak College Dharwad, Government Degree College Bangalore, and Karnatak University Dharwad. He served as chairman of the Department of Computer Science and administrator of the KUPG Centre in Belgaum.

Walikar contributed to Kannada literature and authored books including Sense in Nonsense, God’s Own Equation, and Nanu, Ninu Mattu Devaru.

As vice-chancellor of Karnatak University from 2010, he introduced initiatives related to research development, library infrastructure, scholarships, and student welfare programmes.

== Research ==
His academic work mainly focuses on graph theory, especially domination theory, spectral graph theory, and network analysis. He guided Ph.D. and M.Phil. students in mathematics and computer science.
