= T Padmanabhan =

T Padmanabhan may refer to:

- Thanu Padmanabhan, Indian astrophysicist
- Thinakkal Padmanabhan, Malayalam short story writer
