= Biswarup Mukhopadhyaya =

Indian physicist (born 1960)

- Born: 1 August 1960 (age 66); India
- Education: Rajabazar Science College, Calcutta University
- Known for: Studies on high energy colliders, Higgs bosons, neutrinos
- Awards: 2003 Shanti Swarup Bhatnagar Prize
- Scientific career
- Fields: High energy physics
- Workplaces: Indian Institute of Science Education and Research, Kolkata

Biswarup Mukhopadhyaya (born 1 August 1960) is an Indian theoretical high energy physicist and a senior professor at Indian Institute of Science Education and Research, Kolkata (IISER Kolkata). Known for his research on High energy colliders, Higgs bosons, neutrinos, Mukhopadhyaya is an elected fellow of the National Academy of Sciences, India. The Council of Scientific and Industrial Research, the apex agency of the Government of India for scientific research, awarded him the Shanti Swarup Bhatnagar Prize for Science and Technology, one of the highest Indian science awards, for his contributions to physical sciences in 2003. (Note: Long link - please select award year to see details)

== Biography ==
Mukhopadhyaya, who secured his PhD from the Rajabazar Science College campus of Calcutta University, has done reportedly notable work on neutrino mass and is known to have been successful in theorizing that gauge boson fusion as the dominant mode of supersymmetric particle production. He has delivered invited lectures at a number of conferences and was a member of the national organizing committees of the International Conference on particles, Strings and Cosmology (PASCOS), held in Mumbai in 2003 as well as the XXI DAE-BRNS High Energy Physics Symposium held in 2014. His studies have been documented by way of a number of articles (Note: Please see Selected bibliography section) and ResearchGate, an online article repository of scientific articles, has listed 184 of them. He has also edited one book, Physics at the Large Hadron Collider, along with Amitava Datta and Amitava Raychaudhuri and has contributed chapters to books edited by others.

== Selected bibliography ==
=== Books ===
- Amitava Datta; B. Mukhopadhyaya; A. Raychaudhuri (30 May 2010). Physics at the Large Hadron Collider. Springer Science & Business Media. ISBN 978-81-8489-295-6.

=== Chapters ===
- Rathin Adikari; Biswarup Mukhopadhyaya (30 November 1996). "Some Signals for a Light Neutralino". In K E Lassila; J Qiu; A Sommerer; G Valencia; K Whisnant; B-L Young (eds.). Particle Theory and Phenomenology: Proceedings of XVII International Kazimierz Meeting on Particle Physics and of the Madison Phenomenology Symposium. World Scientific. pp. 255–. ISBN 978-981-4547-00-0.

=== Articles ===
- Biswarup Mukhopadhyaya (2003). "Supersymmetry and neutrino mass". p. 18. arXiv:hep-ph/0301278.
- Nabarun Chakrabarty; Dilip Kumar Ghosh; Biswarup Mukhopadhyaya; Ipsita Saha (2015). "Dark matter, neutrino masses and high scale validity of an inert Higgs doublet model". Phys. Rev. D. 92 (1) 015002. arXiv:1501.03700. Bibcode:2015PhRvD..92a5002C. doi:10.1103/PhysRevD.92.015002. S2CID 118836453.
- Siddharth Dwivedi; Dilip Kumar Ghosh; Biswarup Mukhopadhyaya; Ambresh Shivaji (2015). "Constraints on CP-violating gauge-Higgs operators". Phys. Rev. D. 92 (9) 095015. arXiv:1505.05844. Bibcode:2015PhRvD..92i5015D. doi:10.1103/PhysRevD.92.095015. S2CID 119233910.
- Nabarun Chakrabarty; Biswarup Mukhopadhyaya; Soumitra SenGupta (2017). "Diphoton signal via Chern-Simons interaction in a warped geometry scenario". Phys. Rev. D. 95 (1) 015007. arXiv:1604.00885. Bibcode:2017PhRvD..95a5007C. doi:10.1103/PhysRevD.95.015007. S2CID 118436901.
- Nabarun Chakrabarty; Biswarup Mukhopadhyaya (2017). "High-scale validity of a two Higgs doublet scenario: predicting collider signals". Phys. Rev. D. 96 (3) 035028. arXiv:1702.08268. Bibcode:2017PhRvD..96c5028C. doi:10.1103/PhysRevD.96.035028. S2CID 118855115.

== See also ==
- Large Hadron Collider
- Higgs boson
