= Aditi Sen De =

Indian physicist (born 1974)

Prof. Aditi Sen De
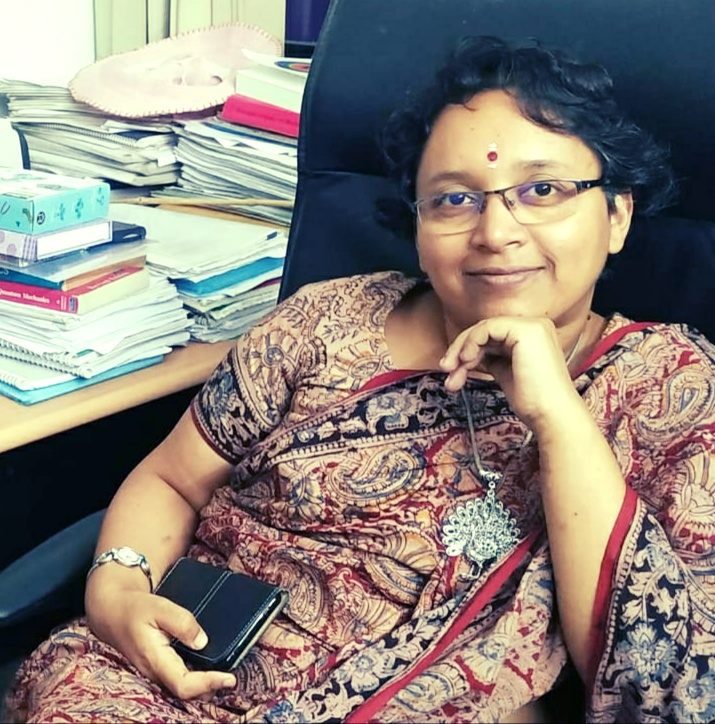
- Born: 1 October 1974; Kolkata, India
- Citizenship: India
- Education: Bethune College (B.Sc.), Rajabazar Science College (M.Sc.), University of Gdańsk (Ph.D.)
- Known for: Quantum information and computation
- Awards: 2012 Buti Foundation Award; 2018 Shanti Swarup Bhatnagar Prize; 2023 G. D. Birla Award for Scientific Research
- Scientific career
- Fields: Quantum information and computation; Condensed matter physics; Quantum optics
- Workplaces: Harish-Chandra Research Institute; Jawaharlal Nehru University
- Doctoral advisor: Marek Żukowski
- Website: http://www.hri.res.in/~aditi/

Aditi Sen De (born 1 October 1974 in Kolkata, India) is an Indian scientist, a professor in quantum information and computation group at the Harish-Chandra Research Institute, Prayagraj. She is known for her research on quantum information and computation, quantum communication including quantum cryptography, quantum optics and many-body physics. The Council of Scientific and Industrial Research awarded her the Shanti Swarup Bhatnagar Prize for Science and Technology for her contributions to physical sciences in 2018. She is the first female physicist to be given this honour. In 2022, she was elected as a member of Indian Academy of Sciences and Indian National Science Academy.

== Life and career ==
Aditi Sen De was born in Kolkata, India to Lakshmi Dey and Ajit Kumar Dey. She did her schooling at Sarada Ashrama Balika Bidyalaya, Kolkata, and completed her higher secondary from Sakhawat Memorial Govt. Girls High School, Kolkata in 1992. She joined Bethune College, University of Calcutta to obtain a Bachelor of Science with honours in Mathematics. Subsequently, she joined the Applied Mathematics department of the Rajabazar Science College, University of Calcutta. She received her master's degree in 1997, and after a short period of research work in India, moved to Gdańsk, Poland to work with Marek Żukowski at the University of Gdańsk, where she received her PhD in January 2004.

Following her doctoral studies she moved to Hannover, Germany as a Humboldt Research Fellow to work with Maciej Lewenstein at the Leibniz University. Thereafter, she joined ICFO - The Institute of Photonic Sciences at Barcelona, Spain. She won the Ramón y Cajal research fellowship during her time in Spain.

Upon returning to India in 2008, she joined the School of Physical Sciences at Jawaharlal Nehru University as an Assistant Professor in Physics, before moving to Harish-Chandra Research Institute, Allahabad in 2009, where she is currently a Professor in Physics. She has published more than 100 research articles in peer-reviewed journals.

She is married to fellow physicist Ujjwal Sen, who is also a Professor of Physics at Harish-Chandra Research Institute in Allahabad, India. They have a daughter, Anusyuta Sen.

== Research ==
Aditi Sen De started her research in the field of quantum information theory during her postgraduate studies in Kolkata and obtained her doctorate in 2004 at the University of Gdańsk. In collaboration with Marek Żukowski, Ryszard Horodecki, Paweł Horodecki, Michał Horodecki and Ujjwal Sen, she worked on entanglement theory, quantum cryptography and quantum communication.

She later worked with Maciej Lewenstein in Hannover and at ICFO - The Institute of Photonic Sciences near Barcelona. Her research includes quantum information, many-body quantum physics, quantum phase transitions using entanglement, quantum channels, security of quantum cryptography and quantification of quantum correlations.

In 2009, she co-founded the Quantum Information and Computation group at Harish-Chandra Research Institute along with Ujjwal Sen and Arun Kumar Pati.

== Awards and honours ==
In January 2022, she was elected to Indian Academy of Sciences. She was elected member of Indian National Science Academy in October 2022. The Council of Scientific and Industrial Research awarded her the Shanti Swarup Bhatnagar Prize in 2018. She is the first woman recipient of this Prize in the Physical Science category.

In 2012, she won the Buti Foundation Award. She has also received the Ramón y Cajal fellowship in Spain and the Humboldt Research Fellowship given by the Alexander von Humboldt Foundation in Germany.

== See also ==
- Quantum information
- Harish-Chandra Research Institute
