= Seyed E. Hasnain =

Indian bio-scientist and academic (born 1954)

Seyed Ehtesham Hasnain
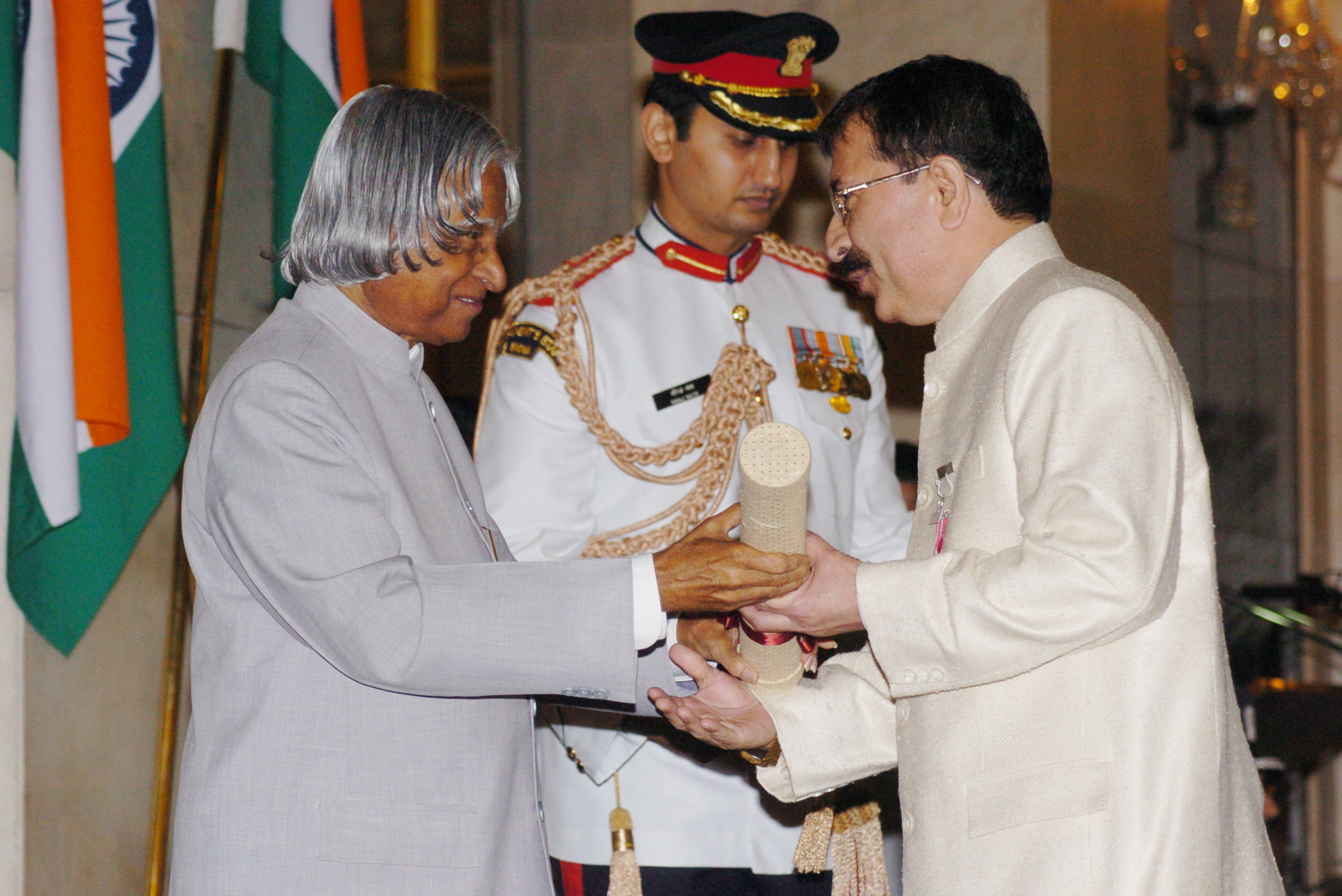
- President A.P.J. Abdul Kalam presenting Padma Shri to Hasnain in 2006
- Born: 13 April 1954 (age 72); Gaya, Bihar, India
- Education: JNU, New Delhi
- Awards: Order of Merit 1st Class of the Federal Republic of Germany 2014; G.D. Birla Award for Scientific Research 2001; Om Prakash Bhasin Award
- Scientific career
- Fields: Life sciences
- Workplaces: IIT Delhi (2011 – 2024)

Seyed Ehtesham Hasnain is an Indian academic and a Microbiologist. He is a recipient of the prestigious Padma Shri award.

== Biography ==
Hasnain spent several years at the Texas A&M University, U.S., and returned to India in 1987 to work as a staff scientist at the National Institute of Immunology (NII). Hasnain was appointed as the first director of Centre for DNA Fingerprinting and Diagnostics (CDFD) in February 1999. He served as the 7th vice-chancellor of University of Hyderabad from 2005 to 2011. He took charge as vice-chancellor of Jamia Hamdard, New Delhi on 2 September 2016 and served the office till 2021. An invited professor at the Indian Institute of Technology, Delhi (2011–2018), he is currently serving as one of the first 5 National Science Chair of SERB at IIT, Delhi. ––

== Distinctions ==
- Order of Merit of the Federal Republic of Germany
- Robert Koch Fellow (Visiting Scientist Programme), Germany
- Honorary Doctorate (2011) from Queen’s University, Belfast, U.K.
- Member, German Science Academy – Leopoldina, Germany
- Elected Fellow of the American Academy of Microbiology, USA
- Member, Scientific Advisory Council to the prime minister of India
- Member, Scientific Advisory Council to the Union Cabinet – Govt. of India
- Padma Shri Award from the president of India in 2006
- J. C. Bose National Fellow, University of Hyderabad
- Fellow of TWAS, Trieste, Italy
- Humboldt Research Award 2008 (The Alexander von Humboldt Foundation, Germany)
- Member of Aga Khan Foundation
- FICCI Award
- Ranbaxy Research Award
- Goyal Award
- Bhasin Award
