= Thanu Padmanabhan =

Indian physicist and cosmologist (1957–2021)

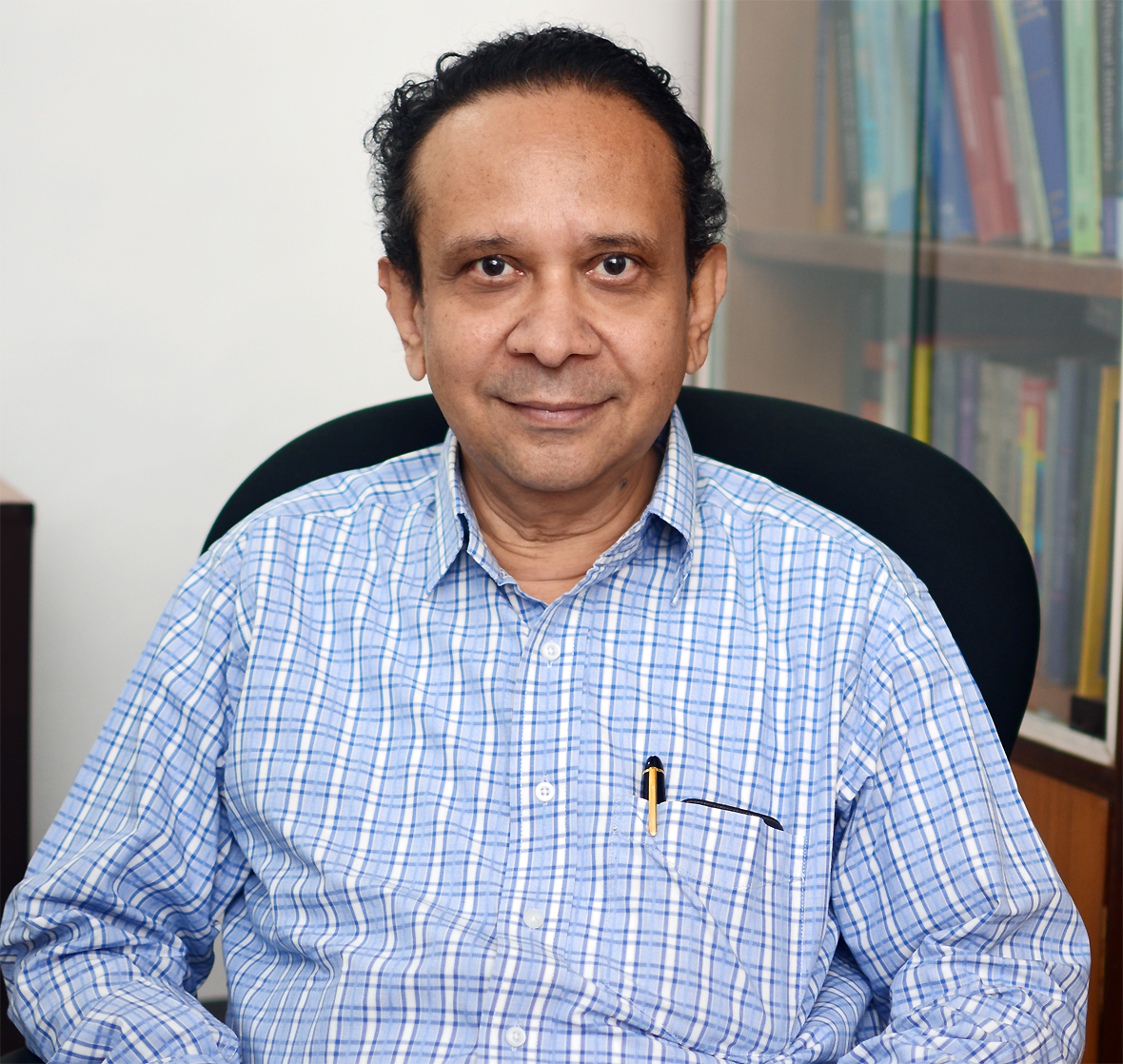
- Born: 10 March 1957; Trivandrum, Kerala, India
- Died: 17 September 2021 (aged 64); Pune, Maharashtra, India
- Education: • Kerala University, • Tata Institute of Fundamental Research
- Awards: • Shanti Swarup Bhatnagar Award (1996) • Padma Shri (2007) • Infosys Science Foundation Prize (2009)
- Scientific career
- Fields: Physics, astronomy
- Workplaces: Inter-University Centre for Astronomy and Astrophysics
- Doctoral advisor: Jayant Narlikar

Thanu Padmanabhan (10 March 1957 – 17 September 2021) was an Indian theoretical physicist and cosmologist whose research spanned a wide variety of topics in gravitation, structure formation in the universe and quantum gravity. He published nearly 300 papers and reviews in international journals and ten books in these areas. He made several contributions related to the analysis and modelling of dark energy in the universe and the interpretation of gravity as an emergent phenomenon. He was a distinguished professor at the Inter-University Centre for Astronomy and Astrophysics (IUCAA) at Pune, India.

== Life and career ==
Born to Thanu Iyer and Lakshmi on 10 March 1957 in Thiruvananthapuram (then Trivandrum), Padmanabhan attended school there. He earned his B.Sc. (1977) and M.Sc. (1979) in Physics from the University College Thiruvananthapuram, part of Kerala University. He published his first research paper (on general relativity) when he was still a B.Sc. student, at the age of 20. He joined the Tata Institute of Fundamental Research (TIFR) in Mumbai in 1979 for his Ph.D. and became a faculty member there in 1980. He held various faculty positions at TIFR from 1980 to 1992 and also spent a year (in 1986–87) at the Institute of Astronomy, Cambridge. He moved to Pune to work at the Inter-University Centre for Astronomy and Astrophysics in 1992 and served as its Dean, Core Academic Programmes, for 18 years (1997–2015).

Padmanabhan served as adjunct faculty of TIFR, the Harish-Chandra Research Institute (Allahabad), the Raman Research Institute (Bangalore) and the Indian Institute of Science, Education and Research (IISER, Pune) at different periods in his career. He was adjunct faculty of IISER, Mohali.

Padmanabhan served as chairman (2006–09) of the Time Allocation Committee of the Giant Meterwave Radio Telescope of NCRA. He was chairman (2008–11) of the Indian National Science Academy's National Committee which interfaces with the activities of the International Astronomical Union. In addition to advising the Government on policy issues, this also required him to coordinate the International Year of Astronomy 2009 activities in the country.

He was elected president of the Cosmology Commission (2009–2012) of the International Astronomical Union (IAU) and provided advice to IAU activities in this field. He was elected in 2011 as chairman of the Astrophysics Commission (2011–2014) of the International Union of Pure and Applied Physics (IUPAP) and co-ordinated the activities of IUPAP in this area. He was also a visiting faculty at many institutes including the California Institute of Technology, Princeton University, and a Sackler Distinguished Astronomer of the Institute of Astronomy, Cambridge. He was an elected fellow of The World Academy of Sciences and of all three National Academies of Science in India (the Indian National Science Academy, Indian Academy of Sciences, and the National Academy of Sciences, India).

In addition to his scientific research, Padmanabhan worked actively to popularize science and gave over 300 popular science lectures and authored more than 100 popular science articles. He did a comic strip serial The Story of Physics aimed at school children. Published by Vigyan Prasar (New Delhi), it was translated into half a dozen regional Indian languages and made available at an affordable price at Indian schools. To commemorate the International Year of Astronomy (IYA) in 2009, he published (with J. V. Narlikar and Samir Dhurde) the IYA Astronomical Diary 2009, which comprises 53 illustrated pages of astronomical information. In 2019, he co-authored with Vasanthi Padmanabhan The Dawn of Science (published by Springer).

He was married to Vasanthi Padmanabhan, who has a Ph.D. in astrophysics from TIFR, Mumbai, and they had one daughter, Hamsa Padmanabhan, who herself has a Ph.D. in astrophysics from IUCAA, Pune.

He died on 17 September 2021 at the age of 64 after a heart attack at his residence in Pune. A tribute article written by his former graduate students and post-doctoral fellows and physics friends from college days has been posted on the Physics arXiv.

== Key awards and distinctions ==
Padmanabhan received several national and international awards including:

- Kerala Shastra Puraskaram, 2021
- M. P. Birla Memorial Award, 2019
- Homi Bhabha Lecturer at UK (IoP-IPA award), 2014
- TWAS Prize in Physics (2011)
- Infosys Science Foundation Prize for Physical Sciences (2009)
- J. C. Bose National Fellowship (Science and Engineering Research Board, DST) (2008)
- INSA Vainu Bappu Gold Medal (2007)
- Padma Shri (from the President of India, 2007)
- Miegunah Fellowship Award (University of Melbourne, Australia, 2004)
- Homi Bhabha Fellowship (2003)
- G. D. Birla Award for Scientific Research (2003)
- Al-Khwarizmi International Award (2002)
- The Millennium Medal (CSIR, 2000)
- Shanti Swarup Bhatnagar Award (1996)
- The Birla Science Prize (1991)
- Young Scientist Award, (Indian National Science Academy) (1984)

His research work won prizes nine times (in 1984, 2002, 2003, 2006, 2008, 2012, 2014, 2018 and 2020) including the First Prize in 2008 from the Gravity Research Foundation, USA.

A Stanford study in 2020, listing top scientists in different fields, ranked Padmanabhan as 24th in the world in his research area.

== Research ==
Padmanabhan's research was on the fields of gravitation and cosmology which includes quantum gravity and nature of dark energy. During 2002–2015, he provided a clear interpretation of gravity as an emergent phenomenon (like elasticity or fluid dynamics) and showed that this paradigm extends to a wide class of theories of gravitation including, but not limited to, general relativity. Padmanabhan could show that several peculiar aspects of classical gravitational theories find natural interpretations in this approach. Such an interpretation also provides a novel solution to the cosmological constant problem. He gave two lectures at the Oxford–Cambridge collaborative conference on "Cosmology and the Constants of Nature" about this.

Popular (non-technical) descriptions of Padmanabhan's research have been published in Scientific American (India), and a more technical description is available in an article from the Gravity Research Foundation in 2008, that describes his First Prize work. Another popular article about his work which appeared in a German science magazine along with the English translation. An interview of Padmanabhan by George Musser about his work can be found here.

In the earlier part of Padmanabhan's career (1980–2001), he made important contributions to quantum cosmology, structure formation in the universe and statistical mechanics of gravitating systems. In the 1980s, he came up with an interpretation of the Planck length as the 'zero-point length' of the spacetime based on very general considerations. This result, established by theoretical considerations and well-chosen thought experiments, finds an echo in more recent results in several other candidate models for quantum gravity. He developed the complex path method (in 1998) to study black hole thermodynamics which was a precursor to the 'tunneling paradigm' that became quite popular later on. He was a recognized authority in the subject of the statistical mechanics of gravitating systems and was a pioneer in the systematic application of these concepts to study the gravitational clustering in an expanding universe. He was invited to lecture twice at the Les Houches Schools (in 2002 and 2008) to a broader community about this subject.

In November 2016, Padmanabhan published research studies advocating a new paradigm shift in understanding gravity. A key question in quantum gravity lies in understanding the primordial, pre-geometric phase of the universe, from which the classical, geometric phase described by Einstein's equations emerges along with the notions of space and time themselves. Padmanabhan introduced the notion of Cosmic Information (called 'CosmIn'), which allows these two phases to be connected in a fascinating manner. CosmIn, which is a conserved quantity, measures the total information transferred from the quantum gravitational phase to the classical phase of the universe. Quantum gravitational considerations advocate an astonishingly simple value for CosmIn: 4π, the number of information 'bits' on the surface of a sphere of unit radius. Using these considerations, CosmIn was able to relate the numerical value of the cosmological constant – possibly the deepest unsolved problem in theoretical physics today – to the energy scale at which the universe made the quantum-to-classical transition. This is the first time that a model with no adjustable parameters is able to provide a holistic explanation for both these observations, which has far-reaching implications for the quantum structure of spacetime. A non-technical account covering this latest development in Padmanabhan's research was published in the magazine Nautilus.

== Publications ==
=== Books authored ===
Padmanabhan authored several advanced level textbooks. In addition, he authored several popular-level science books.

- The Dawn of Science: Glimpses from History for the Curious Mind, Springer, Heidelberg (2019)
- Quantum Field Theory: The Why, What and How, Springer, Heidelberg (2016)
- Sleeping Beauties in Theoretical Physics: 26 Surprising Insights, Springer, Heidelberg (2015)
- Gravitation: Foundations and Frontiers, Cambridge University Press, Cambridge, (2010)
- An Invitation to Astrophysics, World Scientific, Singapore, (2006)
- Theoretical Astrophysics - Volume III : Galaxies and Cosmology, Cambridge University Press, Cambridge, (2002)
- Theoretical Astrophysics - Volume II : Stars and Stellar Systems, Cambridge University Press, Cambridge, (2001)
- Theoretical Astrophysics - Volume I : Astrophysical Processes, Cambridge University Press, Cambridge, (2000) - Review
- Cosmology and Astrophysics through Problems, Cambridge University Press, Cambridge, (1996) Review
- Structure Formation in the Universe, Cambridge University Press, Cambridge, (1993) - Review
- Gravity, Gauge Theories and Quantum Cosmology, (co-authored with J.V. Narlikar), Reidel (1986)
- Quantum Themes: The Charms of the Microworld, World Scientific, Singapore, (2009)
- After the First Three Minutes - The Story of Our Universe, Cambridge University Press, Cambridge, (1998)

=== Selected technical review articles ===
- Gravity and Quantum Theory: Domains of Conflict and Contact, Invited Review, IJMPD (2020) 2030001
- Do We really Understand the Cosmos?, Comptes Rendus Physique, 18 (3–4): 275–291, arXiv:1611.03505, Bibcode:2017CRPhy..18..275P. doi:10.1016/j.crhy.2017.02.001
- Emergent Gravity Paradigm: Recent Progress, Mod. Phys. Letters A, 30, 1540007 (2015)
- Statistical Mechanics of Gravitating Systems, Physics Reports, Vol.188, pp. 285–362 (1990)
- Cosmological Constant - the Weight of the Vacuum, Physics Reports, Vol. 380, pp. 235–320 (2003)
- Thermodynamical Aspects of Gravity: New insights, Reports in Progress of Physics, 73, 046901 (2010)
- Lessons from Classical Gravity about the Quantum Structure of Spacetime, J. Phys. Conf. Ser., 306:012001 (2011)
- Physical significance of Planck length, Annals of Physics, Vol. 165, pp. 38, (1985)

=== Selected popular science articles ===
- The Universe Began With a Big Melt, Not a Big Bang, Nautilus, Issue 53, 5 October 2017
- Grappling with Gravity, Scientific American India, January 2011, 30-35
- The IYA Astronomical Diary - 2009, 53 illustrated pages of astronomical information, celebrating the International Year of Astronomy (2009) (with J.V.Narlikar and Samir Dhurde).
- The Story of Physics, a comic strip serialised in the magazine Science Age, from Sept. 1984 to Dec. 1986; published in book form by Vigyan Prasar, New Delhi, (2002) and now translated into several Indian regional languages.
