= Nibir Mandal =

Indian geologist

- Born: 6 November 1963 (age 62); Raghunathganj, Jangipur, Murshidabad, West Bengal, India
- Education: Jadavpur University; Hokkaido University; ETH Zurich
- Known for: Studies on the evolution of geological structures
- Awards: 1992 INSA Young Scientist Medal; 2005 S. S. Bhatnagar Prize; 2013 G. D. Birla Award
- Scientific career
- Fields: Tectonics; Structural geology; Geodynamics
- Workplaces: Jadavpur University

Nibir Mandal (born 6 November 1963) is an Indian structural geologist and a professor of Geological Sciences at Jadavpur University. He is known for his studies on the evolution of geological structures and is an elected fellow of Indian Academy of Sciences, and the Indian National Science Academy. The Council of Scientific and Industrial Research, the apex agency of the Government of India for scientific research, awarded him the Shanti Swarup Bhatnagar Prize for Science and Technology, one of the highest Indian science awards for his contributions to Earth, Atmosphere, Ocean and Planetary Sciences in 2005. (Note: Long link - please select award year to see details)

== Biography ==
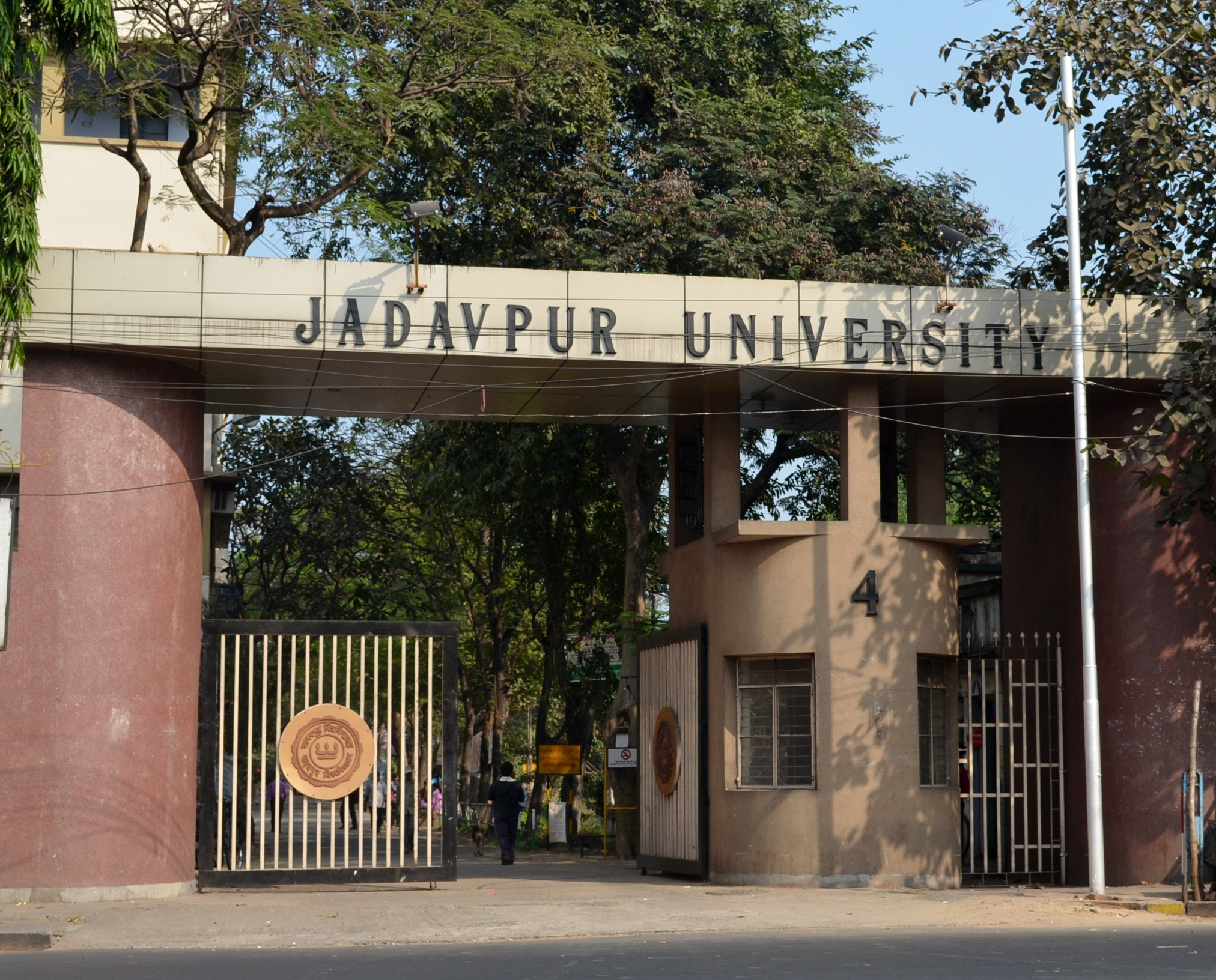
Jadavpur University

Nibir Mandal, born on 6 November 1963 at Jangipur in the Murshidabad district of the Indian state of West Bengal to Mahadev Mandal and Renuka, completed his graduate studies in science at Jadavpur University in 1984 and obtained a master's degree from the same university in 1987. He continued at the university for his doctoral studies as a CSIR research fellow, and after securing a PhD in 1991, joined Allahabad University in 1992 as a lecturer but moved back to his alma mater as a lecturer the same year. He has been serving the university since then, holding the positions of senior lecturer and reader before becoming a professor of the Department of Geology, a position he holds to date. In between, he did his post-doctoral studies at Hokkaido University as a JSPS visiting scientist and at ETH Zurich as a post-doctoral fellow. He also serves as an adjunct professor at the department of earth sciences of the Indian Institute of Technology Kanpur.

== Legacy ==
Mandal is known to have done researches on the evolution of geological structures. Through his experimental and theoretical work, he is reported to have proposed a theory of particle motion associated with faults undergoing both translational and rotational movement. His studies have been documented in several peer-reviewed articles; (Note: Please see Selected bibliography section) ResearchGate, an online repository of scientific articles, has listed 74 of them. Besides, he has also contributed chapters to books edited by others.

== Awards and honors ==
Mandal received the Young Scientist Medal of the Indian National Science Academy in 1992. The Council of Scientific and Industrial Research awarded him the Shanti Swarup Bhatnagar Prize, one of the highest Indian science awards in 2005. He was elected as a fellow by the Indian Academy of Sciences also in 2006 and he became a fellow of the Indian National Science Academy in 2010. Three years later, he received the 2012 G. D. Birla Award for Scientific Research of the K. K. Birla Foundation.

== Selected bibliography ==
=== Chapters in books ===
- Alok Krishna Gupta, Nibir Mandal (6 October 2011). Physics and Chemistry of the Earth's Interior: Crust, Mantle and Core. Springer Science & Business Media. pp. 41–. ISBN 978-1-4419-0346-4.
- S. Sengupta, Nibir Mandal (6 December 2012). Evolution of Geological Structures in Micro- to Macro-scales. Springer Science & Business Media. pp. 19–. ISBN 978-94-011-5870-1.
- Soumyajit Mukherjee; Kieran F. Mulchrone (21 December 2015). Ductile Shear Zones: From Micro- to Macro-scales. John Wiley & Sons. pp. 5–. ISBN 978-1-118-84496-0.

=== Articles ===
- Nibir Mandal, Atin Kumar Mitra, Santanu Misra, Chandan Chakraborty (2006). "Is the outcrop topology of dolerite dikes of the Precambrian Singhbhum Craton fractal?". Journal of Earth System Science. 115 (6) (published December 2006): 643–660. Bibcode:2006JESS..115..643M. doi:10.1007/s12040-006-0002-2.
- Nishant Kumar, Shamik Sarkar, Nibir Mandal (2010). "Numerical modeling of flow patterns around subducting slabs in a viscoelastic medium and its implications in the lithospheric stress analysis". Journal of the Geological Society of India. 75 (1) (published January 2010): 98–109. Bibcode:2010JGSI...75...98K. doi:10.1007/s12594-010-0027-7. S2CID 73619587.
- Nibir Mandal, Krishna Hara Chakravarty, Kajaljyoti Borah, S. S. Rai (2012). "Is a cation ordering transition of the Mg-Fe olivine phase in the mantle responsible for the shallow mantle seismic discontinuity beneath the Indian Craton?". Journal of Geophysical Research. 117 (B12) (published December 2012): a. Bibcode:2012JGRB..11712304M. doi:10.1029/2012JB009225.
- Fernando O. Marques, Nibir Mandal, Rui Taborda, José V. Antunes, Santanu Bose (2014). "The behaviour of deformable and non-deformable inclusions in viscous flow". Earth-Science Reviews. 134 (published July 2014): 16–69. Bibcode:2014ESRv..134...16M. doi:10.1016/j.earscirev.2014.03.007.
- Urmi Dutta, Amiya Baruah1, Nibir Mandal (2016). "Role of source-layer tilts in the axi-asymmetric growth of diapirs triggered by a Rayleigh-Taylor instability". Geophys. J. Int. 208 (2) (published July 2016): 1814–1830. doi:10.1093/gji/ggw244.
- Ritabrata Dasgupta, Nibir Mandal (2022). "Role of double-subduction dynamics in the topographic evolution of the Sunda Plate". Geophys. J. Int. (published July 2022). 230 (1): 696-713. doi.org/10.1093/gji/ggac025
- Uddalak Biswas, Manaska Mukhopadhyay, & Nibir Mandal (2023). Fractal analysis of anisotropic shear-fracture roughness from rocks and analogue laboratory models: A new approach for heterogeneous-slip characterization. International Journal of Rock Mechanics and Mining Sciences, 169, 105432.https://doi.org/10.1016/j.ijrmms.2023.105432

== See also ==
- Indian Shield
- Diapir
