= Sanjeev Galande =

Indian biologist (born 1967)

- Born: 20 September 1967 (age 58); Pune, Maharashtra, India
- Education: Savitribai Phule Pune University; Indian Institute of Science; Lawrence Berkeley National Laboratory
- Known for: Studies on higher-order chromatin architecture
- Awards: 2006 N-BIOS Prize; 2010 Shanti Swarup Bhatnagar Prize; 2014 G. D. Birla Award
- Scientific career
- Fields: Chromatin biology; Epigenetics
- Workplaces: National Centre for Cell Science; Indian Institute of Science Education and Research, Pune; Savitribai Phule Pune University

Sanjeev Anant Galande (born 20 September 1967) is an Indian cell biologist, epigeneticist, academic, former chair of biology and the dean of research and development at the Indian Institute of Science Education and Research, Pune. He heads the Laboratory of Chromatin Biology and Epigenetics (Sanjeev Galande Lab) at the Indian Institute of Science Education and Research, Pune. He is the founder of the Centre of Excellence in Epigenetics at IISER Pune and is known for his studies on higher-order chromatin architecture and how it influences spatiotemporal changes in gene expression. He is an elected fellow of the Indian National Science Academy and the Indian Academy of Sciences and a recipient of the National Bioscience Award for Career Development of the Department of Biotechnology. The Council of Scientific and Industrial Research, the apex agency of the Government of India for scientific research, awarded him the Shanti Swarup Bhatnagar Prize for Science and Technology, one of the highest Indian science awards, in 2010, for his contributions to biological sciences.

== Biography ==
Sanjeev Galande, born on 20 September 1967 in Pune, in the western Indian state of Maharashtra, did his master's degree in biochemistry (MSc) at the Savitribai Phule Pune University before obtaining his doctoral studies from the Indian Institute of Science in 1996. He moved to the US the same year to join the Lawrence Berkeley National Laboratory to complete his postdoctoral studies on the role of MAR-binding proteins in tumorigenesis in 2001 and on his return to India, he joined National Centre for Cell Science (NCCS) as a senior scientist. He headed the Sanjeev Galande Laboratory at the NCCS till 2010 when he shifted to the Indian Institute of Science Education and Research, Pune as a professor and established the Centre of Excellence in Epigenetics (CoEE) there. He heads the Laboratory of Chromatin Biology and Epigenetics where he hosts a number of researchers who focus their studies on evolution of epigenetic mechanisms using multiple model systems. He also serves as an adjunct faculty at Savitribai Phule Pune University.

== Legacy ==
Galande's early researches during his doctoral studies were on MAR-binding proteins and carcinogenesis but later he shifted his focus to cell-type specific patterns of gene expression and how chromatin levels influence them which was the theme of his research at NCCS. His team demonstrated how cellular signaling pathways impact the chromatin levels. After his move to IISER, Pune, he started working on epigenetic regulation on various substrata viz. yeast, Caenorhabditis elegans (round worm), Drosophila (fruit flies), Zebrafish and humans, using them as biological model systems. His team investigate biological processes such as transcription, gene regulation, cell proliferation, self-renewal and regeneration and their interrelations for which they employ genetic, biochemical, molecular and computational approaches. His studies are reported to have assisted in widening our understanding of the development and differentiation of T cells and the impact of Wnt signaling pathways in the process. He is involved in three running projects; Intergenerational programming of diabesity in offspring of women with Gestational Diabetes Mellitus (InDiaGDM), Role of chromatin organizer SATB1 in T cell development and differentiation and The role of Chromatin reorganisers in X inactivation.

Galande has detailed his research in a number of articles (Note: Please see Selected bibliography section) and ResearchGate, an online article repository has listed 87 of them. He has mentored several scholars at his laboratories in NCCS and IISER and coordinated the National Research Scholars Meet in Life Sciences in 2005. He has also established a number of multidisciplinary academic programs at IISER which covers such topics as biochemistry, molecular biology, bioinformatics, cell biology, proteomics, and genomics and has participated in several seminars on these topics.

== Awards and honors ==
Galande's contributions to the biological sciences earned him the National Bioscience Award for Career Development of the Department of Biotechnology (DBT) in 2006. The same year, DBT selected him for the Swarnajayanthi Fellowship for life sciences. In 2010, he was awarded the Shanti Swarup Bhatnagar Prize for Science and Technology, one of the highest Indian science awards, by the Council of Scientific and Industrial Research and the Wellcome Trust chose him for the Senior Research Fellowships in Basic Biomedical Science. He received the 2014 G. D. Birla Award for Scientific Research of the K. K. Birla Foundation in 2015. He is an elected fellow of two major Indian science academies, Indian Academy of Sciences (2010) and Indian National Science Academy (2012).

== Selected bibliography ==
- Keisuke Sako; Saurabh J Pradhan; Vanessa Barone; Alvaro Inglés-Prieto; Patrick Müller; Verena Ruprecht; Daniel Capek; Sanjeev Galande; Harald Janovjak; Carl-Philipp Heisenberg (July 2016). "Optogenetic Control of Nodal Signaling Reveals a Temporal Pattern of Nodal Signaling Regulating Cell Fate Specification during Gastrulation". Cell Reports. 16 (3): 866–877. doi:10.1016/j.celrep.2016.06.036. PMID 27396324.
- Anupam Sawant; Progya P Mukherjee; Rahul Kumar Jangid; Sanjeev Galande; Seergazhi G Srivatsan (May 2016). "Clickable UTP Analog for the Posttranscriptional Chemical Labeling and Imaging of RNA". Organic and Biomolecular Chemistry. 14 (24): 5832–5842. doi:10.1039/C6OB00576D. PMID 27173127.
- Satyajeet Khare; Prachi Katre; Sanjeev Galande (January 2016). "Epigenetic Regulation of Islet Development and Regeneration". Pancreatic Islet Biology. Stem Cell Biology and Regenerative Medicine. pp. 83–109. doi:10.1007/978-3-319-45307-1_4. ISBN 978-3-319-45305-7.
- Puli Chandramouli Reddy; Ishani Sinha; Ashwin Kelkar; Farhat Habib; Saurabh J Pradhan; Raman Sukumar; Sanjeev Galande (December 2015). "Comparative sequence analyses of genome and transcriptome reveal novel transcripts and variants in the Asian elephant Elephas maximus". Journal of Biosciences. 40 (5): 891–907. doi:10.1007/s12038-015-9580-y. PMID 26648035. S2CID 12472801.
- Pusalkar, Madhavi; Suri, Deepika; Kelkar, Ashwin; Bhattacharya, Amrita; Galande, Sanjeev; Vaidya, Vidita A. (September 2015). "Early stress evokes dysregulation of histone modifiers in the medial prefrontal cortex across the life span". Developmental Psychobiology. 58 (2): 198–210. doi:10.1002/dev.21365. PMID 26395029.
- Anupam A. Sawant; Arun A. Tanpure1; Progya P. Mukherjee; Soumitra Athavale; Ashwin Kelkar; Sanjeev Galande; Seergazhi G. Srivatsan (September 2015). "A versatile toolbox for posttranscriptional chemical labeling and imaging of RNA". Nucleic Acids Research. 44 (2): e16. doi:10.1093/nar/gkv903. PMC 4737177. PMID 26384420.
- Rafeeq Mir; Saurabh J Pradhan; P Patil; R Mulherkar; Sanjeev Galande (July 2015). "Wnt/β-catenin signaling regulated SATB1 promotes colorectal cancer tumorigenesis and progression". Oncogene. 35 (13): 1679–1691. doi:10.1038/onc.2015.232. PMID 26165840. S2CID 19966486.

== See also ==
- Wnt signaling pathway
- Gene expression
- Epigenetic regulation
- T cell
