= Trilochan Pradhan =

Indian scientist (1929–2021)

- Born: 3 January 1929; Ghanasalia, Nayagarh district, Odisha, British India
- Died: 4 December 2021 (aged 92); Bhubaneswar, Odisha, India
- Education: Ph.D. (University of Chicago)
- Alma mater: Ravenshaw College, Benaras Hindu University, University of Chicago
- Known for: Scientist
- Awards: Padma Bhusan

Trilochan Pradhan (3 January 1929 – 4 December 2021) was an Indian scientist.

== Career ==
Pradhan obtained his PhD from the University of Chicago in 1956. He headed the Theoretical Nuclear Physics Division at the Saha Institute of Nuclear Physics from 1964 to 1974, was the founding director of the Institute of Physics, Bhubaneswar from 1974 to 1989 and served as the vice chancellor of Utkal University from 1989 to 1991.

== Books ==
- The Photon, (Nova Science Publishers, New York), 2001
- Quantum Mechanics (University Press of Hyderabad)
- Electron Capture by Protons Passing through Hydrogen

== Awards ==
- Kalinga Ratna, 2018
- Kalinga Samman, 2014
- Padma Bhusan, 1990
- Meghnad Saha Award, 1980
