= Marek Żukowski =

Polish physicist (born 1952)

- Born: December 11, 1952 (age 73); Gdynia, Polish People's Republic
- Education: University of Gdańsk
- Known for: entanglement swapping quantum interferometry
- Awards: Copernicus Award (2014); Prize of the Foundation for Polish Science (2013)
- Scientific career
- Fields: Theoretical physics

Marek Żukowski (born 11 December 1952) is a Polish theoretical physicist and lecturer at the University of Gdańsk. He specializes in quantum mechanics, his area of interest in particular concerns the Bell's theorem and quantum interferometry.

== Life and career ==
He was born on 11 December 1952, in Gdynia, Polish People's Republic. He is a graduate of the Faculty of Mathematics, Physics and Chemistry of the University of Gdańsk. After meeting Anton Zeilinger, he developed an interest in information theory and quantum interferometry. Their first joint scientific paper was published in 1991, later they created a series of international projects called Quantum Optics and Quantum Information. Żukowski also collaborates with Harald Weinfurter from Munich, Jian-Wei Pan from Hefei and Mohamed Bourenanne from Stockholm, as well as the National University of Singapore. He is also involved in a number of European projects such as SCALA and Qubit Applications.

He has been working at the University of Gdańsk since 1976. He was appointed head of the Department of Quantum Optics at the Institute of Theoretical Physics and Astrophysics in 1995, and was the Institute's director from 2005 to 2018. He has been a visiting professor at a number of universities abroad including the University of Innsbruck, the University of Vienna, Tsinghua University in Beijing and the Chinese Academy of Sciences. Between 2010 and 2018, he was a member of the Council of the National Science Centre. He is the 2013 laureate of the Prize of the Foundation for Polish Science in the mathematical, physical and engineering sciences, for his contributions into the research on multiphoton entangled states, which resulted in the formulation of information causality as a principle of physics.

== Private life ==
He is the son of graphic designer Halszka Żukowska and grandson of inventor, hydrotechnician and Member of the 1st Term Parliament of the Polish People's Republic, professor Romuald Cebertowicz.

== Awards ==
- Johannes Hevelius Science Prize of the City of Gdańsk (2016)
- Copernicus Award (2014)
- Prize of the Foundation for Polish Science (2013)
- Minister of National Education Prize (2007, 2000, 1994, 1983)

== Selected publications ==
- Event-Ready Deterctors Bell Experiment via Entanglement Swapping (Żukowski, Zeilinger, Horne, Ekert, Phys. Rev. Lett. 71, 4297, 1993
- Violations of Local Realism by Two Entangled N-Dimensional Systems Are Stronger than for Two Qubits (Kaszlikowski, Gnaciński, Żukowski, Miklaszewski, Zeilinger, Phys. Rev. Lett. 85, 4418, 2000)
- Bell’s Theorem for General N-Qubit State (Brukner, Żukowski, Phys. Rev. Lett. 88, 240401, 2002)
