= E. S. Raja Gopal =

Indian condensed matter physicist

- Born: 12 May 1936; Salem, Madras Presidency, British India
- Died: 15 November 2018 (aged 82); Bengaluru, Karnataka, India
- Education: University of Madras; Indian Institute of Science; Burdwan University; University of Oxford
- Known for: Studies on rectilinear diameter law, Thermodynamics
- Awards: 1978 Shanti Swarup Bhatnagar Prize; 1980 ASI Sir C.V. Raman Award; 1984 NRDC Inventions Promotions Award; 1994 ASI Dr. S Bhagavantam Award; 1993 INSA Homi Jehangir Bhabha Medal; 2004 BRSI Life Time Achievement Medal; 2005 ISOI Annual Award; 2008 IISc Distinguished Alumnus Award
- Scientific career
- Fields: Condensed matter physics
- Workplaces: Indian Institute of Science; National Physical Laboratory; Council of Scientific and Industrial Research
- Doctoral advisor: R. S. Krishnan; Kurt Mendelssohn

Erode Subramanian Raja Gopal (12 May 1936 – 15 November 2018) was an Indian condensed matter physicist, a former professor at the Indian Institute of Science and a former director of the National Physical Laboratory of India. Known for his research in condensed matter physics, Raja Gopal was an elected fellow of all the three major Indian science academies – the Indian National Science Academy, the National Academy of Sciences, India, and the Indian Academy of Sciences – as well as a member of the Institute of Physics. He was a former CSIR emeritus scientist, an alumnus of the University of Oxford and the author of three reference texts in condensed matter physics. The Council of Scientific and Industrial Research, the apex agency of the Government of India for scientific research, awarded him the Shanti Swarup Bhatnagar Prize for Science and Technology, one of the highest Indian science awards, for his contributions to Physical Sciences in 1978.

== Biography ==
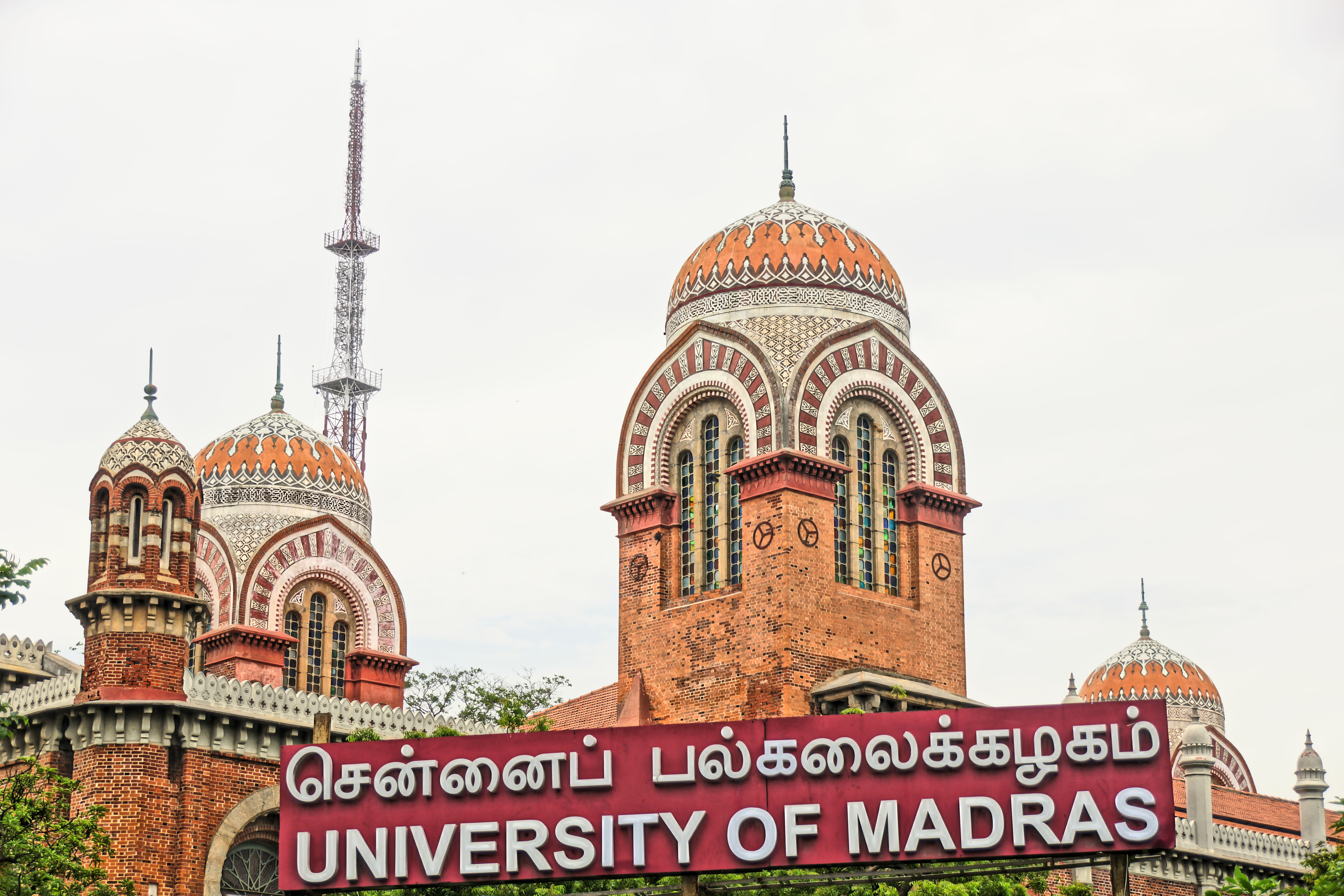
University of Madras

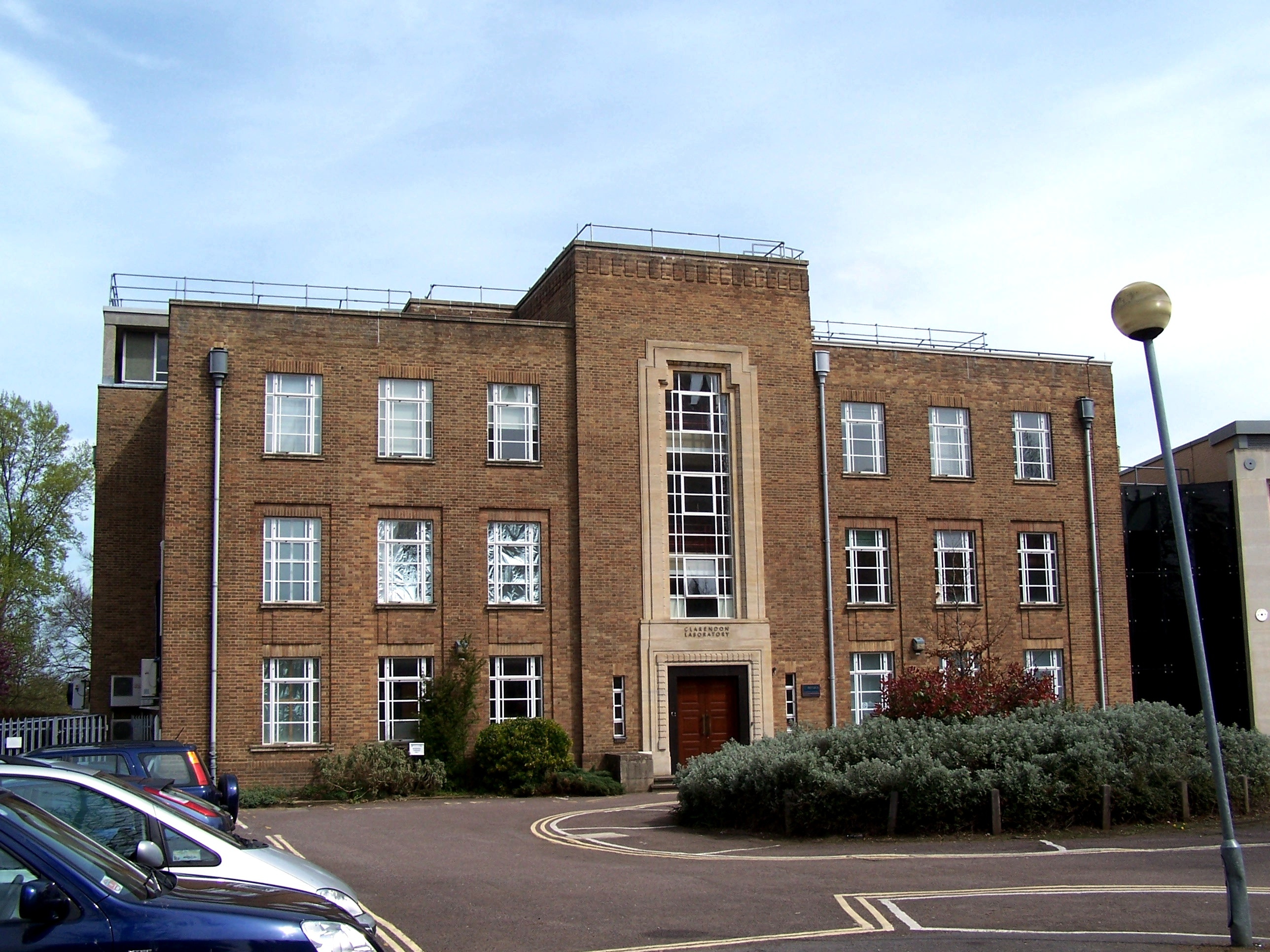
Clarendon Laboratory

Born on 12 May 1936 at Salem, Tamil Nadu, E. S. Raja Gopal did his pre-graduate studies at St. Joseph's College, Tiruchirappalli and after earning a BSc (hons) from the University of Madras, he continued at the university to complete an MA in physics in 1956 and a second master's degree by research (MSc) in 1958. Subsequently, he moved to the neighboring state of Karnataka to pursue his doctoral studies at the Indian Institute of Science and secured a PhD in 1961 under the guidance of distinguished experimental physicist R. S. Krishnan. He then undertook post-doctoral studies at the Clarendon Laboratory of the Department of Physics, University of Oxford under Kurt Mendelssohn. Upon his return to India in 1964, he joined Indian Institute of Science (IISc) as a CSIR pool officer at the department of physics, to commence an association which would last over 35 years. He held several positions at IISc during this period, where he became an assistant professor in 1965, a full professor in 1969 and the dean of the faculty of science in 1976. He chaired the department of physics during 1977–80 and Regional Sophisticated Instrumentation Centre (present-day NMR Research Centre) from 1983 to 1989.

In 1991, Raja Gopal was appointed the director of National Physical Laboratory of India (NPL) but he continued his association with IISc as the MSIL chair professor from 1991 to 1994. (Note: MSIL Chair professorship is an endowment from Mysore Sales International Limited, a Government of Karnataka undertaking) He headed NPL till his retirement from official service in 1997 after which he remained with the laboratory as a CSIR emeritus scientist for a while before returning to Bengaluru to rejoin IISc holding the CSIR position and became an emeritus professor of the department of physics, a position he held until his death. At IISc, he held the position of a senior scientist of the Indian National Science Academy from 2001 to 2006 and was an honorary scientist of INSA since then.

Raja Gopal, who was a resident of Malleswaram in Bengaluru, died on 15 November 2018.

== Legacy ==
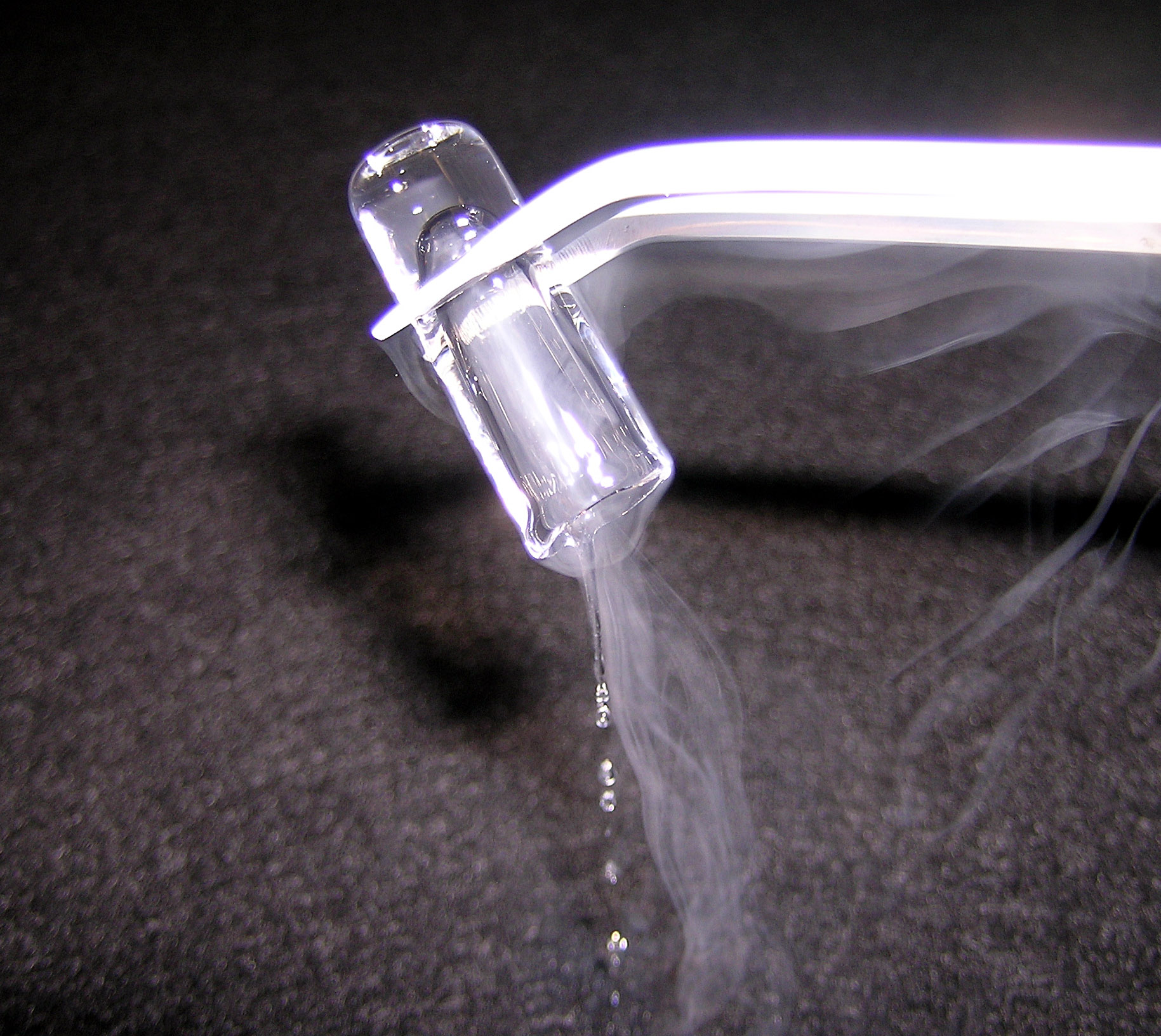
Phase transition of Argon ice – transitions from solid to liquid to gas

Raja Gopal has worked on various aspects of condensed matter physics especially critical point phenomena which assisted in understanding the Law of the Rectilinear Diameter and its breakdown. He studied electrical resistivity in relation to non-equilibrium critical point phenomena and elucidated its unusual behavior. His studies of the liquid systems and disordered materials with regard to their phase transitions returned precision measurements which helped in observing particle-hole asymmetry in the liquid-gas critical phenomena in binary liquid mixtures for the first time. Percolation threshold in covalently bonded chalcogenide glasses through precise measurements was another of his notable findings. He has published his research findings by way of over 250 articles (Note: Please see Selected bibliography section) of which 167 have been listed in the article repository of the Indian Academy of Sciences. He has also written three books: High Temperature Superconductors, Specific Heats at Low Temperatures, and Statistical Mechanics and Properties of Matter: Theory and Applications and has supervised the studies of over 60 master's and doctoral scholars.

Raja Gopal, the editor-in-chief of the Journal of the Instrument Society of India, has also served as the chief editor of two science journals; Pramana journal of Indian Academy of Sciences (1984–89) and the Journal of the Acoustical Society of India (1982–87) and was a member of the editorial advisory boards of the Indian Journal of Cryogenics and the Indian Journal of Physics. He served as the principal investigator of Design & development of a high pressure high temperature system and application, a project of the Defence Research and Development Organization (DRDO) and has been a member of the committee of conveners of the IISc project to prepare an archives of the activities of the institute through 100 years. He was a member of Asia Pacific Academy of Materials (APAM), an honorary member of the Indian Cryogenics Council, a life member of the Indian Physics Association as well as Acoustical Society of India and a former council member of the International Bureau of Weights and Measures (1993–2003). He served as the president of the Indian Cryogenics Council (1986–88), Acoustical Society of India (1991–92), Indian Society for Mass Spectrometry (1992–95), Ultrasonics Society of India (1993–98), Instrument Society of India (1993–97) (Note: Sitting council member) and Metrology Society of India (1994–98) and as the vice president of the Indian Physics Association (1985–87) as well as the Acoustical Society of India (1989–90). He has been involved with the organization of science workshops such as Emerging Trends in Physical and Mathematical Sciences in connection with the IISc centenary conference of 2008 as well as National Workshop of preserving our scientific heritage organized by the Indian Institute of Astrophysics in January 2008. The international conferences he has been associated with as an advisory board member included CSIR-CEERI International Conference on Advanced Electronic Systems (ICAES-2013), International Conference on Sustainable Energy Technologies (ICSET 20414) organized by a consortium which comprised University of Exeter, University of Oslo, Research Council of Norway, Western Norway University of Applied Sciences and The Michelsen Center, Biennial international conference on cryogenic engineering (ICEC 26 – ICMC 2016), 9th International Conference on Advances in Metrology – 2016 and International Educators Meet 2016 of Anna University. He has also delivered a number of keynote addresses or invited speeches and the oration on Global Warming: A Scientist Looks at the Reality and the Myths at the Indian Institute of Science Education and Research, Thiruvananthapuram on 1 April 2017 features among them.

== Awards and honors ==
The Council of Scientific and Industrial Research awarded Raja Gopal the Shanti Swarup Bhatnagar Prize, one of the highest Indian science awards in 1978. When the Acoustical Society of India (ASI) instituted an annual award for articles published in its official journal in 1980, an article co-written by Raja Gopal, Ultrasonic study of chromatin and DNA solution at High Pressure up to 3 kbar, earned the inaugural Sir C.V. Raman Award; ASI would honor him again with the 1993–94 Dr. S Bhagavantam Award for contributions in the field of Acoustics. In between, he received the Inventions Promotions Award of the National Research Development Corporation (NRDC) in 1984. He received the Homi Jehangir Bhabha Medal of the Indian National Science Academy in 1993 and the Lifetime Achievement Award of the Biotech Research Society of India in 2004. He was also a recipient of the 2005 Lifetime Achievement Award of the Instrument Society of India and his alma mater, Indian Institute of Science, honored him with Distinguished Alumnus Award in 2008.

Raja Gopal, a National Lecturer of the University Grants Commission of India during 1974–75, has been awarded honoris causa doctorates by two Indian institutions, by the Burdwan University in 1999 and by the Indian Institute of Engineering Science and Technology, Shibpur in 2017. All the three major Indian science academies elected him as a fellow, starting with Indian Academy of Sciences in 1974 followed by Indian National Science Academy and National Academy of Sciences, India in 1981 and 1992 respectively. He was also an elected fellow of the Institute of Physics, Indian Cryogenics Council, Metrology Society of India, Ultrasonics Society of India and the Instrument Society of India. The award orations delivered by him include the Lord Rippon Memorial lecture of the Indian Association for the Cultivation of Science in 1987, P. A. Pandya Lecture of the Indian Physics Association in 1990, Golden Jubilee lecture of the Indian Science Congress Association in 1992, B. N. Singh Memorial lecture of the University of Delhi in 1992, Prof. S. Bhagavantham Memorial lecture of Andhra Pradesh Akademi of Sciences in 1994 and the Golden Jubilee Memorial lecture of the Indian Institute of Science on Metrology: New Vistas in 1998.

== Selected bibliography ==
=== Books ===
- Erode Subramanian Raja Gopal (1966). Specific heats at low temperatures. Plenum Press. ISBN 9780608057583.
- Erode Subramanian Raja Gopal (1974). Statistical Mechanics and Properties of Matter: Theory and Applications. Ellis Horwood. ISBN 978-0-85312-054-4.
- S. V. Subramanyam; Erode Subramanian Raja Gopal (1 August 1989). High temperature superconductors. Wiley. ISBN 978-0-470-21396-4.

=== Articles ===
- Raja Gopal Erode Subramanian (1958). "The Theory of the Dielectric Constant of Polydisperse Emulsions". Journal of the Indian Institute of Science. 40 (4).
- Venkatachalam, S.; Kumar, A.; Gopal, E. S. R. (1995). "On the nature of the coexistence surface and the critical double point in a polymer plus poor solvent system". The Journal of Chemical Physics. 103 (15): 6645–6654. Bibcode:1995JChPh.103.6645V. doi:10.1063/1.470394.
- Ramesh, K.; Asokan, S.; Sangunni, K. S.; Gopal, E. S. R. (1999). "Electrical resistivity behaviour of Ag-Ge-Te glasses under pressure at different temperatures: the influence of bonding and topological thresholds". Journal of Physics: Condensed Matter. 11 (19): 3897–3906. Bibcode:1999JPCM...11.3897R. doi:10.1088/0953-8984/11/19/309. S2CID 250813415.
- Ramesh, K.; Asokan, S.; Sangunni, K. S.; Gopal, E. S. R. (2000). "Glass formation in germanium telluride glasses containing metallic additives". Journal of Physics and Chemistry of Solids. 61 (1): 95–101. Bibcode:2000JPCS...61...95R. doi:10.1016/S0022-3697(99)00239-5.
- Ramesh, K.; Ramesh Rao, N.; Sangunni, K. S.; Gopal, E. S. R. (2003). "Electrical resistivity of Cu doped As-Se glasses at high pressure". Physica Status Solidi B. 235 (2): 536–541. Bibcode:2003PSSBR.235..536R. doi:10.1002/pssb.200301617. S2CID 98098695.
- Ramesha, K.; Asokan, S.; Gopal, E. S. R. (2006). "Chemical ordering and fragility minimum in Cu-As-Se glasses". Journal of Non-Crystalline Solids. 352 (26–27): 2905–2912. Bibcode:2006JNCS..352.2905R. doi:10.1016/j.jnoncrysol.2006.03.076.
- Devika Mudusu, Koteeswara Reddy Nandanapalli, Sreekantha Reddy Dugasani, Ramesh Karuppannan, Gunasekhar Kothakota Ramakrishna Reddy, Raja Gopal Erode Subramanian, Sung Ha Park (2017). "Metal–insulator–semiconductor field-effect transistors (MISFETs) using p-type SnS and nanometer-thick Al_{2}S_{3} layers". RSC Advances. 7 (18): 11111–11117. Bibcode:2017RSCAd...711111M. doi:10.1039/C7RA00041C.

== See also ==
- Germanium telluride
- MISFET
- Relative permittivity
- Electrical resistivity and conductivity
