= Yaragalla =

Yaragalla Halasagar
- village
- Location in Karnataka, India Yaragalla (India)
- Coordinates: 16.40°N 76.20°E
- Country: India
- State: Karnataka
- District: Bijapur district, Karnataka
- Talukas: Muddebihal, Karnataka

Population (2010)
  - Total: 1,500
  - Density: 200/km^{2} (520/sq mi)

Languages
  - Official: Kannada
- Time zone: UTC+5:30 (IST)
- PIN: 586129
- Vehicle registration: KA-28
- Nearest city: Bijapur, Karnataka
- Sex ratio: 60:40 ♂/♀
- Literacy: 70%
- Lok Sabha constituency: Bijapur
- Vidhan Sabha constituency: Muddebihal
- Climate: hot and cold (Köppen)
- Website: www.yaragalla.in

Yaragalla is a village in the southern state of Karnataka, India.

== Geography ==
It is located in Muddebihal taluk of Bijapur district, Karnataka. It is nearly 80 km from district headquarters, Bijapur. It is one of several small villages near Muddebihal town.

== Demographics ==
As of 2010 India census, Yaragalla had a population of 1,500 with 800 males and 700 females. The literacy rate is more than 70%.

The village hosts multiple Hindu temples: Shree Ghanamateshwar Temple, Shree Hanuman Temple, Shree Kidiganneshwara Temple and Shree Dyamavva devi Temple.

The villagers mainly celebrate 'Shri Kidiganneshwara Jatre (Festival)','Shri Ghanamateshwar punya thithi', 'Dyamavva devi jaatre', 'Moharam', 'Yella Amavasye' and Kara Hunnume, Nagara Panchami, Deepavli, Ugadi, Dassara.

== Economy ==
More than 80% of the land is used for agriculture. Jowar, wheat, groundnut, sunflower, and cotton are the main crops, but since water canals were built, more than half the population raises sugarcane. Sources of water irrigation include water canals, borewells and wells.

== Transport ==
Yaragalla is connected to the main town Muddebihal and nearby villages.

== Education ==
A Govt Higher Primary School (HPS, Yaragalla) enrolls 1st to 8th standard, including more than 150 students.
