= Amitava Datta =

Indian scientist

- Born: Kolkata, West Bengal, India
- Education: Scottish Church College; University of Calcutta; Visva-Bharati University
- Known for: Contributions to High Energy Physics
- Scientific career
- Fields: Physics
- Workplaces: Jadavpur University; Indian Institute of Science Education and Research, Kolkata

Amitava Datta is an Indian scientist and professor working in the area of high energy physics, especially in context of new physics through direct (particle production) and indirect (loop effects).

== Career ==
He obtained his Bachelor of Science degree in 1969 from the Scottish Church College under the University of Calcutta, and MSc and PhD degrees in physics from Visva Bharati in 1971 and 1977, respectively. He joined Jadavpur University as a lecturer in 1981 and was subsequently promoted to professor in 1998. In 2008, he moved to the Indian Institute of Science Education and Research, Kolkata as a professor. He held Visiting Positions at Fermilab, CERN and different research institutes of India.

== Research ==
He was the first to perform complete calculations of the amplitude of Do-D-o mixing, and the analyses of the consequence of Bo-B-o. He also derived new bounds on masses and couplings of gauge bosons, exotic fermions and supersymmetric particles using the data from the Large Electron Positron (LEP) collider at CERN and the Tevatron collider at Fermilab.

== Honors and awards ==
Datta is a Fellow of the Indian National Science Academy, which cited him for "significant contributions to high-energy physics (HEP)." The citation outlined his research interests, and added "Datta has played a major role in the development of HEP in the country and organized several conferences. He has co-edited several books and proceedings such as Particle Phenomenology in the 90's, Highlights of Particle Phenomenology and CP Violation."

Datta held Alexander von Humboldt Fellowships at the Institute for Physics, University of Dortmund, Germany, 1986–88; at Dortmund in 1994, at the Physikalisches Inst., Univ. of Bonn in 2002, at Dortmund in 2004, and Bonn in 2007. He also held Associateships of the International Centre for Theoretical Physics, Trieste, Italy, from 1991 to 1995, and of the Institute of Theoretical Physics Beijing, 1997–99.
