= Harish-Chandra Research Institute =

Indian university and research institute

- Former name: Mehta Research Institute
- Type: Research Institute
- Established: 1975; 51 years ago
- Academic affiliations: Homi Bhabha National Institute
- Director: Ujjwal Sen
- Academic staff: 30+
- Administrative staff: 30+
- Doctoral students: 80
- Other students: 25
- Location: Prayagraj, Uttar Pradesh, 211019, India
- Campus: 66 acres (27 ha)
- Website: www.hri.res.in

The Harish-Chandra Research Institute (HRI) is an institution dedicated to research in mathematics and theoretical physics, located in Prayagraj, Uttar Pradesh in India. Established in 1975, HRI offers masters and doctoral program in affiliation with the Homi Bhabha National Institute.

HRI has a residential campus in Jhusi town in Prayagraj on the banks of the river Ganga. The institute has over 30 faculty, 50 doctoral students and 25 postdoctoral visiting research fellows and scientists. HRI is funded by the Department of Atomic Energy (DAE) of the Government of India.

== History ==
The institute was founded as the Mehta Research Institute of Mathematics and Mathematical Physics in 1975, with an endowment from the B.S. Mehta Trust, Calcutta. The institute was initially managed by Badri Nath Prasad and following his death in January 1966 by S.R. Sinha, both from the Allahabad University. The first official director of the institute was Prabhu Lal Bhatnagar in 1975 when it became truly operational. He was followed by S.R. Sinha again.

On 29 November 1975 B. Devadas Acharya joined the Mehta Research Institute (MRI) as its first postdoctoral fellow and on 1 January 1980 was appointed as the first assistant professor of mathematics at MRI. During his research work between 1975 and 1984, he gave many talks on graph theory and its applications in computing. In one of his talks to international audiences, he envisioned a computing engine based on matrices which would be much more powerful.

Sharadchandra Shankar Shrikhande joined the institute as its director in January 1983. The institute was facing financial difficulties, and Shrikhande sought DAE support for the institute. Following the recommendations of the DAE review committee, the Government of Uttar Pradesh committed to provide a campus for HRI, while the DAE committed to provide full funding for all operational expenses.

In January 1990, the institute was granted about 66 acres (270,000 m^{2}) in Jhusi town of Prayagraj district and H.S. Mani took over as director. The institute moved to its present campus in 1996. Since then, the institute has grown in facilities, scope of research as well as number of faculty and students.

In October 2000, the institute was renamed in honour of renowned Indian mathematician Harish-Chandra.

Ravi S. Kulkarni succeeded Mani as the director in August 2001 and was followed by Amitava Raychaudhuri in July 2005. Jayanta Kumar Bhattacharjee followed in May 2011.

== Research activities ==
The HRI Mathematics research group has four teams with focus on Algebra, Analysis, Geometry & Topology and Number Theory. The HRI Physics research group consists of teams focused on Astrophysics, Condensed Matter Physics, High Energy Physics, String Theory and Quantum Information & Computation. Prominent HRI faculty members in the area of String Theory include Ashoke Sen and Rajesh Gopakumar. HRI faculty member in the area of Quantum Information and Computation includes Arun K. Pati, Aditi Sen De and Ujjawal Sen.

Besides its research, the Mathematics group is known for conducting the annual Summer Programme in Mathematics (SPIM), a highly popular scheme that invites interested undergraduates from across India for an intensive month-long immersive program in advanced mathematics. The Physics group has also started Visiting Students Program (VSP) in Physics to motivate students for higher studies in physics.

=== Awards ===
HRI faculty members have received numerous research awards. The following faculty members of the institute have received the Shanti Swarup Bhatnagar Prize for Science and Technology:

- Ashoke Sen (1994)
- Amitava Raychaudhuri (1997)
- Biswarup Mukhopadhyaya (2003)
- Pinaki Majumdar (2007)
- Rajesh Gopakumar (2009)
- Aditi De (2018)

Ashoke Sen received the prestigious Infosys Prize in 2009 and Fundamental Physics Prize in July 2012. He was also awarded the prestigious civilian award Padma Bhushan by President of India in April 2013. Rajesh Gopakumar received the International Centre for Theoretical Physics Prize in 2006.
