= Amitava Raychaudhuri =

Indian theoretical particle physicist

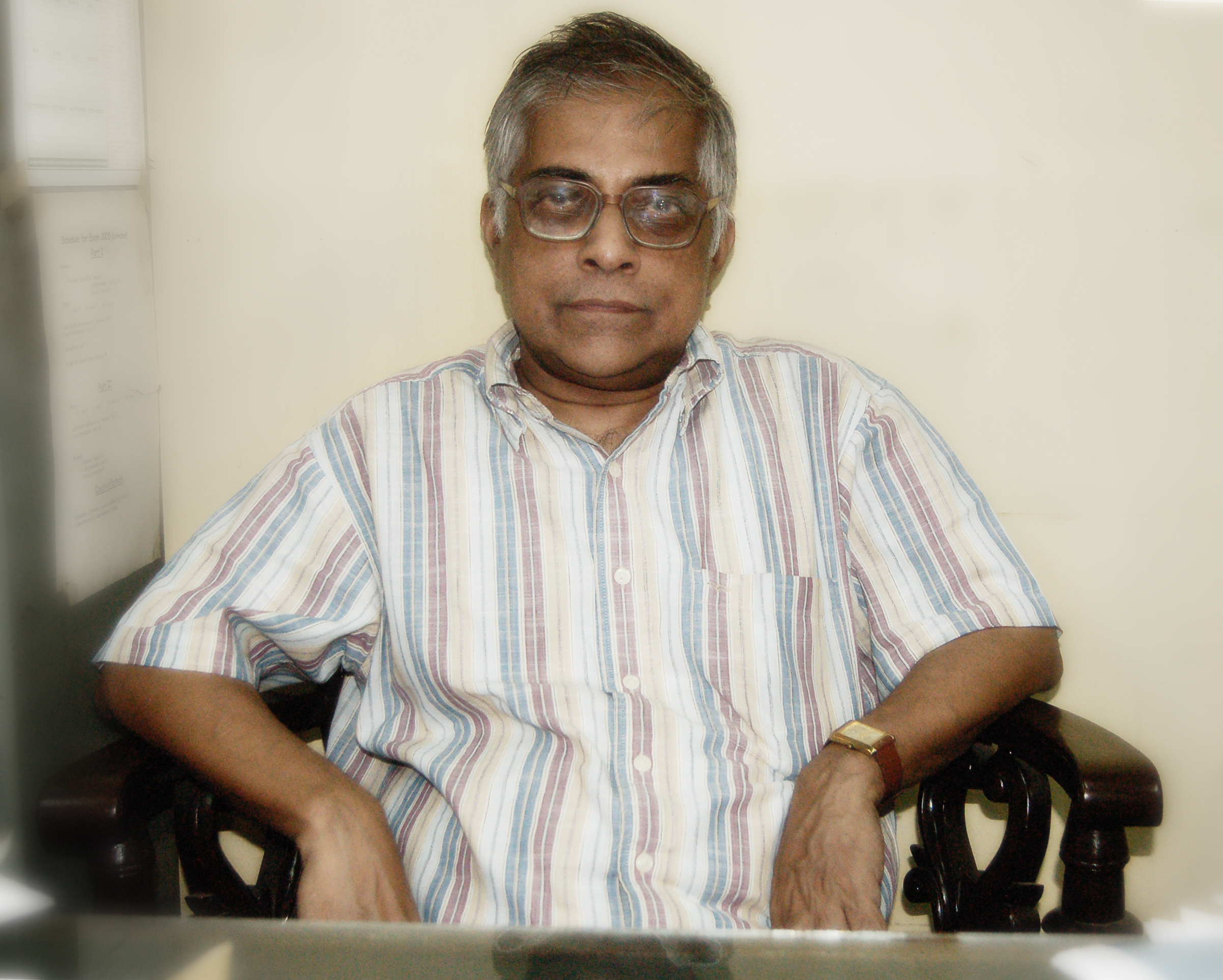
- Raychaudhuri at the University of Calcutta
- Born: 17 March 1952 (age 74); Kolkata, India
- Education: Presidency College, Kolkata; Delhi University; University of Maryland, College Park
- Known for: Particle physics
- Awards: Shanti Swarup Bhatnagar Prize for Science and Technology
- Scientific career
- Fields: Theoretical physics Particle Physics; Astroparticle physics
- Workplaces: Science College; University of Calcutta; Harish-Chandra Research Institute, Allahabad, India; Oklahoma State University; University of Cambridge; Lawrence Berkeley Laboratory; CERN; Tata Institute of Fundamental Research; University of Oxford
- Doctoral advisor: Oscar W. Greenberg

Amitava Raychaudhuri is an Indian theoretical particle physicist. He is Professor Emeritus at the Physics Department of the Science College, University of Calcutta where he earlier held the Sir Tarak Nath Palit Chair Professorship. He is the nephew of another renowned Indian physicist, Amal Kumar Raychaudhuri.

== Early life and education ==
Raychaudhuri was born in Calcutta, India and did his schooling at the South Point School (India). He later attended Presidency College, Calcutta from where he obtained his BSc degree in Physics in 1970 and then went on to complete his MSc degree at Delhi University in 1973. Under the supervision of Oscar W. Greenberg, Raychaudhuri obtained his PhD degree in Particle Physics from the University of Maryland, College Park in 1977.

== Research and career ==
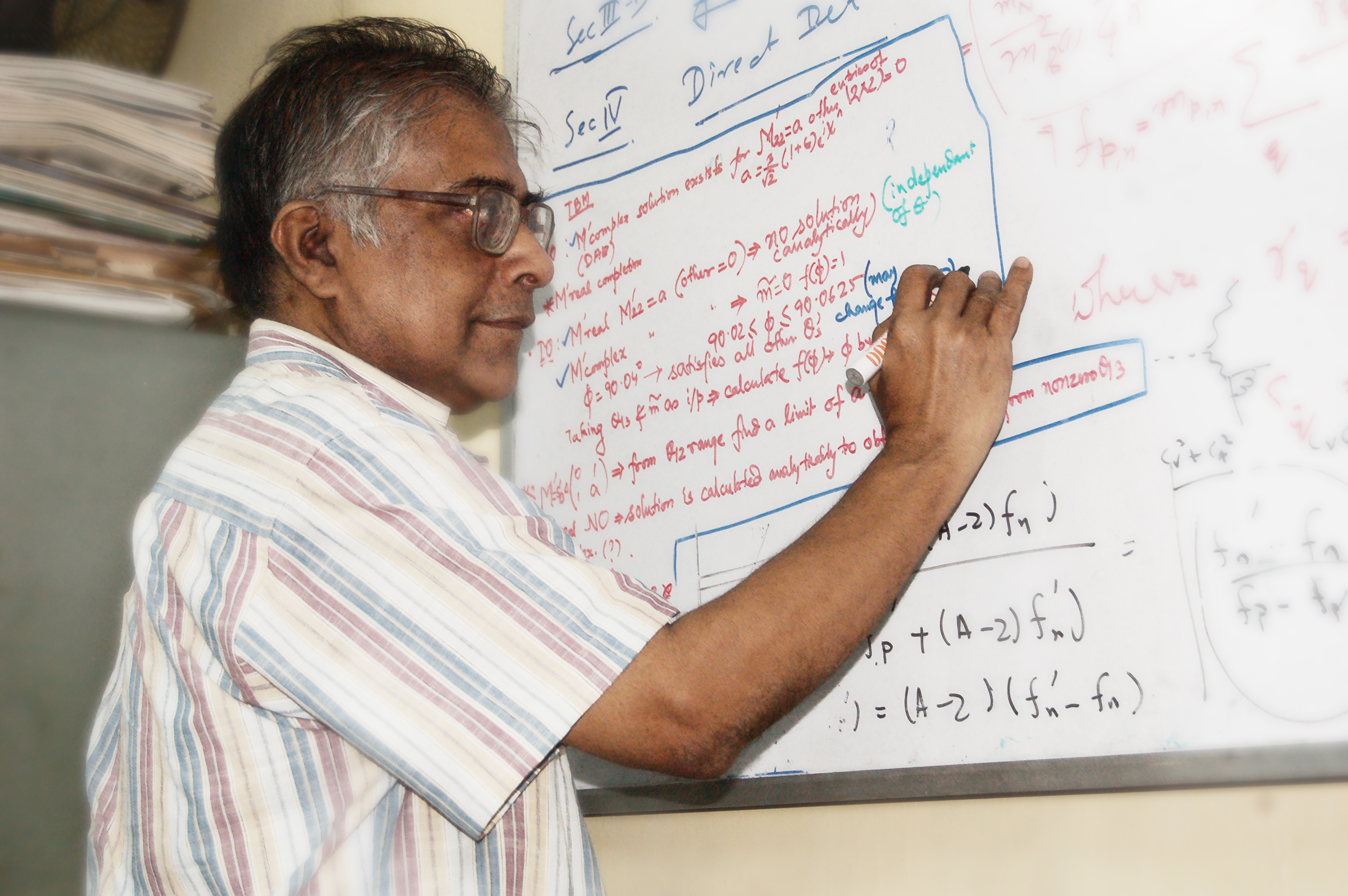
Amitava Raychaudhuri taking a class at the University of Calcutta.

After postdoctoral work at the University of Oxford and the Tata Institute of Fundamental Research, Mumbai he joined the Rajabazar Science College campus of University of Calcutta in 1980 as a lecturer in physics, where he became Reader and then the Sir Tarak Nath Palit Professor. During his tenure at the University of Calcutta, he was a Scientific Associate (1983–84) at CERN, Senior Indo-US Fulbright Fellow (1988–89) at the Lawrence Berkeley Laboratory and Senior Marie Curie Fellow (1994) at the University of Cambridge. He was also a Visiting Professor (1998) at the Oklahoma State University. He was the Director of the Harish-Chandra Research Institute, Allahabad from 2005 to 2011 after which he rejoined the University of Calcutta as faculty.

Raychaudhuri has worked in diverse areas within particle physics encompassing quantum chromodynamics, grand unified theories, classical solutions, left-right symmetric models, FCNC, supersymmetry, neutrino physics, extra dimensions, etc. He made contributions in CP-violation in supersymmetric models, the possibility of parity restoration at relatively low energies, neutrino masses and mixing in supersymmetric and other models, long baseline neutrino experiments, besides making a brief but important foray in the foundations of quantum mechanics.

== Awards and achievements ==
He was the recipient of the INSA Young Scientist Award in 1982, the Shanti Swarup Bhatnagar Prize for Science and Technology, the highest science award in India, in the physical sciences category in 1997, the J.C. Bose fellowship, the National Merit Certificate and Prize and the National Science Talent Search Scholarship in 1967. He is a Fellow of the Indian National Science Academy, National Academy of Sciences, Allahabad and the Indian Academy of Sciences, Bangalore. He was also a two-term senior associate of the Abdus Salam International Centre for Theoretical Physics (ICTP), Trieste, Italy. In 2005, Raychaudhuri was conferred the honour of International Alumnus of the Year by the University of Maryland Alumni Association. He is a recipient of D.Sc. (honoris causa) from the University of Gour Banga and the University of North Bengal.
