= Institute of Physics, Bhubaneswar =

Indian research institute

Coordinates: 20.307191°N 85.830243°E

- Type: Research Institution
- Established: 1972; 54 years ago
- Founders: Bidhu Bhusan Das
- Affiliations: Homi Bhabha National Institute; Department of Atomic Energy, Government of India
- Director: Karuna Kar Nanda
- Location: Bhubaneswar, Odisha, India
- Campus: Urban
- Acronym: IOP, Bhubaneswar
- Website: www.iopb.res.in

Institute of Physics, Bhubaneswar is an autonomous research institution of the Department of Atomic Energy (DAE), Government of India. The institute was founded by Professor Bidhu Bhusan Das, who was Director of Public Instruction, Odisha, at that time. Das set up the institute in 1972, supported by the Government of Odisha under the patronage of Odisha's education minister Banamali Patnaik, and chose Dr. Trilochan Pradhan as its first director, when the Institute started theoretical research programs in the various branches of physics. Other notable physicists in the institute's early days included Prof. T. P. Das, of SUNY, Albany, New York, USA and Prof. Jagdish Mohanty of IIT Kanpur and Australian National University, Canberra. In 1981, the Institute moved to its present campus near Chandrasekharpur, Bhubaneswar. It was taken over by the Department of Atomic Energy, India on 25 March 1985 and started functioning as an autonomous body.

== Research ==
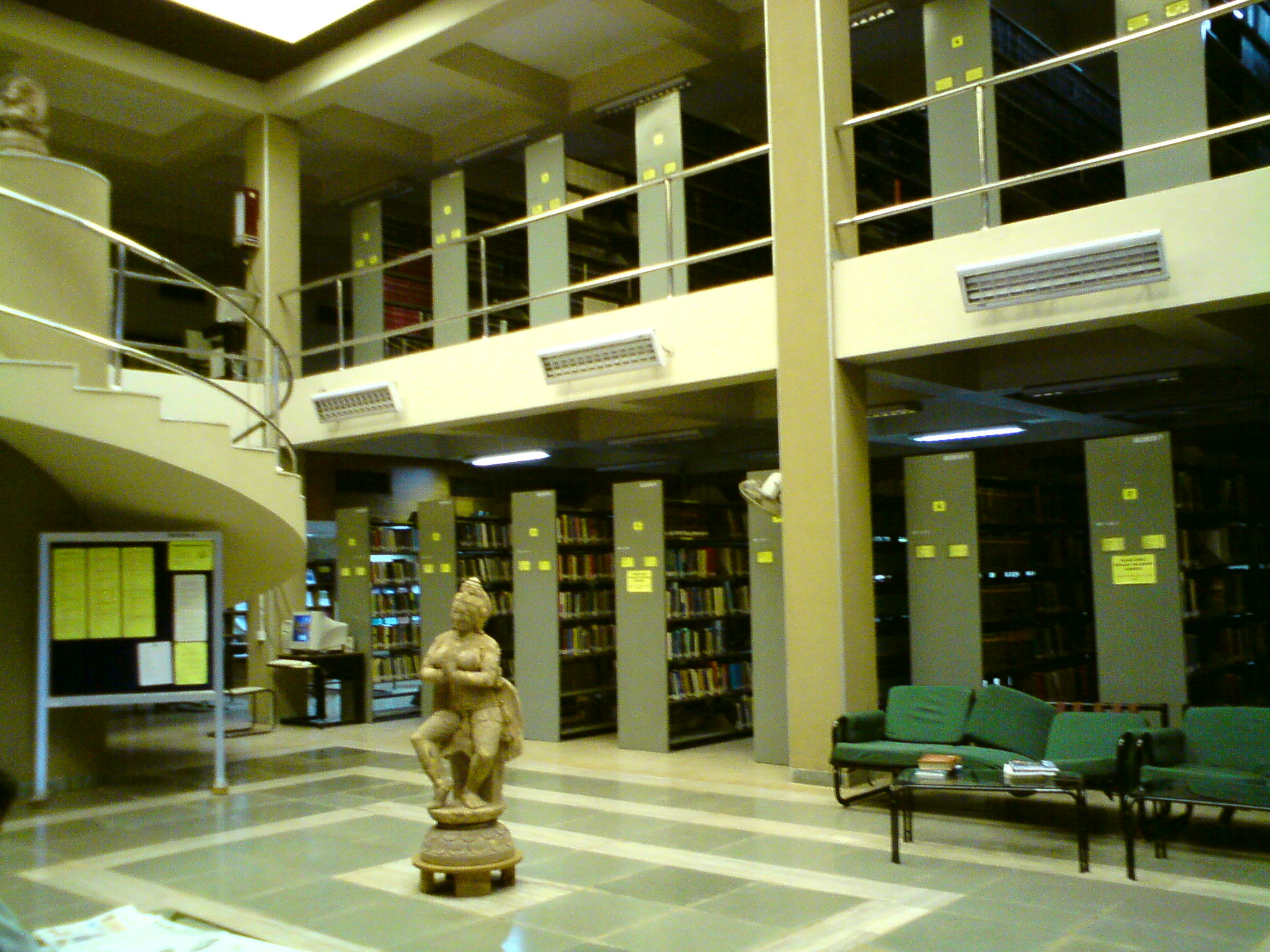
IOPB library

The institute conducts research in theoretical and experimental physics.

=== Theoretical physics ===
Research areas in theoretical physics include condensed matter theory, nuclear and high energy physics. High-energy theorists at IOP have made contributions to field theories, phase transitions in early universe, cosmology, the Planck scale phenomena, string theory and high-energy nuclear physics such as quark–gluon plasma (QGP), equation of state and nuclear astrophysics, neutron stars, high-energy phenomenology and neutrino physics phenomenology. In theoretical condensed matter physics, research is centered on disordered systems, magnetism, superconductivity, low-dimensional systems, statistical physics, strongly correlated systems, phase transitions, clusters and nanomaterials.

=== Experimental physics ===
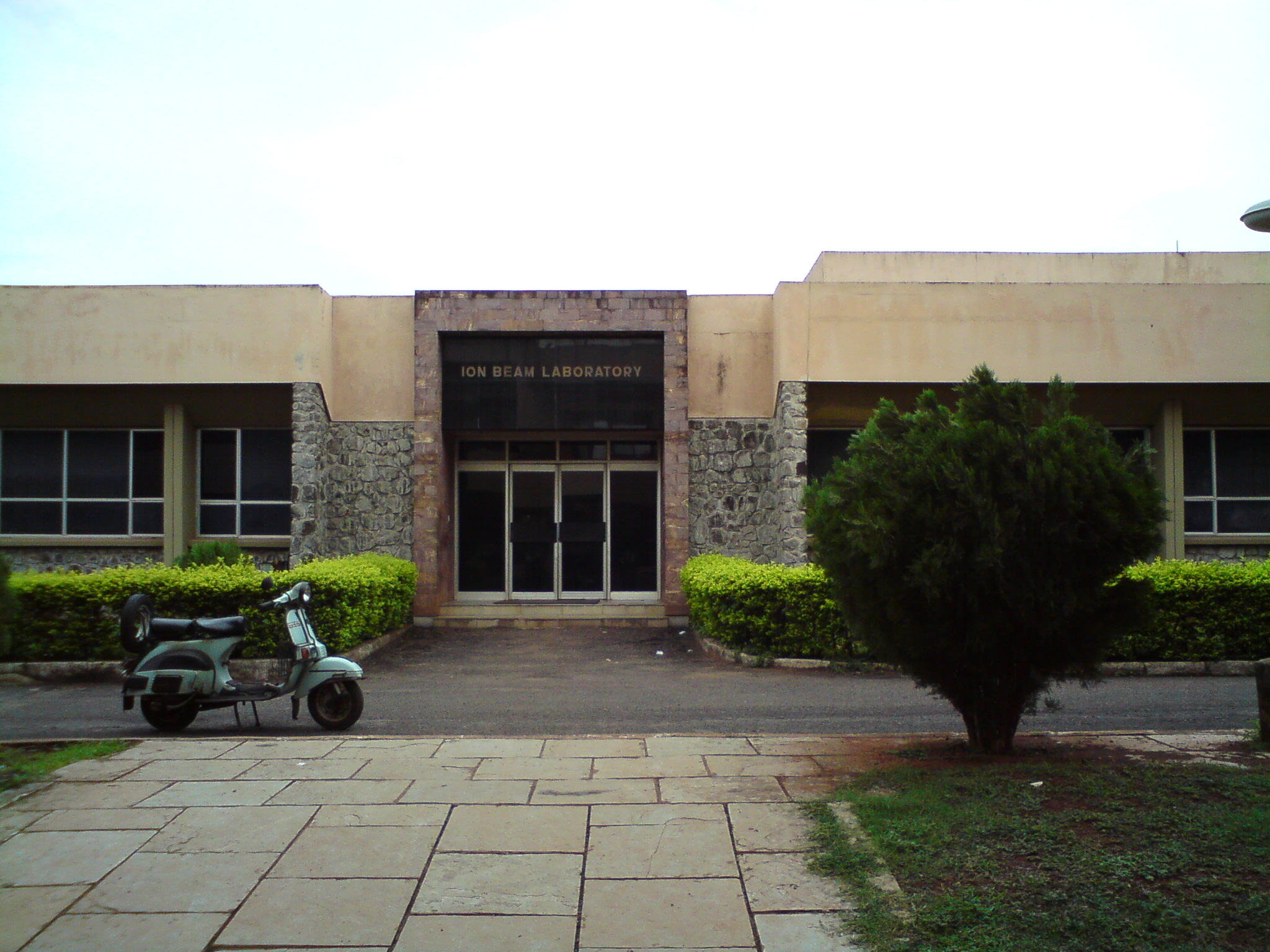
The Ion Beam Laboratory at IOP

The experimental physics group encompasses accelerator-based research for advanced chemical and radioisotope analysis. The ion beam laboratory (IBL) is equipped with a 3MV tandem accelerator (NEC 9SDH-2). Research at the IBL includes Rutherford back scattering, Particle-induced X-ray emission, accelerator mass spectrometry, channeling, ion implantation, surface modification and characterization, microbeam analysis and nuclear reaction studies.

The 3 million volt NEC 9SDH-2 pelletron accelerator of the Accelerator Mass Spectrometry lab is a multi-disciplinary research accelerator for various physics experiments. The experimental facilities available in the ion beam laboratory include an accelerator mass spectrometry (AMS) for radiocarbon dating, micro-beam facility and an external beam facility. Other experimental facilities include an ESCA (electron spectroscopy for chemical analysis), HRTEM (high resolution transmission electron microscope), MBE (molecular beam epitaxy), cluster generator and nano material research facility.

== Education ==
The Institute runs regular pre-doctoral (Master of Philosophy) and doctoral (PhD.) programs for postgraduate students of physics. The course work is planned to emphasize doctoral research and teaching skills.
