= C12H15N =

The molecular formula C_{12}H_{15}N (molar mass: 173.25 g/mol, exact mass: 173.1204 u) may refer to:

- Benzomorphan
- Bicifadine (DOV-220,075)
- Desmethylselegiline
- Julolidine
- MPTP (1-methyl-4-phenyl-1,2,3,6-tetrahydropyridine)
- 2,2,4-Trimethyl-1,2-dihydroquinoline
