= Swapan Kumar Pati =

Indian quantum chemist (born 1968)

- Born: 7 December 1968 (age 57); Paschim Medinipur district, West Bengal, India
- Education: Jawaharlal Nehru Centre for Advanced Scientific Research
- Known for: Studies on electronic optical and magnetic phenomena in molecular systems
- Awards: 2006 Materials Research Society of India Medal; 2007 CRSI Bronze Medal; 2012 TWAS Prize; 2008 Birla Science Prize; 2009 CSJ Distinguished Lectureship Award; 2010 Shanti Swarup Bhatnagar Prize
- Scientific career
- Fields: Quantum chemistry
- Workplaces: Midnapore College; Kalyani University; Indian Institute of Science; Northwestern University

Swapan Kumar Pati (born 7 December 1968) is an Indian quantum chemist, a professor of the department of chemistry at the Jawaharlal Nehru Centre for Advanced Scientific Research and the head of the Quantum Theory Molecules to Materials Group at the institute. He is known for his studies on electronic optical and magnetic phenomena in molecular systems and is an elected fellow of the Indian Academy of Sciences, National Academy of Sciences, India and The World Academy of Sciences. The Council of Scientific and Industrial Research, the apex agency of the Government of India for scientific research, awarded him the Shanti Swarup Bhatnagar Prize for Science and Technology, one of the highest Indian science awards, in 2010, for his contributions to chemical sciences.

== Biography ==
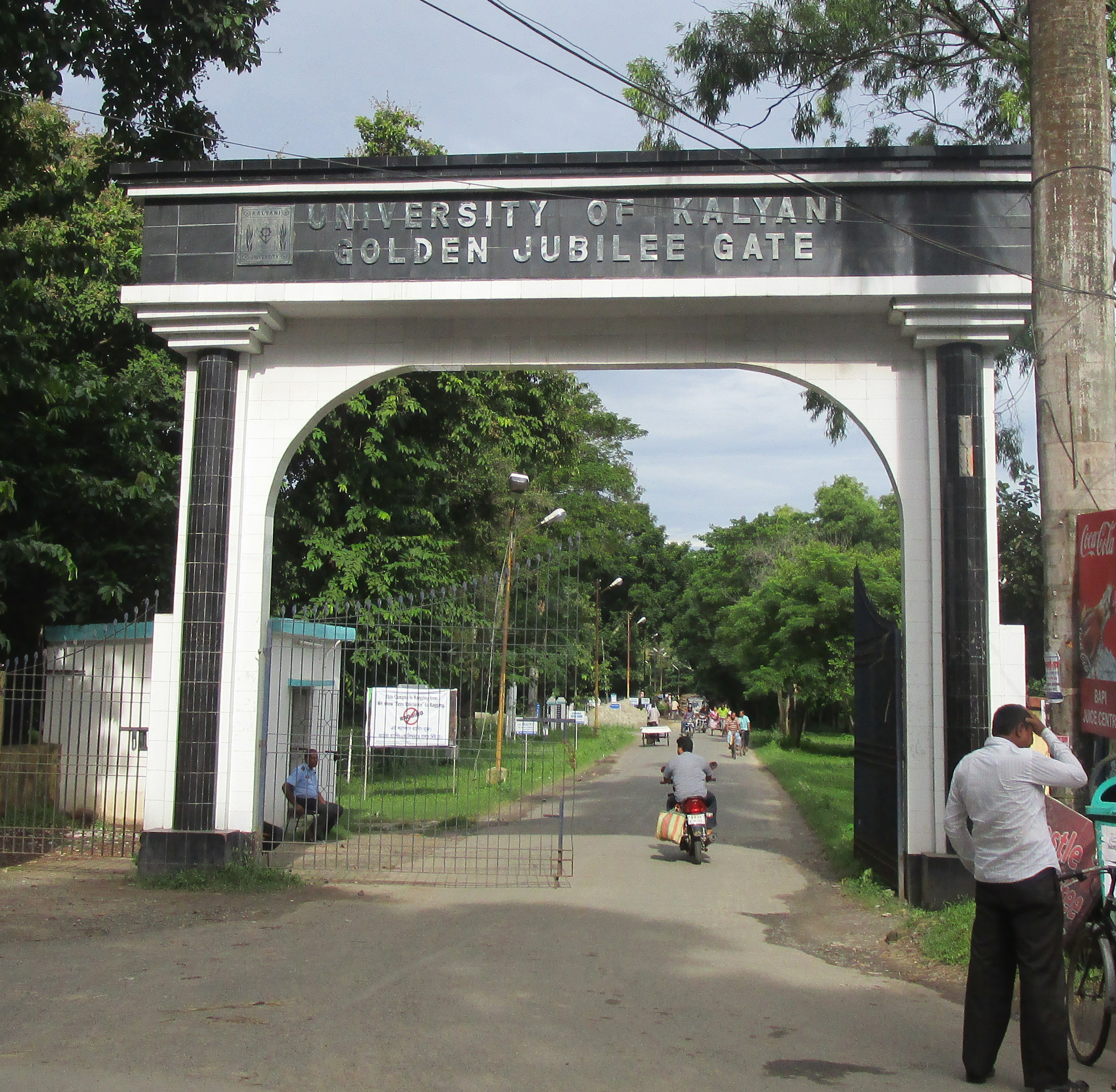
University of Kalyani

Born on 7 December 1968 in Paschim Medinipur district in the Indian state of West Bengal, S. K. Pati did his graduate studies in chemistry at Midnapore College of the Vidyasagar University and passed a master's degree from Kalyani University. Subsequently, he moved to Bengaluru to pursue his doctoral studies at Solid State and Structural Chemistry Unit of the Indian Institute of Science and completed his post-doctoral work at University of California, Davis and Northwestern University. On his return to India, he joined the Theoretical Sciences Unit of the Jawaharlal Nehru Centre for Advanced Scientific Research as a member of faculty where he serves as a professor and the head of the Quantum Theory Molecules to Materials Group.

== Legacy ==
Pati's researches fall into five major areas; Quantum Magnetism, Optical and Opto-electronic Properties, Transport in Nanostructures and Biomolecular Systems, Hydrogen Storage in Organic Molecular Solids and New Carbon based Materials and his studies are reported to have widened the understanding of electronic optical and magnetic phenomena in molecular systems. The process developed by him for the preparation of Julolidine conjugates have earned him a patent. His researches have been documented by way of a number of peer-reviewed articles; Google Scholar, an online article repository of scientific articles, has listed 292 of them. He is a member of American Physical Society, American Chemical Society and The World Academy of Sciences. He sits in the editorial board of Journal of Scientific and Industrial Research and has served as an advisory board member of Journal of Materials Chemistry of the Royal Society of Chemistry and the Journal of Physical Chemistry of American Chemical Society, both during 2009–11.

Patents

- "Julolidine conjugates and methods for their preparation and use". Justia Patents. 2016.

== Awards and honors ==
Pati, who is a junior associate at the Abdus Salam International Centre for Theoretical Physics since 2003, received the MRSI Medal of the Materials Research Society of India in 2006 and the Bronze Medal of the Chemical Research Society of India in 2007. The World Academy of Sciences selected him as a Young Affiliate the same year; TWAS would honor him again with an elected fellowship in 2010 and with the TWAS Prize in 2012. In between, he received the Swaranjayanti Fellowship of the Department of Science and Technology in 2006, the Birla Science Prize in 2008 and the Distinguished Lectureship Award of the Chemical Society of Japan in 2009. The Council of Scientific and Industrial Research awarded him the Shanti Swarup Bhatnagar Prize, one of the highest Indian science awards, in 2010 and he was elected as a fellow by the by Indian Academy of Sciences and the National Academy of Sciences, India in 2010.

== See also ==
- Julolidine
