= Rajesh Ganapathy =

Indian physicist

- Education: IIT Madras (M.Sc.); Indian Institute of Science (Ph.D.)
- Known for: Experimental soft matter physics
- Awards: Shanti Swarup Bhatnagar Prize for Science and Technology (2020); Asian Scientist 100 (2021)
- Scientific career
- Fields: Soft condensed matter physics
- Workplaces: Jawaharlal Nehru Centre for Advanced Scientific Research (JNCASR), Bengaluru

Rajesh Ganapathy is a physicist at the International Centre for Materials Science in Jawaharlal Nehru Centre for Advanced Scientific Research (JNCASR), Bengaluru. He specialises in experimental soft condensed matter physics. He was awarded the Shanti Swarup Bhatnagar Prize for Science and Technology for his contributions to physical sciences in 2020.

== Education ==
Rajesh Ganapathy secured his M Sc degree from Indian Institute of Technology Madras in 1999 and Ph D degree from Indian Institute of Science, Bangalore in 2006. He was a post doctoral fellow in Cornell University during 2007–09 and he joined JNCASR in 2009.

== Awards ==
In 2021, Ganapathy became a laureate of the Asian Scientist 100 by the Asian Scientist.

== Publications ==
- "Rajesh Ganapathy". Google Scholar.
- "Shanti Swarup Bhatnagar awardee's demystification of transformation of glass to crystal can help dispose liquid nuclear waste safely". Ministry of Science & Technology, Govt of India.
- "Devitrification Demystified". Indinan Institute of Science, Bangalore.
