= M. R. S. Rao =

Indian scientist (1948–2023)

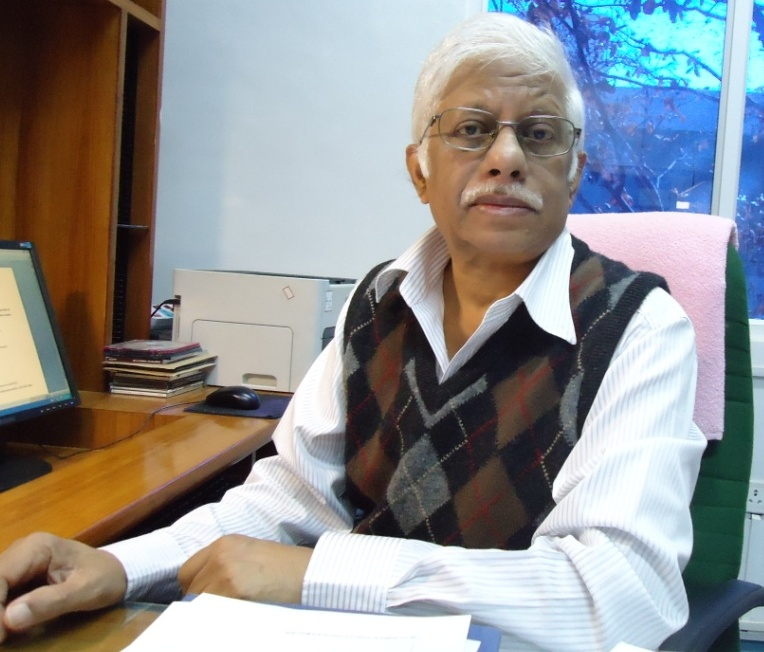
- Rao in 2010
- Born: 21 January 1948; Mysore, Mysore State, India
- Died: 13 August 2023 (aged 75); Bangaluru, Karnataka, India
- Education: Bangalore University; Indian Institute of Science
- Known for: Chromatin Biology and Cancer Biology
- Awards: Padma Shri (2010) and Shanti Swarup Bhatnagar Prize for Science and Technology(1988)
- Scientific career
- Fields: Biological Sciences
- Workplaces: Jawaharlal Nehru Centre for Advanced Scientific Research
- Doctoral advisor: G. Padmanabhan
- Doctoral students: Tapas Kumar Kundu B. J. Rao

Manchanahalli Rangaswamy Satyanarayana Rao (21 January 1948 – 13 August 2023) was an Indian scientist. He was awarded the fourth-highest civilian award, the Padma Shri, for Science and Engineering in 2010. From 2003 to 2013 he was president of Jawaharlal Nehru Centre for Advanced Scientific Research (JNCASR) in Bangalore, India.

== Education and personal life ==
Rao obtained his Bachelor of Science degree in 1966 and Master's of Science degree in 1968 from Bangalore University. He received his Ph.D. in biochemistry from the Indian Institute of Science (IISc), Bangalore in 1973. Former IISc Director Govindarajan Padmanabhan was his doctoral advisor at the Department of Biochemistry. From 1974 to 1976 he was an assistant professor at Baylor College of Medicine in Houston, Texas, where he performed his postdoctoral research. He later returned to India and joined the Department of Biochemistry at IISc(see Professional life).

Rao was an honorary professor at Jawaharlal Nehru Centre for Advanced Scientific Research (JNCASR), Bangalore and was actively running its Chromatin Biology laboratory until his death. He is regarded by colleagues as one of the scientists who helped establish Chromatin Biology research in India. During his research career, his lab at IISc and JNCASR, has mentored many Ph.D. students, postdoctoral fellows, and research trainees.

Rao was married to Padma S. Rao with whom he had two sons. Rao died on 13 August 2023, at the age of 75.

== Professional life ==
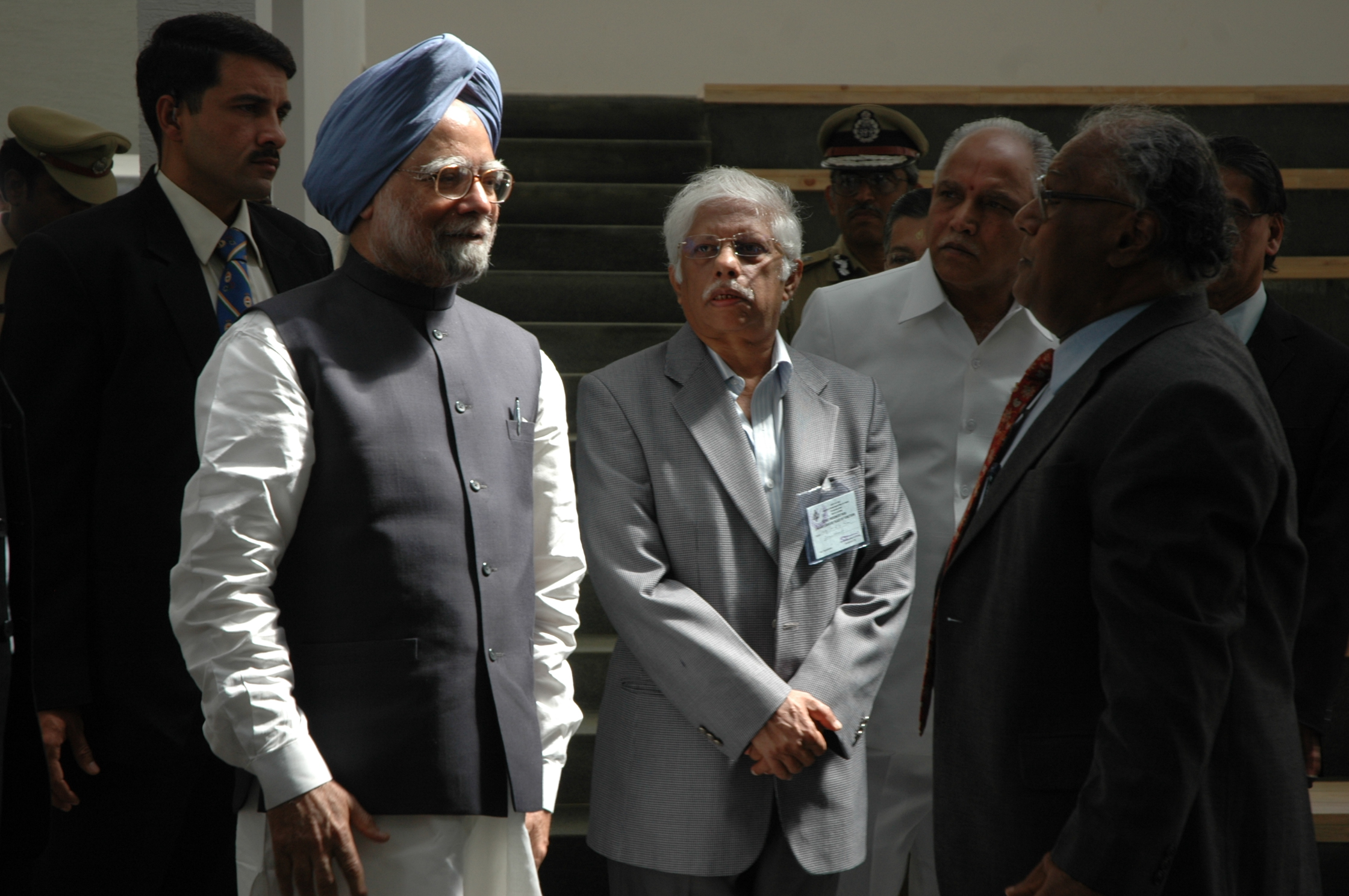
Rao with Manmohan Singh, Prime Minister of India; B.S. Yeddyurappa, Chief Minister of Karnataka; and C. N. R. Rao during a function at JNCASR, Bangalore.

After his postdoctoral research and assistant professorship at Baylor College of Medicine, he returned to India in 1978 and joined the IISc's Department of Biochemistry as an assistant professor. He was promoted to associate professor in 1987 and professor in 1991. He was the chairman of IISc's Centre for Genetic Engineering from 1990 to 1993. On several occasions, he served as a visiting professor at Baylor College of Medicine (1983, 1986), Harvard Medical School (1988–1990, 1993), Ludwig Institute for Cancer Research, and University of California at San Diego (1998).

In 2003, he was appointed chair and president of Jawaharlal Nehru Centre for Advanced Scientific Research (JNCASR), Bangalore. He was the chairperson of IISc's Department of Biochemistry (1998–2003) and Molecular Biology and Genetics Unit from 2005 to 2009. He served as president of the Society of Biological Chemists (India) for two terms between 2000 and 2004. Rao was a governing body member and scientific advisor to several research institutes in India. He was a former chairman of the Board of Governors of Indian Institute of Science Education and Research, Thiruvananthapuram, Kerala. He was a member of the Board of Governors of Indian Institute of Science Education and Research, Kolkata; chairman of the Research Council of Indian Institute of Chemical Biology, Kolkata; and member of the Selection/Search Committee of CSIR Directors.

Rao served as a chairperson or subject matter expert for several scientific councils and academies, such as Department of Science and Technology; Department of Biotechnology; Council of Scientific and Industrial Research; Indian Council of Medical Research; Indian Academy of Sciences; National Academy of Sciences, India; Indian National Science Academy; Third World Academy of Sciences; and science policy-making committees in Government of India organisations, institutions and universities. He was the chairperson for the Task Force on Human Genetics & Genome Analysis at the Department of Biotechnology, India. He was also a member of the governing body of the Institute of Bioinformatics and Applied Biotechnology, Bangalore. He served as a member of the academic council of Poornaprajna Institute of Scientific Research, Bangalore.

In 2010, Rao was appointed a member of the National Science and Engineering Research Board, which supports innovation, research and development in various sciences in India.

Rao was on the editorial board of several peer-reviewed journals, including as senior member on the editorial board of the American Journal of Cancer Research (AJCR).

== Publications ==
Rao was a scientific researcher and author of many peer-reviewed and oft-cited international journal articles. Most of his research work had been focused on Chromatin biology and Cancer biology.

As of August 2023, his 1993 publication on colon cancer, published in Cell (journal), has been cited over 3700 times.

== Awards and recognitions ==
Rao had received several medals, awards and fellowships both in India and abroad. He was awarded the Padma Shri in 2010 for his contribution to Science and Engineering. He received the Shanti Swarup Bhatnagar Prize for Science and Technology in 1988 from the Council of Scientific and Industrial Research (CSIR), the Dr. B. R. Ambedkar Centenary Award from the Indian Council of Medical Research in 2005, the Jawaharlal Nehru Birth Centenary Lecture award from the Indian National Science Academy (INSA), the FICCI Award, the J. C. Bose Medal of INSA, a Rockefeller Foundation Biotechnology Fellowship, the Om Prakash Bhasin Award, the The World Academy of Sciences (TWAS) Medal Lecture Award 2008, the Ranbaxy Science Foundation Award for Basic Medical Sciences, and the Sir M. Visveswaraiah Senior Scientist State award from the Government of Karnataka. He received the Prof. N. Appaji Rao Best Mentor Award in 2011, an award given by the Indian Institute of Science Alumni Association (IIScAA), Bangalore.

Rao was a fellow of the Indian Academy of Sciences (IAS), Bangalore; the Indian National Science Academy (INSA), Delhi; the National Academy of Sciences, India (NASI), Allahabad; the National Academy of Medical Sciences (FAMS), India; the Third World Academy of Science (TWAS), Trieste, Italy; the American Society for Cell Biology, the American Society for Microbiology, the American Society for Biochemistry and Molecular Biology, and the Human Genome Organization.
