= Tapas Kumar Kundu =

Indian molecular biologist

- Born: 2 January 1962 (age 64); Hili, West Bengal, India
- Education: Indian Institute of Science; National Institute of Genetics; Rockefeller University
- Known for: Studies on regulation of Gene expression
- Awards: 1993 International Council of Scientific Union Award; 1995 IISc Giri Memorial Award; 2005 Shanti Swarup Bhatnagar Prize; 2005 N-BIOS Prize; 2008 NASI-Reliance Platinum Jubilee Award; 2011 G. D. Birla Award for Scientific Research; 2011 Ranbaxy Research Award; 2012 MM India Innovation Award
- Scientific career
- Fields: Molecular biology
- Workplaces: Jawaharlal Nehru Centre for Advanced Scientific Research
- Doctoral advisor: M. R. S. Rao

Tapas Kumar Kundu (born 2 January 1962) is an Indian molecular biologist, academician and at present the Director of Central Drug Research Institute, a prestigious research institute of Council of Scientific and Industrial Research at Lucknow. He is the head of the Transcription and Disease Laboratory of Jawaharlal Nehru Centre for Advanced Scientific Research. He is known for his studies on the regulation of Gene expression and his contributions in cancer diagnostics and the development of new drug candidates for cancer and AIDS therapeutics. He is an elected fellow of the Indian Academy of Sciences, Indian National Science Academy and the National Academy of Sciences, India and a J. C. Bose National Fellow of the Department of Science and Technology. The Council of Scientific and Industrial Research, the apex agency of the Government of India for scientific research, awarded him the Shanti Swarup Bhatnagar Prize for Science and Technology, one of the highest Indian science awards, in 2005, for his contributions to biological sciences. He is also a recipient of the National Bioscience Award for Career Development of the Department of Biotechnology.

== Biography ==
Born on 2 January 1962 at Hili, a border town near Balurghat in Dakshin Dinajpur district in the Indian state of West Bengal to Kalachand Kundu and Dipali couple, Tapas Kumar Kundu graduated in agriculture (BSc hons) from Bidhan Chandra Krishi Viswavidyalaya in 1986 and completed his master's degree in biochemistry from University of Agricultural Sciences, Bangalore in 1989, winning a gold medal for standing first in the master's degree examination. He enrolled for doctoral studies at the Indian Institute of Science in 1990 and secured a PhD under the guidance of M. R. S. Rao in 1995 for his thesis, Zinc-Metalloprotein Nature of Rat Spermatidal Protein TP2 and its Interactions with DNA. (Note: His thesis won the Giri Memorial Award for best thesis in Biochemistry.) After a short stint at the National Institute of Genetics, Japan during 1995–96 as a visiting foreign research associate, he did his post-doctoral studies at the Laboratory of Biochemistry and Molecular Biology of Rockefeller University during 1996–99. Returning to India the same year, he joined Jawaharlal Nehru Centre for Advanced Scientific Research at their Molecular Biology and Genetics Unit where he became an assistant professor in 2005 and heads the Transcription and Disease Laboratory of the institution in the capacity of a JNCASR Silver Jubillee Professor since 2015.

Kundu is a life member and a former vice president of the Society of Biological Chemists, India and is its incumbent president. He is a nominated member of American Chemical Society and American Society for Biochemistry and Molecular Biology and a member of the American Society for Microbiology. He was among the biologists who founded the Chemical Biology Society, India of the Indian Institute of Chemical Biology in 2013 and serves as it secretary. An adjunct professor at the Special Centre for Molecular Medicine of Jawaharlal Nehru University, he served as a member of the Reader Panel of Nature and is a former member of the editorial board of the Journal of Biological Chemistry (June 2011–September 2016). In 2019, the School of Biological Sciences, Madurai Kamaraj University had appointed him as a distinguished member of the national and international advisory committee to organize ICGB'19 (International Conference on Genome Biology 2019).

== Legacy ==
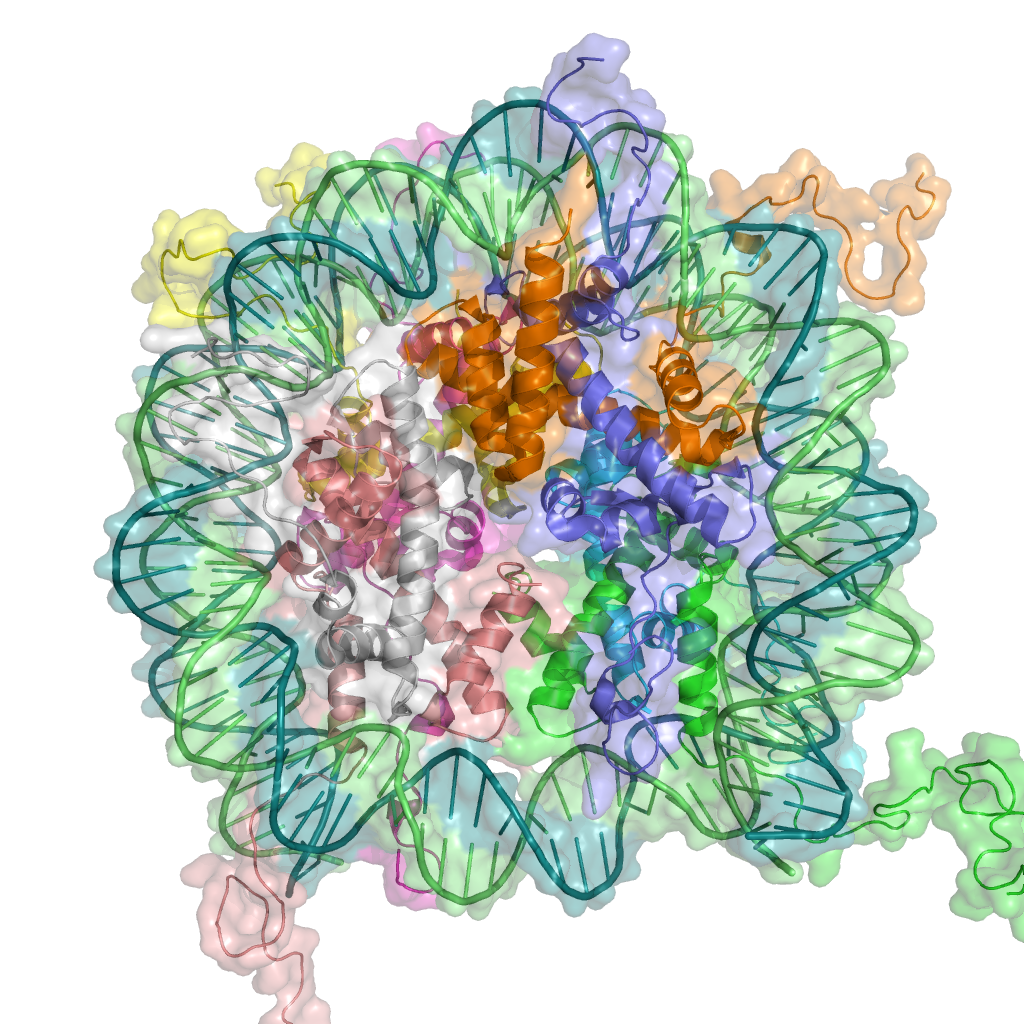
DNA associates with histone proteins to form chromatin

Kundu's researches are principally focused on the regulation of transcription and P53 function using chromatin and associated proteins as well as on the functional genomics of transcriptional co-activators. His researches assisted in the identification of PC4 and its role as a functional component of chromatin and as an activator of P53. He demonstrated the histone chaperone activity and the acetylation of chromatin transcription and these findings have been reported to have helped in identifying new drug candidates. Extending his researches to cancer and AIDS therapeutics, he has identified small molecule modulators of chromatin modifying enzymes, a discovery which is reported to be helpful in developing new therapeutic protocols.

Kundu has published one book, Epigenetics: Development and Disease, and a number of articles in peer-reviewed journals (Note: Please see Selected bibliography section) and Google Scholar, an online article repository, has listed 215 of them. Several of his research findings have been put to commercial use by various companies and he holds several patents for his works which include processes and compounds. He has delivered a number of featured lectures and is one of the organizers of the Asian Forum for the Chromatin and Chromosome Biology, a biennial event for the students and researchers of epigenetics and chromatin biology from Asian countries. He is also involved in popularizing science in the rural areas through science outreach programs and has delivered a series of lectures on Genes, Disease and Therapeutics, with student community as the audience.

== Awards and honors ==
The Council of Scientific and Industrial Research (CSIR) awarded him the Shanti Swarup Bhatnagar Prize, one of the highest Indian science awards in 2005 and he received the National Bioscience Award for Career Development (N-BIOS Prize) from the Department of Biotechnology, the same year. Three years later, he was selected for the National Academy of Sciences, India-Reliance Industries Platinum Jubilee Award in 2008 for his contributions to biological sciences. In 2011, he received the G. D. Birla Award for Scientific Research of the K. K. Birla Foundation and the Ranbaxy Research Award. He is also a recipient of the India Innovation Award 2012 of Merck Millipore.

Kundu, a recipient of the 1993 International Council of Scientific Union Award, is an elected member of the Guha Research Conference and a fellow of the Union for International Cancer Control (2001 and 2005). He was elected as a fellow by the National Academy of Sciences, India in 2005 and he became an elected fellow of the Indian Academy of Sciences and the Indian National Science Academy in 2008 and 2009 respectively. The Department of Science and Technology awarded him the J. C. Bose National Fellowship in 2010 and he has delivered several award orations including the 2010 lecture of the Tohoku Medical Society, Japan. He is also a recipient of Monbukagakusho Scholarship of the Government of Japan (1996), Post-doctoral fellowship of the Human Frontier Science Program (2001) and Collaborative Research fellowship of ARCUS-India (2005–08).

== Selected bibliography ==
=== Books ===
- Tapas Kumar Kundu (13 November 2012). Epigenetics: Development and Disease. Springer Science & Business Media. ISBN 978-94-007-4525-4.

=== Articles ===
- Ontario D Lau; Tapas K Kundu; Raymond E Soccio; Slimane Ait-Si-Ali; Ehab M Khalil; Alex Vassilev; Alan P Wolffe; Yoshihiro Nakatani; Robert G Roeder; Philip A Cole (March 2000). "HATs off: selective synthetic inhibitors of the histone acetyltransferases p300 and PCAF". Molecular Cell. 5 (3): 589–595. doi:10.1016/S1097-2765(00)80452-9. PMID 10882143.
- Tapas K Kundu; Vikas B Palhan; Zhengxin Wang; Woojin An; Philip A Cole; Robert G Roeder (September 2000). "Activator-dependent transcription from chromatin in vitro involving targeted histone acetylation by p300". Molecular Cell. 6 (3): 551–561. doi:10.1016/s1097-2765(00)00054-x. PMID 11030335.
- Ernest Martinez; Vikas B Palhan; Agneta Tjernberg; Elena S Lymar; Armin M Gamper; Tapas K Kundu; Brian T Chait; Robert G Roeder (October 2001). "Human STAGA complex is a chromatin-acetylating transcription coactivator that interacts with pre-mRNA splicing and DNA damage-binding factors in vivo". Molecular and Cellular Biology. 21 (10): 6782–6795. doi:10.1128/MCB.21.20.6782-6795.2001. PMC 99856. PMID 11564863.
- Karanam Balasubramanyam; V Swaminathan; Anupama Ranganathan; Tapas K Kundu (May 2003). "Small molecule modulators of histone acetyltransferase p300". Journal of Biological Chemistry. 278 (21): 19134–19140. doi:10.1074/jbc.M301580200. PMID 12624111.
- Karanam Balasubramanyam; M Altaf; Radhika A Varier; V Swaminathan; Aarti Ravindran; Parag P Sadhale; Tapas K Kundu (August 2004). "Polyisoprenylated benzophenone, garcinol, a natural histone acetyltransferase inhibitor, represses chromatin transcription and alters global gene expression". Journal of Biological Chemistry. 279 (32): 33716–33726. doi:10.1074/jbc.M402839200. PMID 15155757.
- Karanam Balasubramanyam; Radhika A Varier; Mohammed Altaf; Venkatesh Swaminathan; Nagadenahalli B Siddappa; Udaykumar Ranga; Tapas K Kundu (December 2004). "Curcumin, a novel p300/CREB-binding protein-specific inhibitor of acetyltransferase, represses the acetylation of histone/nonhistone proteins and histone acetyltransferase-dependent chromatin transcription". Journal of Biological Chemistry. 279 (49): 51163–51171. doi:10.1074/jbc.M409024200. PMID 15383533.
- V Swaminathan; A Hari Kishore; KK Febitha; Tapas K Kundu (September 2005). "Human histone chaperone nucleophosmin enhances acetylation-dependent chromatin transcription" (PDF). Molecular and Cellular Biology. 25 (17): 7534–7545. doi:10.1128/MCB.25.17.7534-7545.2005. PMC 1190275. PMID 16107701.
- B Ruthrotha Selvi; Dinesh Jagadeesan; BS Suma; G Nagashankar; M Arif; K Balasubramanyam; M Eswaramoorthy; Tapas K Kundu (September 2008). "Intrinsically fluorescent carbon nanospheres as a nuclear targeting vector: delivery of membrane-impermeable molecule to modulate gene expression in vivo". Nano Letters. 8 (10): 3182–3188. Bibcode:2008NanoL...8.3182S. doi:10.1021/nl801503m. PMID 18800851.

== Patents ==
The list may be incomplete.

- Tapas Kumar Kundu; Anne-Laurence Boutillier; Snehajyoti Chatterjee; Muthusamy Eswaramoorthy; Pushpak Mizar; Chantal Mathis; Jean-Christophe Cassel; Romain Neidl; Mohankrishna Dalvoy Vasudevarao; Vedamurthy Bhusainahalli Maheshwarappa (19 April 2016). "Nanosphere-histone acetyltransferase (HAT) activator composition, process and methods thereof". A composition including nanosphere and histone acetyltransferase (HAT) activator - Patent No. 9314539.
- Tapas Kumar Kundu; Eswaramoorthy Muthusamy, Sr.; Ruthrotha Selvi Bharatha Vikru; Dinesh Jagadeesan (19 May 2016). "Intrinsically fluorescent carbon nanospheres and a process thereof". Delivery of active molecules to nucleus - Patent No. 9034387.
- Govindaraju Thimmaiah; Debabrata Maity; Swapan Kumar Pati; Tapas Kumar Kundu; Arun Kumar Manna; Karthigeyan Dhanasekaran (4 February 2014). "Julolidine conjugates and methods for their preparation and use". Compounds that selectively bind to copper ions in a sample and methods of preparation and use - Patent No. 8642764.
- Tapas Kumar Kundu; Mohammed Arif; Kempegowra Mantelingu; Gopinath Kadaganur Srinivasachar (28 June 2012). "Inhibition of Histone Acetyltransferases by CTK7A and Mthods thereof". Method for inhibiting histone acetyltransferases by derivative of curcumin, particularly CTK7A - Patent No. 20120165384.
- Tapas Kumar Kundu; Ruthrotha Selvi Bharatha Vikru; Hari Kishore Annavarapu; Mantelingu Kempegowda (23 August 2011). "Site-specific inhibitors of histone methyltransferase (HMTASE) and process of preparation thereof". compounds of structural formula I as site-specific inhibitors of histone methyltransferase - Patent No. 8003698.
- Tapas Kumar Kundu; Kanchugarakoppal Subbegowda Rangappa; Badi Sri Sailaja; Radhika Ashish Varier; Nanjundaswamy Shivananju (6 July 2010). "Modulators (inhibitors/activators) of histone acetyltransferases". Use of certain benzoic acid and benzamide compounds as modulators of enzymes histone acetyltransferases - Patent No. 7332629.

== See also ==
- Gene expression
- Transcriptome
- Coactivation (Transcription)
- Epigenetics
- Chromatin
- Chaperone (protein)
- M. R. S. Rao
