= Rama Govindarajan =

Indian scientist, professor

- Citizenship: Indian
- Education: IIT Delhi; Drexel University; IISc Bangalore
- Spouse: Sriram Ramaswamy
- Awards: Shanti Swarup Bhatnagar Award (2007)
- Scientific career
- Fields: Fluid Dynamics
- Workplaces: ICTS; JNCASR
- Doctoral advisor: Roddam Narasimha

Rama Govindarajan is an Indian scientist specialized in the field of fluid dynamics. She previously worked at the Engineering Mechanics Unit of the Jawaharlal Nehru Centre for Advanced Scientific Research from 1998 to 2012 and as a professor at the TIFR Hyderabad Centre for Interdisciplinary Sciences from 2012 to 2016. As of 2025, she is working as a senior professor at International Centre for Theoretical Sciences (ICTS), Bengaluru. Govindarajan is a recipient of the Shanti Swarup Bhatnagar Award for the year 2007.

== Education ==
Govindarajan did her undergraduate degree (B.Tech.) in chemical engineering from IIT Delhi in 1984. She got her master's degree (M.S.) in chemical engineering, from Drexel University, Philadelphia, United States in 1986. Her doctoral degree (Ph.D.) thesis was on the subject of aerospace engineering from the Indian Institute of Science Bangalore in 1994. She worked in post-doctoral research in the Department of Aeronautics at Caltech in 1994.

== Career ==
Govindarajan started her career as scientist in the Computational and Theoretical fluid dynamics division of National Aerospace Laboratories, Bangalore, and worked there for a decade from 1988 to 1998. She became a faculty member at the Jawaharlal Nehru Center for Advanced Scientific Research and worked in that position between 1998 and 2012. From 2012 to 2016, she was a professor at the TIFR Centre for Interdisciplinary Sciences. She has published a large number of technical papers in her field of specialization of fluid physics and has also published a few books. Her main research interests relate to instability and transition to turbulence of shear flows, physics of interfacial flows.

== Awards ==
Of the many awards that she has received so far, the most notable is the Shanti Swarup Bhatnagar Award for the year 2007 for her "original contributions to the understanding of instabilities in shear and non-parallel flows, flow entrainment, turbulent transition and small-scale hydraulic jumps". She was also awarded with the Young Scientist award of 1987 and Outstanding Scientist award of 1996 given by the National Aerospace Laboratories. She received the CNR Rao Oration award of 2004 at JNCASR Bangalore.
