= Roddam Narasimha =

Indian scientist (1933–2020)

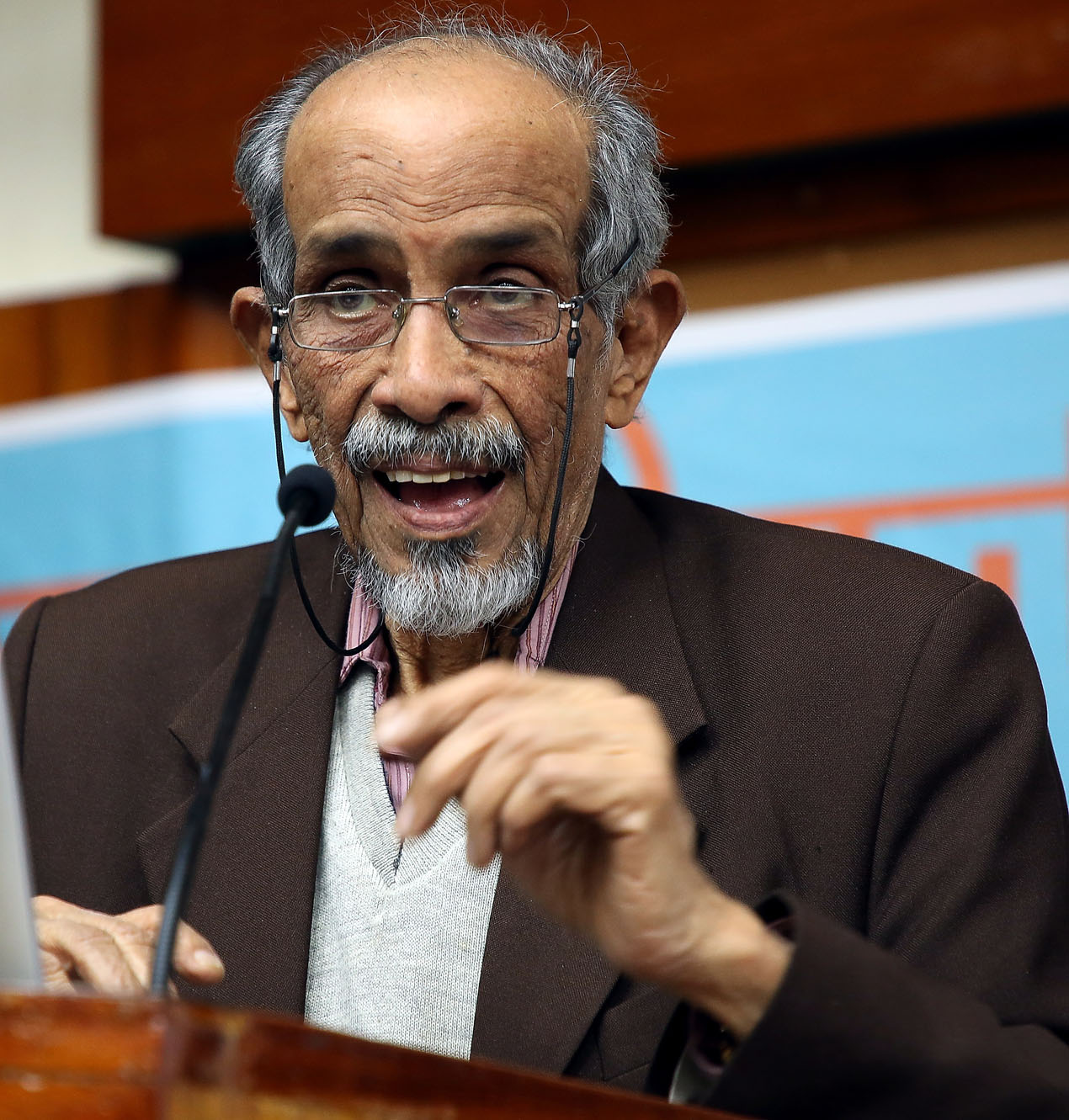
- Born: 20 July 1933
- Died: 14 December 2020 (aged 87); Bangalore, Karnataka, India
- Education: Mysore University; Indian Institute of Science; California Institute of Technology
- Scientific career
- Fields: Fluid dynamics
- Thesis: Some Flow Problems in Rarefied Gas Dynamics (1961)
- Doctoral advisor: Hans W. Liepmann
- Doctoral students: K. R. Sreenivasan; Rama Govindarajan

Roddam Narasimha FRS (20 July 1933 – 14 December 2020) was an Indian aerospace scientist and fluid dynamicist. He was a professor of Aerospace Engineering at the Indian Institute of Science (1962–1999), director of the National Aerospace Laboratories (1984–1993) and the chairman of the Engineering Mechanics Unit at Jawaharlal Nehru Centre for Advanced Scientific Research (JNCASR, 2000–2014). He was the DST Year-of-Science Chair Professor at JNCASR and concurrently held the Pratt & Whitney Chair in Science and Engineering at the University of Hyderabad. Narasimha was awarded the Padma Vibhushan, India's second-highest civilian award, in 2013 for his contributions to advance India's aerospace technology.

== Early life ==
Narasimha was born on 20 July 1933. He was born in a Kannada family tracing its origins to Roddam, a village in the Anantapur district of Andhra Pradesh. His father, R.L. Narasimhaiah, was a professor of physics in Bangalore's Central College, and was also a Kannada language science writer with a focus on physics and astronomy.

Narasimha completed his schooling at Acharya Pathasala in the Gandhi Bazaar neighbourhood of Bangalore. He obtained his graduate degree in mechanical engineering from University of Visvesvaraya College of Engineering in Bangalore, which was affiliated with Mysore University. During this time he visited the Tata Institute (now known as the Indian Institute of Science), where the Spitfire aircraft displayed in the aeronautical department caught his interest. After his graduation in 1953, while he was encouraged by his family members to accept a job with the Indian Railways or with Burmah Shell, but he went on to join the Indian Institute of Science in Bangalore for his master's degree in engineering, which he completed in 1955. During this time he worked with Satish Dhawan, who later chaired the Indian Space Research Organisation. He then went to the United States to complete his PhD in 1961 under Hans Liepmann at the California Institute of Technology.

== Career ==
Narasimha started his research career at Caltech, working on the problem of jet engine noise reduction. After the launch of the Russian Sputnik and the resulting interest in space programs, he shifted focus to rarefied gas and fluid dynamics, working with Hans W. Liepmann. He continued this research at the NASA Jet Propulsion Laboratory, where he went on to study aerodynamics and supersonic flows toward better understanding of the structure of shockwaves. During this time, he worked on one of the space agency's first computers.

He returned to India in 1962, and joined the Indian Institute of Science as a professor in its aeronautical engineering department (1962–1999), where he continued his fluid dynamics research, studying turbulent flow and relaminarisation, including the study of fluid flow from turbulent (chaotic) to laminar (streamlined) forms. In 1970, he was a member of the investigation team under Satish Dhawan that studied the airworthiness of Indian Airlines Avro 748.

He was the ISRO K. R. Ramanathan distinguished professor at the Indian Institute of Science (1994–1999), Director of the National Aerospace Laboratories (1984–1993), Director of the National Institute of Advanced Studies (1997–2004) and the chairman of the Engineering Mechanics Unit at Jawaharlal Nehru Centre for Advanced Scientific Research (JNCASR), Bangalore (2000–2014). He was the DST Year-of-Science Chair Professor at JNCASR and also held the Pratt & Whitney Chair in Science and Engineering at the University of Hyderabad. He was also a visiting member of the faculty at international universities including the University of Brussels, Caltech, University of Cambridge, Langley Research Center, University of Strathclyde and University of Adelaide. He served former Prime Minister Rajiv Gandhi's scientific advisory council.

During his time at the National Aerospace Laboratories, Narasimha led the research initiative into parallel computing as a means to solve fluid dynamics problems. His efforts lead to first parallel computer in India and development of a code for weather prediction of tropical regions. He was also a contributing member to the team that designed the light combat aircraft.

Over the course of his six decade long academic career he has made significant contributions to fundamental and applied fluid dynamics. At the Indian Institute of Science, his research included the 'bursting' phenomenon in a turbulent boundary layer, non-linear vibration of an elastic string, equilibrium and relaxation in turbulent wakes, relaminarization, hydrodynamic instability, wall jets and the study of clouds as volumetrically heated jets. At the Engineering Mechanics Unit of the Jawaharlal Nehru Centre for Advanced Scientific Research, Narasimha continued his research on fluid dynamics of clouds via laboratory experiments as well as numerical simulations. He also studied gas turbine blades, turbulent free shear layers and proposed a novel wing design for turboprop aircraft.

He was the longest-serving member of the Indian Space Commission, a policy-making body for space exploration in India. He resigned from this position in February 2012, in protest at the blacklisting of three former ISRO technocrats including G. Madhavan Nair, former ISRO chairman, for their perceived role in a controversial agreement between ISRO's commercial entity Antrix and Devas Multimedia in 2005.

== Honours ==
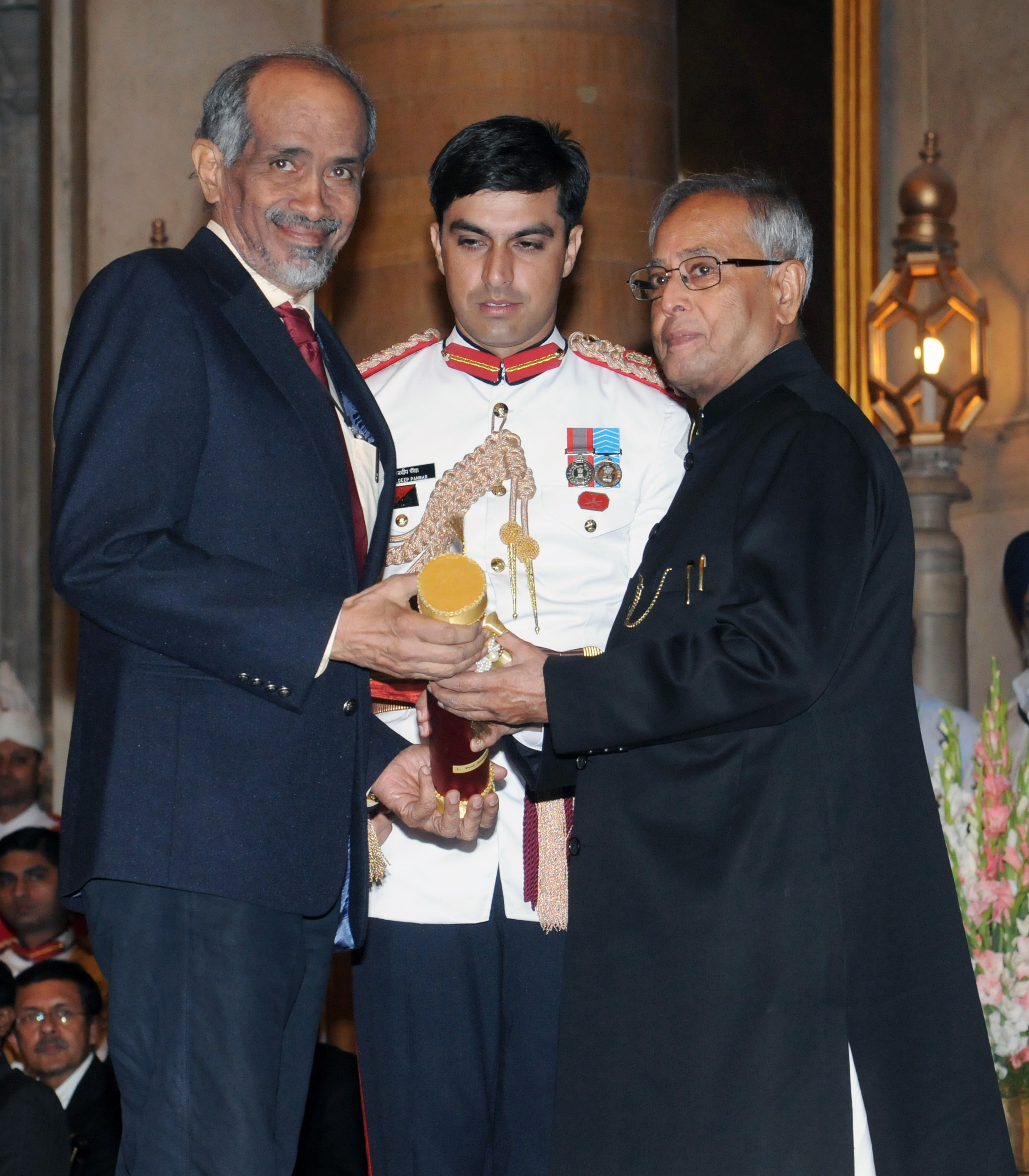
The President, Shri Pranab Mukherjee presenting the Padma Vibhushan Award to Prof. Roddam Narasimha, at an Investiture Ceremony-II, at Rashtrapati Bhavan, in New Delhi on 20 April 2013

Narasimha was an honorary member of the American Academy of Arts and Sciences, and a Fellow of the Royal Society of London, and also of the American Institute of Aeronautics and Astronautics. He was a distinguished alumnus of Caltech and the IISc. He was also a foreign associate of the National Academy of Engineering and the National Academy of Sciences in the United States.

Some of his honours and awards include:

- 1975 – SS Bhatnagar Prize
- 1987 – Padma Bhushan, India's third highest civilian award.
- 1990 – Gujarmal Modi Award
- 1998 – S. Ramanujan Medal, Indian Science Congress
- 2000 – Fluid dynamics Award, American Institute of Aeronautics and Astronautics
- 2008 – Trieste Science Prize, The World Academy of Sciences, Trieste, Italy
- 2009 – Lifetime Achievement Award, Science and Technology Congress, Gulbarga University
- 2013 – Padma Vibhushan, India's second highest civilian award
- 2019 – Lifetime Achievement Award for Mentoring in Science, Nature Magazine

He was the author of more than 200 research publications and fifteen books.

== Personal life ==
Narasimha died on 14 December 2020, from brain haemorrhage at the MS Ramaiah Memorial Hospital in Bangalore. He was 87 and was survived by his wife and daughter.

== Books ==
- Narasimha, Roddam (1961). Orifice Flow at High Knudsen Numbers. Guggenheim Aeronautical Laboratory.
- Narasimha, Roddam (1962). Collisionless Expansion of Gases Into Vacuum. Guggenheim Aeronautical Laboratory.
- Narasimha, Roddam; Ojha, S. K. (1967). Effect of Longitudinal Surface Curvature on Boundary Layers.
- Narasimha, Roddam; Srinivasan, J.; Biswas, S. K. (2003). The Dynamics of Technology: Creation and Diffusion of Skills and Knowledge. SAGE. ISBN 978-0-7619-9670-5.
- Kalam, APJ Abdul; Narasimha, Roddam; Dhawan, Satish (1988). Developments in Fluid Mechanics and Space Technology: Asian Congress of Fluid Mechanics.
