= Amitabh Joshi =

Indian biologist (born 1965)

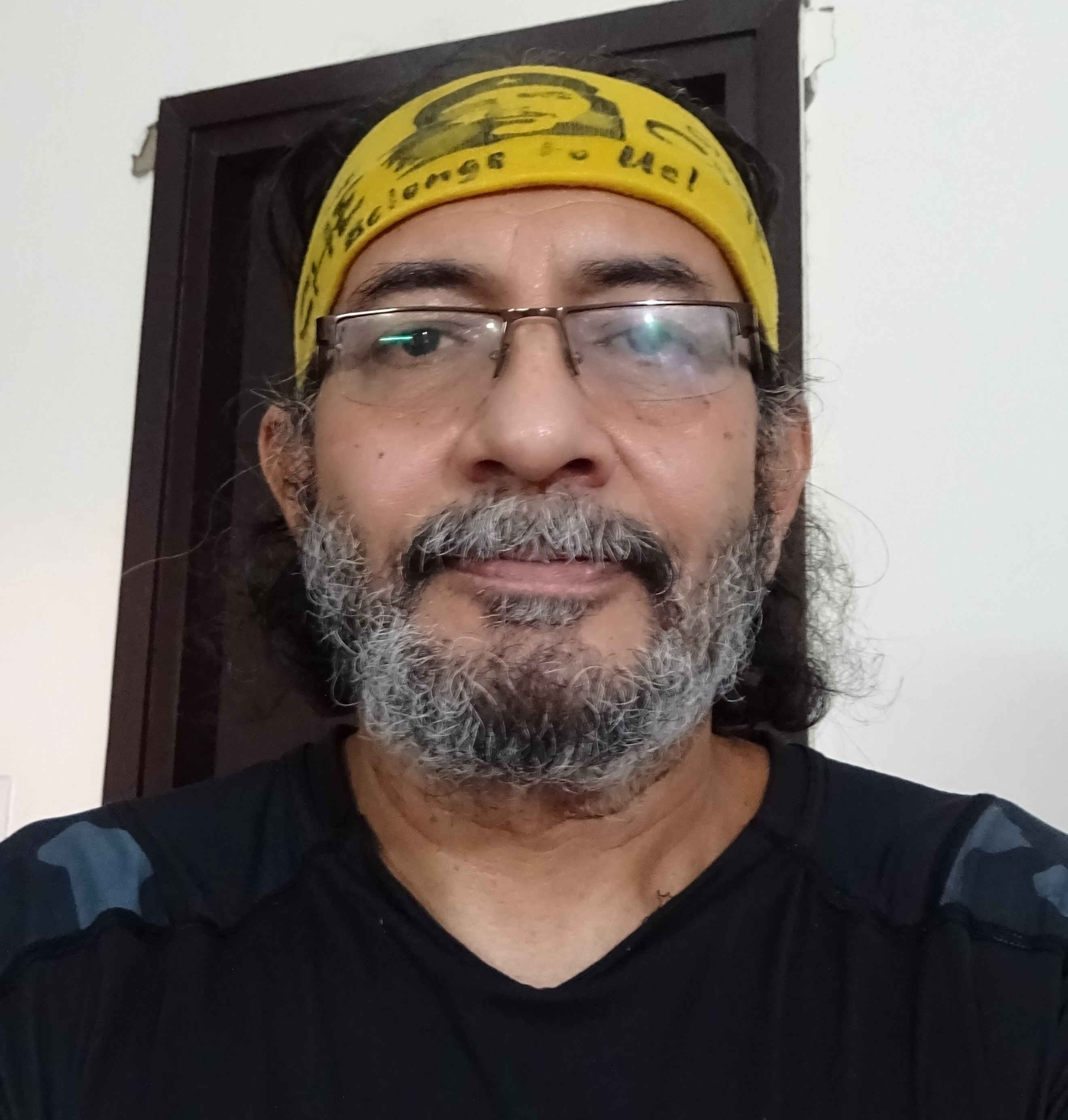
- Joshi in 2022
- Born: 4 March 1965 (age 61); Agra, India
- Education: Delhi University; Washington State University; University of California, Irvine
- Known for: Studies on Population genetics Quantitative genetics Evolutionary genetics Population ecology
- Awards: 2009 Shanti Swarup Bhatnagar Prize; 2010 LSA-IIM Lucknow National Leadership Award
- Scientific career
- Fields: Evolutionary biology; Genetics
- Workplaces: Washington State University; Indian Institute of Science; Jawaharlal Nehru Centre for Advanced Scientific Research; Berlin Institute for Advanced Study
- Doctoral advisor: John N. Thompson; Michael E. Moody; Laurence D. Mueller

Amitabh Joshi (born 1965) is an Indian evolutionary biologist, population ecologist, geneticist and a professor at Jawaharlal Nehru Centre for Advanced Scientific Research (JNCASR). He heads the Evolutionary Biology Laboratory at JNCASR and is known for his studies on Evolutionary genetics and Population ecology. An elected fellow of the Indian Academy of Sciences, National Academy of Sciences, India, and Indian National Science Academy, he was also a J. C. Bose National Fellow (2011-2021) of the Department of Science and Technology. He served as the chief editor of the Journal of Genetics (2008-2014) and Editor of Publications of the Indian Academy of Sciences (2017-2021). The Council of Scientific and Industrial Research, the apex agency of the Government of India for scientific research, awarded him the Shanti Swarup Bhatnagar Prize for Science and Technology, one of the highest Indian science awards, in 2009, for his contributions to biological sciences.

== Biography ==
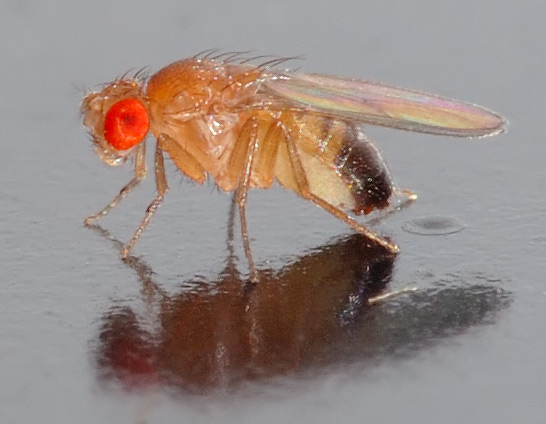
Drosophila melanogaster

Joshi was born on 4 March 1965 to Devi Datt Joshi and Nirmala Joshi (nee Pande) in the Indian city of Agra. He did his schooling in St. Francis Nursery School and St. Peter's College, Agra. He then did his graduation (BSc Hons in Botany, 1982–85, Hindu College, Delhi) and Master's studies (M.Sc. in Genetics,1985–87) from Delhi University South Campus, and moved to Washington State University from where he obtained a PhD in 1993, working with John N. Thompson and Michael E. Moody. His Ph.D. thesis was titled Coevolution and variation in competition between Drosophila species; in addition, his collaboration with Moody resulted in two papers on the cost-of-sex issue, published in the Journal of Theoretical Biology. During this period, he also worked as a research assistant (1987–88) and a teaching assistant at the university (1987–93). He stayed in the US until 1996 to complete his post-doctoral studies in the laboratory of Laurence D. Mueller of the University of California, Irvine and returned to India to work as a visitor at the Centre for Ecological Sciences of Indian Institute of Science for a month. In April 1996, he joined Jawaharlal Nehru Centre for Advanced Scientific Research as a member of faculty at the Animal Behaviour Unit and shifted to Evolutionary and Organismal Biology Unit in 1998 where he rose in rank from a faculty fellow (1998–2001) to an associate professor, reaching the position of a professor in 2007. He heads the Evolutionary Biology Laboratory of the institution where he hosts a number of research scholars. In between, he served as a visiting faculty at the Berlin Institute for Advanced Study in 2001. He is also an adjunct faculty of the Indian Institute of Science Education and Research, Mohali and resides in Bengaluru, in Karnataka.

== Legacy ==
Joshi continues his early researches on Drosophila but has now combined his evolution studies with theoretical work using computer simulations. His researches focuses on the inter-relations between the genetics of organisms and their ecology and the influence of these factors in their evolutionary path. His laboratory studies various evolutionary aspects such as the rate of development, patterns of progeny and ageing and investigates the development of competitive abilities and stress resistance in organisms. His researches have been documented by way of a number of articles (Note: Please see Selected bibliography section) and several of them have been listed by many major online article repositories such as Google Scholar, ResearchGate, Academic Tree and PubFacts. He has also published a book, Stability in Model Populations, co-authored by his post-doctoral guide, Laurence D. Mueller. He is on the list of mentors of doctoral studies at the Indian Institute of Science and has guided several scholars in their researches.

At Jawaharlal Nehru Centre for Advanced Scientific Research, Joshi has served as a member of the Screening Committee for Life Sciences and sat as the convenor of the committee in 1999 and 2000. He is a former member of the Academic Advisory Committee of the Evolutionary and Organismal Biology Unit of JNCASR during 1999–2001 and was the coordinator of the Discussion Meeting on Origin and Evolution of Life, an ISRO-IAS event held in Coorg in 2000. He was also associated in organizing seminars and conferences such as the Association for Tropical Biology-Annual Meeting (Bengaluru 2001), One-Day Symposium on Evolutionary Biology in honour of Stephen Jay Gould (JNCASR 2002), Workshop on Adaptation and Time (JNCASR 2002) and Four Day Lecture Programme on Evolutionary and Organismal Biology (Delhi University 2002). He is a former member of the Vice Chancellor's Empowered Committee for Restructuring the Undergraduate Science Programme of Delhi University (2002–04), Planning Committee of Indian School in Chronobiology (2002), Expert Consultative Committee of the Department of Science and Technology (2004) and Sectional Committee of Indian Academy of Sciences for Animal and Plant Sciences (2004–06) and sits in the Board of Studies in Genetics of Mysore University and Project Advisory Committee for Animal Sciences of Department of Science and Technology. He has been associated with Resonance: Journal of Science Education (editorial board member, associate editor), Journal of Biosciences on the Origin of Life (guest editor 1997–98), Journal of Genetics on Evolutionary genetics: the Drosophila model (guest editor–2003) and the Journal of Genetics (editor). He was also among the 370 scientists who expresses their disapproval of the handling of 2016 JNU protests.

== Awards and honors ==
Joshi was selected as a Young Associate by the Indian Academy of Sciences in 1997 for a period of three years and was elected as its fellow in 2001. The same year, he was elected by Berlin Institute for Advanced Study as a fellow for his project, Life History Evolution in Drosophila. He was elected as a National Academy of Sciences, India fellow in 2002 and the Council of Scientific and Industrial Research awarded him the Shanti Swarup Bhatnagar Prize, one of the highest Indian science awards, in 2009 for his contributions to Biological Sciences. A J. C. Bose National fellow, Joshi was selected for the National Leadership Award of the Lakshmipat Singhania Academy-IIM Lucknow in 2010. In 2011, the Indian National Science Academy elected him as a fellow.

== Selected bibliography ==
=== Books ===
- Laurence D. Mueller; Amitabh Joshi (2000). Stability in Model Populations. Princeton University Press. ISBN 9780691007335.

=== Articles ===
- PUNYATIRTHA DEY; KANIKA MENDIRATTA; JOY BOSE; Amitabh Joshi (July 2016). "Enhancement of larval immune system traits as a correlated response to selection for rapid development in Drosophila melanogaster". Journal of Genetics. 95 (3): 719–723. doi:10.1007/s12041-016-0659-5. PMID 27659343. S2CID 39742982.
- MANASWINI SARANGI; Archana Nagarajan; Snigdhadip Dey; JOY BOSE; Amitabh Joshi (July 2016). "Evolution of increased larval competitive ability in Drosophila melanogaster without increased larval feeding rate". Journal of Genetics. 95 (3): 491–503. doi:10.1007/s12041-016-0656-8. PMID 27659320. S2CID 15418527.
- Archana Nagarajan; SHARMILA BHARATHI NATARAJAN; Mohan Jayaram; ANANDA THAMMANNA; Sudarshan Chari; JOY BOSE; Shreyas Venkataraman Jois; Amitabh Joshi (June 2016). "Adaptation to larval crowding in Drosophila ananassae and Drosophila nasuta nasuta: increased larval competitive ability without increased larval feeding rate". Journal of Genetics. 95 (2): 411–425. doi:10.1007/s12041-016-0655-9. PMID 27350686. S2CID 368124.
- Prasad NG, Dey S, Joshi A, Vidya TN (2015). "Rethinking inheritance, yet again: inheritomes, contextomes and dynamic phenotypes". Journal of Genetics. 94 (3): 367–76. doi:10.1007/s12041-015-0554-5. PMID 26440075. S2CID 8445547.
- Prasad NG, Joshi A (2015). "Remarks on the article on life-history traits in Drosophila populations selected for rapid development by Yadav and Sharma". Journal of Experimental Biology. 218 (2): 326–7. Bibcode:2015JExpB.218..326P. doi:10.1242/jeb.117366. PMID 25609787.
- Dey S, Goswami B, Joshi A (2015). "A possible mechanism for the attainment of out-of-phase periodic dynamics in two chaotic subpopulations coupled at low dispersal rate". Journal of Theoretical Biology. 367: 100–10. doi:10.1016/j.jtbi.2014.11.028. PMID 25497477.
- Prasad NG, Dey S, Joshi A, Vidya TN (2015). "Rethinking inheritance, yet again: inheritomes, contextomes and dynamic phenotypes". Journal of Genetics. 94 (3): 367–76. doi:10.1007/s12041-015-0554-5. PMID 26440075. S2CID 8445547.

== See also ==
- Drosophila melanogaster
- Population ecology
- Modern evolutionary synthesis
- On the Origin of Species
