= V. Nagaraja =

Indian microbiologist (born 1954)

- Born: 16 May 1954 (age 72); Kanyana, Mangaluru, Karnataka, India
- Education: Bangalore University
- Occupation: Professor
- Notable work: Professor at Indian Institute of Science, Bengaluru from 1989-present President of Jawaharlal Nehru Centre for Advanced Scientific Research from 2015–present
- Spouse: Jaya (m. 1986)

V. Nagaraja (born 16 May 1954) is a Professor, Department of Microbiology and Cell Biology, Indian Institute of Science, Bengaluru. He had received his B.Sc. and M.Sc. degrees in the year 1973 and 1975 from the Bangalore University. He completed his Ph.D. in 1981 from Department of Microbiology and Cell Biology at IISc and the work on mycobacteriophage I3 and role of DNA gyrase in mycobacteria set the stage for his later work when he joined the Institute as an assistant professor in 1989. After his PhD in 1981, he was a research associate at Biozentrum, University of Basel, Switzerland (1981–85) and at Department of Biology, University of Rochester, USA(1985–89). He joined in 1989 as an assistant professor, in Centre for Genetic Engineering, IISc and was involved in setting up of the department. He became an associate professor in 1995 at Department of Microbiology and Cell Biology, IISc, Professor in 2000 and served as professor and chairman of the department (2008–2013). He has been appointed president of Jawaharlal Nehru Centre for Advanced Scientific Research (JNCASR) by the Cabinet Committee on Appointments with effect from 14 October 2015.

== Early life and education ==
V. Nagaraja was born in a Kannada-speaking Havyaka Brahmin Family. Nagaraja's father's name is Mahadeva Shastry who was a doctor and mother Parvathi Amma was a housewife His native place is Kanyana a village in Mangaluru, Dakshina Kannada District. He had received his B.Sc. and M.Sc. degrees in 1973 and 1975 from the Bangalore University. He completed his Ph.D. in 1981 from Department of Microbiology and Cell Biology at IISc and the work on mycobacteriophage I3 and role of DNA gyrase in mycobacteria set the stage for his later work when he joined the institute as an assistant professor in 1989.

== Research ==
Nagaraja has done research on DNA topoisomerases, topology modulation, regulation of gene expression to understand the underlying molecular mechanisms and their importance in cellular function. Understanding the biology of the pathogen that causes TB has been a major research effort. As a result, several seminal contributions have been made leading to potential applications. His interaction with industry includes – development of commercial biotech products such as restriction enzymes and other DNA transaction enzymes, design and development of high fidelity restriction enzyme, new inhibitors for the generation of lead molecules as a step for novel therapeutics against tuberculosis. These have been successfully applied and resulted in international patents. Under his guidance, 21 students have completed doctoral degree and 10 students are at various stages of their PhD. In addition, a large number of project assistants, summer fellows and postdoctoral researchers are trained under him.

== Awards and recognition ==
Nagaraja is a Fellow of Indian National Science Academy, Indian Academy of Sciences, National Academy of Sciences, Fellow of TWAS and life member of several science bodies/ societies. He is a recipient of Shanti Swarup Bhatnagar Award (1999), J. C. Bose Fellowship (2008), Srinivasaya Memorial Award, First Product Process and Technology Development Award of DBT(2001), Hon. Professor, Jawaharlal Nehru Centre for Advanced Scientific Research, IISc Alumni Award for Excellence in Research, Ranbaxy Science Foundation Award (2003), Dr. NityaAnanad Endowment Lecture Award of INSA-2009, J. C. Bose Medal of Indian National Science Academy (2010), TWAS Prize in Biology (2011). Recently, he has been awarded with prestigious Sir M. Visvesvaraya state award by government of Karnataka, India.
