= Jawaharlal Nehru Centre for Advanced Scientific Research =

Research institute in Bangalore, India

- Type: Autonomous government institute (deemed university)
- Established: 1989; 37 years ago
- Founder: C. N. R. Rao (Bharat Ratna)
- Chairperson: V. Ramgopal Rao
- President: Umesh V. Waghmare
- Location: JNCASR, Jakkur, Bangalore-560 064, Bengaluru, Karnataka, India; 13°04′05″N 77°36′32″E
- Website: www.jncasr.ac.in
- Location within Karnataka Location within India

The Jawaharlal Nehru Centre for Advanced Scientific Research (JNCASR) is a multidisciplinary research institute located at Jakkur, Bengaluru, India. JNCASR was established by the Department of Science and Technology of the Government of India as a centre for advanced scientific research in India, to mark the birth centenary of Pandit Jawaharlal Nehru, the first prime minister of independent India. In 2019, JNCASR was ranked #7 among the world's top ten research institutes and universities by Nature journal in a normalised ranking of research institutes and universities with high quality output.

== History ==
The Jawaharlal Nehru Centre for Advanced Scientific Research (JNCASR) is an autonomous institution established in 1989 by the Department of Science and Technology, Government of India, to commemorate the birth centenary of Jawaharlal Nehru. Under the visionary leadership of Bharat Ratna Prof. C. N. R. Rao, FRS, as the founding president and with Indian nuclear physicist Dr. Raja Ramanna as its first Chairman, JNCASR was initially registered as a society. The institution began its journey on the Indian Institute of Science campus in Bengaluru before moving to its own campus at Jakkur, Bengaluru, inaugurated on 4 March 1995, by then Vice President of India, Shri K. R. Narayanan. Originally spread over 15.55 acres, the Jakkur campus now spans 27.35 acres and houses comprehensive infrastructure, including specialized laboratories for Surface Science and Solid State Chemistry, advanced instruments like the Transmission Electron Microscope, and facilities such as an administration block, academic and outreach buildings, a dining hall, a health centre, a daycare, and residential quarters for students and staff. The JNCASR campus and its iconic Buckyball structure were designed by the famous Indian architect Charles Correa. Additionally, JNCASR has expanded to include the 10-acre Chamundi campus in Chokkanahalli, serving as the academic hub, and the Sahyadri campus in Jakkur, which provides accommodations for post-doctoral researchers and visiting students. Furthering its mission to integrate science with societal development, the foundation stone for the Innovation & Development Centre at the Arkavathi Campus in Shivanapura was laid in 2021 by Vice President Shri Venkaiah Naidu.

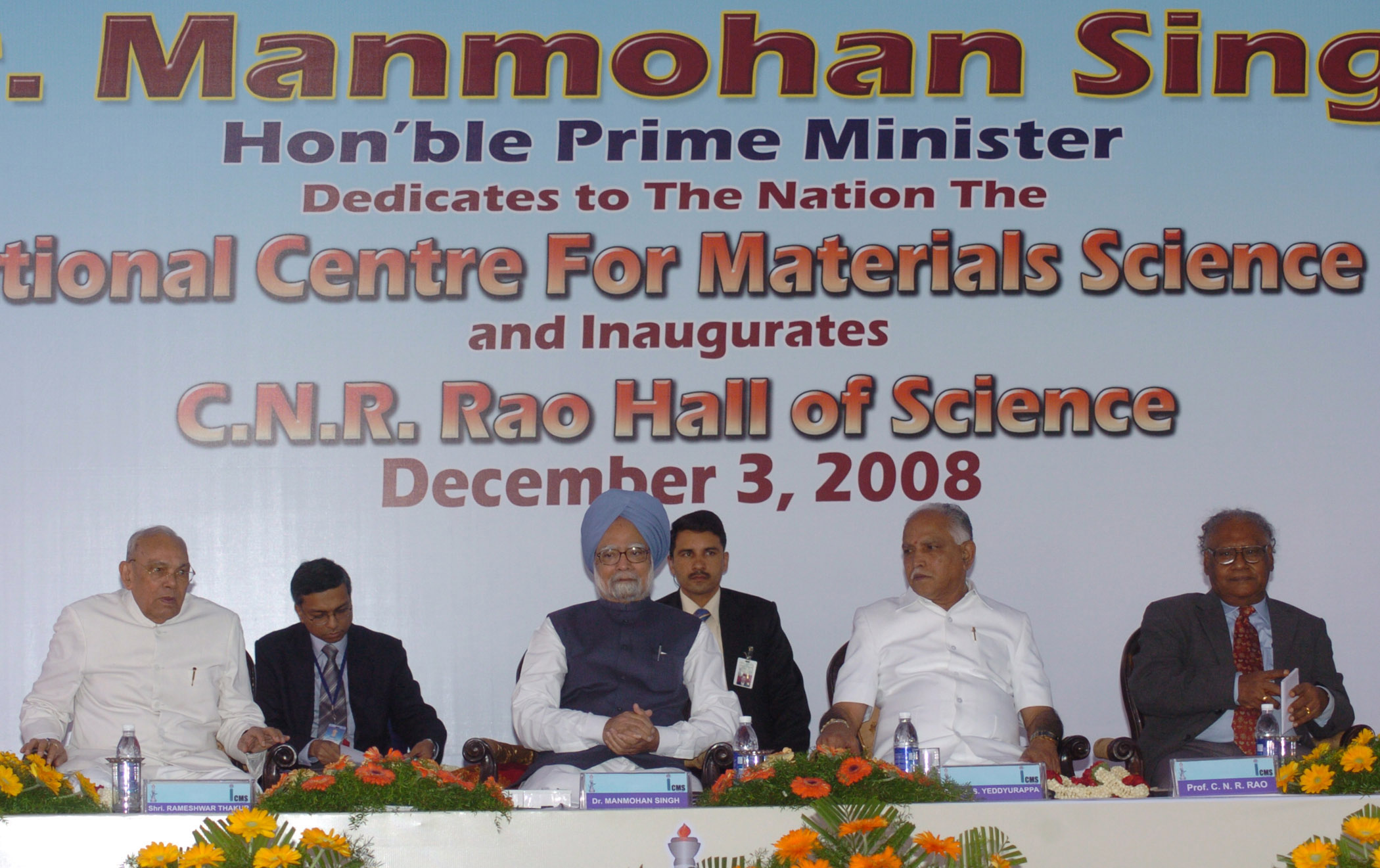
The prime minister of India, Dr. Manmohan Singh and Prof. C.N.R. Rao during the inauguration of International Centre for Materials Science at JNCASR, Bangalore

== Academics ==
Researchers at the centre are divided into seven units: Chemistry and Physics of Materials, Engineering Mechanics, Evolutionary and Organismal Biology, Molecular Biology and Genetics, Neuroscience, New Chemistry, Theoretical Sciences, Education Technology and Geodynamics. There are two off-campus units: Chemical Biology and Condensed Matter Theory in JVH, Indian Institute of Science (IISc). JNCASR has a faculty-to-student ratio of about 1:4 and state-of-the-art experimental, computational and infrastructural facilities. It offers Ph.D. programmes, Integrated Ph.D. (post-bachelor's degree) and M.Sc. programmes in various disciplines. The small size of the institute (currently about 53 faculty members and ~300 students) fosters interdisciplinary collaborations. It is a "deemed university", i.e., it awards its own degrees. Apart from training its own students through a wide spectrum of courses, the centre's Summer Research Fellowship programme (SRFP) hosts some of the brightest undergraduates in the country; the Educational Technology Unit produces teaching aids and educational material, the centre organises and teaches short-term courses at universities across India, and trains promising young chemists and biologists as part of the programmes of Project-Oriented-Chemical-Education (POCE) and Project-Oriented-Biological-Education (POBE).

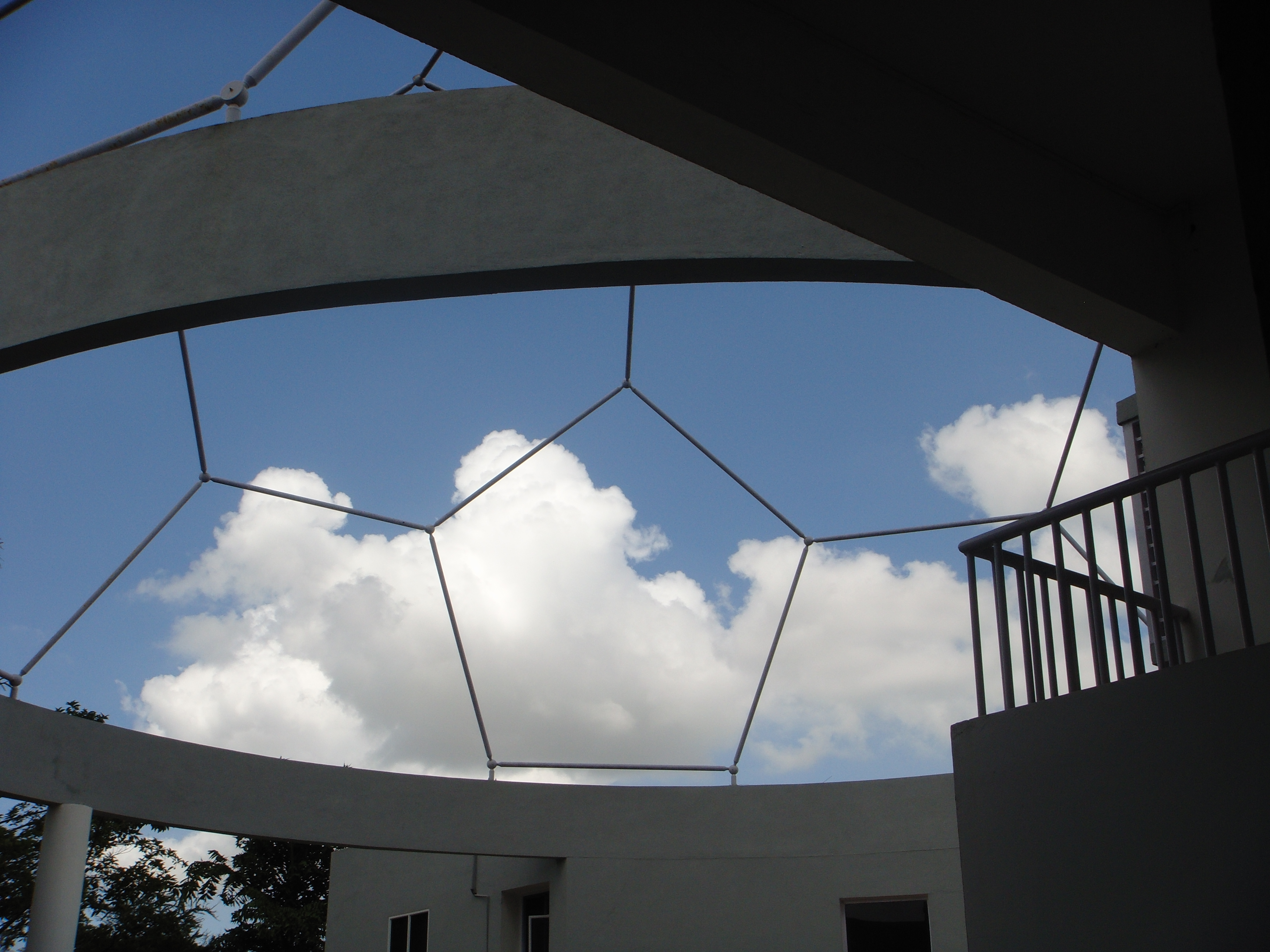
Buckyball designed by the famous Indian architect Charles Correa at the Molecular Biology and Genetics Unit (MBGU) building, JNCASR

== Elected Honorary Fellows of JNCASR ==
The following is a list of Honorary Fellows of the Jawaharlal Nehru Centre for Advanced Scientific Research (JNCASR).

- Dr. Ashok Ganguly, CBE (1995), Chairman of Hindustan Lever and member of Rajya Sabha
- Shri K. R. Narayanan (1995), 10th President of India
- Dr. Raja Ramanna (1995), Indian physicist and first chairman of JNCASR
- Shri C. Subramanian (1998), Indian statesman
- Shri N. R. Narayana Murthy (1999), founder of Infosys
- Bharat Ratna Prof. C. N. R. Rao (2000), eminent chemist and founder-president of JNCASR
- Prof. M. M. Sharma (2003), chemical engineer
- Prof. Arcot Ramachandran (2005), scientist and educator
- Prof. S. Varadarajan (2006), chemist
- Prof. M. S. Swaminathan (2009), agricultural scientist
- Shri Kapil Sibal (2010), Indian politician and lawyer
- Dr. Manmohan Singh (2010), 13th Prime Minister of India
- Prof. Anthony K. Cheetham (2012), material scientist
- H. H. Sheikh Saud Al Qasimi (2013), ruler of Ras Al Khaimah, UAE
- Dr. Kiran Mazumdar-Shaw (2015), founder of Biocon
- Prof. Michael L. Klein (2015), chemist

== Notable faculty members ==
- C. N. R. Rao, FRS, Bharat Ratna, Founder & Honorary President and Professor at New Chemistry Unit
- The late Roddam Narasimha, Padma Vibhushan, Professor at Engineering Mechanics Unit
- The late Khadg Singh Valdiya, Padma Bhushan, Professor at Geodynamics Unit
- The late M. R. S. Rao, Padma Shri, Former President (2003-2013) and DST-Year of Science Professor at Molecular Biology and Genetics Unit
- Umesh Waghmare, Physicist Infosys Prize Laureate, Shanti Swarup Bhatnagar Award President, Jawaharlal Nehru Centre for Advanced Scientific Research (JNCASR), Bangalore
- V. Nagaraja, Recipient of Shanti Swarup Bhatnagar Prize for Science and Technology, Former President, Jawaharlal Nehru Centre for Advanced Scientific Research (JNCASR), Bangalore
- Maneesha S. Inamdar, Professor at the Molecular Biology and Genetics Unit and Director at DBT-Institute for Stem Cell Science and Regenerative Medicine (inStem), Bangalore
- G. U. Kulkarni, received the B. M. Birla Science Prize. Former President, Jawaharlal Nehru Centre for Advanced Scientific Research (JNCASR), Bangalore
- T Govindaraju, Recipient of Shanti Swarup Bhatnagar Prize for chemical sciences and Professor at New Chemistry Unit
- Rama Govindarajan one of the recipient of Shanti Swarup Bhatnagar Award
- Swapan Kumar Pati, recipient of Shanti Swarup Bhatnagar Award
- Amitabh Joshi, evolutionary biologist, geneticist . Recipient of Shanti Swarup Bhatnagar Prize for Science and Technology, 2006
- Tapas Kumar Kundu, recipient of Shanti Swarup Bhatnagar Prize for Science and Technology, Professor at Molecular Biology and Genetics Unit, and former director, CSIR-Central Drug Research Institute, Lucknow
- Shobhana Narasimhan, physicist, professor in the Theoretical Sciences Unit, Fellow of the American Physical Society and International Honorary Member of the American Academy of Arts and Sciences.
- Srikanth Sastry, recipient of Shanti Swarup Bhatnagar Prize for Science and Technology, Professor of Theoretical Sciences, Fellow of the American Physical Society.
- Kaustuv Sanyal, molecular biologist, mycologist and professor at the Molecular Biology and Genetics Unit, and director of Bose Institute, Kolkata
- Balasubramanian Sundaram recipient the Shanti Swarup Bhatnagar Award
- Chandrabhas Narayana, Professor at Chemistry and Physics of Materials Unit, and director, Rajiv Gandhi Centre for Biotechnology, Thiruvananthapuram
- Tapas Kumar Maji, recipient the Shanti Swarup Bhatnagar Award
- Subi J George, recipient the Shanti Swarup Bhatnagar Award
- T Govindaraju, recipient the Shanti Swarup Bhatnagar Award
- Rajesh Ganapathy, recipient the Shanti Swarup Bhatnagar Award
