= Thimmaiah Govindaraju =

Academic

T Govindaraju is a professor in the Bioorganic Chemistry Laboratory at Jawaharlal Nehru Centre for Advanced Scientific Research, Bengaluru. The researchers in the Bioorganic Chemistry Laboratory work in areas which lie at the intersection of chemistry, biology and biomaterials science, and in particular, on problems related to Alzheimer's disease, peptide chemistry, molecular probes, molecular architectonics, nanoarchitectonics and biomimetics.

Govindaraju secured his MSc degree from Bangalore University in 2000 and PhD degree from National Chemical Laboratory, Pune in 2005. He also worked as a Postdoctoral Fellow at University of Wisconsin-Madison, Madison, USA during 2005-06 and Alexander von Humboldt Foundation Research Fellow at Max Planck Institute of Molecular Physiology, Dortmund, Germany during 2006–08.

== Honours and awards ==
The honours and awards conferred on Govindaraju include:

- 2022 Asian Scientist 100, Asian Scientist
- 2021 Shanti Swarup Bhatnagar Prize for chemical sciences
- 2021 Fellow of Royal Society of Chemistry (London)
- 2019 CDRI Award for Excellence in Drug Research, CSIR-Central Drug Research Institute, Lucknow, India
- 2017 IPS-Young Scientist Award (2017), Indian Peptide Society
- 2017 MRSI Medal (2017), Materials Research Society of India
- 2016 SwarnaJayanti Fellowship (2015-2016), the Department of Science and Technology, Govt of India
- 2015 Sir C V Raman Young Scientist Award (2014), Govt of Karnataka
- 2015 CRSI Bronze Medal, Chemical Research Society of India (CRSI) for the year 2016
- 2011 INSA Medal for Young Scientist (2011): Indian National Science Academy, New Delhi
- 2011 Innovative Young Biotechnologist Award: Department of Biotechnology, Ministry of Science and Technology, Govt of India
