= Umesh Waghmare =

Indian physicist

Umesh Vasudeo Waghmare FNA, FASc, FNAE, MRSI Medalist
- Born: 19 September 1968 (age 57); Dhule, India
- Education: Indian Institute of Technology Bombay (BTech); Yale University (MS, MPhil, PhD)
- Known for: Theory, Modeling and Simulations of Condensed Matter and Materials
- Awards: Shanti Swarup Bhatnagar Prize (2010); Infosys Science Prize (2015); GD Birla Award (2016); Outstanding Materials Scientist of the Year, MRS-India (2024); IBM Faculty Award (2009); B.M. Birla Science Prize (2005); JC Bose National Fellowship (2012); MRSI Medal (2005)
- Scientific career
- Fields: Condensed Matter Physics, Materials Science, Theoretical Physics
- Workplaces: Jawaharlal Nehru Centre for Advanced Scientific Research (President); Harvard University; Temple University; Tata Institute of Fundamental Research; Purdue University
- Website: www.jncasr.ac.in/waghmare

Umesh Waghmare (born 19 September 1968) is an Indian physicist, and presently a Professor in the Theoretical Sciences Unit at Jawaharlal Nehru Centre for Advanced Scientific Research. In July 2026, he was also appointed Secretary, Department of Science and Technology (India), Government of India by the Appointments Committee of the Cabinet.

Research in his Materials Theory Group is fundamentally based on computer simulations of electronic motion governed by quantum physics and resulting electron-mediated inter-atomic interactions which are responsible for multi-scale behaviour of materials. Deriving material-specific information on chemical bonding, microscopic degrees of freedom and their couplings that are essential to the specific properties of a material, they develop a model that is used to achieve fundamental understanding of a material in terms of its atomic structure and electronic structure. The goal of their theoretical analysis is to derive material-specific properties on the macroscopic and intermediate length and timescales starting from a first principles description of chemistry and atomic structure.

They complement experimental work by accessing the microscopic information that may be hard to access in a laboratory. Their work has led to design of new materials or modification of existing materials to yield desired properties, or narrowing down the choices of new materials for design by experiment. Recently, they have shown how techniques of machine learning can be constrained by dimensional analysis and physical laws to develop simple and predictive models that benefit from both the data and existing knowledge.

== Career ==
- 2026 – Present: Secretary, Department of Science and Technology (India), Government of India
- 2025 – Present: President, Jawaharlal Nehru Centre for Advanced Scientific Research (JNCASR), Bangalore
- 2022 – 2024: President, Indian Academy of Sciences, Bangalore
- 2000 – Present: Faculty Member, Jawaharlal Nehru Centre for Advanced Scientific Research, Bangalore
  - Roles include Professor, Dean (Faculty & Academic), and Adjunct Faculty at Temple University and Tata Institute of Fundamental Research
- 1998 – 2000: Research Associate, Harvard University, Department of Physics
- 1996 – 1998: Post-doctoral Fellow, Harvard University, Department of Physics
- 1996: Ph.D. in Applied Physics, Yale University, New Haven
- 1994: M.S. and M.Phil. in Applied Physics, Yale University, New Haven
- 1990: B.Tech. in Engineering Physics (Institute Silver Medal), Indian Institute of Technology Bombay

== Awards ==
- 2024: Outstanding Materials Scientist of the Year, Materials Research Society of India (MRS-India)<re
- 2022: Distinguished Lectureship, Materials Research Society (USA)
- 2017: Distinguished Alumnus Award, Indian Institute of Technology Bombay
- 2017: Asian Scientist 100, Asian Scientist
- 2016: GD Birla Award for Scientific Research, KK Birla Foundation
- 2015: Infosys Prize in Engineering and Computer Science
- 2010: Shanti Swarup Bhatnagar Prize for Science and Technology for contributions to the physical sciences
- 2005: B. M. Birla Science Prize in Physics
- 2005: Materials Research Society of India Medal
