= Tapas Kumar Maji =

Indian academic

Tapas Kumar Maji is a professor in the Chemistry and Physics of Materials Unit at Jawaharlal Nehru Centre for Advanced Scientific Research, Bengaluru with research interests in topics related to porous materials, nanoscale metal-organic frameworks and composites and functional gel materials. Maji obtained his MSc degree in inorganic chemistry from Burdwan University in 1997 and PhD degree from Indian Association for the Cultivation of Science in 2002. He did a post-doctoral fellowship at Kyoto University, Japan (2003–05).

== Honours and awards ==
The honours and awards conferred on Maji include

- Asian Scientist 100, Asian Scientist, 2020
- Shanti Swarup Bhatnagar Prize for chemical sciences in 2019
- Fellow of Royal Society of Chemistry (2019)
- Fellow of Indian Academy of Sciences (2018)
- Alexander von Humboldt Fellow for senior researcher by AVH Foundation, Bonn, Germany (2015).
- Materials Research Society of India Medal for contributions in Materials Science (2014)
- National Academy of Sciences, India-Scopus young scientist award in Chemistry (2012)
- Young Associate of Third World Academy of Sciences (TWAS) (2012–2017)
- Young Investigators in Chemical Sciences by journal of Chemical Communications (2011)
