= Balasubramanian Sundaram =

Indian chemist

Balasubramanian Sundaram is an Indian chemist. He holds a position at the Jawaharlal Nehru Centre for Advanced Scientific Research in Bangalore.

In 2011, he was awarded the Shanti Swarup Bhatnagar Prize for Science and Technology, the highest science award in India, in the chemical sciences category.
