= Srikanth Sastry =

Indian physicist

- Born: 1 May 1964 (age 62)
- Scientific career
- Fields: Physics

Srikanth Sastry is an Indian physicist. He is a Boston University alumnus and he along with Raghunathan Srianand were awarded the Shanti Swarup Bhatnagar Prize for Science and Technology in physical sciences in 2008.

Sastry received his PhD from Boston University in 1993 under supervision of H. Eugene Stanley. Since then he has held roles as a postdoctoral researcher at the National Institutes of Health and at Princeton University. In 1998 he became faculty fellow at Jawaharlal Nehru Centre for Advanced Scientific Research and since 2003 he has held a position as associate professor at Jawaharlal Nehru Centre for Advanced Scientific Research. He is currently a professor at the Theoretical Science Unit, Jawaharlal Nehru Centre for Advanced Scientific Research, Jakkur campus, Bangalore.

Sastry's research interests are:

- Slow dynamics in super cooled liquids and glass transition
- Metastable liquids
- Phase transitions and kinetics of phase transformation
- Statistical geometry
- Anomalous thermodynamic and dynamic properties of water and other network forming liquids
- Statistical mechanics of biomolecular systems.

== Recognition ==
Sastry is the recipient of

- Swarnajayanthi Fellowship:
- Shanti Swarup Bhatnagar Awards 2008:
- Fellow of the American Physical Society, 2022
