= Julolidine =

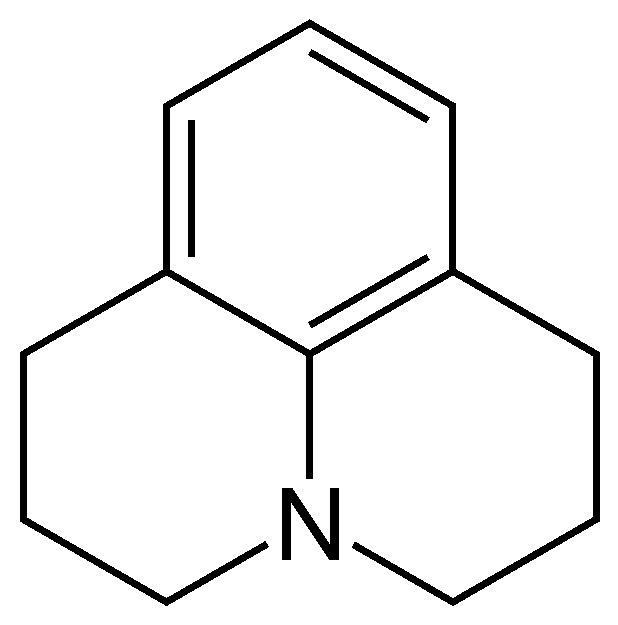
- Diagram showing structure of julolidine

Names
- Preferred IUPAC name 2,3,6,7-Tetrahydro-1H,5H-pyrido[3,2,1-ij]quinoline

Identifiers
CAS Number	479-59-4
3D model (JSmol)	Interactive image
ChemSpider	61383
ECHA InfoCard	100.006.851
PubChem CID	68069
UNII	8ERL3KJ6GQ
CompTox Dashboard (EPA)	DTXSID0060060
- InChI: InChI=1S/C12H15N/c1-4-10-6-2-8-13-9-3-7-11(5-1)12(10)13/h1,4-5H,2-3,6-9H2 Key: DZFWNZJKBJOGFQ-UHFFFAOYSA-N
- SMILES: c13c2c(ccc1)CCCN2CCC3

Properties
Chemical formula	C_{12}H_{15}N
Molar mass	173.259 g·mol^{−1}
Density	1.003 g/mL
Melting point	35 °C (95 °F; 308 K)
Refractive index (n_{D})	1.568

Hazards
Flash point	110 °C (230 °F; 383 K)
- Except where otherwise noted, data are given for materials in their standard state (at 25 °C [77 °F], 100 kPa). verify (what is ?) Infobox references

Julolidine is a heterocyclic aromatic organic compound. It has the formula C_{12}H_{15}N.

== Synthesis ==
The first synthesis of julolidine was first reported by G. Pinkus in 1892.

== Applications ==
This compound and its derivatives have found recent interest as photoconductive materials, chemiluminescence substances, chromogenic substrates in analytical redox reactions, dye intermediates, potential antidepressants and tranquilizers, nonlinear optical materials, high sensitivity photopolymerizable materials, and for improving color stability in photography.
