= Fayaz A. Malik =

Indian pharmacologist

- Born: India
- Known for: Studies involve understanding the regulation of Cancer Stem Cells during tumor metastasis in Breast Cancer and discovery of new targets and target based therapeutic agents addressing drug resistant cancers.
- Scientific career
- Fields: Pharmacology; Cancer Stem Cell Biology
- Workplaces: Indian Institute of Integrative Medicine

Dr. Fayaz Ahmad Malik is an Indian pharmacologist, cancer biologist and a scientist at the Indian Institute of Integrative Medicine of the Council of Scientific and Industrial Research. He is known for his studies on investigating the regulatory mechanisms of Cancer Stem Cells during tumor metastasis. His studies also involve the identification of signaling networks conferring resistance to current anti-cancer therapies. His discovery of new anticancer agents holds a number of patents for the processes he has developed. The Department of Biotechnology of the Government of India awarded him the National Bioscience Award for Career Development, one of the highest Indian science awards, for his contributions to Biosciences, in 2014.

The Department of Science and Technology (DST) of the Government of India awarded him the Swaranajayanti Fellowship, one of the prestigious Fellowship awards, for his advanced research in cancer biology, in 2013-14. Council of Scientific and Industrial Research felicitated him with CSIR-Young Scientist Award (CSIR-YSA) in 2009. In 2010 Government of Jammu and Kashmir also awarded him with Young Scientist Award in Biological Sciences.

== Biography ==
Fayaz Malik, after securing a master's degree in biotechnology and a PhD,. He started his career by joining the Indian Institute of Integrative Medicine of the Council of Scientific and Industrial Research where he is a senior scientist of the Cancer Research and Drug Discovery group. His major research focus remains to understand the critical regulatory biological mechanisms predisposed to the failure of current therapies, acquired resistance, and the onset of metastasis by exploring cellular catabolic machinery and regulatory networks of Cancer Stem Cells in subtypes of breast cancer. He has also developed many processes for which he holds the patents. His studies have been documented by way of a number of articles (Note: Please see Selected bibliography section) and Google Scholar, an online repository of scientific articles has listed 70 of them. Besides, he has contributed chapters to books published by others. He has also participated in various seminars and conferences to give invited speeches.

== Awards and honors ==
Malik received the Young Scientist of Year Award from the Council of Scientific and Industrial Research in 2009 and Young Scientist Awards from Jammu and Kashmir Government in 2010 The Department of Biotechnology (DBT) of the Government of India awarded him the National Bioscience Award for Career Development, one of the highest Indian science awards in 2014. Malik has been bestowed with several other international awards and fellowships in various conferences and workshops.

== Selected bibliography ==
=== Research Articles ===
- Korkaya, Hasan; Kim, Gwang-il; Davis, April; Malik, Fayaz; Henry, N. Lynn; Ithimakin, Suthinee; Quraishi, Ahmed A.; Tawakkol, Nader; D'Angelo, Rosemarie; Paulson, Amanda K.; Chung, Susan; Luther, Tahra; Paholak, Hayley J.; Liu, Suling; Hassan, Khaled A.; Zen, Qin; Clouthier, Shawn G.; Wicha, Max S. (August 2012). "Activation of an IL6 Inflammatory Loop Mediates Trastuzumab Resistance in HER2+ Breast Cancer by Expanding the Cancer Stem Cell Population". Molecular Cell. 47 (4): 570–584. doi:10.1016/j.molcel.2012.06.014. PMC 3432419. PMID 22819326.
- Kim, G; Ouzounova, M; Quraishi, A A; Davis, A; Tawakkol, N; Clouthier, S G; Malik, F; Paulson, A K; D'Angelo, R C (17 February 2014). "SOCS3-mediated regulation of inflammatory cytokines in PTEN and p53 inactivated triple negative breast cancer model". Oncogene. 34 (6): 671–680. doi:10.1038/onc.2014.4. PMC 4285772. PMID 24531711.
- Pathania, Anup S.; Guru, Santosh K.; Kumar, Suresh; Kumar, Ashok; Ahmad, Masroor; Bhushan, Shashi; Sharma, Parduman R.; Mahajan, Priya; Shah, Bhahwal A.; Sharma, Simmi; Nargotra, Amit; Vishwakarma, Ram; Korkaya, Hasan; Malik, Fayaz (29 September 2016). "Interplay between cell cycle and autophagy induced by boswellic acid analog". Scientific Reports. 6 (1) 33146. Bibcode:2016NatSR...633146P. doi:10.1038/srep33146. PMC 5041107. PMID 27680387.
- Ithimakin, S.; Day, K. C.; Malik, F.; Zen, Q.; Dawsey, S. J.; Bersano-Begey, T. F.; Quraishi, A. A.; Ignatoski, K. W.; Daignault, S.; Davis, A.; Hall, C. L.; Palanisamy, N.; Heath, A. N.; Tawakkol, N.; Luther, T. K.; Clouthier, S. G.; Chadwick, W. A.; Day, M. L.; Kleer, C. G.; Thomas, D. G.; Hayes, D. F.; Korkaya, H.; Wicha, M. S. (26 February 2013). "HER2 Drives Luminal Breast Cancer Stem Cells in the Absence of HER2 Amplification: Implications for Efficacy of Adjuvant Trastuzumab". Cancer Research. 73 (5): 1635–1646. doi:10.1158/0008-5472.CAN-12-3349. PMC 3600586. PMID 23442322.
- Pathania, Anup S; Wani, Zahoor A; Guru, Santosh K; Kumar, Suresh; Bhushan, Shashi; Korkaya, Hasan; Seals, Darren F; Kumar, Ajay; Mondhe, Dilip M; Ahmed, Zabeer; Chandan, Bal K; Malik, Fayaz (2015). "The anti-angiogenic and cytotoxic effects of the boswellic acid analog BA145 are potentiated by autophagy inhibitors". Molecular Cancer. 14 (1): 6. doi:10.1186/1476-4598-14-6. PMC 4509694. PMID 25608686.
- Wadhwa, Bhumika; Makhdoomi, Ubaid; Vishwakarma, Ram; Malik, Fayaz (July 2017). "Protein kinase B". Anti-Cancer Drugs. 28 (6): 569–580. doi:10.1097/CAD.0000000000000496. PMID 28379898. S2CID 52887047.
- Kumar, S.; Guru, S K; Pathania, A S; Kumar, A.; Bhushan, S.; Malik, F. (1 October 2013). "Autophagy triggered by magnolol derivative negatively regulates angiogenesis". Cell Death & Disease. 4 (10): e889. doi:10.1038/cddis.2013.399. PMC 3920944. PMID 24176847.
- Pathania, Anup Singh; Guru, Santosh Kumar; Verma, M.K.; Sharma, Chetna; Abdullah, Sheikh Tasduq; Malik, Fayaz; Chandra, Suresh; Katoch, Meenu; Bhushan, Shashi (2013). "Disruption of the PI3K/AKT/mTOR signaling cascade and induction of apoptosis in HL-60 cells by an essential oil from Monarda citriodora". Food and Chemical Toxicology. 62: 246–254. doi:10.1016/j.fct.2013.08.037. PMID 23994707.
- Ke, Jia; Zhao, Zhiju; Hong, Su-Hyung; Bai, Shoumin; He, Zhen; Malik, Fayaz; Xu, Jiahui; Zhou, Lei; Chen, Weilong; Martin-Trevino, Rachel; Wu, Xiaojian; Lan, Ping; Yi, Yongju; Ginestier, Christophe; Ibarra, Ingrid; Shang, Li; McDermott, Sean; Luther, Tahra; Clouthier, Shawn G.; Wicha, Max S.; Liu, Suling (4 February 2015). "Role of microRNA221 in regulating normal mammary epithelial hierarchy and breast cancer stem-like cells". Oncotarget. 6 (6): 3709–21. doi:10.18632/oncotarget.2888. PMC 4414148. PMID 25686829.
- Malik, Fayaz; Korkaya, Hasan; Clouthier, Shawn G.; Wicha, Max S. (12 October 2012). "Breast Cancer Heterogeneity: Need to Review Current Treatment Strategies". Current Breast Cancer Reports. 4 (4): 225–231. doi:10.1007/s12609-012-0093-5. S2CID 72596197.
- Guru, Santosh Kumar; Pathania, Anup Singh; Kumar, Suresh; Ramesh, Deshidi; Kumar, Manjeet; Rana, Satiander; Kumar, Ajay; Malik, Fayaz; Sharma, P. R.; Chandan, B. K.; Jaglan, Sundeep; Sharma, J. P.; Shah, Bhahwal Ali; Tasduq, Sheikh Abdullah; Lattoo, Surrinder K.; Faruk, Abdul; Saxena, A. K.; Vishwakarma, R. A.; Bhushan, Shashi (15 July 2015). "Secalonic Acid-D Represses HIF1α/VEGF-Mediated Angiogenesis by Regulating the Akt/mTOR/p70S6K Signaling Cascade". Cancer Research. 75 (14): 2886–2896. doi:10.1158/0008-5472.CAN-14-2312. PMID 25977334.
- Khajuria, Anamika; Gupta, Amit; Singh, Surjeet; Malik, Fayaz; Singh, Jaswant; Suri, K.A.; Satti, N.K.; Qazi, G.N.; Srinivas, V.K. (2007). "RLJ-NE-299A: A new plant based vaccine adjuvant". Vaccine. 25 (14): 2706–2715. doi:10.1016/j.vaccine.2006.06.036. PMID 16872726.

=== Books/Chapters ===
- Malik, Fayaz; Korkaya, Hasan; Clouthier, Shawn G.; Wicha, Max S. (2015). "Regulation of Breast Cancer Stem Cells by Mesenchymal Stem Cells in the Metastatic Niche". Principles of Stem Cell Biology and Cancer. pp. 123–143. doi:10.1002/9781118670613.ch7. ISBN 978-1-118-67061-3.
- Pathania, Anup S.; Makhdoomi, Ubaid S.; Malik, Fayaz A. (2017). "Genetic and Epigenetic Regulation of Autophagy in Cancer". Genome Analysis and Human Health. pp. 1–29. doi:10.1007/978-981-10-4298-0_1. ISBN 978-981-10-4297-3.
- Korkaya, Hasan; Malik, Fayaz (2013). "Breast Cancer Stem Cells: Responsible for Therapeutic Resistance and Relapse?". Breast Cancer Metastasis and Drug Resistance. pp. 385–398. doi:10.1007/978-1-4614-5647-6_21. ISBN 978-1-4614-5646-9.
- Jaswant, Singh; Malik, Fayaz; Qazi, G. N. (2008). "Protective role of tea against cancer and infectious diseases through immune activation". In Jain, N. K.; Weisburger, John; Maqsood, Siddiqi (eds.). Economic crisis in tea industry: strategies for scientific management. Houston: Studium Press LLC. ISBN 978-1-933699-37-0.

== See also ==
- Breast cancer
- Monarda citriodora
