= Pawan Gupta (disambiguation) =

Pawan Gupta is an Indian biotechnologist, immunobiologist, and cell biologist.

Pawan Gupta may also refer to:

- Pawan Gupta (wushu), Indian sanda fighter
- Pawan Gupta (Nirbhaya Case), executed for rape and murder
- Pawan Gupta, British politician; see 2006 Brent London Borough Council election
