= National Bioscience Award for Career Development =

Indian academic award

National Bio-science Award for Career Development
- National award for contributions to science
- Sponsored by: Department of Biotechnology
- Rewards: Citation Plaque; ₹200,000 Research grant of ₹1500,000 (Note: Research grant is paid in three equal yearly installments)
- First award: 1999
- Final award: 2015

The National Bio-science Award for Career Development or N-BIOS Prize is an Indian science award for recognizing excellence and promoting research in bio-sciences disciplines. It was instituted in 1999 by the Department of Biotechnology of the Government of India and is for encouraging Indian bio-scientists of less than 45 years of age. The award is given annually for unique contributions made towards the development of state of art in basic and applied areas of biological sciences through demonstrated activity in the form of publication in reputed journals and or patents. The award recognizes research and development work carried out in India during the last 5 years of the career. The award carries a citation, a plaque, a cash prize of ₹200,000 and a research support grant of ₹1,500,000, distributed annually in equal installments for three years. The award is one of the highest Indian biology awards, next to the Shanti Swarup Bhatnagar Prize given by the Council of Scientific and Industrial Research of India.

== N-BIOS Award recipients ==
List of awardees (Note: Not awarded in 2016, awards for 2017 and 2018 declared together)

=== Recipients (1999–2009) ===
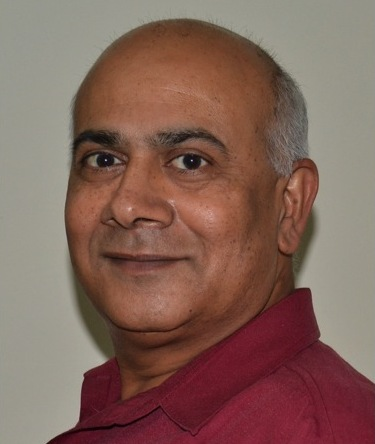
Dinakar Mashnu Salunke

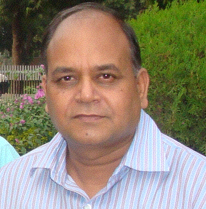
Gajendra Pal Singh Raghava

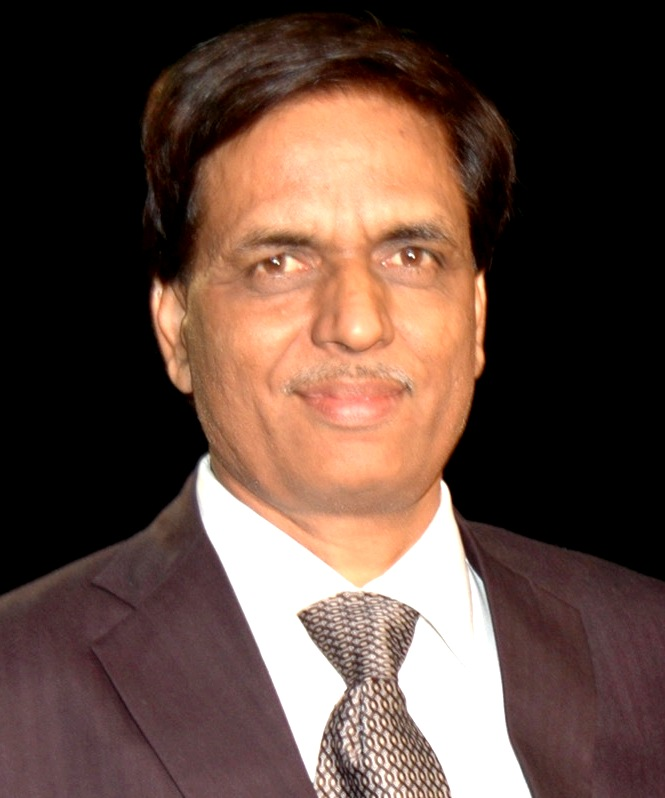
Nagendra Kumar Singh

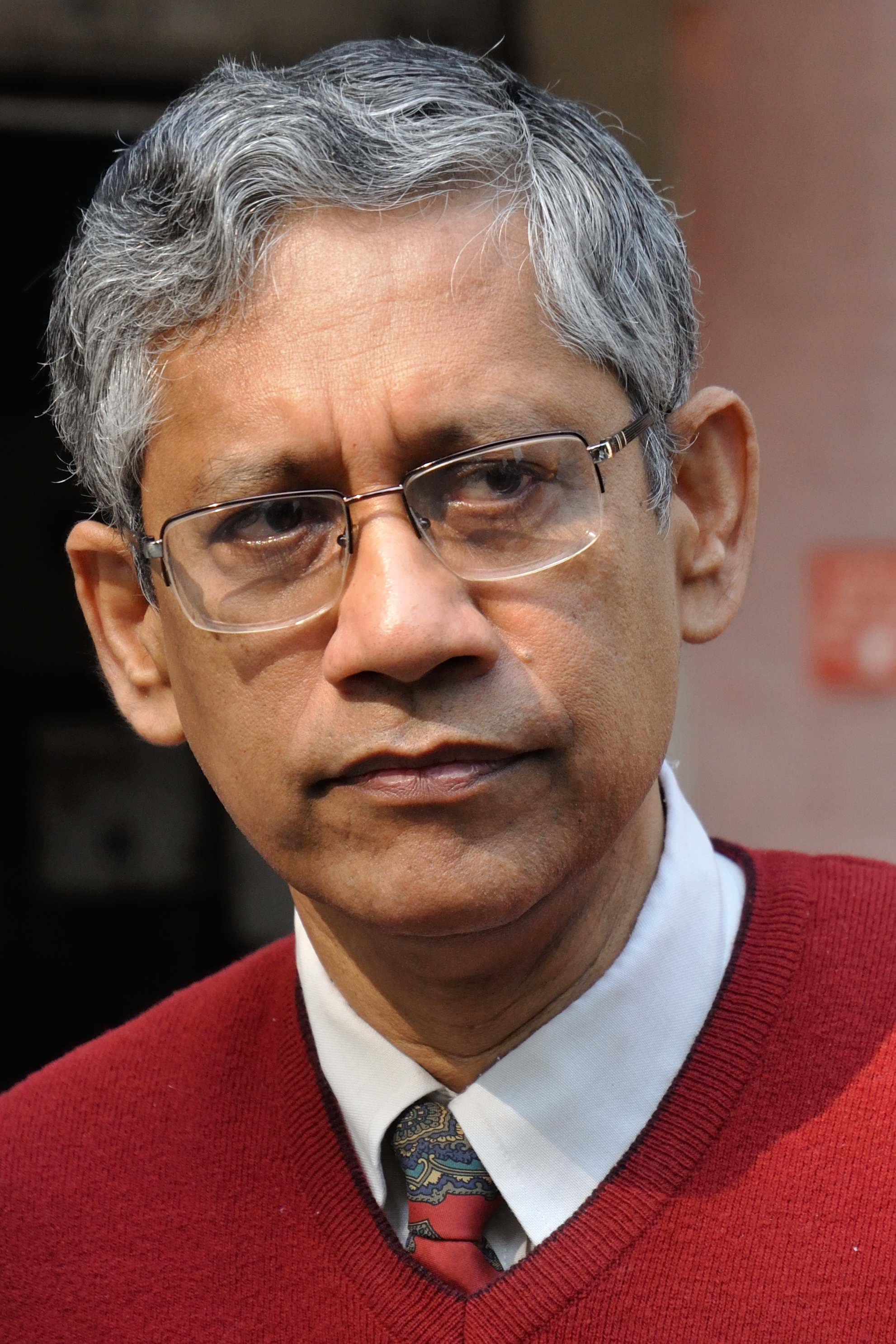
Santanu Bhattacharya

Year	Recipient	Institution
1999	Umesh Varshney	Indian Institute of Science
1999	Kanury Venkata Subba Rao	International Centre for Genetic Engineering and Biotechnology
1999	Dinakar Mashnu Salunke	National Institute of Immunology
1999	Birendra Nath Mallick	Jawaharlal Nehru University
1999	Akhilesh Kumar Tyagi	University of Delhi
2000	P. Pardha Saradhi	Jamia Millia Islamia
2000	P. Ananda Kumar	Indian Agricultural Research Institute
2000	K. P. Mohanakumar	Indian Institute of Chemical Biology
2000	Madhu Dikshit	Central Drug Research Institute
2000	Anand Kumar Bachhawat	Institute of Microbial Technology
2000	Amitabha Mukhopadhyay	National Institute of Immunology
2001	Nagendra Kumar Singh	Indian Agricultural Research Institute
2001	Ram Rajasekharan	Central Food Technological Research Institute
2001	P. N. Rangarajan	Indian Institute of Science
2001	Pradip K. Chakraborti	Institute of Microbial Technology
2001	Akhil Chandra Banerjea	National Institute of Immunology
2001	Vinod Bhakuni	Central Drug Research Institute
2002	M. Radhakrishna Pillai (scientist)	Regional Cancer Centre, Thiruvananthapuram
2002	Mohammad Islam Khan	National Chemical Laboratory
2002	Rakesh Kumar Jain	Institute of Microbial Technology
2002	Anil Grover	University of Delhi
2002	Santanu Bhattacharya	Indian Institute of Science
2002	Joyoti Basu	Bose Institute
2002	Rakesh Aggarwal	Sanjay Gandhi Postgraduate Institute of Medical Sciences
2003	Usha Vijayaraghavan	Indian Institute of Science
2003	Trilochan Mohapatra	Indian Agricultural Research Institute
2003	Sudhanshu Vrati	National Institute of Immunology
2003	Soniya Nityanand	Sanjay Gandhi Postgraduate Institute of Medical Sciences
2003	Ramesh Venkata Sonti	Centre for Cellular and Molecular Biology
2003	Gopal Chandra Kundu	National Centre for Cell Science
2003	Chinmoy Sankar Dey	National Institute of Pharmaceutical Education and Research
2004	Jyoti Prakash Tamang	Sikkim Government College, Gangtok
2004	Banwari Lal	The Energy and Resources Institute
2004	K. Sekar	Indian Institute of Science
2004	Narayanaswamy Srinivasan	Indian Institute of Science
2004	Tapas Kumar Kundu	Jawaharlal Nehru Centre for Advanced Scientific Research
2004	Amita Aggarwal	Sanjay Gandhi Postgraduate Institute of Medical Sciences
2004	Geeta Kashyap Vemuganti	L. V. Prasad Eye Institute
2005	Rajendra Prasad Roy	National Institute of Immunology
2005	Sudip Chattopadhyay	National Institute of Plant Genome Research
2005	Gajendra Pal Singh Raghava	Institute of Microbial Technology
2005	Apurva Sarin	Tata Institute of Fundamental Research
2005	Dulal Panda	Indian Institute of Technology, Mumbai
2005	Saumitra Das	Indian Institute of Science
2006	G. Pradeep Kumar	Rajiv Gandhi Centre for Biotechnology
2006	Ajay Kumar Parida	MS Swaminathan Research Foundation
2006	Pramod P. Wangikar	Indian Institute of Technology, Mumbai
2006	G. Taru Sharma	Indian Veterinary Research Institute
2006	Javed N. Agrewala	Institute of Microbial Technology
2006	Kumaravel Somasundaram	Indian Institute of Science
2006	Sanjeev Galande	National Centre for Cell Science
2007	T. R. Sharma	Indian Agricultural Research Institute
2007	Snehasikta Swarnakar	Indian Institute of Chemical Biology
2007	Srinivasan Ramachandran	Institute of Genomics and Integrative Biology
2007	R. Sowdhamini	National Centre for Biological Sciences
2007	Ranjan Sen	Centre for DNA Fingerprinting and Diagnostics
2007	Owais Mohammad	Aligarh Muslim University
2007	G. Dhinakar Raj	Madras Veterinary College
2007	Bhaskar Saha	National Centre for Cell Science
2007	Amit Prakash Sharma	International Centre for Genetic Engineering and Biotechnology
2008	Rajan Sankaranarayanan	Centre for Cellular and Molecular Biology
2008	Utpal Shashikant Tatu	Indian Institute of Science
2008	Nihar Ranjan Jana	National Brain Research Centre
2008	R. Sankararamakrishnan	Indian Institute of Technology, Kanpur
2008	Anuranjan Anand	Jawaharlal Nehru Centre for Advanced Scientific Research
2008	Samit Kumar Nandi	West Bengal University of Animal and Fishery Sciences
2008	S. Ganesh	Indian Institute of Technology, Kanpur
2008	Nagasuma Chandra	Indian Institute of Science
2008	Sangita Mukhopadhyay	Centre for DNA Fingerprinting and Diagnostics.
2008	Pushkar Sharma	National Institute of Immunology
2009	Rajesh Sudhir Gokhale	Institute of Genomics and Integrative Biology
2009	Mohan R. Wani	National Centre for Cell Science
2009	Garikapati Narahari Sastry	Indian Institute of Chemical Technology
2009	Ashok M. Raichur	Indian Institute of Science
2009	Balaji Prakash	Indian Institute of Technology, Kanpur
2009	K. Narayanaswamy Balaji	Indian Institute of Science
2009	Debasisa Mohanty	National Institute of Immunology
2009	Sunil Kumar Manna	Centre for DNA Fingerprinting and Diagnostics
2009	C. Kesavadas	Sree Chitra Tirunal Institute for Medical Sciences and Technology

=== Recipients (2009–2019) ===
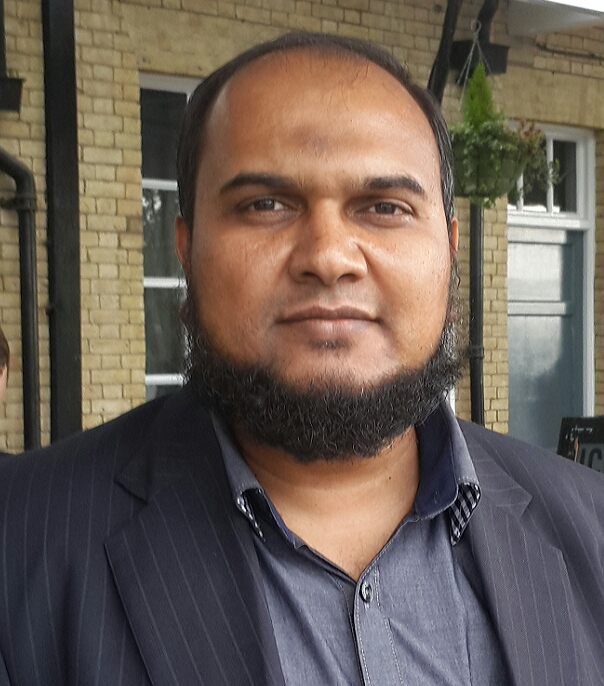
Niyaz Ahmed

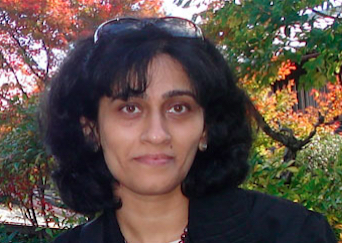
Vidita Vaidya

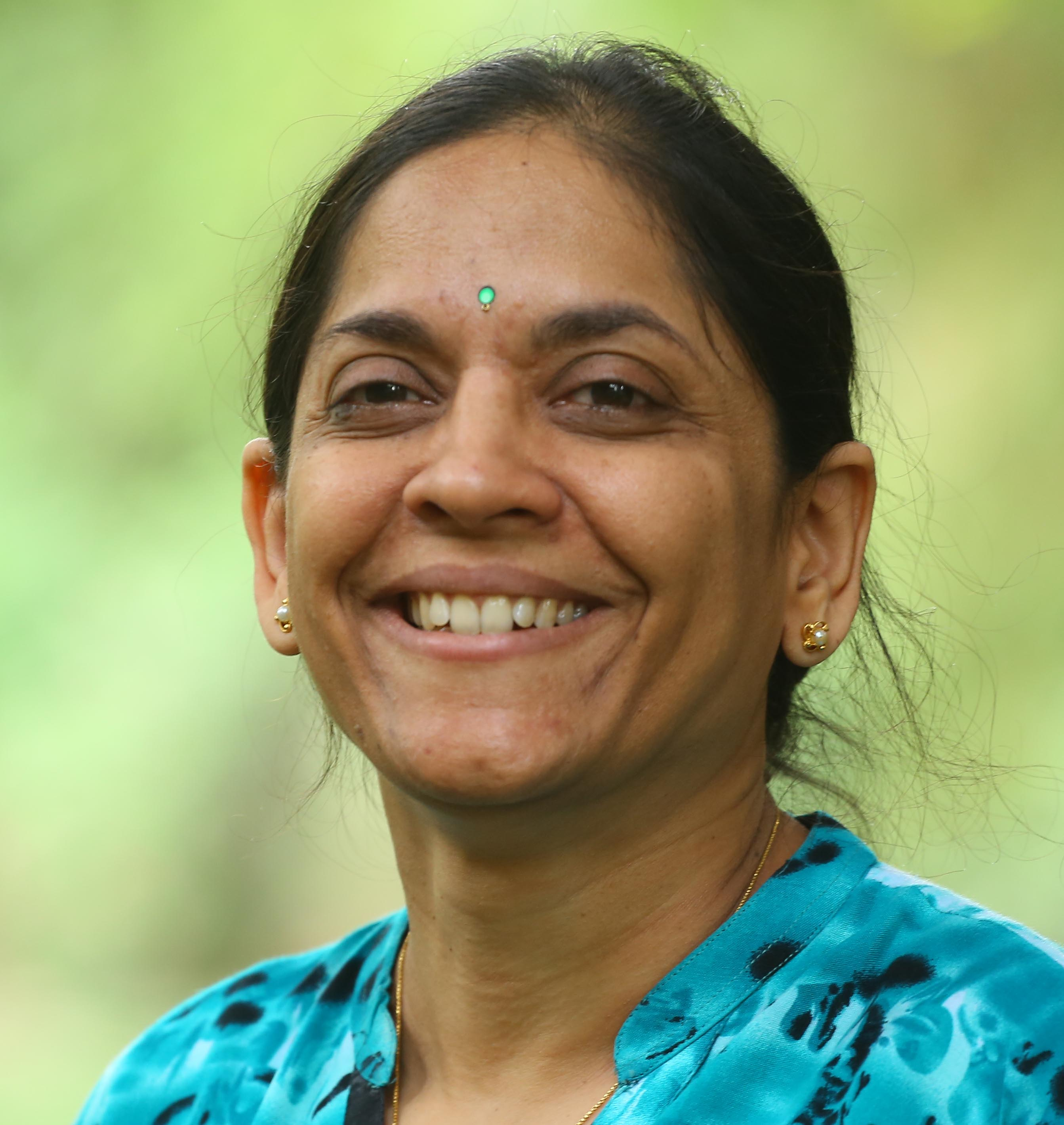
Maneesha S. Inamdar

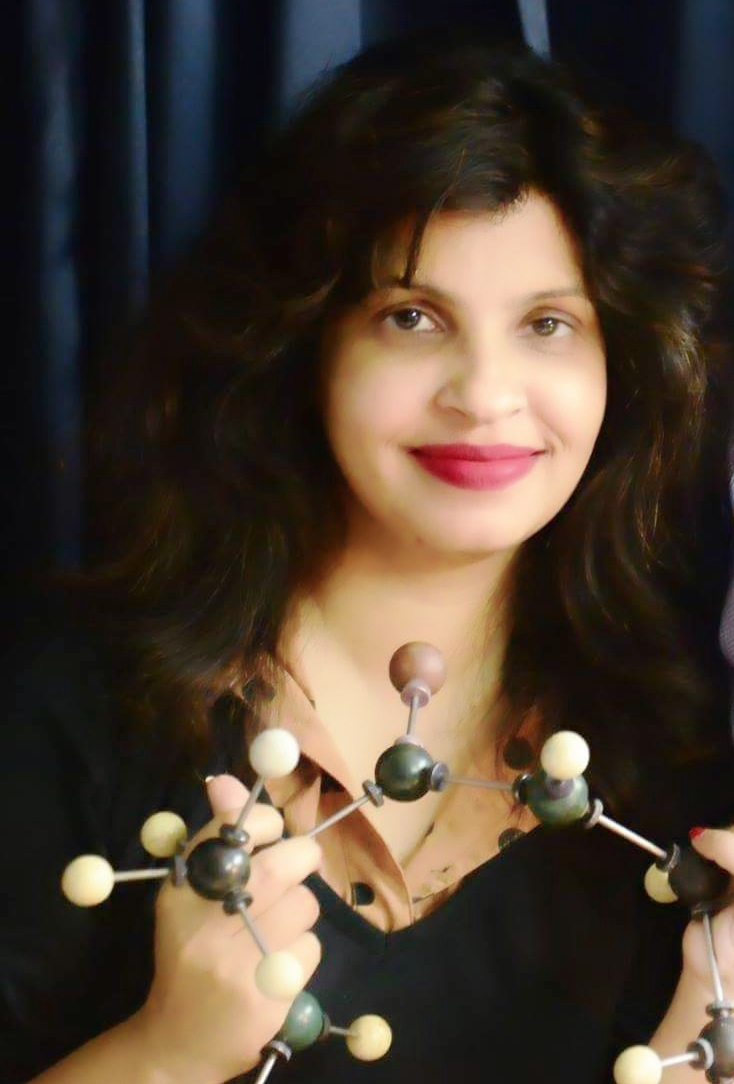
Sujata Sharma

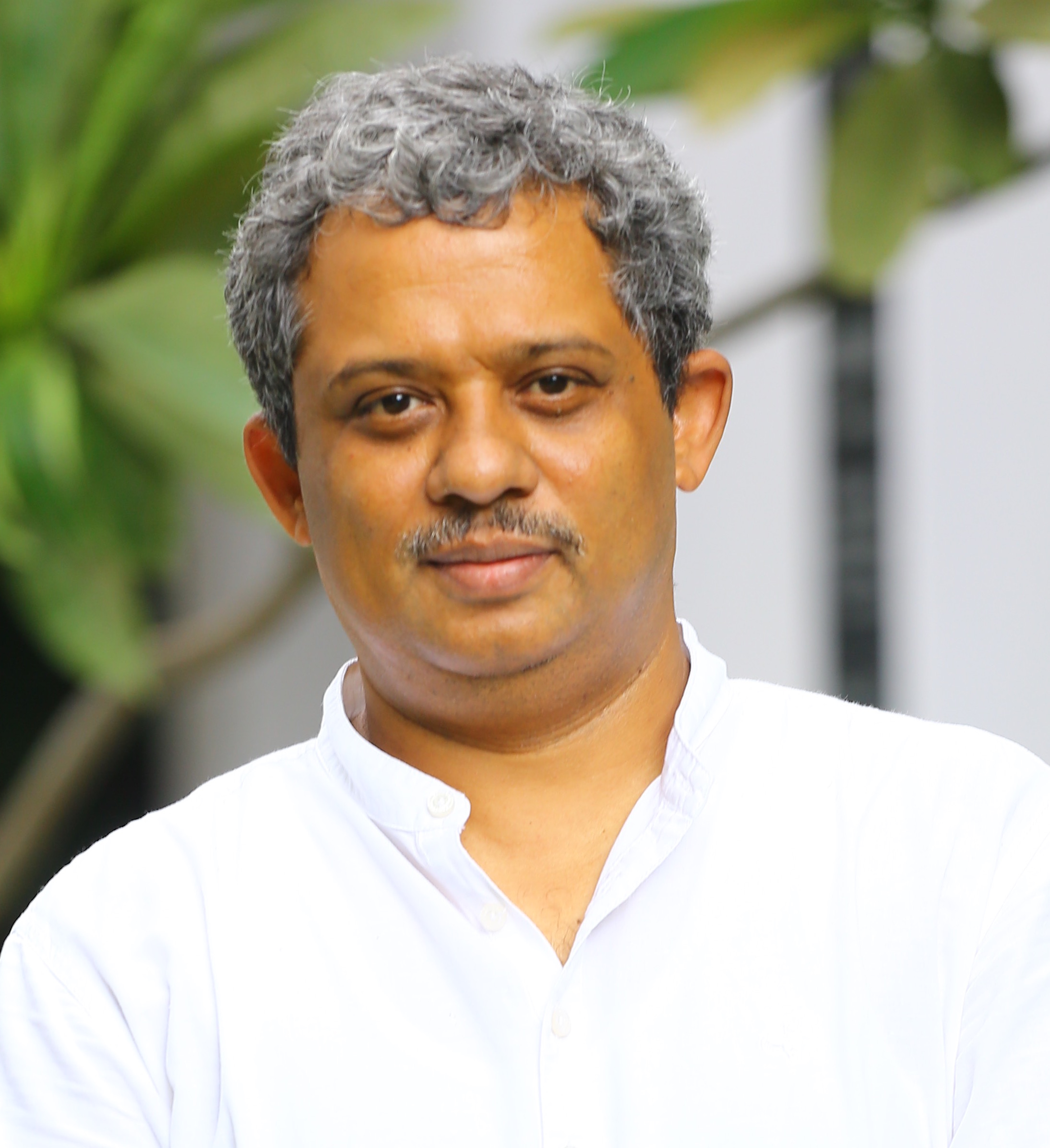
Kaustuv Sanyal

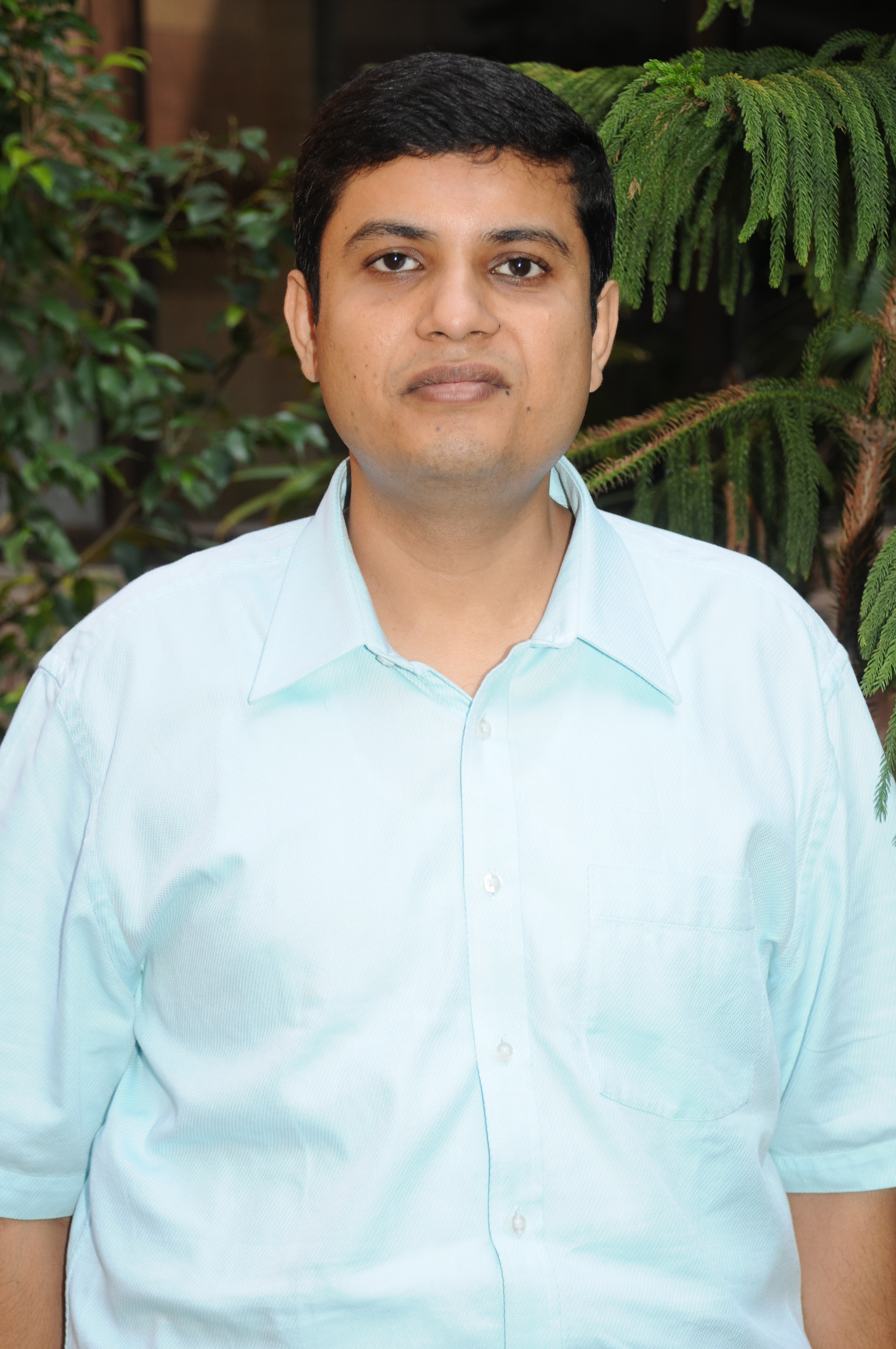
Sanjeev Das

Year	Recipient	Institution
2010	Shantanu Chowdhury	Institute of Genomics and Integrative Biology
2010	Balasubramanian Gopal	Indian Institute of Science
2010	R. Ashalatha	Sree Chitra Tirunal Institute for Medical Sciences and Technology
2010	Vinay K. Nandicoori	National Institute of Immunology
2010	Suman Kumar Dhar	Jawaharlal Nehru University
2010	Ravishankar Ramachandran	Central Drug Research Institute
2010	P. Karthe	University of Madras
2010	Dipshikha Chakravortty	Indian Institute of Science
2010	Debasis Chattopadhyay	National Institute of Plant Genome Research
2010	Anirban Basu	National Brain Research Center
2011	Sagar Sengupta	National Institute of Immunology
2011	Niyaz Ahmed	University of Hyderabad
2011	Santasabuj Das	National Institute of Cholera and Enteric Diseases
2011	Ashish Arora	Central Drug Research Institute
2011	Maneesha S. Inamdar	Jawaharlal Nehru Centre for Advanced Scientific Research
2011	Asif Mohmmed	International Centre for Genetic Engineering and Biotechnology
2011	Shantanu Sengupta	Institute of Genomics and Integrative Biology
2011	Sujata Sharma	All India Institute of Medical Sciences Delhi
2011	Dibyendu Sarkar	Institute of Microbial Technology
2011	M. M. Parida	Defence Research and Development Establishment
2012	Vidita Vaidya	Tata Institute of Fundamental Research
2012	Sathees Chukkurumbal Raghavan	Indian Institute of Science
2012	Asad Ullah Khan	Aligarh Muslim University
2012	Munia Ganguli	Institute of Genomics and Integrative Biology
2012	S. Venkata Mohan	Indian Institute of Chemical Technology
2012	Durai Sundar	Indian Institute of Technology, Delhi
2012	Subrata Adak	Indian Institute of Chemical Biology
2012	Aditya Bhushan Pant	Indian Institute of Toxicology Research
2012	Naval Kishore Vikram	All India Institute of Medical Sciences Delhi
2012	Kaustuv Sanyal	Jawaharlal Nehru Centre for Advanced Scientific Research
2013	Govindan Rajamohan	Institute of Microbial Technology
2013	A. K. Mukherjee	Tezpur University
2013	Alok Krishna Sinha	National Botanical Research Institute
2014	Manoj Prasad	National Institute of Plant Genome Research
2014	Bikramjit Basu	Indian Institute of Science
2014	Debasis Dash	Institute of Genomics and Integrative Biology
2014	Ashish Suri	All Indian Institute of Medical Sciences Delhi
2014	Deepak Thankappan Nair	Regional Centre for Biotechnology
2014	Ramandeep Singh (medical scientist)	Translational Health Science and Technology Institute
2014	Fayaz A. Malik	Indian Institute of Integrative Medicine
2014	Patrick D'Silva	Indian Institute of Science
2014	Deepak Gaur	Jawaharlal Nehru University
2014	Kausik Chattopadhyay	Indian Institute of Science Education and Research
2015	Sanjeev Das	National Institute of Immunology
2015	Ganesh Nagaraju	Indian Institute of Science
2015	Suvendra Nath Bhattacharyya	Indian Institute of Chemical Biology
2015	H. V. Thulasiram	National Chemical Laboratory
2015	Pawan Gupta	Institute of Microbial Technology
2015	Souvik Maiti	Institute of Genomics and Integrative Biology
2015	Pravindra Kumar	Indian Institute of Technology, Roorkee
2015	Anurag Agrawal	Institute of Genomics and Integrative Biology
2015	Girdhar Kumar Pandey	University of Delhi
2015	Sanjib Senapati	Indian Institute of Technology, Madras
2016	Mukesh Jain	Jawaharlal Nehru University, New Delhi
2016	Samir K. Maji	Indian Institute of Technology, Mumbai
2016	Anindita Ukil	Calcutta University, Kolkata
2016	Arnab Mukhopadhyay	National Institute of Immunology, New Delhi
2016	Rohit Srivastava	Indian Institute of Technology, Bombay
2016	Pinaki Talukdar	Indian Institute of Science Education and Research, Pune
2016	Rajnish Kumar Chaturvedi	CSIR-Indian Institute of Toxicology Research, Lucknow
2016	Jackson James	Rajiv Gandhi Centre for Biotechnology, Thiruvananthapuram
2017 & 2018	Manas Kumar Santra	National Centre for Cell Science
2017 & 2018	Dipyaman Ganguly	Indian Institute of Chemical Biology
2017 & 2018	Subhadeep Chatterjee	Centre for DNA Fingerprinting and Diagnostics
2017 & 2018	Soumen Basak	National Institute of Immunology
2017 & 2018	Manoj Majee	National Institute of Plant Genome Research, New Delhi
2017 & 2018	Arun Kumar Shukla	Indian Institute of Technology, Kanpur
2017 & 2018	Amit Singh	Indian Institute of Science
2017 & 2018	Maddika Subba Reddy	Centre for DNA Fingerprinting and Diagnostics
2017 & 2018	Beena Ramakrishnan Pillai	Institute of Genomics and Integrative Biology
2017 & 2018	Ashwani Kumar	Institute of Microbial Technology
2017 & 2018	Mohammad Zahid Ashraf	Jamia Millia Islamia
2017 & 2018	Ranjith Padinhateeri	Indian Institute of Technology, Mumbai
2017 & 2018	Rayala Suresh Kumar	Indian Institute of Technology, Madras
2017 & 2018	Prabhu B. Patil	Institute of Microbial Technology
2017 & 2018	Pritam Deb	Tezpur University
2020-21	Amit Awasthi	Translational Health Science and Technology Institute
2020-21	Bushra Ateeq	Indian Institute of Technology Kanpur

== See also ==
- List of biology awards
