= Manas Kumar Santra =

Indian cell biologist

- Education: Vidyasagar University; Indian Institute of Technology, Mumbai; University of Massachusetts Medical School
- Known for: Studies on F-box protein
- Awards: 2017/18 N-BIOS Prize
- Scientific career
- Fields: Cell biology
- Workplaces: National Centre for Cell Science

Manas Kumar Santra is an Indian cell biologist, biological chemist and a scientist at the National Centre for Cell Science (NCCS). He is known for his studies on F-box proteins which is the research focus of his laboratory at NCCS where he hosts a number of researchers.

Santra graduated in chemistry from Vidyasagar University in 1996 and earned a master's degree from the same institution in 1998. He moved to the Indian Institute of Technology, Mumbai from where he secured an MTech and a PhD in 2001 and 2006 respectively before doing his post-doctoral work at the University of Massachusetts Medical School during 2006–10. On his return to India, he joined the National Centre for Cell Science, Pune in 2010 and holds the position of a Scientist D. He has published a number of articles, (Note: Please see Selected bibliography section) and ResearchGate, an online repository of scientific articles has listed 57 of them. The Department of Biotechnology of the Government of India awarded him the National Bioscience Award for Career Development, one of the highest Indian science awards, for his contributions to biosciences, in 2017–18.

== Selected bibliography ==
- Chanukuppa V, Taware R, Chatterjee T, Sharma S, More TH, Taunk K, Kumar S, Santra MK, Rapole S (November 2018). "Current understanding of the potential of proteomics and metabolomics approaches in cancer chemoresistance: A focus on Multiple Myeloma". Current Topics in Medicinal Chemistry. 19 (30): 2584–2598. doi:10.2174/1568026619666181130111202. PMID 30499398. S2CID 54165255.
- Ghosh C, Gupta N, More P, Sengupta P, Mallick A, Santra MK, Basu S (October 2016). "Engineering and In Vitro Evaluation of Acid Labile Cholesterol Tethered MG132 Nanoparticle for Targeting Ubiquitin-Proteasome System in Cancer". ChemistrySelect. 1 (16): 5099–5106. doi:10.1002/slct.201601117.
- Mistri S, Paul A, Bhunia A, Manne RK, Santra MK, Puschmann H, Manna SC (28 January 2016). "A combined experimental and theoretical investigation on the Cu(II) sensing behavior of a piperazinyl moiety based ligand, and catecholase and biological activities of its Cu(II) complex in combination with pyridine 2,5-dicarboxylate". Polyhedron. 104: 63–72. doi:10.1016/j.poly.2015.11.030.
- Bhunia A, Manna S, Mistri S, Paul A, Manne RK, Santra MK, Bertolasi V, Manna SC (6 August 2015). "Synthesis, characterization, TDDFT calculation and biological activity of tetradentate ligand based square pyramidal Cu(II) complexes". RSC Advances. 5 (83): 67727–67737. Bibcode:2015RSCAd...567727B. doi:10.1039/C5RA12324K.
- Malonia SK, Dutta P, Santra MK, Green MR (July 2015). "F-box protein FBXO31 directs degradation of MDM2 to facilitate p53-mediated growth arrest following genotoxic stress". Proceedings of the National Academy of Sciences of the United States of America. 112 (28): 8632–7. Bibcode:2015PNAS..112.8632M. doi:10.1073/pnas.1510929112. PMC 4507212. PMID 26124108.

== See also ==
- Ligand
- Proteomics
