= Vijayaraghavan (surname) =

Vijayaraghavan is an Indian surname. People with this surname include:

- Pon. Vijayaraghavan, Congress politician from Tamil Nadu
- Tirukkannapuram Vijayaraghavan (1902–1955), mathematician
- Rangachari Vijayaraghavan (born 1946), cricket umpire
- A. Vijayaraghavan
- G. Vijayaraghavan (born 1942)
- Ramanuja Vijayaraghavan (born 1931)
- Usha Vijayaraghavan (born 1961)
- Karthika Vijayaraghavan (born 1988), cricketer
