= Madhu Dikshit =

Indian pharmacologist

- Born: 21 November 1957 (age 68); India
- Known for: Studies on Thrombosis
- Awards: 1989 INSA Young Scientist Medal; 1999 INSA Professor K. P. Bhargava Memorial Medal; 2000 N-BIOS Prize
- Scientific career
- Fields: Cardiovascular biology; Pharmacology
- Institutions: Central Drug Research Institute; Carleton University

Madhu Dikshit (born 21 November 1957) is an Indian cardiovascular biologist, pharmacologist, who served as (2015–2017) director of the Central Drug Research Institute of the Council of Scientific and Industrial Research. Known for her studies on cardiovascular pathologies such as thrombosis, she is also an adjunct professor at Carleton University. Her studies have been documented by way of a number of articles (Note: Please see Selected bibliography section) and ResearchGate, an online repository of scientific articles has listed 204 of them. All the three major Indian science academies namely Indian Academy of Sciences, National Academy of Sciences, India and Indian National Science Academy have elected her as their fellow and she is also a recipient of the Young Scientists Medal (1989) as well as the Professor K. P. Bhargava Memorial Medal (1999) of the Indian National Science Academy. The Department of Biotechnology of the Government of India awarded her the National Bioscience Award for Career Development, one of the highest Indian science awards, for her contributions to biosciences in 2000.

== Selected bibliography ==
- Prakash, Prem; Khanna, Vivek; Singh, Vishal; Jyoti, Anupam; Jain, Manish; Keshari, Ravi Shankar; Barthwal, Manoj Kumar; Dikshit, Madhu (2011). "Atorvastatin protects against ischemia-reperfusion injury in fructose-induced insulin resistant rats". Cardiovascular Drugs and Therapy. 25 (4): 285–297. doi:10.1007/s10557-011-6312-x. PMID 21671014. S2CID 3061622.
- Kothari, Nikhil; Keshari, Ravi S.; Bogra, Jaishri; Kohli, Monica; Abbas, Haider; Malik, Anita; Dikshit, Madhu; Barthwal, Manoj K. (2011). "Increased myeloperoxidase enzyme activity in plasma is an indicator of inflammation and onset of sepsis". Journal of Critical Care. 26 (4): 435.e1–435.e7. doi:10.1016/j.jcrc.2010.09.001. PMID 21036525.
- Jain, Manish; Barthwal, Manoj Kumar; Haq, Wahajul; Katti, Seturam B.; Dikshit, Madhu (2012). "Synthesis and pharmacological evaluation of novel arginine analogs as potential inhibitors of acetylcholine-induced relaxation in rat thoracic aortic rings". Chemical Biology & Drug Design. 79 (4): 459–469. doi:10.1111/j.1747-0285.2011.01286.x. PMID 22145586. S2CID 22971961.

== See also ==
- Neutrophils
- Plasma protein
