= Aditya Bhushan Pant =

Indian toxicologist and neurobiologist

- Born: 5 December 1968 (age 57); Dehradun, Uttarakhand, India
- Known for: Studies on developmental toxicology, pesticides
- Awards: 2007 ICMR Shakuntala Amir Chand Prize; 2012 N-BIOS Prize
- Scientific career
- Fields: Toxicology; Neurobiology
- Institutions: Indian Institute of Toxicology Research

Aditya Bhushan Pant is an Indian toxicologist, neurobiologist and a scientist at the Indian Institute of Toxicology Research. He is known for his studies in the fields of developmental toxicology, in vitro experiments as well as pesticides and is a member of the Neurobiology Task force of the Department of Biotechnology. His studies have been documented by way of a number of articles (Note: Please see Selected bibliography section) and ResearchGate, an online repository of scientific articles has listed 121 of them. Besides, he has contributed chapters to books published by others and is an associate editor of the Annals of Neurosciences journal of the Indian Academy of Neurosciences. He is a recipient for the Shakuntala Amir Chand Prize of the Indian Council of Medical Research in 2007. The Department of Biotechnology of the Government of India awarded him the National Bioscience Award for Career Development, one of the highest Indian science awards, for his contributions to biosciences, in 2012.

== Selected bibliography ==
=== Chapters ===
- Iqbal Ahmad; Mohammad Owais; Mohammed Shahid, Farrukh Aqil (3 August 2010). Combating Fungal Infections: Problems and Remedy. Springer Science & Business Media. pp. 213–. ISBN 978-3-642-12173-9.

=== Articles ===
- Pandey, Ankita; Jauhari, Abhishek; Singh, Tanisha; Singh, Parul; Singh, Nishant; Srivastava, Ankur Kumar; Khan, Farah; Pant, Aditya Bhushan; Parmar, Devendra (19 October 2015). "Transactivation of P53 by cypermethrin induced miR-200 and apoptosis in neuronal cells". Toxicology Research. 4 (6): 1578–1586. doi:10.1039/c5tx00200a. ISSN 2045-4538.
- Srivastava, Ritesh Kumar; Rahman, Qamar; Kashyap, Mahendra Pratap; Lohani, Mohtashim; Pant, Aditya Bhushan (29 September 2011). "Ameliorative Effects of Dimetylthiourea and N-Acetylcysteine on Nanoparticles Induced Cyto-Genotoxicity in Human Lung Cancer Cells-A549". PLOS ONE. 6 (9) e25767. Bibcode:2011PLoSO...625767S. doi:10.1371/journal.pone.0025767. ISSN 1932-6203. PMC 3183081. PMID 21980536.
- Chandra, Abhijit; Srivastava, Ritesh Kumar; Kashyap, Mahendra Pratap; Kumar, Raj; Srivastava, Rajeshwar Nath; Pant, Aditya Bhushan (24 May 2011). "The Anti-Inflammatory and Antibacterial Basis of Human Omental Defense: Selective Expression of Cytokines and Antimicrobial Peptides". PLOS ONE. 6 (5) e20446. Bibcode:2011PLoSO...620446C. doi:10.1371/journal.pone.0020446. ISSN 1932-6203. PMC 3101256. PMID 21647223.

== See also ==
- Apoptosis
- Omentum
