= Prabhu B. Patil =

Indian bacterial geneticist and senior scientist

- Born: India
- Known for: Studies on Bacterial genetics, genomics and metagenomics
- Awards: 2017–18 N-BIOS Prize
- Scientific career
- Fields: Bacterial genetics
- Institutions: Institute of Microbial Technology

Prabhu B. Patil is an Indian bacterial geneticist and a senior scientist at the Institute of Microbial Technology. Known for his studies on bacterial genetics, genomics and metagenomics, Patil has published his research findings by way of a number of articles; (Note: Please see Selected bibliography section) ResearchGate, an online repository of scientific articles has listed 95 of them. The Department of Biotechnology of the Government of India awarded him the National Bioscience Award for Career Development, one of the highest Indian science awards, for his contributions to biosciences, in 2017–18.

== Selected bibliography ==
- Nandanwar, Hemraj; Raje, Manoj; Patil, Prabhu B.; Arora, Ashish; Jaswal, Pallavi; Patil, Prashant P.; Maurya, Navdezda; Srivastava, Anugya; Kaur, Manpreet (2018). "Purification, Characterization and in vitro Evaluation of Polymyxin A From Paenibacillus dendritiformis: An Underexplored Member of the Polymyxin Family". Frontiers in Microbiology. 9 2864. doi:10.3389/fmicb.2018.02864. ISSN 1664-302X. PMC 6265310. PMID 30532748.
- Patil, Prabhu B.; Sonti, Ramesh V.; Kaur, Amandeep; Kumar, Sanjeet; Midha, Samriti; Bansal, Kanika (26 October 2018). "Biofilm forming capabilities and protein secretion systems distinguish ecologically diverse lineages of Xanthomonas from rice". bioRxiv 10.1101/453373.
- Patil, Prashant P.; Kumar, Sanjeet; Midha, Samriti; Gautam, Vikas; Patil, Prabhu B. (2018). "Taxonogenomics reveal multiple novel genomospecies associated with clinical isolates of Stenotrophomonas maltophilia". Microbial Genomics. 4 (8). doi:10.1099/mgen.0.000207. PMC 6159553. PMID 30084764.
- Krishnan, Ramya; Lang, Elke; Midha, Samriti; Patil, Prabhu B.; Rameshkumar, N. (1 November 2018). "Isolation and characterization of a novel 1-aminocyclopropane-1-carboxylate (ACC) deaminase producing plant growth promoting marine Gammaproteobacteria from crops grown in brackish environments. Proposal for Pokkaliibacter plantistimulans gen. nov., sp. nov., Balneatrichaceae fam. nov. in the order Oceanospirillales and an emended description of the genus Balneatrix". Systematic and Applied Microbiology. 41 (6): 570–580. Bibcode:2018SyApM..41..570K. doi:10.1016/j.syapm.2018.08.003. ISSN 0723-2020. PMID 30139512. S2CID 52076248.
- Patil, Prabhu B.; Singhal, Lipika; Shastri, Jayanthi; Kumar, Sunil; Dash, Lona; Gautam, Vikas; Midha, Samriti; Mali, Swapna; Patil, Prashant P. (2017). "Genomics Reveals a Unique Clone of Burkholderia cenocepacia Harboring an Actively Excising Novel Genomic Island". Frontiers in Microbiology. 8: 590. doi:10.3389/fmicb.2017.00590. ISSN 1664-302X. PMC 5382208. PMID 28428775.

== See also ==
- Xanthomonas
- Gammaproteobacteria
