= Rajendra Prasad Roy =

Indian chemical biologist and biochemist

- Born: 26 January 1962 (age 64); India
- Education: Indian Institute of Science
- Known for: Studies in protein engineering
- Awards: 2005 N-BIOS Prize
- Scientific career
- Fields: Synthetic protein chemistry; Chemical biology
- Workplaces: National Institute of Immunology

Rajendra Prasad Roy (born 26 January 1962) is an Indian chemical biologist, biochemist and a dean at the Regional centre for biotechnology. Known for his studies in protein engineering, Roy has developed several chemo-enzymatic strategic processes for which he has a patent assigned to him. (Note: For details, please see Patents section) He holds a PhD from the Indian Institute of Science and is an elected fellow of all the three major Indian science academies namely Indian National Science Academy, Indian Academy of Sciences, and National Academy of Sciences, India. The Department of Biotechnology of the Government of India awarded him the National Bioscience Award for Career Development, one of the highest Indian science awards, for him contributions to biosciences in 2005. Currently he is the dean of Regional Centre for Biotechnology, Faridabad.

== Patents ==
- Roy, Rajendra Prasad; Samantaray, Sharmishtha. "US Patent for Bioconjugates as therapeutic agent and synthesis thereof". patents.justia.com. Patent # 8,148,321 issued 3 April 2012.

== See also ==
- Bioconjugate Chemistry
