= Apurva Sarin =

Indian cell biologist (born 1962)

- Born: 1 March 1962 (age 64); India
- Education: University of Delhi; Jawaharlal Nehru University; National Cancer Institute
- Known for: Studies on the mechanisms of apoptosis in metazoan cells
- Awards: 2005 N-BIOS Prize
- Scientific career
- Fields: Cell biology
- Workplaces: National Centre for Biological Sciences; inStem

Apurva Sarin (born 1 March 1962) is an Indian cell biologist and is presently Sr. Professor and Director of Institute for Stem Cell Science and Regenerative Medicine (inStem), an Autonomous Institution under Department of Biotechnology, Govt. of India. Formerly, she was a professor at the National Centre for Biological Sciences. Known for her studies on the Mechanisms of apoptosis in metazoan cells, Sarin also serves as the dean of research at the Institute for Stem Cell Biology and Regenerative Medicine (inStem) and is an elected fellow of the Indian Academy of Sciences. An alumnus of the University of Delhi, she did her doctoral studies at the Jawaharlal Nehru University and the post-doctoral work at the National Cancer Institute of the National Institutes of Health. Her studies have been documented by way of a number of articles (Note: Please see Selected bibliography section) and the online article repository of the Indian Academy of Sciences has listed 44 of them. The Department of Biotechnology of the Government of India awarded her the National Bioscience Award for Career Development, one of the highest Indian science awards, for her contributions to biosciences in 2005.

Source: Pub Peer: Duplicate Image:

Notch4 Signaling Confers Susceptibility to TRAIL-Induced Apoptosis in Breast Cancer Cells Journal of Cellular Biochemistry (2015) - 1 Comment pubmed: 25704336 doi: 10.1002/jcb.25094 issn: 0730-2312 issn: 1097-4644 Shambhavi Naik, Marion MacFarlane, Apurva Sarin

Figure 1.

The three flow cytometry panels representing T47D cells look similar to the three panels representing BT474 cells, albeit in a different order, with different gated percentages, and slight changes in the dots. Shown with boxes of the same color. Could the authors please provide the originals?

== Selected bibliography ==
- Purushothaman, Divya; Marcel, Nimi; Garg, Megha; Venkataraman, Rasika; Sarin, Apurva (1 January 2013). "Apoptotic Programs Are Determined during Lineage Commitment of CD4+ T Effectors: Selective Regulation of T Effector-Memory Apoptosis by Inducible Nitric Oxide Synthase". The Journal of Immunology. 190 (1): 97–105. doi:10.4049/jimmunol.1103694. ISSN 0022-1767. PMID 23225886.
- Perumalsamy, Lakshmi R.; Nagala, Manjula; Sarin, Apurva (13 April 2010). "Notch-activated signaling cascade interacts with mitochondrial remodeling proteins to regulate cell survival". Proceedings of the National Academy of Sciences. 107 (15): 6882–6887. Bibcode:2010PNAS..107.6882P. doi:10.1073/pnas.0910060107. ISSN 0027-8424. PMC 2872423. PMID 20339081.
- Perumalsamy, L R; Nagala, M; Banerjee, P; Sarin, A (June 2009). "A hierarchical cascade activated by non-canonical Notch signaling and the mTOR–Rictor complex regulates neglect-induced death in mammalian cells". Cell Death and Differentiation. 16 (6): 879–889. doi:10.1038/cdd.2009.20. ISSN 1476-5403. PMID 19265851. S2CID 20438761.

== See also ==
- Programmed cell death
- Autophagy
