= K. Sekar =

Indian bioinformatician

- Born: Tamil Nadu, India
- Education: University of Madras; Indian Institute of Science; Ohio State University
- Awards: 2004 N-BIOS Prize
- Scientific career
- Fields: Bioinformatics
- Workplaces: Indian Institute of Science

Kanakaraj Sekar is an Indian bioinformatician and a professor at the Department of Computational and Data Sciences of the Indian Institute of Science (IISc). Known for his studies in the field of bioinformatics, Sekar heads the Laboratory for Structural Biology and Bio-computing at IISc. The Department of Biotechnology of the Government of India awarded him the National Bioscience Award for Career Development, one of the highest Indian science awards, for his contributions to biosciences in 2004.

== Biography ==
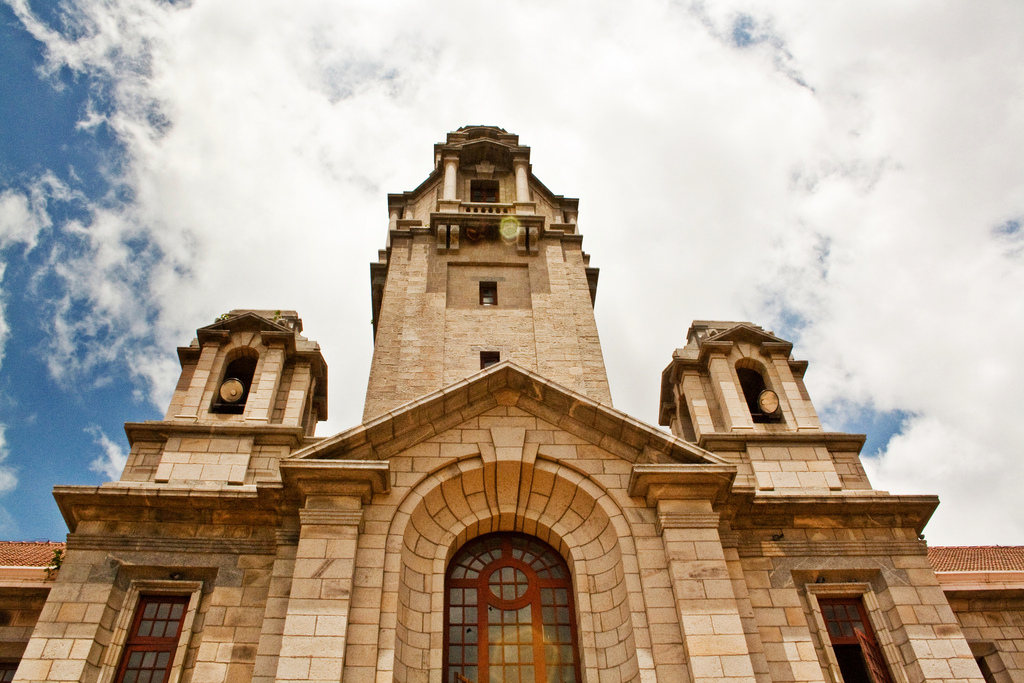
IISc Main Building

Born in the south Indian state of Tamil Nadu, Sekar did his master's degree at the University of Madras and after earning an MSc in biophysics and crystallography in 1982, he continued at the university for his doctoral studies to secure a PhD in biophysics in 1984. His post-doctoral work was on protein crystallography at two institutions, the first at the Indian Institute of Science until 1992 and later, at the Ohio State University from 1995. Returning to India in 1998, he joined the Indian Institute of Science as a senior scientific officer of structural biology and bio-computing at its Bioinformatics Centre and has been serving the institute since then. During this period, he has held various positions including those of a principal research scientist (2004–10) and an associate professor of computational and data sciences (CDS) department. He holds the position of a professor of CDS department since 2016 and heads the Laboratory for Structural Biology and Bio-computing.

Sekar's research in bioinformatics covered the fields of protein crystallography, crystallographic and internet computing as well as the development of value added knowledge bases and algorithms. His studies have been documented by way of a number of articles (Note: Please see Selected bibliography section) and Google Scholar, an online repository of scientific articles has listed 211 of them. He has delivered keynote or plenary speeches at international seminars and conferences and has mentored many doctoral and post-doctoral scholars. He is also a member of the International Union of Crystallography (IUCr).

Sekar has held the junior research fellowships of the Council of Scientific and Industrial Research (1984–88) as well as the University Grants Commission of India (1988–89) and the senior research fellowship of the CSIR (1989–92). The Department of Biotechnology of the Government of India awarded him the National Bioscience Award for Career Development, one of the highest Indian science awards in 2004.

== Selected bibliography ==
- Sankaranarayanan, Rajan; Sekar, Kanakaraj; Banerjee, Rahul; Sharma, Vivek; Surolia, Avadhesha; Vijayan, Mamannamana (1996). "A novel mode of carbohydrate recognition in jacalin, a Moraceae plant lectin with a β-prism fold". Nature Structural Biology. 3 (7): 596–603. doi:10.1038/nsb0796-596. ISSN 1545-9985. PMID 8673603. S2CID 23593928.
- Jeyaprakash, A.Arockia; Rani, P. Geetha; Reddy, G. Banuprakash; Banumathi, S.; Betzel, C.; Sekar, K.; Surolia, A.; Vijayan, M. (2002). "Crystal Structure of the Jacalin–T-antigen Complex and a Comparative Study of Lectin–T-antigen Complexes". Journal of Molecular Biology. 321 (4): 637–645. doi:10.1016/s0022-2836(02)00674-5. PMID 12206779.
- Natesh, R; Bhanumoorthy, P; Vithayathil, P.J; Sekar, K; Ramakumar, S; Viswamitra, M.A (1999). "Crystal structure at 1.8 Å resolution and proposed amino acid sequence of a thermostable xylanase from Thermoascus aurantiacus". Journal of Molecular Biology. 288 (5): 999–1012. doi:10.1006/jmbi.1999.2727. PMID 10329194.

== See also ==
- X-ray crystallography
- Crystallographic database
