= Pradip K. Chakraborti =

Indian biochemist

- Born: November 7, 1956 (age 69); West Bengal, India
- Education: Vishwa Bharati University
- Known for: Studies on Prokaryotic signal transduction
- Awards: 2001 N-BIOS Prize
- Scientific career
- Fields: Molecular biology; Biochemistry
- Workplaces: Institute of Microbial Technology

Pradip Kumar Chakraborti (born November 7, 1956) is an Indian molecular biologist, biochemist was the Chief scientist at Institute of Microbial Technology (IMTECH), a constituent institution of the Council of Scientific and Industrial Research and presently a Professor in the Department of Biotechnology at School of Chemical and Life Sciences in Jamia Hamdard, New Delhi. Known for his studies on Prokaryotic signal transduction, Chakraborti is an elected fellow of all three Science Academies in India the National Academy of Sciences, India, Indian Academy of Sciences and the Indian National Science Academy. His studies have been documented by way of a number of articles (Note: Please see Selected bibliography section) and ResearchGate, an online repository of scientific articles, has listed 98 of them. Besides, he has also contributed chapters to books edited by others. The Department of Biotechnology of the Government of India awarded him the National Bioscience Award for Career Development, one of the highest Indian science awards, for his contributions to biosciences in 2001.

== Selected bibliography ==
=== Chapters ===
- T.P. Mommsen, Peter W. Hochachka (Eds); Melvin Weisbart, Pradip K. Chakraborti, Anuradha Chakraborti, Frances M. Huntley, Aspi Maneckjee, Jennifer M. McLeese (chapter authors) (2 December 2012). "Steroid receptors in fish: membrane and intracellular preparations". Analytical Techniques. Newnes. pp. 457–. ISBN 978-0-08-093322-1.

=== Articles ===
- Payal Mittal, Subramanian Karthikeyan, Pradip K. Chakraborti (2011). "Amino Acids Involved in Polyphosphate Synthesis and Its Mobilization Are Distinct in Polyphosphate Kinase-1 from Mycobacterium tuberculosis". PLOS ONE. 6 (11) e27398. Bibcode:2011PLoSO...627398M. doi:10.1371/journal.pone.0027398. PMC 3215733. PMID 22110640.
- Ghanshyam S Yadav, Sandeep K Ravala, Sangita Kachhap, Meghna Thakur, Abhishek Roy, Balvinder Singh, Subramanian Karthikeyan, Pradip K. Chakraborti (2017). "Eukaryotic-type Serine/Threonine kinase mediated phosphorylation at Threonine-169 perturbs mycobacterial guanylate kinase activity". Bioscience Reports. 37 (6) BSR20171048. doi:10.1042/BSR20171048. PMC 5686395. PMID 28963370.
- Neha Malhotra, Subramanian Karthikeyan, Pradip K Chakraborti (2017). "Phosphorylation of mycobacterial phosphodiesterase by eukaryotic-type Ser/Thr kinase controls its two distinct and mutually exclusive functionalities". Journal of Biological Chemistry. 292 (42): 17362–17374. doi:10.1074/jbc.M117.784124. PMC 5655513. PMID 28855253.

== See also ==
- Polyphosphate Synthesis
- Phosphorylation
