= Rakesh Kumar Jain =

Indian virologist

- Born: 24 December 1957 (age 68); India
- Known for: Studies on microbes
- Awards: 2002 N-BIOS Prize
- Scientific career
- Fields: Virology
- Institutions: Microbial Type Culture Collection and Gene Bank; Institute of Microbial Technology

Rakesh Kumar Jain (born 24 December 1957) is an Indian virologist and the former head and coordinator of the Microbial Type Culture Collection (MTCC), a national research centre located at the Institute of Microbial Technology campus. He is known for his research in virology. His studies have been documented by way of a number of articles (Note: Please see Selected bibliography section) and the online article repository of John Wiley & Sons has listed several of them. Besides, he has edited one book, A Century of Plant Virology in India, an 805-page volume compiling the research done in the field of plant virology in India during the last 100 years. The Department of Biotechnology of the Government of India awarded him the National Bioscience Award for Career Development, one of the highest Indian science awards, for his contributions to biosciences in 2002.

== Selected bibliography ==
=== Books ===
- Bikash Mandal; Govind Pratap Rao; Virendra Kumar Baranwal, Rakesh Kumar Jain (28 November 2017). A Century of Plant Virology in India. Springer Singapore. ISBN 978-981-10-5672-7.

=== Articles ===
- Arora, Pankaj Kumar; Jain, Rakesh Kumar (6 June 2012). "Metabolism of 2-Chloro-4-Nitrophenol in a Gram Negative Bacterium, Burkholderia sp. RKJ 800". PLOS ONE. 7 (6) e38676. Bibcode:2012PLoSO...738676A. doi:10.1371/journal.pone.0038676. ISSN 1932-6203. PMC 3368897. PMID 22701692.
- Fazlurrahman; Batra, M.; Pandey, J.; Suri, C.r.; Jain, R.k. (1 December 2009). "Isolation and characterization of an atrazine-degrading Rhodococcus sp. strain MB-P1 from contaminated soil". Letters in Applied Microbiology. 49 (6): 721–729. doi:10.1111/j.1472-765x.2009.02724.x. ISSN 1472-765X. PMID 19818008. S2CID 39152136.
- Jain, R. K.; Mital, R. L. (5 October 1982). "ChemInform Abstract: Synthesis of Some New Polyhalogenated Hydroxy-phenothiazines and Their Alkyl and Acyl Derivatives". Chemischer Informationsdienst (in German). 13 (40): no. doi:10.1002/chin.198240226. ISSN 2199-2924.
