= Shantanu Sengupta =

Indian cell biologist

- Born: India
- Known for: Studies on the genetics of cardiovascular diseases
- Awards: 2011 N-BIOS Prize
- Scientific career
- Fields: Cell biology
- Workplaces: Institute of Genomics and Integrative Biology

Shantanu Sengupta is an Indian cell biologist and a professor at the Institute of Genomics and Integrative Biology (IGIB) of the Council of Scientific and Industrial Research. At IGIB, he coordinates the activities of the National Facility for Biochemical and Genomic Resources (NFBGR) and the Proteomics and Structural Biology Unit of the institute. He is a member of the executive council of the Proteomic Society, India and is known for his studies of cardiovascular diseases from a genetic perspective as well as of Homocysteine with regard to its toxicity and its role in epigenetic modifications. His studies have been documented by way of a number of articles (Note: Please see Selected bibliography section) and ResearchGate, an online repository of scientific articles has listed 149 of them. The Department of Biotechnology of the Government of India awarded him the National Bioscience Award for Career Development, one of the highest Indian science awards, for his contributions to biosciences, in 2011.

== Selected bibliography ==
- Ghose, Subhoshree; Bhaskar, AkashKumar; Sharma, Anju; Sengupta, Shantanu (1 September 2016). "Mendelian randomization: A biologist's perspective". Journal of the Practice of Cardiovascular Sciences. 2 (3): 151. doi:10.4103/jpcs.jpcs_62_16.
- Sengupta, Shantanu; Ghose, Subhoshree; Sharma, Anju; Agarwal, Aishwarya (1 September 2015). "Human-induced pluripotent stem cells in modeling inherited cardiomyopathies". Journal of the Practice of Cardiovascular Sciences. 1 (3): 241. doi:10.4103/2395-5414.177232.
- Sengupta, Shantanu; Varshney, Swati; Bhardwaj, Nitin; Basak, Trayambak (1 January 2015). "Identification of differentially expressed proteins in vitamin B12". Journal of the Practice of Cardiovascular Sciences. 1 (1): 45. doi:10.4103/2395-5414.157568.

== See also ==
- Mendelian randomization
- Hyperhomocysteinemia
