= Geeta Kashyap Vemuganti =

Indian ocular pathologist

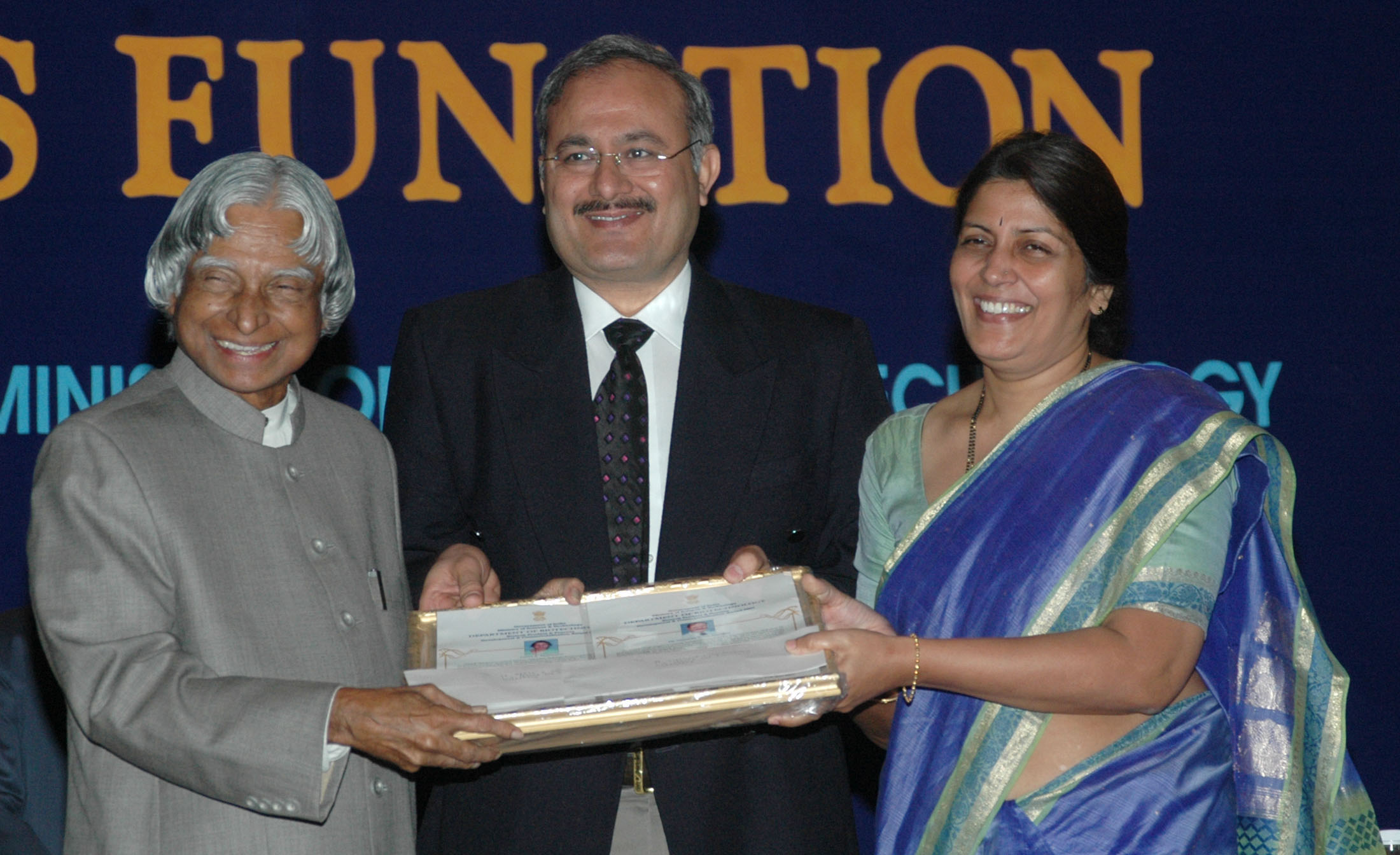
- Geeta Kashyap along with V. S. Sangwan receiving the National Award from Abdul Kalam.
- Born: 1 July 1960 (age 66); Telangana, India
- Known for: Studies in stem cell therapy
- Awards: 2004 N-BIOS Prize; 2005 Chem Tech Foundation Award
- Scientific career
- Fields: Ophthalmology
- Workplaces: L. V. Prasad Eye Institute

Geeta Kashyap Vemuganti (born 1 July 1960) is an Indian ocular pathologist and the head of the department at the Ophthalmic Pathology Service and Stem Cell Laboratory of the L. V. Prasad Eye Institute (LVPEI). She is also a dean and professor at the school of medical sciences of the University of Hyderabad.

Vemuganti is reported to have done pioneering work in stem cell therapy (Note: Please see Selected bibliography section) and was a member of the team led by V. S. Sangwan that developed a protocol for transplanting cultured stem cells for restoring vision in humans. She is an elected fellow of the National Academy of Medical Sciences and a recipient of the 2005 Chem Tech Foundation Award. The Department of Biotechnology of the Government of India awarded her the National Bioscience Award for Career Development, one of the highest Indian science awards, for her contributions to biosciences in 2004.

== Selected bibliography ==
- Purushotham Reddy Koppula, Lakshmi Kiran Chelluri, Naresh Polisetti, Geeta K Vemuganti (2009). "Histocompatibility testing of cultivated human bone marrow stromal cells- a promising step towards pre-clinical screening for allogenic stem cell therapy". Cellular Immunology. 259 (1): 61–5. doi:10.1016/j.cellimm.2009.05.014. PMID 19577229. S2CID 40986392.
- Sangwan, Virender S.; Vemuganti, Geeta Kashyap; Singh, Shashi; Balasubramanian, D. (1 August 2003). "Successful Reconstruction of Damaged Ocular Outer Surface in Humans Using Limbal and Conjuctival Stem Cell Culture Methods". Bioscience Reports. 23 (4): 169–174. doi:10.1023/b:bire.0000007690.43273.73. ISSN 0144-8463. PMID 14748537. S2CID 43227663.
- Mittica, Nicholas; Vemuganti, Geeta Kashyap; Duffy, Mark; Torczynski, Elise; Edward, Deepak P (2003). "Late Orbital Recurrence of a Choroidal Melanoma Following Internal Resection". Survey of Ophthalmology. 48 (2): 181–190. doi:10.1016/s0039-6257(02)00458-7. PMID 12686303.
- Vemuganti, Geeta Kashyap; Garg, Prashant; Gopinathan, Usha; Naduvilath, Thomas J; John, Rajesh K; Buddi, Rajeev; Rao, Gullapalli N (2002). "Evaluation of agent and host factors in progression of mycotic keratitis". Ophthalmology. 109 (8): 1538–1546. doi:10.1016/s0161-6420(02)01088-6. PMID 12153808.

== See also ==
- Keratitis
- Stem cell therapy
