= Ramandeep Singh (medical scientist) =

Indian molecular biologist

- Born: New Delhi, India
- Education: University of Delhi; National Institute of Allergy and Infectious Diseases
- Known for: Studies on the pathogenesis of Mycobacterium tuberculosis
- Awards: 2014 N-BIOS Prize
- Scientific career
- Fields: Molecular biology; Genetics
- Workplaces: Translational Health Science and Technology Institute

Ramandeep Singh is an Indian molecular biologist, geneticist and a professor at the Translational Health Science and Technology Institute. Known for his studies on the pathogenesis of Mycobacterium tuberculosis, he is a former research fellow of the National Institutes of Health. The Department of Biotechnology of the Government of India awarded him the National Bioscience Award for Career Development, one of the highest Indian science awards, for his contributions to biosciences, in 2014.

== Biography ==
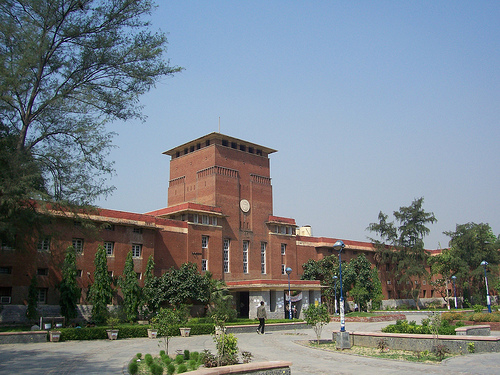
University of Delhi

Ramandeep Singh, born in New Delhi, graduated in science from the South Campus of the University of Delhi and continued his education there to earn a master's degree and later, a PhD in 2003. He did his post doctoral work on research fellowship from the National Institutes of Health at the National Institute of Allergy and Infectious Diseases. Subsequently, he joined the Translational Health Science and Technology Institute as a scientist where he serves as an associate professor at the Vaccine and Infectious Disease Research Center (VIDRC) and hosts a number of scientists at his laboratory.

== Professional profile ==
Singh's research focus is on understanding the metabolic pathways that enable Mycobacterium tuberculosis to survive in stressful conditions and he is known to have characterized genes associated with its pathogenesis such as tyrosine phosphatases. He has undertaken vaccine development projects as the principal investigator. His studies have been documented by way of a number of articles (Note: Please see Selected bibliography section) and ResearchGate, an online repository of scientific articles has listed 38 of them. He is also a member of the Biosafety Committee of the Regional Centre for Biotechnology, an autonomous organization funded by the Department of Biotechnology and the United Nations Educational, Scientific and Cultural Organization (UNESCO), as an external expert.

== Awards and honors ==
The Department of Biotechnology (DBT) of the Government of India awarded him the National Bioscience Award for Career Development, one of the highest Indian science awards in 2014.

== Selected bibliography ==
- Negi, Beena; Poonan, Prija; Ansari, Mohammad Fawad; Kumar, Deepak; Aggarwal, Sakshi; Singh, Ramandeep; Azam, Amir; Rawat, Diwan S. (2018). "Synthesis, antiamoebic activity and docking studies of metronidazole-triazole-styryl hybrids". European Journal of Medicinal Chemistry. 150: 633–641. doi:10.1016/j.ejmech.2018.03.033. PMID 29558734.
- Agarwal, Sakshi; Tiwari, Prabhakar; Deep, Amar; Kidwai, Saqib; Gupta, Shamba; Thakur, Krishan Gopal; Singh, Ramandeep (24 February 2018). "System-Wide Analysis Unravels the Differential Regulation and In Vivo Essentiality of Virulence-Associated Proteins B and C Toxin-Antitoxin Systems of Mycobacterium tuberculosis". The Journal of Infectious Diseases. 217 (11): 1809–1820. doi:10.1093/infdis/jiy109. PMID 29529224. S2CID 3865758.
- Deep, Amar; Kaundal, Soni; Agarwal, Sakshi; Singh, Ramandeep; Thakur, Krishan Gopal (29 October 2017). "Crystal structure of Mycobacterium tuberculosis VapC20 toxin and its interactions with cognate antitoxin, VapB20, suggest a model for toxin-antitoxin assembly". The FEBS Journal. 284 (23): 4066–4082. doi:10.1111/febs.14289. PMID 28986943.
