= Anuranjan Anand =

Indian human geneticist (born 1965)

- Born: 5 April 1965 (age 61); India
- Education: Indian Institute of Science, Bangalore; Stanford University
- Known for: Studies on the molecular and cellular basis of genetic disorders
- Scientific career
- Fields: Human genetics and genomics
- Institutions: Jawaharlal Nehru Centre for Advanced Scientific Research

Anuranjan Anand is a geneticist studying the cellular and molecular basis of human disorders. He is a molecular biology and genetics professor and an associate neuroscience faculty at the Jawaharlal Nehru Centre for Advanced Scientific Research.

== Biography and career ==
Anuranjan Anand did his doctoral studies at the Indian Institute of Science., and his post-doctoral studies at Stanford University. He joined Jawaharlal Nehru Centre for Advanced Scientific Research (JNCASR) as a faculty member in the Molecular Biology and Genetics Unit (MBGU) and later became a professor and chair (2009-2016) of the Unit. When the institute established the Neuroscience Unit (NSU) in 2014, he was designated as its associate faculty. He was the chair of NSU during 2016 - 2022.

== Research ==
During his post-doctoral studies, Anuranjan Anand worked with his colleagues in Bruce Baker's laboratory on the mutations of fruitless, a gene involved in sexual behavior and courtship in Drosophila melanogaster. In JNCASR, his primary focus is on human genetic diseases, emphasizing neurological disorders, hereditary hearing loss and rare developmental disorders His laboratory has discovered several genes and mutations underlying these disorders and is currently examining their biological underpinnings employing cell- and animal- modeling approaches.

== Honors ==
Anuranjan Anand received an Outstanding Research Investigator Award from the Department of Atomic Energy in 2006-2010. The Department of Biotechnology awarded him the National Bioscience Award for Career Development from 2008-2011. He is an elected fellow of the Indian Academy of Sciences, National Academy of Sciences, India, and the Indian National Science Academy.

== Selected bibliography ==
- Ratnapriya, Rinki; Satishchandra, Parthasarthy; Dilip, S.; Gadre, Girish; Anand, Anuranjan (1 November 2009). "Familial autosomal dominant reflex epilepsy triggered by hot water maps to 4q24-q28". Human Genetics. 126 (5): 677–683. doi:10.1007/s00439-009-0718-6. ISSN 0340-6717. PMID 19597845. S2CID 2063403.
- Chatterjee, Arunima; Jalvi, Rajeev; Pandey, Nishtha; Rangasayee, R.; Anand, Anuranjan (1 January 2009). "A novel locus DFNA59 for autosomal dominant nonsyndromic hearing loss maps at chromosome 11p14.2–q12.3". Human Genetics. 124 (6): 669–675. doi:10.1007/s00439-008-0596-3. ISSN 0340-6717. PMID 19030898. S2CID 1718653.
- Kapoor, Ashish; Ratnapriya, R.; Kuruttukulam, Gigy; Anand, Anuranjan (1 July 2007). "A novel genetic locus for juvenile myoclonic epilepsy at chromosome 5q12–q14". Human Genetics. 121 (6): 655–662. doi:10.1007/s00439-007-0360-0. ISSN 0340-6717. PMID 17431681. S2CID 24729173.
