= Suresh Kumar Rayala =

Indian biologist

- Born: Khammam, Andhra Pradesh, India (now Telangana, India)
- Known for: Studies on oncogenes and tumor suppressor genes
- Awards: 2015 Academy of Sciences, Chennai Young Scientist Award; 2017–18 N-BIOS Prize
- Scientific career
- Fields: Cancer biology
- Institutions: Indian Institute of Technology Madras

Suresh Kumar Rayala is an Indian cancer biologist and a professor at the department of biotechnology of the Indian Institute of Technology Madras. Known for his molecular and mechanistic studies of oncogenes and tumor suppressor genes, Rayala is a recipient of the Young Scientist Award of the Academy of Sciences, Chennai. The Department of Biotechnology of the Government of India awarded him the National Bioscience Award for Career Development, one of the highest Indian science awards, for his contributions to biosciences, in 2017–18.

== Selected bibliography ==
- Raghavan, Swetha; Venkatraman, Ganesh; Rayala, Suresh K. (10 March 2018). "Cloning and functional characterization of human Pak1 promoter by steroid hormones". Gene. 646: 120–128. doi:10.1016/j.gene.2017.12.039. ISSN 0378-1119. PMID 29274909.
- Tentu, Shilpa; Nandarapu, Kumarswamyreddy; Muthuraj, Prakash; Venkitasamy, Kesavan; Venkatraman, Ganesh; Rayala, Suresh K. (2018). "DHQZ-17, a potent inhibitor of the transcription factor HNF4A, suppresses tumorigenicity of head and neck squamous cell carcinoma in vivo". Journal of Cellular Physiology. 233 (3): 2613–2628. doi:10.1002/jcp.26139. ISSN 1097-4652. PMID 28782802. S2CID 24932321.
- Kanakaveti, Vishnupriya; Sakthivel, Ramasamy; Rayala, S. K.; Gromiha, M. Michael (2017). "Importance of functional groups in predicting the activity of small molecule inhibitors for Bcl-2 and Bcl-xL". Chemical Biology & Drug Design. 90 (2): 308–316. doi:10.1111/cbdd.12952. ISSN 1747-0285. PMID 28112863. S2CID 22426356.
- Rayala, S. K.; Venkatraman, G.; Nair, A. S.; Jeyaraman, J.; Malathi, R.; Sundaram, S.; Chidambaram, S.; Pitani, R. S.; Biswal, J. (1 August 2016). "P21-activated kinase 1 (Pak1) signaling influences therapeutic outcome in pancreatic cancer". Annals of Oncology. 27 (8): 1546–1556. doi:10.1093/annonc/mdw184. ISSN 0923-7534. PMID 27117533.
- Rayala, Suresh K.; Venkatraman, Ganesh; Kremerskothen, Joachim; Surabhi, Rohan; Beesetti, Swarnalatha; Mavuluri, Jayadev (1 May 2016). "Phosphorylation-Dependent Regulation of the DNA Damage Response of Adaptor Protein KIBRA in Cancer Cells". Molecular and Cellular Biology. 36 (9): 1354–1365. doi:10.1128/MCB.01004-15. ISSN 0270-7306. PMC 4836221. PMID 26929199.

== See also ==
- PAK1
- Hepatocyte nuclear factor 4 alpha
