= Munia Ganguli =

Indian biochemist, biotechnologist

- Born: India
- Known for: Studies in non-invasive drug delivery methods
- Awards: 2012 N-BIOS Prize; 2024 Fellow of the Indian Academy of Sciences
- Scientific career
- Fields: Biochemistry; Biotechnology
- Institutions: Institute of Genomics and Integrative Biology

Munia Ganguli is an Indian biochemist, biotechnologist and a scientist at the Institute of Genomics and Integrative Biology (IGIB). She is known for the development of non-invasive protocols of drug delivery and the team led by her was successful in developing a drug delivery system for skin disorders, using a nanometer-sized peptide complex carrying plasmid DNA which has since shown effective penetration and apparently without harming the skin. She holds two patents for the processes she has developed. At IGIB, she has established her laboratory where she hosts several research scholars and scientists. Her studies have been documented by way of a number of articles (Note: Please see Selected bibliography section) and ResearchGate, an online repository of scientific articles has listed 76 of them.

Ganguli is a member of the contingent which represented IGIB in the Joint Research Initiative between CSIR and IGIB for interfacing chemistry with biology and has been a member of the editorial advisory committee of Nano Science and its Application, a national level seminar sponsored by the University Grants Commission. She has been the leader of the IGIB project, Nanomaterials and nanodevices for applications in health and disease, has delivered invited speeches which included the International Conference on Advances in Biological Systems and Materials Science in NanoWorld (ABSMSNW-2017) and guest edited the special volume of Science and Culture journal on Emerging Trends in Genomics : Applications in Health and Disease, published in January 2011. The Department of Biotechnology of the Government of India awarded her the National Bioscience Award for Career Development, one of the highest Indian science awards, for her contributions to biosciences, in 2012.

== Selected bibliography ==
- Sharma, Rajpal; Shivpuri, Shivangi; Anand, Amitesh; Kulshreshtha, Ankur; Ganguli, Munia (1 July 2013). "Insight into the Role of Physicochemical Parameters in a Novel Series of Amphipathic Peptides for Efficient DNA Delivery". Molecular Pharmaceutics. 10 (7): 2588–2600. doi:10.1021/mp400032q. ISSN 1543-8384. PMID 23725377.
- Naik, Rangeetha J.; Chatterjee, Anindo; Ganguli, Munia (2013). "Different roles of cell surface and exogenous glycosaminoglycans in controlling gene delivery by arginine-rich peptides with varied distribution of arginines". Biochimica et Biophysica Acta (BBA) - Biomembranes. 1828 (6): 1484–1493. doi:10.1016/j.bbamem.2013.02.010. PMID 23454086.
- Ganguli, Munia; Nisakar, Daniel; Sharma, Rajpal; Vij, Manika (2015). "494. Glycosaminoglycans in Gene Delivery: An Effective Strategy for Enhancement of Transfection Efficiency of Amphipathic Peptides for Localized and Systemic Applications?". Molecular Therapy. 23: S197. doi:10.1016/s1525-0016(16)34103-x.

== See also ==
- Plasmid
- Peptide
