= Pritam Deb =

Indian physicist

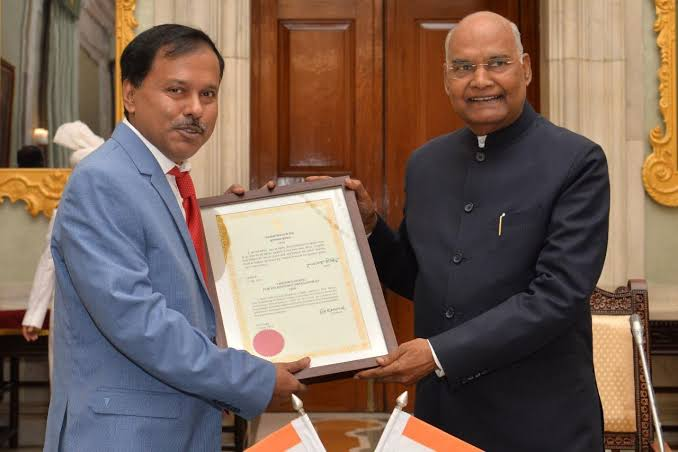
- Born: West Bengal, India
- Known for: Studies on non isothermal kinetics
- Awards: 2017–18 N-BIOS Prize
- Scientific career
- Fields: Nanoscience
- Institutions: Tezpur University

Pritam Deb is an Indian physicist, nanoscientist and a professor of physics at Tezpur University. He is known for his studies on nanoscience and technology as well as the physics of materials and has published a number of articles; (Note: Please see Selected bibliography section) ResearchGate, an online repository of scientific articles has listed 86 of them. Besides, he has also published a book, Kinetics of Heterogeneous Solid State Processes, on nonisothermal kinetics.

Deb was a part of the team that successfully campaigned for selecting Tezpur University as a nodal center for establishing the Technology Enabling Centre (TEC) of the Department of Science and Technology. The Department of Biotechnology of the Government of India awarded him the National Bioscience Award for Career Development, one of the highest Indian science awards, for his contributions to biosciences, in 2017–18.

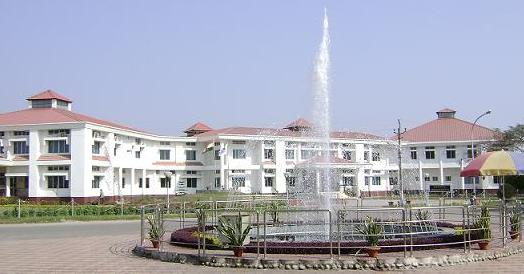
Tezpur University

== Selected bibliography ==
=== Books ===
- Pritam Deb (3 December 2013). Kinetics of Heterogeneous Solid State Processes. Springer Science & Business Media. ISBN 978-81-322-1756-5.
- P. P. Sahu and Pritam Deb (30 September 2007). Contemporary Optics and Optoelectronics. McGraw Hill.

=== Articles ===
- Deb, Pritam; Dasgupta, Suman; Choudhary, Saynaz A.; Kaushik, Som Datta; Lodha, Saurabh; Biswas, Jayeeta; Kumar, Dinesh; Guleria, Anupam; Deka, Kashmiri (2019-01-15). "Janus nanoparticles for contrast enhancement of T1–T2 dual mode magnetic resonance imaging". Dalton Transactions. 48 (3): 1075–1083. doi:10.1039/C8DT04038A. ISSN 1477-9234. PMID 30601511. S2CID 58608498.
- Saikia, K.; Bhattacharya, K.; Sen, D.; Kaushik, S. D.; Biswas, J.; Lodha, S.; Gogoi, B.; Buragohain, A. K.; Kockenberger, W. (2019-01-15). "Solvent evaporation driven entrapment of magnetic nanoparticles in mesoporous frame for designing a highly efficient MRI contrast probe". Applied Surface Science. 464: 567–576. Bibcode:2019ApSS..464..567S. doi:10.1016/j.apsusc.2018.09.117. ISSN 0169-4332. S2CID 106388539.
- Phukan, Bedika; Ghorai, Samir; Deka, Kashmiri; Deb, Pritam; Mukherjee, Chandan (2018-01-03). "Interactions of Alkali and Alkaline-Earth Metals in Water-Soluble Heterometallic FeIII/M (M = Na+, K+, Ca2+)-Type Coordination Complex". Crystal Growth & Design. 18 (1): 531–539. doi:10.1021/acs.cgd.7b01588. ISSN 1528-7483.
- Deka, Kashmiri; Nath, Namita; Saikia, Binoy K.; Deb, Pritam (2017-12-01). "Kinetic analysis of ceria nanoparticle catalysed efficient biomass pyrolysis for obtaining high-quality bio-oil". Journal of Thermal Analysis and Calorimetry. 130 (3): 1875–1883. doi:10.1007/s10973-017-6476-0. ISSN 1588-2926. S2CID 98947505.

== See also ==
- Reaction progress kinetic analysis
- Janus particles
