= Ashalatha Radhakrishnan =

Indian neurologist

R. Ashalatha
- Born: Kerala, India
- Known for: Studies on neurological disorders
- Awards: 2009 N-BIOS Prize
- Scientific career
- Fields: Neurology
- Institutions: Sree Chitra Tirunal Institute for Medical Sciences and Technology

Ashalatha Radhakrishnan is an Indian neurologist and a professor of neurology at the Sree Chitra Tirunal Institute for Medical Sciences and Technology. Her research on various neurological disorders have been documented by a number of articles. She has also contributed to several books, including Status Epilepticus: Practical Guidelines in Management, a handbook on Status epilepticus. She was the convener of workshop on epilepsy at the Monsoon Summit 2017 organized by the Kerala Association of Neurologists. The Department of Biotechnology of the Government of India awarded her the National Bioscience Award for Career Development, one of the highest Indian science awards, for her contributions to biosciences, in 2010.

== Bibliography ==
=== Books ===
- Ashalatha Radhakrishnan (30 September 2017). Status Epilepticus: Practical Guidelines in Management. JP Medical Ltd. ISBN 978-93-86322-99-9.

=== Chapters ===
- Hannes Vogel (27 April 2009). Nervous System. Cambridge University Press. pp. 383–. ISBN 978-0-521-88161-6.

=== Articles ===
- Raghavendra, S.; Ashalatha, R.; Thomas, Sanjeev V.; Kesavadas, C. (1 April 2007). "Focal neuronal loss, reversible subcortical focal T2 hypointensity in seizures with a nonketotic hyperglycemic hyperosmolar state". Neuroradiology. 49 (4): 299–305. doi:10.1007/s00234-006-0189-6. ISSN 0028-3940. PMID 17200865. S2CID 39437512.
- Firosh Khan, S.; Ashalatha, R.; Thomas, S.V.; Sarma, P.S. (2005). "Emergent EEG is helpful in neurology critical care practice". Clinical Neurophysiology. 116 (10): 2454–2459. doi:10.1016/j.clinph.2005.06.024. PMID 16122983. S2CID 27222512.
- Raghavendra, S.; Ashalatha, R.; Krishnamoorthy, T.; Kesavadas, C.; Thomas, S.V.; Radhakrishnan, K. (2007). "Reversible periictal MRI abnormalities: Clinical correlates and long-term outcome in 12 patients". Epilepsy Research. 73 (1): 129–136. doi:10.1016/j.eplepsyres.2006.10.007. PMID 17125968. S2CID 23820788.
