= G. Pradeep Kumar =

Indian cell biologist

Dr Pradeep Kumar G.
- Born: 1 August 1962 (age 64); Kerala, India
- Education: Devi Ahilya Vishwavidyalaya; Rockefeller University
- Known for: Studies on Disease biology
- Awards: 2006 N-BIOS Prize; 2015 ISSRF Labshetwar Award
- Scientific career
- Fields: Cell biology
- Workplaces: University of Kerala; Devi Ahilya Vishwavidyalaya; Rajiv Gandhi Centre for Biotechnology; University of Virginia; University of Florida

Pradeep Kumar G. is an Indian cell biologist and a scientist at the Rajiv Gandhi Centre for Biotechnology. Known for his studies in the field of disease biology, Dr Kumar is a life member of the Kerala Academy of Sciences. The Department of Biotechnology of the Government of India awarded him the National Bioscience Award for Career Development, one of the highest Indian science awards, for his contributions to biosciences in 2006. He has also been conferred with the prestigious Labhsetwar Award (2015) and the Dr. TC Anand Kumar Memorial Oration Award (2016) of the Indian Society for the Study of Reproduction and Fertility (ISSRF) and the Subhas Mukherjee Memorial Oration Award (2017) of the Academy of Clinical Embryologists.

== Biography ==
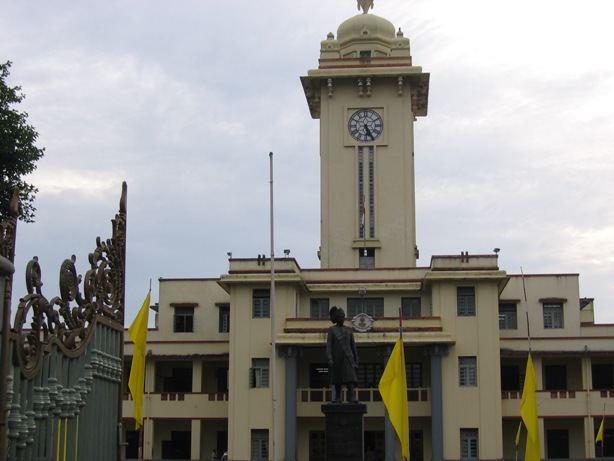
University of Kerala.

Pradeep Kumar G., born in the Alappuzha district of Kerala, did his post-graduate studies at the University of Kerala and after earning an MSc in zoology in 1984, he moved to the Devi Ahilya Vishwavidyalaya for his doctoral studies on the biophysics of sperm membranes to secure a PhD in 1988. Subsequently, he started his career by joining the same institution as a member of faculty in 1989. He served the institution holding the positions of a lecturer, senior lecturer (1994) and reader (1999) and, in between, completed his post-doctoral work at the Centre for Biomedical Research of the Rockefeller University and University of Virginia. In 2004, he returned to his home state of Kerala to set up his laboratory at the Division of Molecular Reproduction of the Rajiv Gandhi Centre for Biotechnology (RGCB) where he is a senior faculty, holding the position of a Scientist Grade G. he is also a visiting faculty at the University of Virginia and the University of Florida.

Kumar's research at RGCB is focused on molecular reproduction and he heads a group of scientists working on reproductive genomics and proteomics. He is reported to have done advanced research on the development and differentiation of germ cells in mammalian testis and his work has widened the understanding of Primordial Germ Cells (PGCs) and their differentiation. His studies have been documented by way of a number of articles (Note: Please see Selected bibliography section) and ResearchGate, an online repository of scientific articles has listed 128 of them. Besides, he has contributed chapters to books published by others. He holds a US and international patent on Activators of Cyclin-Dependent Kinases (ACDK) and has mentored many doctoral scholars in their studies.

Kumar is a member of the executive committee of the Indian Society for the Study of Reproduction and Fertility (ISSRF) and a life member of the Kerala Academy of Sciences. The Department of Biotechnology of the Government of India awarded him the National Bioscience Award for Career Development, one of the highest Indian science awards in 2006. He is also a recipient of the 2015 Labshetwar Award of the Indian Society for the Study of Reproduction and Fertility.

== Personal life ==
Kumar currently resides in Thiruvananthapuram along with his wife Dr Malini Laloraya, a fellow scientist herself.

== Selected bibliography ==
- Radhakrishnan, Karthika; Bhagya, Kongattu P.; Kumar, Anil TR; Devi, Anandavalli N.; Sengottaiyan, Jeeva; Kumar, Pradeep G. (1 August 2016). "Autoimmune Regulator (AIRE) Is Expressed in Spermatogenic Cells, and It Altered the Expression of Several Nucleic-Acid-Binding and Cytoskeletal Proteins in Germ Cell 1 Spermatogonial (GC1-spg) Cells". Molecular & Cellular Proteomics. 15 (8): 2686–2698. doi:10.1074/mcp.m115.052951. ISSN 1535-9476. PMC 4974344. PMID 27281783.
- Chandran, Uma; Indu, Sivankutty; Kumar, Anil T. R.; Devi, A. N.; Khan, Irfan; Srivastava, Diwas; Kumar, Pradeep G. (1 July 2016). "Expression of Cnnm1 and Its Association with Stemness, Cell Cycle, and Differentiation in Spermatogenic Cells in Mouse Testis". Biology of Reproduction. 95 (1): 7. doi:10.1095/biolreprod.115.130369. ISSN 0006-3363. PMID 27251091.
- Anilkumar, Thottathil R.; Devi, Anandavalli N.; Pillai, Sathy M.; Jayakrishnan, Krishnapillai; Oommen, Oommen V.; Kumar, Pradeep G. (24 October 2017). "Expression of protocadherin 11Yb (PCDH11Yb) in seminal germ cells is correlated with fertility status in men". Reproduction, Fertility and Development. 29 (11): 2100–2111. doi:10.1071/rd16478. ISSN 1448-5990. PMID 28241900.

== See also ==
- Cellular differentiation
- Meiosis
