= Utpal S. Tatu =

Indian biochemist

- Education: Indian Institute of Science
- Known for: Studies on malaria and other neglected infectious diseases of global relevance.
- Awards: 2008 N-BIOS Prize Ranbaxy Research Award Birla Science Award
- Scientific career
- Fields: Molecular biology
- Workplaces: Indian Institute of Science

Utpal Shashikant Tatu is an Indian molecular biologist, biochemist, a Professor and Chairman of the Department of Biochemistry at the Indian Institute of Science. He is known for his research on infectious diseases including Malaria, Bebesiosis, Giardiasis, Trypanosomosis, Trichomonosis, Rabies and other neglected tropical diseases of global relevance. He is one of the first proponents of "One Health" concept to control infectious disease outbreaks. The 'One Health' approach advocates designing and implementing strategies, policies and carrying out scientific research which involves collaboration between multiple sectors that will lead to major public health outcomes. Tatu is an elected fellow of the Indian Academy of Sciences. The Department of Biotechnology of the Government of India awarded him the National Bioscience Award for Career Development, one of the highest Indian science awards, for his contributions to biosciences in 2008.

== Biography ==
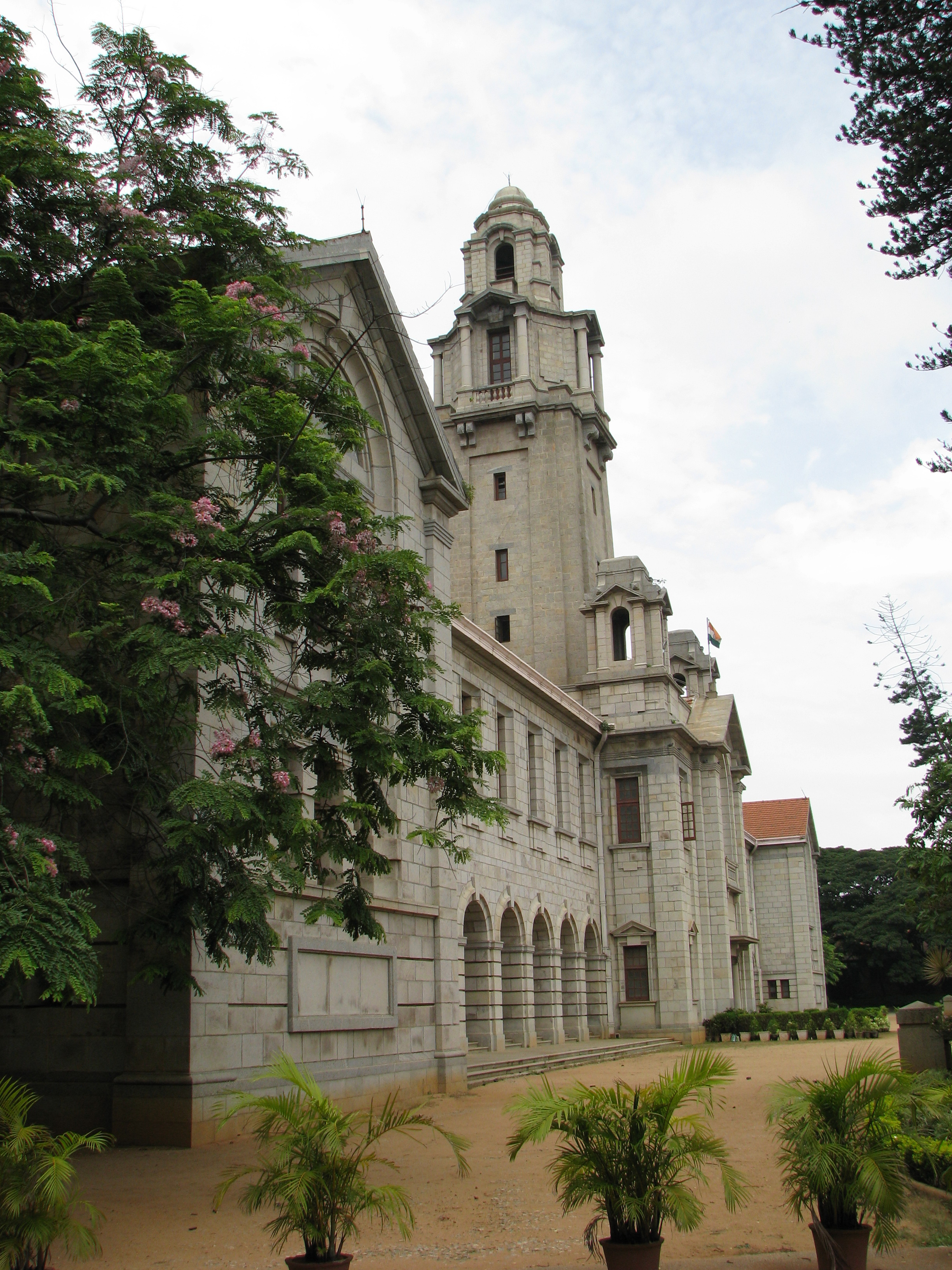
Indian Institute of Science

Utpal Tatu secured a PhD from the Indian Institute of Science (IISc). Later, completed his post doctorate research at Yale University in New Haven, Connecticut. Subsequently, he joined the IISc as a faculty at the Division of Biological Sciences and holds the position of a Professor. He heads Prof. Utpal Tatu's Lab where he hosts many post-doctoral and doctoral researchers as well as scientists. He is known for his research on malaria and the biology of molecular chaperones and his team is involved in finding new drug delivery protocols to fight the disease. Tatu's studies have been documented by way of a number of articles (Note: Please see Selected bibliography section) and the online article repository of the Indian Academy of Sciences has listed 20 of them. He also serves as an editor of the Newsletter of the Proteomics Society, India.

Tatu is a global health expert focusing on improving the methods of diagnosis and treatment of neglected infectious diseases.

The Department of Biotechnology of the Government of India awarded Tatu the National Bioscience Award for Career Development, one of the highest Indian science awards in 2008. The Indian Academy of Sciences elected him as a fellow in 2012.

== Selected scientific publications ==
1. Banumathy G, Singh V, Pavithra SR, Tatu U. Heat shock protein 90 function is essential for Plasmodium falciparum growth in human erythrocytes. J Biol Chem. 2003 May 16;278(20):18336-45, https://doi.org/10.1074/jbc.M211309200) (Citations: 199)

2. Pavithra SR, Banumathy G, Joy O, Singh V, Tatu U. Recurrent fever promotes Plasmodium falciparum development in human erythrocytes. J Biol Chem. 2004 Nov 5;279(45):46692-9, https://doi.org/10.1074/jbc.M409165200 (Citations: 73)

3. Pallavi R, Roy N, Nageshan RK, Talukdar P, Pavithra SR, Reddy R, Venketesh S, Kumar R, Gupta AK, Singh RK, Yadav SC, Tatu U. Heat shock protein 90 as a drug target against protozoan infections: biochemical characterization of HSP90 from Plasmodium falciparum and Trypanosoma evansi and evaluation of its inhibitor as a candidate drug. J Biol Chem. 2010 Dec 3;285(49):37964-75, https://doi.org/10.1074/jbc.M110.155317 (Citations: 148)

4. Nageshan RK, Roy N, Hehl AB, Tatu U. Post-transcriptional repair of a split heat shock protein 90 gene by mRNA trans-splicing. J Biol Chem. 2011 Mar 4;286(9):7116-22, https://doi.org/10.1074/jbc.C110.208389 (Citations: 37)

5. Chaubey S, Grover M, Tatu U. Endoplasmic reticulum stress triggers gametocytogenesis in the malaria parasite. J Biol Chem. 2014 Jun 13;289(24):16662-74, doi: 10.1074/jbc.M114.551549 (Citations: 87)

6. Chatterjee, S., Alampalli, S. V., Nageshan, R. K., Chettiar, S. T., Joshi, S., & Tatu, U. S. (2015). Draft genome of a commonly misdiagnosed multidrug resistant pathogen Candida auris. BMC genomics, 16(1), 686. https://doi.org/10.1186/s12864-015-1863-z (Citations: 267)

== See also ==
- Protozoan parasite
- Plasmodium falciparum
