= K. Narayanaswamy Balaji =

Indian medical researcher

K. Narayanaswamy Balaji is an Indian medical scientist. He was born in Bangalore. He holds a position at the Indian Institute of Science in Bangalore.

In 2011, he was awarded the Shanti Swarup Bhatnagar Prize for Science and Technology, the highest science award in India, in the medical sciences category.

He is also the recipient of the National Bioscience Award for Career Development, awarded in 2009.

In 2019, he retracted two and corrected three papers for image duplication.
