= Govindan Rajamohan =

Indian molecular microbiologist

- Born: India
- Known for: Studies on healthcare related infections
- Awards: 2013 N-BIOS Prize
- Scientific career
- Fields: Molecular biology; Microbiology
- Workplaces: Institute of Microbial Technology

Govindan Rajamohan (born 1970) is an Indian molecular microbiologist, biotechnologist and a Chief scientist at the CSIR-Institute of Microbial Technology. He is known for his research on healthcare related infections with special emphasis on Acinetobacter, Klebsiella, ESKAPE, Human microbiome and Thrombolysis. His studies have been documented by way of a number of articles (Note: Please see Selected bibliography section) and ResearchGate, an online repository of scientific articles has listed 21 of them. The Department of Biotechnology of the Government of India awarded him the National Bioscience Award for Career Development, one of the highest Indian science awards, for his contributions to biosciences, in 2013.

== Selected bibliography ==
- Srinivasan, Vijaya Bharathi; Rajamohan, Govindan (1 September 2013). "KpnEF, a New Member of the Klebsiella pneumoniae Cell Envelope Stress Response Regulon, Is an SMR-Type Efflux Pump Involved in Broad-Spectrum Antimicrobial Resistance". Antimicrobial Agents and Chemotherapy. 57 (9): 4449–4462. doi:10.1128/aac.02284-12. ISSN 0066-4804. PMC 3754300. PMID 23836167.
- Srinivasan, Vijaya Bharathi; Vaidyanathan, V; Mondal, A; Venkataramaiah, M; Rajamohan, Govindan (2 November 2012). "Functional characterization of a novel Mn2+ dependent protein serine/threonine kinase KpnK, produced by Klebsiella pneumoniae strain MGH78578". FEBS Letters. 586 (21): 3778–3786. doi:10.1016/j.febslet.2012.09.007. ISSN 1873-3468. PMID 23010593. S2CID 24917605.
- Srinivasan, Vijaya Bharathi; Vaidyanathan, V; Mondal, A; Rajamohan, Govindan (4 April 2012). "Role of the Two Component Signal Transduction System CpxAR in Conferring Cefepime and Chloramphenicol Resistance in Klebsiella pneumoniae NTUH-K2044". PLOS One. 7 (4) e33777. Bibcode:2012PLoSO...733777S. doi:10.1371/journal.pone.0033777. ISSN 1932-6203. PMC 3319533. PMID 22496764.
