= Ganesh Nagaraju =

Indian biochemistr and academic

- Born: Karnataka, India
- Education: Indian Institute of Science; Harvard Medical School; Beth Israel Deaconess Medical Center
- Known for: Studies on DNA damage responses, Chromosome instability genetic diseases and Cancer
- Awards: 2020 Sreenivasaya Memorial Award; 2018 Shanti Swarup Bhatnagar Prize in Biological Sciences; 2015 N-BIOS Prize; 2015 Sir C.V. Raman Young Scientist award from Government of Karnataka; 2012 B.M.Birla Science Prize in Biology; 2003 Prof. K.V. Giri memorial award for best Ph.D Thesis
- Scientific career
- Fields: Genetics; Biochemistry
- Workplaces: Indian Institute of Science

Ganesh Nagaraju is an Indian biochemist, geneticist, cancer biologist and a full professor at the Department of Biochemistry of the Indian Institute of Science. He has been studying DNA damage responses in mammalian cells, and mechanisms underlying chromosome instability genetic diseases and cancer. The Department of Biotechnology of the Government of India awarded him the National Bioscience Award for Career Development, for his contributions to biosciences, in 2015. In 2018, Nagaraju received the Shanti Swarup Bhatnagar Prize for Science and Technology in Biological Sciences from CSIR. This award is given in recognition of outstanding contributions to Science and Technology, and was described by the Indian Express as the highest award for science in India.

== Biography ==
Ganesh Nagaraju earned his PhD from the Indian Institute of Science in 2003 and did his post-doctoral research at Harvard Medical School and Beth Israel Deaconess Medical Center. On his return to India in 2007, he joined his alma mater, Indian Institute of Science, where he serves as a full professor. His research focus is on cancer biology and chromosome instability and his team is involved in developing DNA repair protocols. His studies have been documented by way of a number of articles (Note: Please see Selected bibliography section) and ResearchGate, an online repository of scientific articles has listed 38 of them. Nagaraju has delivered invited speeches at several international conferences which included the seminar on Distinct roles of RAD51 paralogs in DNA damage responses held at Centre for DNA Fingerprinting and Diagnostics on 4 October 2016 and the Indo-French Conference on Recent Advances in Genome Integrity and Plasticity held at Bengaluru in December 2017. Nagaraju also hosts several post-doctoral and doctoral researchers at his laboratory.

== Awards and honors ==
The Department of Biotechnology (DBT) of the Government of India awarded Nagaraju the National Bioscience Award for Career Development, one of the highest Indian science awards in 2015. He received Prof. K. V. Giri memorial award for best PhD Thesis in 2003, B. M. Birla Science Prize in Biology in 2012. and Sir C.V. Raman Young Scientist award from Government of Karnataka in 2015. The Council of Scientific and Industrial Research awarded him the Shanti Swarup Bhantnagar Prize in Biological Sciences for the year 2018.

== Selected bibliography ==
- Mishra, Anup; Saxena, Sneha; Kaushal, Anjali; Nagaraju, Ganesh (1 February 2018). "RAD51C/XRCC3 Facilitates Mitochondrial DNA Replication and Maintains Integrity of the Mitochondrial Genome". Molecular and Cellular Biology. 38 (3): e00489–17. doi:10.1128/MCB.00489-17. PMC 5770535. PMID 29158291.
- Somyajit, Kumar; Banik, Bhabatosh; Saxena, Sneha; Babu, Sharath; Hande, Manoor Prakash; Chakravarty, Akhil R.; Nagaraju, Ganesh (1 February 2016). "Trans -dichlorooxovandium (IV) complex as a novel photoinducible DNA interstrand crosslinker for cancer therapy". Carcinogenesis. 37 (2): 145–156. doi:10.1093/carcin/bgv173. PMID 26678223.
- Thakur, Roshan Singh; Basavaraju, Shivakumar; Khanduja, Jasbeer Singh; Muniyappa, K.; Nagaraju, Ganesh (2 October 2015). "Mycobacterium tuberculosis RecG Protein but Not RuvAB or RecA Protein Is Efficient at Remodeling the Stalled Replication Forks IMPLICATIONS FOR MULTIPLE MECHANISMS OF REPLICATION RESTART IN MYCOBACTERIA". Journal of Biological Chemistry. 290 (40): 24119–24139. doi:10.1074/jbc.M115.671164. PMC 4591802. PMID 26276393.

== See also ==
- DNA replication
- Reynolds-averaged Navier–Stokes equations
