= Ravishankar Ramachandran =

Indian molecular biologist

- Born: India
- Known for: Studies on human pathogens
- Awards: 2010 N-BIOS Prize
- Scientific career
- Fields: Molecular biology
- Institutions: Central Drug Research Institute

Ravishankar Ramachandran is an Indian molecular biologist and a senior principal scientist at the department of molecular and structural biology of the Central Drug Research Institute. Known for his studies on the molecular mechanisms of human pathogens such as Mycobacterium tuberculosis, Ramachandran is a DBT-nominated member of the Institutional Bio-Safety Committee of Babasaheb Bhimrao Ambedkar University. His studies have been documented by way of a number of articles (Note: Please see Selected bibliography section) and ResearchGate, an online repository of scientific articles has listed 142 of them. The Department of Biotechnology of the Government of India awarded him the National Bioscience Award for Career Development, one of the highest Indian science awards, for his contributions to biosciences, in 2010.

== Selected bibliography ==
- Dey, Abhishek; Shree, Sonal; Pandey, Sarvesh Kumar; Tripathi, Rama Pati; Ramachandran, Ravishankar (3 June 2016). "Crystal Structure of Mycobacterium tuberculosis H37Rv AldR (Rv2779c), a Regulator of the ald Gene DNA BINDING AND IDENTIFICATION OF SMALL MOLECULE INHIBITORS". Journal of Biological Chemistry. 291 (23): 11967–11980. doi:10.1074/jbc.m115.700484. ISSN 0021-9258. PMC 4933250. PMID 27006398.
- Khanam, Taran; Shukla, Ankita; Rai, Niyati; Ramachandran, Ravishankar (2015). "Critical determinants for substrate recognition and catalysis in the M. tuberculosis class II AP-endonuclease/3′–5′ exonuclease III". Biochimica et Biophysica Acta (BBA) - Proteins and Proteomics. 1854 (5): 505–516. doi:10.1016/j.bbapap.2015.02.019. PMID 25748880.
- Yadav, Gaya Prasad; Shree, Sonal; Maurya, Ruchi; Rai, Niyati; Singh, Diwakar Kumar; Srivastava, Kishore Kumar; Ramachandran, Ravishankar (18 December 2014). "Characterization of M. tuberculosis SerB2, an Essential HAD-Family Phosphatase, Reveals Novel Properties". PLOS ONE. 9 (12) e115409. Bibcode:2014PLoSO...9k5409Y. doi:10.1371/journal.pone.0115409. ISSN 1932-6203. PMC 4270767. PMID 25521849.

== See also ==
- Protein kinase inhibitor
- Tyrosine-kinase inhibitor
