= P. Pardha Saradhi =

Indian plant biologist

- Born: India
- Education: University of Delhi; Jamia Millia Islamia
- Known for: Studies on transgenics
- Awards: 2000 N-BIOS Prize
- Scientific career
- Fields: Plant genomics
- Workplaces: University of Delhi

P. Pardha Saradhi is an Indian plant biologist and a professor at the Department of Environmental Studies of the University of Delhi. The team led by him is reported to have developed a transgenic mustard for the first time in India. He was also in the news for filing a case of plagiarism against KVSK Prasad, his one-time student and Deepak Pental, a former vice-chancellor of Delhi University.

Saradhi did his college education at the University of Delhi, earning a BSc Honors in Botany in 1977, following it up with an MSc in 1979, MPhil in 1980 and a PhD in 1986. He started his career as a lecturer at the S. V. College of Delhi University in 1985 but moved to Jamia Millia Islamia in 1987 and worked there till 2001. He was serving as a reader when he returned to Delhi University that year to take up the position of a professor, a position he holds to date. His studies have been documented by way of a number of articles (Note: Please see Selected bibliography section) and ResearchGate, an online repository of scientific articles has listed 120 of them. Besides, he has edited one book, titled, Biophysical Processes in Living Systems. The Department of Biotechnology of the Government of India awarded him the National Bioscience Award for Career Development, one of the highest Indian science awards, for his contributions to biosciences in 2000.

== Selected bibliography ==
=== Books ===
- P. Pardha Saradhi (1 January 2001). Biophysical Processes in Living Systems. Science Publishers. ISBN 978-1-57808-157-8.

=== Articles ===
- S. RajasubramaniamP. Pardha Saradhi (1994). "Organic nitrogen stimulates caulogenesis from hypocotyl callus of Phyllanthus fraternus". Plant Cell Reports. 13 (11): 619–622. doi:10.1007/BF00232932. PMID 24196240. S2CID 9575086.
- Dhir B, Sharmila P, Pardha Saradhi P, Nasim SA (2009). "Physiological and antioxidant responses of Salvinia natans exposed to chromium-rich wastewater". Ecotoxicol Environ Saf. 72 (6): 1790–1797. Bibcode:2009EcoES..72.1790D. doi:10.1016/j.ecoenv.2009.03.015. PMID 19409614.
- Sharmila P, Kumari PK, Singh K, Prasad NV, Pardha-Saradhi P (2016). "Cadmium toxicity-induced proline accumulation is coupled to iron depletion". Protoplasma. 254 (2): 763–777. doi:10.1007/s00709-016-0988-5. PMID 27311981. S2CID 1988835.

== See also ==
- Serial analysis of gene expression
- Gene expression
- Functional genomics
