= Dibyendu Sarkar =

Indian biochemist

- Born: India
- Known for: Studies on Mycobacterium tuberculosis
- Awards: 2011 N-BIOS Prize
- Scientific career
- Fields: Molecular microbiology; Biochemistry
- Institutions: Institute of Microbial Technology

Dibyendu Sarkar is an Indian biochemist, molecular microbiologist and a Chief Scientist at the Institute of Microbial Technology. He is known for his studies on Mycobacterium tuberculosis (Mtb), the bacterial pathogen causing the disease of tuberculosis. His studies have been documented by way of a number of articles (Note: Please see Selected bibliography section) and Google Scholar, an online repository of scientific articles has listed 23 of them. He has also delivered invited speeches which included the Second Annual Meeting on Infectious Diseases held at the Indian Institute of Science in September 2017. He is an elected member of Guha Research Conference and a recipient of the Raman Research Fellowship of the Council of Scientific and Industrial Research. The Department of Biotechnology of the Government of India awarded him the National Bioscience Award for Career Development, one of the highest Indian science awards, for his contributions to biosciences, in 2011.

== Selected bibliography ==
- Bansal, Roohi; Anil Kumar, Vijjamarri; Sevalkar, Ritesh Rajesh; Singh, Prabhat Ranjan; Sarkar, Dibyendu (1 May 2017). "Mycobacterium tuberculosis virulence-regulator PhoP interacts with alternative sigma factor SigE during acid-stress response". Molecular Microbiology. 104 (3): 400–411. doi:10.1111/mmi.13635. ISSN 1365-2958. PMID 28142206.
- Sebastian Samuel, Jesse; Kumar, Deepak; Chodisetti, Sathi Babu; Agrewala, Javed N.; Singh, Balvinder; Guptasarma, Purnananda; Sarkar, Dibyendu (1 October 2015). "Probing protease sensitivity of recombinant human erythropoietin reveals α3–α4 inter-helical loop as a stability determinant". Proteins: Structure, Function, and Bioinformatics. 83 (10): 1813–1822. doi:10.1002/prot.24865. ISSN 1097-0134. PMID 26214268. S2CID 2840616.
- Gupta, Sankalp; Pathak, Anuj; Sinha, Akesh; Sarkar, Dibyendu (15 December 2009). "Mycobacterium tuberculosis PhoP Recognizes Two Adjacent Direct-Repeat Sequences To Form Head-to-Head Dimers". Journal of Bacteriology. 191 (24): 7466–7476. doi:10.1128/jb.00669-09. ISSN 0021-9193. PMC 2786591. PMID 19820095.

== See also ==
- Transcriptional regulation
- Erythropoietin
