= Asif Mohmmed =

Indian cell biologist

- Born: India
- Known for: Studies on Plasmodium falciparum
- Awards: 2011 N-BIOS Prize
- Scientific career
- Fields: Cell biology; Parasitology
- Institutions: International Centre for Genetic Engineering and Biotechnology

Asif Mohmmed is an Indian cell biologist, parasitologist and a professor at the International Centre for Genetic Engineering and Biotechnology (ICGEB), New Delhi. At ICGEB, he leads a research group on Parasite Cell Biology and is one of the key collaborators of the Tewari Lab at the School of Life Science of the University of Nottingham. He is known for his studies on Plasmodium falciparum proteases with regard to cellular Stress and parasite cell-death and protein-trafficking machinery in the pathogen, as well as the development of new anti-malarial drugs. His studies have been documented by way of a number of articles and ResearchGate, an online repository of scientific articles has listed 73 of them. The Department of Biotechnology of the Government of India awarded him the National Bioscience Award for Career Development, one of the highest Indian science awards, for his contributions to biosciences, in 2011.

== Selected bibliography ==
- Jain, Shaifali; Rathore, Sumit; Asad, Mohd; Hossain, Mohammad E.; Sinha, Dipto; Datta, Gaurav; Mohmmed, Asif (1 October 2013). "The prokaryotic ClpQ protease plays a key role in growth and development of mitochondria in Plasmodium falciparum". Cellular Microbiology. 15 (10): 1660–1673. doi:10.1111/cmi.12142. ISSN 1462-5822. PMID 23521916. S2CID 29614863.
- Mohmmed, Asif; Kishore, Shivendra; Patra, Kailash P.; Dasaradhi, Palakodeti V. N.; Malhotra, Pawan; Chauhan, Virander S. (1 May 2005). "Identification of karyopherin β as an immunogenic antigen of the malaria parasite using immune mice and human sera". Parasite Immunology. 27 (5): 197–203. doi:10.1111/j.1365-3024.2005.00759.x. ISSN 1365-3024. PMID 15987343. S2CID 31817079.
- Mohmmed, Asif; Sharma, Radhey Shyam; Ali, Sher; Babu, Cherukuri Raghavendra (1 December 2001). "Molecular diversity of the plasmid genotypes among Rhizobium gene pools of sesbanias from different habitats of a semi-arid region (Delhi)". FEMS Microbiology Letters. 205 (2): 171–178. doi:10.1111/j.1574-6968.2001.tb10943.x. ISSN 0378-1097. PMID 11750798. S2CID 14854816.

== See also ==
- Malaria vaccine
- Antimalarial medication
