= Samit Kumar Nandi =

Indian veterinary surgeon and radiologist

- Born: January 2, 1967 (age 59); West Bengal, India
- Education: West Bengal University of Animal and Fishery Sciences
- Known for: Studies on animal orthopedic surgery
- Awards: 2008 N-BIOS Prize
- Scientific career
- Fields: Veterinary Science
- Workplaces: West Bengal University of Animal and Fishery Sciences

Samit Kumar Nandi (born January 2, 1967) is an Indian veterinary surgeon, radiologist and a NATIONAL (ICAR) professor at the West Bengal University of Animal and Fishery Sciences. Known for his use of biomaterials in animal orthopedic surgeries, Nandi's studies have been documented by way of a number of articles (Note: Please see Selected bibliography section) and ResearchGate, an online repository of scientific articles has listed 97 of them. Besides, he has published three books, which include Text Book On Veterinary Surgery and Radiology and Development and Applications of Varieties of Bioactive Glass Compositions in Dental Surgery, Third Generation Tissue Engineering, Orthopaedic Surgery and as Drug Delivery System. He has also contributed chapters to books published by others.and Characterization of Biomaterials. The Department of Biotechnology of the Government of India awarded him the National Bioscience Award for Career Development, one of the highest Indian science awards, for his contributions to biosciences in 2008.

== Selected bibliography ==
=== Books ===
- Samit Kumar Nandi, Samar Halder, Mozammel Hoque (2011). Text Book On Veterinary Surgery and Radiology. Kalyani Publishers. ISBN 9788127256760.
- Samit K. Nandi; Subhasish Biswas (12 March 2013). Characterization of Biomaterials. Elsevier Science. ISBN 978-0-12-807101-4.

=== Chapters ===
- Samit K. Nandi; Subhasish Biswas (12 March 2013). "In Vivo Characterization of Biomaterials". Characterization of Biomaterials. Elsevier Science. ISBN 978-0-12-807101-4.

=== Articles ===
- Janani, G.; Nandi, Samit K.; Mandal, Biman B. (2018). "Functional hepatocyte clusters on bioactive blend silk matrices towards generating bioartificial liver constructs". Acta Biomaterialia. 67: 167–182. doi:10.1016/j.actbio.2017.11.053. PMID 29223705.
- Mehrotra, Shreya; Nandi, Samit Kumar; Mandal, Biman B. (2017-08-09). "Stacked silk-cell monolayers as a biomimetic three dimensional construct for cardiac tissue reconstruction". Journal of Materials Chemistry B. 5 (31): 6325–6338. doi:10.1039/c7tb01494e. ISSN 2050-7518. PMID 32264449.
- Nandi, Samit Kumar; Shivaram, Anish; Bose, Susmita; Bandyopadhyay, Amit (2018). "Silver nanoparticle deposited implants to treat osteomyelitis". Journal of Biomedical Materials Research Part B: Applied Biomaterials. 106 (3): 1073–1083. doi:10.1002/jbm.b.33910. ISSN 1552-4981. PMC 5685947. PMID 28508595.

== See also ==
- Veterinary surgery
- Implant (medicine)
