= Subrata Adak =

Indian biochemist

- Born: West Bengal, India
- Education: Jadavpur University
- Known for: Studies on Leishmania
- Awards: 2012 N-BIOS Prize
- Scientific career
- Fields: Chemical biology; Biochemistry
- Institutions: Indian Institute of Chemical Biology

Subrata Adak is an Indian biochemist and a senior scientist at the Indian Institute of Chemical Biology. An alumnus of Jadavpur University from where he secured a PhD, Adak is known for his studies on Leishmania, the causative pathogen of leishmaniasis. His studies have been documented by way of a number of articles (Note: Please see Selected bibliography section) and ResearchGate, an online repository of scientific articles has listed 55 of them. Besides, he has published one monograph on Leishmania where he has also contributed chapters. The Department of Biotechnology of the Government of India awarded him the National Bioscience Award for Career Development, one of the highest Indian science awards, for his contributions to biosciences, in 2012.

== Selected bibliography ==
=== Books ===
- Subrata Adak (15 January 2015). Leishmania. Caister Academic Press. ISBN 978-1-908230-53-9.

=== Articles ===
- Mukherjee, Supratim; Santara, Sumit Sen; Das, Shantanabha; Bose, Moumita; Roy, Jayasree; Adak, Subrata (12 October 2012). "NAD(P)H Cytochrome b5 Oxidoreductase Deficiency in Leishmania major Results in Impaired Linoleate Synthesis Followed by Increased Oxidative Stress and Cell Death". Journal of Biological Chemistry. 287 (42): 34992–35003. doi:10.1074/jbc.m112.389338. ISSN 0021-9258. PMC 3471740. PMID 22923617.
- Pal, Swati; Dolai, Subhankar; Yadav, Rajesh K.; Adak, Subrata (23 June 2010). "Ascorbate Peroxidase from Leishmania major Controls the Virulence of Infective Stage of Promastigotes by Regulating Oxidative Stress". PLOS ONE. 5 (6) e11271. Bibcode:2010PLoSO...511271P. doi:10.1371/journal.pone.0011271. ISSN 1932-6203. PMC 2890587. PMID 20585663.
- Pal, Swati; Dolai, Subhankar; Yadav, Rajesh K.; Adak, Subrata (23 June 2010). "Ascorbate Peroxidase from Leishmania major Controls the Virulence of Infective Stage of Promastigotes by Regulating Oxidative Stress". PLOS ONE. 5 (6) e11271. Bibcode:2010PLoSO...511271P. doi:10.1371/journal.pone.0011271. ISSN 1932-6203. PMC 2890587. PMID 20585663.
