= Indian Institute of Integrative Medicine =

Indian research facility

Indian Institute of Integrative Medicine (CSIR-IIIM)
- Type: Public / Research Institute
- Established: 1941; 85 years ago
- Affiliations: Autonomous
- Director: Dr. Zabeer Ahmed
- Administrative staff: 250
- Location: Jammu, Jammu and Kashmir, India
- Campus: Urban
- Website: http://www.iiim.res.in/index.php

Indian Institute of Integrative Medicine was established as a research and production center, known as the Drug Research Laboratory of J&K State in 1941. It was eventually taken over by the Council of Scientific & Industrial Research (CSIR) of the Government of India (December 1957) as Regional Research Laboratory, Jammu.

In order to develop technologies, medicines, and other high-value items for the domestic and foreign markets, IIIM's mission is to discover new drugs and therapeutic agents from natural products, including those with microbial and plant origins. In view of its core strength in natural products based drug discovery, the mandate of Institute was redefined in 2007 and its name changed to the Indian Institute of Integrative Medicine (IIIM). The current mandate of IIIM is to discover new drugs and therapeutic approaches from Natural Products, both of plant and microbial origin, enabled by biotechnology, to develop technologies, drugs and products of high value for the national and international markets.
