= Usha Vijayaraghavan =

Indian molecular biologist (Born:1961)

- Born: 1961 (age 64–65)
- Education: University of Delhi, Post Graduate Institute of Medical Education and Research, Chandigarh
- Known for: Molecular Genetics, Plant Development
- Spouse: K. VijayRaghavan
- Scientific career
- Workplaces: Indian Institute of Science

Usha Vijayraghavan (born. 1961) is an Indian molecular biologist. She is on the faculty of the Department of Microbiology and Cell Biology, at the Indian Institute of Science. Her major research interests are Molecular Genetics, Plant Development.

She has been featured in Women in Science.

== Education ==
Usha Vijayraghavan obtained her BSc (Hons) from University of Delhi and her MSc from Post Graduate Institute of Medical Education and Research (PGI), Chandigarh. She did her doctoral studies on yeast molecular genetics at California Institute of Technology. with Professor J Abelson. Subsequently, she worked on plant genetics as a postdoctoral fellow with Professor E Meyerowitz where she began her research on genes that regulate flowering. On returning to India, she took up a faculty position (1990) at Indian Institute of Science (IISc), Bangalore, where she is working now as professor in the Department of Microbiology and Cell Biology. Her research group at IISc uses molecular genetics and functional genomics to understand various aspects of how gene activity is regulated in yeasts and plants.

== Career ==
She took up a faculty position at Indian Institute of Science, Bangalore in 1990 and currently she is a professor in the Department of Microbiology and Cell Biology. Her research group at IISc uses molecular genetics and functional genomics to understand various aspects of how gene activity is regulated in yeasts and plants. Since joining IISc, one of Vijayaraghavan's research aims is to study genes that control flowering and plant morphology.

== Research interests ==
The department of microbiology and cell biology, under the guidance of Prof Vijayraghavan, are interested in understanding the eukaryotic gene regulation at the transcriptional and post-transcriptional levels using molecular genetics and functional genomics. The effects of such regulated gene expression on cell division and differentiation are being studied. In particular, the molecular genetic studies of pre-mRNA splicing factors; the spliceosome whose assembly is necessary for the two pre-mRNA splicing reactions. They use genetic and biochemical approaches to study spliceosome assembly, splicing reactions and the impact of pre-mRNA splicing on global gene expression.

Another project is looking into the regulatory genes controlling cell fate and cell proliferation during flower development. The overall goals are to understand the network of interactions between transcription factors and signaling molecules that controls organ formation from meristems (with stem cells). As a model system they study the formation of the rice flowering stem (inflorescence) and floral organs to elucidate functions for transcription factors in patterning.

She has a research gate score of 32.40, and an h-index of 18 (excluding self-citations). She is an Indian Science Academy Fellow (FNA-ID: P08-1472) since 2008.

== Awards and honours ==
Vijayaraghavan has been recognized for her work, and some of her accomplishments are:

- DBT-Bioscience award
- International Senior Research Fellowship of The Wellcome Trust, UK
- J. C. Bose Fellowship
- Fellowship of Indian Academy of Sciences, Bangalore in 2007
- Fellowship of Indian National Science Academy, New Delhi
- Fellowship of National Academy of Sciences, Allahabad
- National Bioscience Award for Career Development, Department of Biotechnology. Govt. of India
- Sir C. V. Raman Award
- Rockefeller Foundation Biotechnology Career Fellowship

Usha has served on the Editorial Board of the Journal of Biosciences. She has been serving as associate editor for the Journal of Genetics.
