= Pawan Gupta =

Indian biotechnologist, immunobiologist, cell biologist

- Born: 15 August 1975 (age 50); India
- Known for: Studies on host-pathogen interaction of Mycobacterium tuberculosis
- Awards: 2015 N-BIOS Prize
- Scientific career
- Fields: Biotechnology; Immunobiology; Cell biology
- Institutions: Institute of Microbial Technology

Pawan Gupta is an Indian biotechnologist, immunobiologist, cell biologist and a senior principal scientist at the Institute of Microbial Technology of the Council of Scientific and Industrial Research. He is known for his studies on Nuclear Receptors in Chronic Inflammatory Disorders and host-pathogen interaction of Mycobacterium tuberculosis. His studies have been documented by way of a number of articles (Note: Please see Selected bibliography section) and ResearchGate, an online repository of scientific articles has listed 66 of them. The Department of Biotechnology of the Government of India awarded him the DBT IYBA Award in 2009 and National Bioscience Award for Career Development, one of the highest Indian science awards, for his contributions to biosciences, in 2015.

== Selected bibliography ==
- Nanduri, R., Kalra, R., Bhagyaraj, E., Chacko, A.P., Ahuja, N., Tiwari, D., Kumar, S., Jain, M., Parkesh, R., and Gupta, P. (2019) AutophagySMDB: a curated database of small molecules that modulate protein targets regulating autophagy. Autophagy 15, 1280-1295.
- Chandra, V., Bhagyaraj, E., Nanduri, R., Ahuja, N., and Gupta, P. (2015) NR1D1 ameliorates Mycobacterium tuberculosis clearance through regulation of autophagy. Autophagy 11, 1987-1997
- Kalra, R., Bhagyaraj, E., Tiwari, D., Nanduri, R., Chacko, A.P., Jain, M., Mahajan, S., Khatri, N., and Gupta, P. (2018) AIRE promotes androgen-independent prostate cancer by directly regulating IL-6 and modulating tumor microenvironment. Oncogenesis 7, 43.
- Bhagyaraj, E., Tiwari, D., Ahuja, N., Nanduri, R., Saini, A., Kalra, R., Kumar, S., Janmeja, A.K., and Gupta, P. (2018) A human xenobiotic nuclear receptor contributes to nonresponsiveness of Mycobacterium tuberculosis to the antituberculosis drug rifampicin. Journal of Biological Chemistry 293, 3747-3757
- Bhagyaraj, E., Nanduri, R., Saini, A., Dkhar, H. K., Ahuja, N., Chandra, V., Mahajan, S., Kalra, R., Tiwari, D., Sharma, C., Janmeja, A. K., and Gupta, P. (2016) Human Xenobiotic Nuclear Receptor PXR Augments Mycobacterium tuberculosis Survival. J Immunol 197, 244-255
