= National Centre for Cell Science =

Research institute in Pune, India

National Centre For Cell Science (NCCS)
- Established: 1986; 40 years ago
- Field of research: Cell Biology
- Director: Prof. Thomas J Pucadyil
- Location: Pune, Maharashtra, India
- Campus: Urban
- Operating agency: Biotechnology Research and Innovation Council, Ministry of Science and Technology, Government of India
- Website: www.nccs.res.in

The National Centre for Cell Science is a National Level, Biotechnology, Tissue Engineering and Tissue Banking research center located on the campus of University of Pune in Pune, India. The institute formerly known as National Facility for Animal Tissue and Cell Culture, is one of the premier research centers in India, which works on cell-culture, cell-repository, immunology, chromatin-remodelling.

== See also ==
- International Biotech Park, Hinjawadi, Pune
