= Roboy =

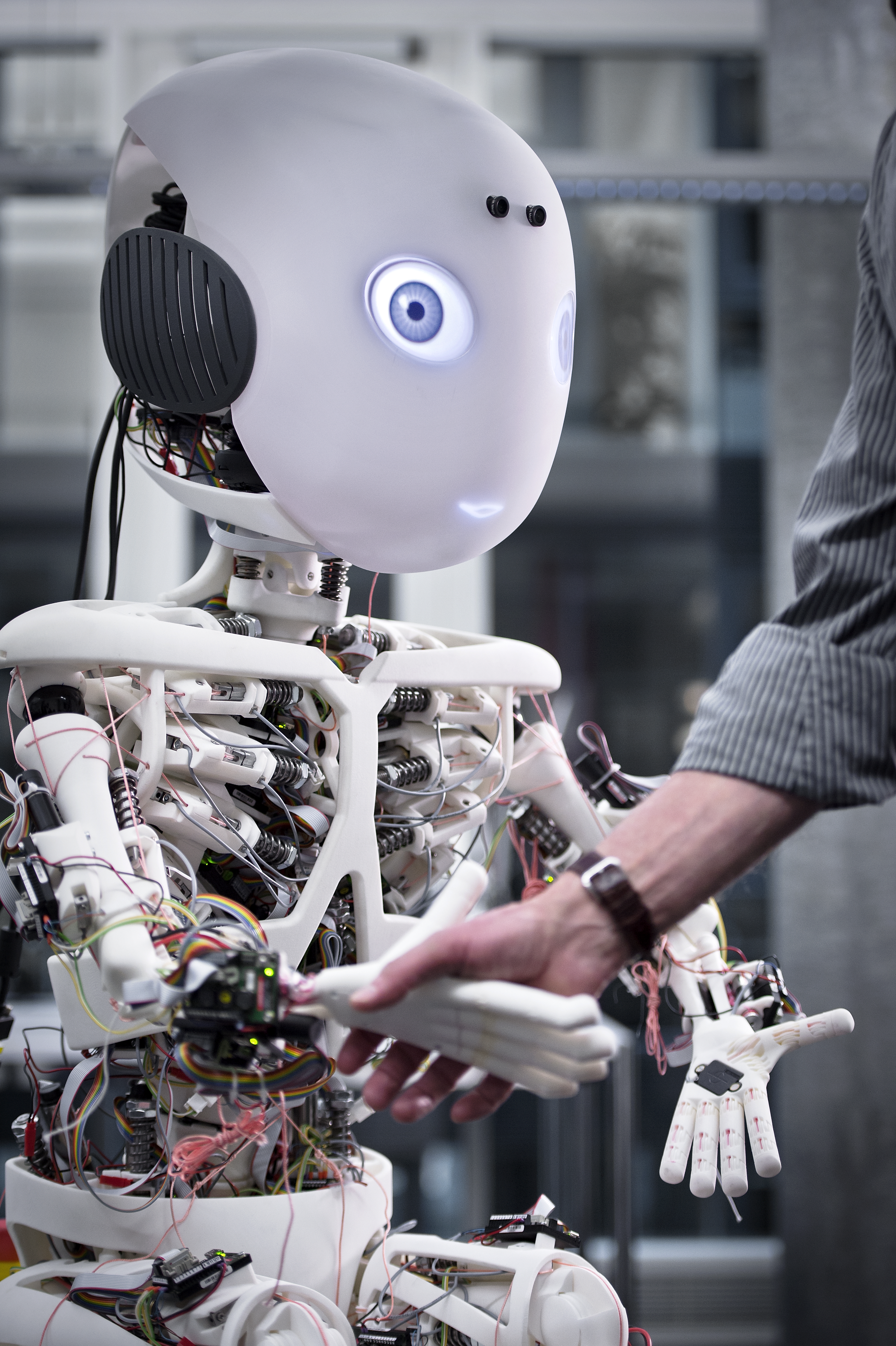
- First presentation in 2013
- Inventor: Rolf Pfeifer, Pascal Kaufmann (University of Zurich)
- Country: Switzerland
- Year of creation: 2013
- Type: Humanoid
- Website: roboy.org

Roboy was a advanced humanoid robot that was developed at the Artificial Intelligence Laboratory of the University of Zurich, and was publicly presented on March 8, 2013. Originally designed to emulate humans with the future possibility of helping out in daily environments, Roboy is a project that has involved both engineers and scientists. Initiated in 2012 by Pascal Kaufmann, Roboy is the work of engineers who designed him according to design principles developed by Rolf Pfeifer, the AI lab director, in conjunction with the assistance of other development partners. Both the team members and the partners of the Roboy project share a commitment toward continued research in the area of soft robotics. Later Roboy was moved to Munich, Germany, where Rafael Hostettler conducts research on it at the Technical University. Since July 2020, Roboy is located back in Zurich, Switzerland in the offices of the Mindfire Foundation.

== History ==
=== ECCE Robot ===
In general, standard humanoid robots mimic the human form, but the mechanisms used in them are very different from those that are in humans. The characteristics of these robots consequently reflect this difference. This places severe limitations on the kinds of interactions standard robots can engage in, the knowledge they can acquire of their environment, and thus on the nature of their cognitive engagement with the environment. Therefore, in 2011, a robotic project was launched in the European Union and it resulted in the development of the ECCE robot. Led by Owen Holland of the University of Sussex, the ECCE project developed a new kind of robot that was modeled after the human anatomy. ECCE stands for Embodied Cognition in a Compliantly Engineered Robot, and the goal of the project was to develop an anthropomimetic robot whose body moves and interacts with the physical world in the same way flesh human bodies do. As athropomimetic, the robot copies not only the outward shape or form of a human body, but also copies the inner structures and mechanisms, such as bones, joints, muscles, and tendons. With these human-like mechanisms the robot has the potential for human-like action and interaction in the world.

Project objectives:

- To design and build an anthropomimetic robot torso mounted on a powered mobile platform
- To develop methods of characterising such robots in terms of the information flows emerging from their human-like intrinsic dynamics and sensory-motor coupling
- To investigate ways of controlling the robot during movement, interaction, and mobile manipulation, and to combine the successful control strategies in a single architecture deploying them appropriately according to circumstances and tasks
- To exploit the anthropomimetic nature of the robot in order to achieve some human-like cognitive characteristics through sensory-motor control
- To evaluate the functional and cognitive abilities of the robot, both absolutely, and in comparison with a state of the art conventional robot

The ECCE robot became a research platform. It uses many cables with a certain degree of elasticity to act as muscles and tendons. Like in a human body, all of the muscles and tendons need to be coordinated in order to get meaningful movement. To achieve this, there are 45 motors embedded in the robotic body that pull on the cables to make the body move. This allows the robot to have better potential to work in an unstructured human environment than a typical robot. The idea was to outsource the computation for the mechanics of the human body, like using passive compliance to make it absorb the energy in the right way to allow for safe interactions and to store energy in the muscles that can then be released to produce fast movements.

=== Development ===
With ECCE as its starting point, Roboy was conceived in 2011 via project coordination between research institutions and industry partners. At 1.2 m (3.9 ft), Roboy was designed to have the appearance of a child and to one day be used as a helper robot for the sick and elderly. Unlike more traditional robots, which have motors in their joints, Roboy is tendon-driven, allowing for more fluent, human-like movements. The walking movements of humans were acutely studied and then tweaked to result in a walking behavior similar to that of a human being. The anatomy of Roboy is very similar to the human anatomy. The spine consists of many vertebras connected by cords and balls to represent the spinal cord. As for the head and face of Roboy, it was designed completely from scratch and the community on Facebook collaborated to decide which head was the most liked. Further, Brain technology and Artificial Intelligence software which run the brain of Roboy can allow him to blush in certain situations, such as after receiving a compliment or while being hugged. In 2013, Roboy was to be presented at the "Robots on Tour" robotic fair that took place in Zurich, Switzerland on March 8. In order to achieve this, the development team had to finish the entire project in 9 months. This was made possible by means of crowdfunding. In return, all of the contributors' names were engraved on Roboy itself. The development of Roboy Junior, i.e. mechanic and software, was conducted Open source. Therefore, all the expertise, ideas, and inventions were not provided by just one specific entity so anyone had the chance to contribute to the technology. Today, Roboy Junior is meant to be an initial spark to trigger the work towards a generic anthropomimetic research platform.

== Technical specifications ==
- Anthropomimetic, compliant and tendon driven design
- Childlike morphology
- 3D printed skeletal structure, SLS, Polyamide
- 48 motor units with Maxon BLDC motors, 5, 25, 30 Watt
- Relative encoders, 512 CPT
- Custom absolute position sensor, using an inductive linear sensor
- Series elastic construction with geometrically non-linear spring
- Force and position control
- EPOS 2 motor controller boards with CanOpen interface
- 142 cm tall, 50.75 cm wide
- 30 kg total mass
- Overactuated shoulder joint
- Capacitive touch sensors in the hands, for triggering hand closing motions
- Projected face, allowing for fast depiction of emotions
- Stereo cameras
- Microphone

=== Degrees of Freedom / Motors ===
- Total: ~28 DOF, 48 Motors
- Head: 3 DOF, 4 Motors
- Spine/Chest: ~3 DOF, 4 Motors
- Arms (x2): 6 DOF, 12 Motors
- Hands (x2): 1 DOF, 1 Motor
- Hip/Legs (x2): 4 DOF, 7 Motors

== Research collaborations ==
=== Myorobotics ===
There is a close collaboration between Roboy and the ongoing EU Research Project Myorobotics. The “muscles” of Roboy are modular, and replicated throughout his body. Myorobotics is taking this idea further, developing bone and joint modules as well in order to create a robotics toolkit for tendon driven robots that can be designed, simulated, optimized and controlled in one coherent framework.

=== The Human Brain Project ===
In the European Union 1 Billion € flagship Human Brain Project, simulated brains are being built. The Roboy team, in close collaboration with the head of the Neurorobotics part of the project, Alois Christian Knoll from the Technical University of Munich, provides a basis for the robots to be used in the project. Their goals are to find insights on how to control complex soft robots and also to bring virtual brains into physical reality.

=== The University of Melbourne ===
The robotics research group at the University of Melbourne has a strong theoretical background in controlling muscle-like tendon-driven systems. In a close collaboration with Darwin Lau and Denny Oetomo, the Roboy team provides them with their hardware, while in return their knowledge is being transferred into the software, improving the control and ability of Roboy.

== Roboy at school ==
"Roboy at school" is an initiative of the Roboy team that was founded in order to spark the interest of teenagers in the natural sciences.

== Roboy in Arts and Culture ==
Roboy also cooperated with artistic initiatives like the Republic of Užupis, where he served as an official consul. At Ars Electronica Festival 2019, Roboy naturalized people via a chatbot and contributed to the formulation of a constitutional right for artificial intelligences.
