= Nihar Ranjan Jana =

Indian neuroscientist

- Born: 1965 (age 60–61); India
- Education: Calcutta University; Visva-Bharati University; RIKEN Brain Science Institute
- Known for: Studies on E3 ubiquitin ligases
- Awards: 2008 N-BIOS Prize; 2012 VASVIK Industrial Research Award
- Scientific career
- Fields: Neurosciences; Huntington's disease
- Workplaces: RIKEN Brain Science Institute; National Brain Research Centre; IIT Kharagpur

Nihar Ranjan Jana (born 1965) is an Indian neuroscientist and professor at the IIT Kharagpur, known for his studies on E3 ubiquitin ligases, protein homeostasis and neurodegenerative disorders. Jana is an elected fellow of the National Academy of Sciences, India. The Department of Biotechnology of the Government of India awarded him the National Bioscience Award for Career Development, in 2008 and TATA Innovation Fellowship in 2014 for his contributions to Neurodegenerative diseases.

== Biography ==
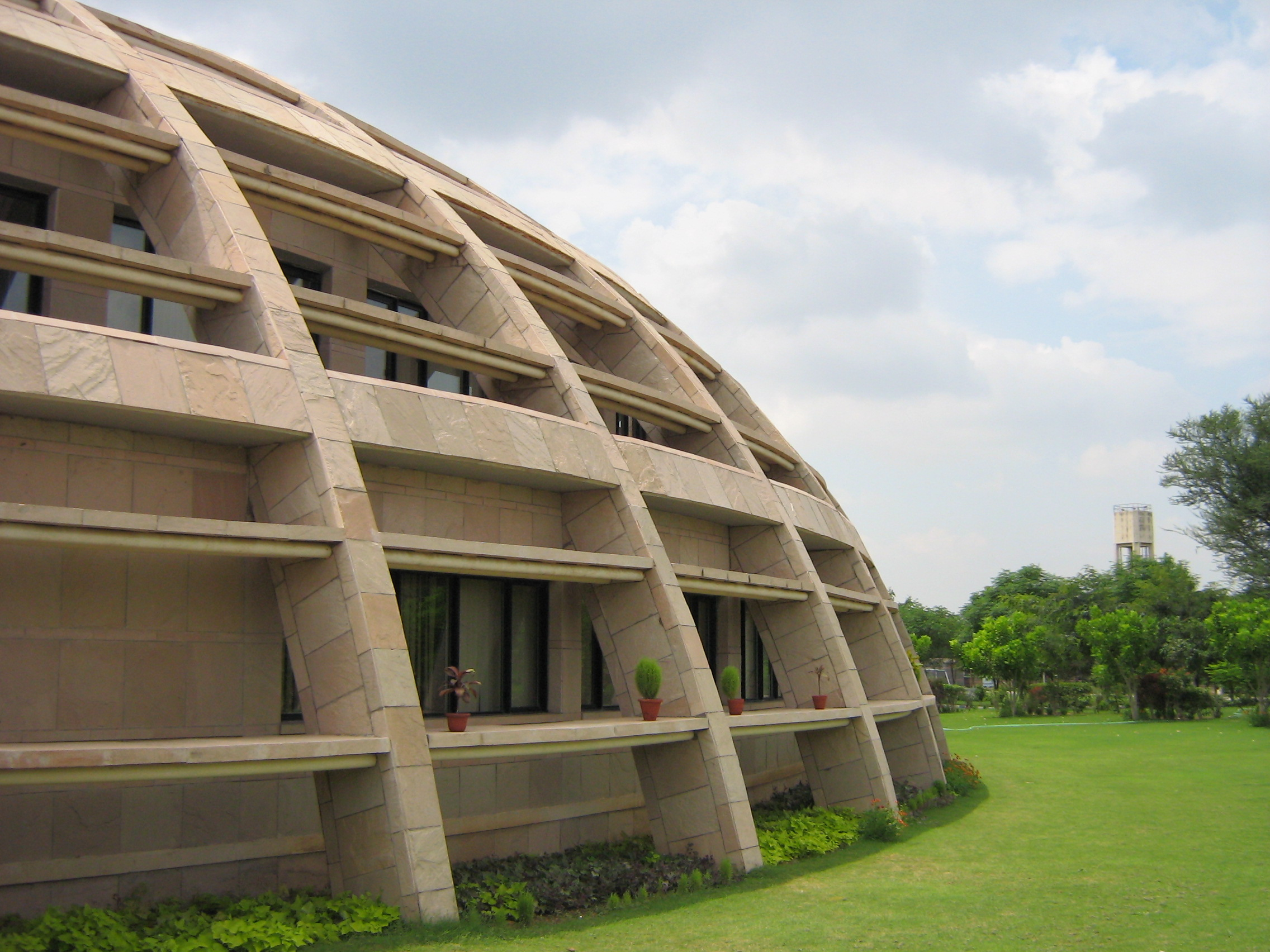
National Brain Research Centre.

Nihar Ranjan Jana, born in 1965, did his graduation (Midnapore College) and post graduation at Calcutta University, doctoral studies at the Visva-Bharati University and after securing a PhD in 1996, he completed his post-doctoral work at RIKEN Brain Science Institute, Japan. On his return to India, he joined the National Brain Research Centre (NBRC) as a faculty member in 2001. He served as faculty at National Brain Research Centre up to May 2018 and then moved to IIT Kharagpur, where he joined as Professor in the School of Bioscience.

Jana resides in IIT Kharagpur, in West Bengal.

== Legacy ==
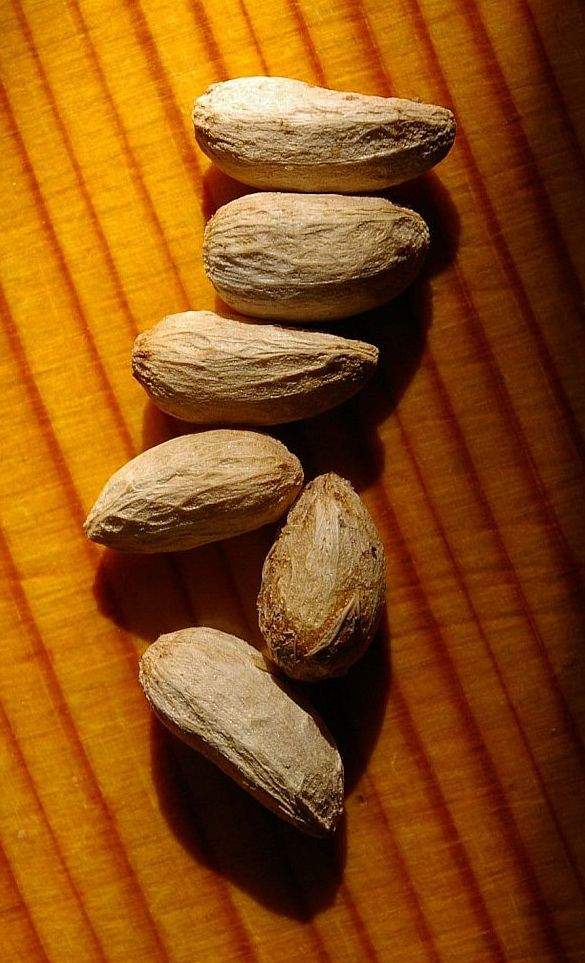
Neem tree seeds

Jana is involved in the research on neurological disorders caused by proteopathy and has carried out investigations on the role of E3 ubiquitin ligases as a causative factor. He has demonstrated how the ligases control cellular protein quality and how the absence of such an activity caused neuronal dysfunction or neurodegeneration. He led a team of scientists from NBRC and Bose Institute who conducted experiments on Huntington's disease, an inherited neurological disorder which led to the death of brain cells, and suggested azadiradione, a compound found in the seeds of Azadirachta indica (commonly known as neem) as a possible therapeutic molecule. He has also identified new targets in diseases such as Lafora disease, a form of epilepsy, autism and Angelman syndrome which has reportedly widened the understanding of their pathogenesis. His studies have been documented by way of a number of articles (Note: Please see Selected bibliography section) and ResearchGate, an online repository of scientific articles has listed 94 of them.

Jana was a member of the Neurobiology Task force of the Department of Biotechnology. He has delivered keynote or invited speeches at seminars such as the International Conference on Neurodegenerative Diseases: Pathogenesis to Therapy - 2015 held at the Indian Institute of Science, Bengaluru and the IAN 2017 of the Indian Academy of Neurosciences held at Ravenshaw University, Cuttack.

== Awards and honors ==
The Department of Biotechnology of the Government of India awarded him the National Bioscience Award for Career Development, one of the highest Indian science awards in 2008 and the National Academy of Sciences, India elected him as a fellow the same year. He is also an elected fellow of the West Bengal Academy of Science and Technology and in 2012, he received the VASVIK Industrial Research Award for what the award citation mentioned as pioneering work on Huntington's disease. The award orations delivered by him include the 2013 edition of the K. T. Shetty Memorial Oration of the Indian Academy of Neurosciences.

== Selected bibliography ==
- Singh, Brijesh Kumar; Vatsa, Naman; Nelson, Vinod K.; Kumar, Vipendra; Kumar, Shashi Shekhar; Mandal, Subhash C.; Pal, Mahadeb; Jana, Nihar Ranjan (2 January 2018). "Azadiradione Restores Protein Quality Control and Ameliorates the Disease Pathogenesis in a Mouse Model of Huntington's Disease". Molecular Neurobiology. 55 (8): 6337–6346. doi:10.1007/s12035-017-0853-3. ISSN 0893-7648. PMID 29294248. S2CID 12720344.
- Singh, Brijesh Kumar; Vatsa, Naman; Kumar, Vipendra; Shekhar, Shashi; Sharma, Ankit; Jana, Nihar Ranjan (15 October 2017). "Ube3a deficiency inhibits amyloid plaque formation in APPswe/PS1δE9 mouse model of Alzheimer's disease". Human Molecular Genetics. 26 (20): 4042–4054. doi:10.1093/hmg/ddx295. ISSN 0964-6906. PMID 29016862.

== See also ==
- Prakash Narain Tandon
- Model organism
