= Zilles =

Zilles is a German surname. Notable people with the surname include:

- Karl Zilles (1944–2020), German neuroscientist and anatomist
- Sandra Zilles, German and Canadian computer scientist
