= Zille =

Zille may refer to:

- Heinrich Zille (1858–1929), German artist
- Helen Zille (born 1951), South African politician
- Zille (boat), a type of small barge used on the Danube river and tributaries in Germany and Austria

== See also ==
- 15724 Zille, an asteroid
- Zilles, a German surname
