= Katrin Amunts =

German university teacher and neurologist

- Citizenship: German
- Known for: Brain mapping, Julich Brain Atlas, Human Brain Project, EBRAINS
- Scientific career
- Fields: Neuroscientist
- Workplaces: University of Düsseldorf, Forschungszentrum Jülich
- Website: https://julich-brain-atlas.de/

Katrin Amunts is a German neuroscientist. She is the Director of the C. and O. Vogt Institute for Brain Research at the University of Düsseldorf and is also Director of the Institute of Neuroscience and Medicine INM-1 at Forschungszentrum Jülich. She is one of the most prominent neuroscientists in brain mapping in the world. From 2016 until 2023, she was Scientific Research Director of the Human Brain Project (HBP). Since 2024, she has served as joint CEO of EBRAINS, Europe's digital research infrastructure for brain research, which emerged from the HBP.

== Career ==
Katrin Amunts was born in Potsdam, Germany in 1962. From 1981 to 1987, Katrin Amunts studied medicine with a focus on biophysics at the Second Medical Institute of the Russian State Medical University in Moscow. After earning her doctorate in Moscow, Amunts initially served as a research assistant at the Fraunhofer Institute for Production Systems and Design Technology in Berlin before joining Karl Zilles at the Cécile and Oskar Vogt Institute for Brain Research at Heinrich Heine University Düsseldorf in 1992. In 1999, she completed her residency in anatomy, and the following year she also earned her habilitation in that field. From 1999, Katrin Amunts was as a research group leader at the Institute of Medicine at Forschungszentrum Jülich. From 2004 to 2006, Amunts led a junior research group funded by the Helmholtz Association.

From 2004 to 2013, Amunts was a professor of structural-functional brain mapping at the Department of Psychiatry, Psychotherapy, and Psychosomatics at Aachen University Hospital, where she also headed the Section for Structural-Functional Brain Mapping beginning in 2008. Since 2013, she has been a professor of brain research at Heinrich Heine University Düsseldorf and director of the Cécile and Oskar Vogt Institute for Brain Research at the University Hospital Düsseldorf, thus, succeeding her mentor and patron Karl Zilles. Since 2008, she has also served as Director of the Institute for Neuroscience and Medicine (INM-1) at Forschungszentrum Jülich.

From 2013 to 2023, Amunts served as the scientific director of the European Union's Flagship Human Brain Project (HBP). The HBP brought together 155 institutions from 19 countries and had a total budget of 607 million euros. The project’s goal was to gain a better understanding of how the human brain works through interdisciplinary research and to develop new methods in the fields of high-performance computing, data analysis, and artificial intelligence.

The Human Brain Project gave rise to the EBRAINS (European Brain Research Infrastructures) research infrastructure, a European digital platform for the neurosciences. It enables the integration of brain atlases with clinical and experimental data and supports European research collaborations. Amunts has been Joint CEO of EBRAINS since 2024.

In addition, she is working on the further development of the BigBrain model as part of the German-Canadian project HIBALL (Helmholtz International BigBrain Analytics Learning Laboratory). This project involves the development of new, high-resolution brain models that integrate macro- and microstructures and contribute to the analysis of brain connectivity.

In April 2012, she was appointed to the German Ethics Council, where she served until April 2020, serving as vice chair beginning in 2016.

== Research ==
Amunts works in the field of brain research at the intersection of neuroscience, medicine, and computer-aided modeling. At the Forschungszentrum Jülich, she collaborated with Karl Zilles and her team to develop the Julich Brain Atlas, the first three-dimensional atlas of the human brain. It comprises over 260 maps (as of 2026) of individual brain regions and is freely available to the scientific community.

In collaboration with Canadian neuroscientist Alan Evans, the “BigBrain” project was launched in 2013—an ultra-high-resolution, three-dimensional model of the human brain with a level of detail extending down to the cellular level. The distributions and densities of nerve cells depicted in this model are used, among other things, for the mathematical modeling of patients’ brains and serve as the basis for approaches in personalized medicine.

The concept of a multimodal brain atlas developed by Zilles and Amunts integrates not only the cytoarchitectonic organization but also data on connectivity, gene expression, and receptor distribution. Among other techniques, autoradiography is used to visualize receptor densities, and Polarized Light Imaging (3D-PLI) is employed to examine axonal architecture.

== Awards ==
- 2025: Honorary Doctorate from Maastricht University (UM), Maastricht, Netherlands
- 2023: Justine and Yves Sergent Award, Justine and Yves Sergent Fund, University of Montreal, Canada
- 2022: Federal Cross of Merit, 1st Class, Federal Republic of Germany
- 2022: Hector Science Prize, Hector Foundations, Weinheim

== Memberships and roles (selection) ==
- Since 2023: Member of the Psychology and Cognitive Sciences Section of the German National Academy of Sciences Leopoldina
- Since 2022: Member of the Hector Fellow Academy, Karlsruhe
- Since 2017: Member of the North Rhine-Westphalian Academy of Sciences, Humanities and Arts
- Since 2021: Spokesperson for the Joint Lab ‘Supercomputing and Modelling for the Human Brain’ (SMHB), Helmholtz Association of German Research Centres
- Since 2017: Co-spokesperson for the Max Planck School of Cognition, Max Planck Society, Munich
- German Academy of Science and Engineering (acatech)

== Publications (Selection) ==
- Dickscheid, T, et al. (2026). Siibra: a software tool suite for realizing a Multilevel Human Brain Atlas from complex data resources. Nat Methods 23, 1647–1658. https://doi.org/10.1038/s41592-026-03159-x
- Amunts, K. (2026). The Vogt Collection – Reactivating a treasure facilitating brain research, neurology and psychiatry. Brain. 149(1): 2-5. https://doi.org/10.1093/brain/awaf365
- Amunts, K. et al. (2024): The coming decade of digital brain research: A vision for neuroscience at the intersection of technology and computing. Imaging Neuroscience: 1-35. DOI:10.1162/imag_a_00137
- Axer, M., Amunts, K. (2022): Scale matters – the nested human connectome. Science, 378:500-504. https://doi.org/10.1126/science.abq2599
- Paquola, C., Amunts, K., Evans, A., Smallwood, J., Bernhardt, B. (2022): Closing the mechanistic gap: the value of microarchitecture in understanding cognitive networks. In: Trends Cogn Sci. 26, 10, p. 873–886. doi:10.1016/j.tics.2022.07.001
- Amunts K., Lippert T. (2021): Brain research challenges supercomputing. Science, 374 (6571): 1054 - 1055. (IF: 47.728). https://doi.org/10.1126/science.abl8519
- Amunts K., Mohlberg H., Bludau S., Zilles K. (2020). Julich-Brain – a 3D probabilistic atlas of human brain’s cytoarchitecture. Science, 369:988-992. https://doi.org/10.1126/science.abb4588
- Wagstyl K., et al. (2020). BigBrain 3D atlas of cortical layers: Cortical and laminar thickness gradients diverge in sensory and motor cortices. PLoS Biology, 18(4):e3000678. https://doi.org/10.1371/journal.pbio.3000678
- Stacho M., Herold C., Rook N., Wagner H., Axer M., Amunts K., Güntürkün O. (2020). A cortex-like canonical circuit in the avian forebrain. Science, 369: 1585. DOI: 10.1126/science.abc553
- Kiwitz, K., Schiffer, C., Spitzer, H., Dickscheid, T., Amunts, K. (2020). Deep learning networks reflect cytoarchitectonic features used in brain mapping. Scientific Reports, 10:22039. https://doi.org/10.1038/s41598-020-78638-y
- Grodzinsky Y, Deschamps I, Pieperhoff P, Iannilli F, Agmon G, Loewenstein Y, Amunts K (2020). Logical negation mapped onto the brain. Brain Structure and Function, 225(1):19-31. https://doi.org/10.1007/s00429-019-01975-w
- Genon, S., Reid, A., Langner, Amunts, K. Eickhoff, S. B. (2018): How to Characterize the Function of a Brain Region. In: Trends Cogn Sci. Band 22, Nr. 4, S. 350–364. doi:10.1016/j.tics.2018.01.010.
- Salles A. et al (2019). The Human Brain Project: Responsible brain research for the benefit of society. Neuron, 101(3):380-384. doi: 10.1016/j.neuron.2019.01.005
- Amunts K (2018). Big-data studies need to be part of policy discussion. Nature Human Behaviour, 2(2):94. https://doi.org/10.1038/s41562-018-0292-9
- Mazziotta, J. et al (2001): A probabilistic atlas and reference system for the human brain: International Consortium for Brain Mapping (ICBM). In: Philos Trans R Soc Lond B Biol Sci. Band 356,1412, p. 1293–1322. doi:10.1098/rstb.2001.0915.
- Amunts, K., Schleicher, A., Bürgel, U., Mohlberg, H., Uylings, H.B., Zilles K. (1999): Broca's region revisited: cytoarchitecture and intersubject variability. In: J Comp Neurol. Band 412, 2, p. 319–341. DOI: 10.1002/(sici)1096-9861(19990920)412:2<319::aid-cne10>3.0.co;2-7
