= China Brain Project =

Chinese neuroscience program

- 中国脑计划
- Type of project: Scientific research
- Location: China
- Owner: Chinese Academy of Sciences
- Established: 2016

The China Brain Project (Chinese: 中国脑计划) is a 15-year project, approved by the Chinese National People's Congress in March 2016 as part of the 13th Five-Year Plan (2016–2020); it is one of four pilot programs of the Innovation of Science and Technology Forward 2030 program, targeted at research into the neural basis of cognitive function. Additional goals include improving diagnosis and prevention of brain diseases and driving information technology and artificial intelligence projects that are inspired by the brain.

The China Brain Project prioritizes brain-inspired AI over other approaches. The project is addressing legal, ethical, and social issues related to brain emulation (neuroethics) according to international standards and Chinese values. The project is supported by the Chinese Academy of Sciences' (CAS) Centre for Excellence in Brain Science and Intelligence, and a consortium of laboratories at over twenty CAS institutes and universities.

== See also ==
- Artificial brain
- BRAIN Initiative
- Brain/MINDS
- Human Brain Project
