= Pascal Kaufmann =

Swiss technology entrepreneur

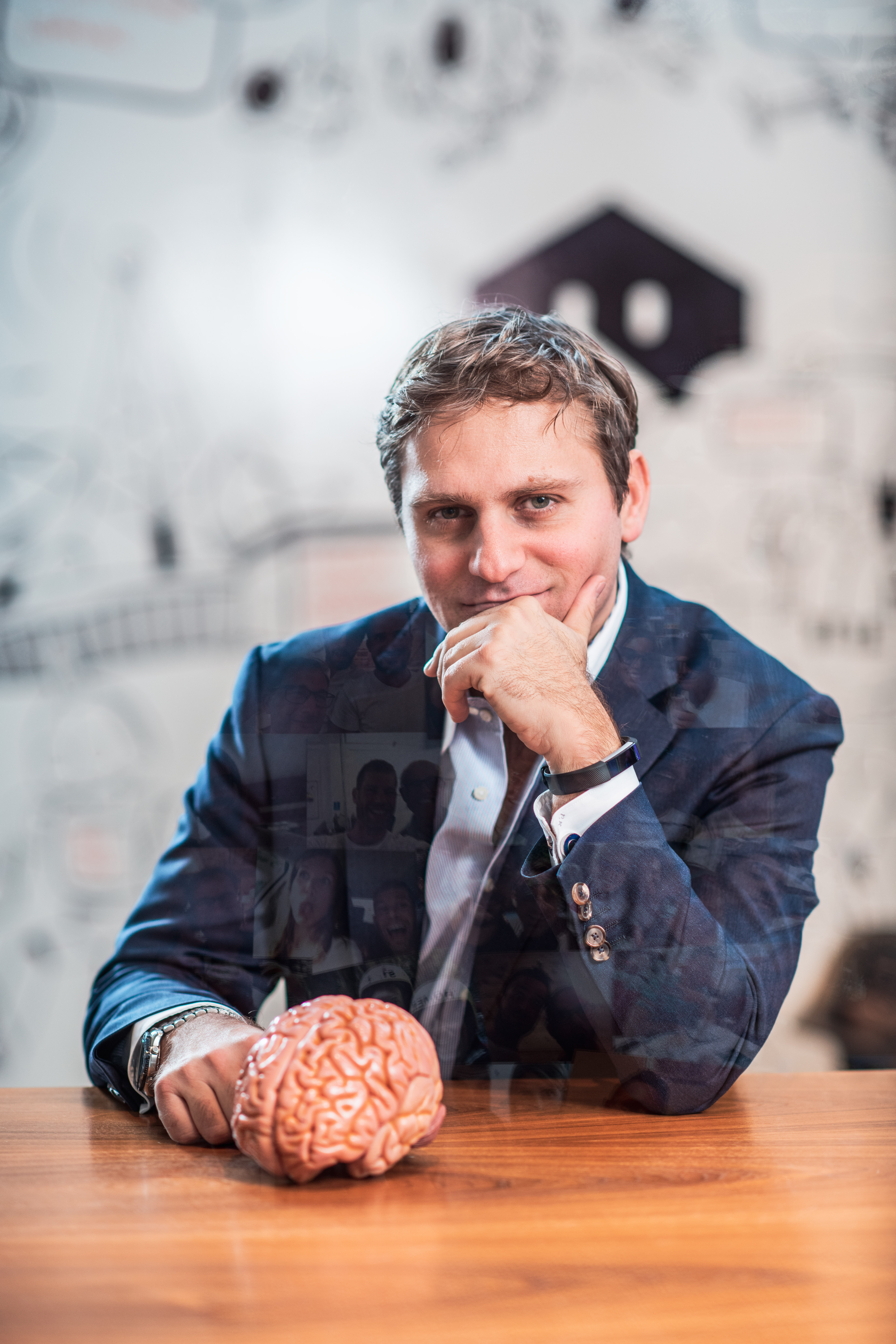
- Born: March 19, 1978 (age 47); Zurich, Switzerland
- Occupation(s): Co-Founder together with Marc Vontobel of Starmind International, Founder of Mindfire Foundation, co-founder of AlpineAI
- Known for: Cyborg Technology, Neuroscience, Artificial Intelligence, Humanoid Robotics, Brain Technology

Pascal Kaufmann is a Swiss tech entrepreneur.

== Early life ==
Pascal Kaufmann was born in Zurich, Switzerland. He joined the Kantonsschule Zürcher Unterland (KZU) with a focus on ancient languages and philosophy. Kaufmann received his master's degree in Neuroscience and Economics at the Swiss Federal Institute of Technology (ETH) in Zurich and Northwestern University in Evanston, Illinois, United States.

== Career ==
In 2012, while at the Artificial Intelligence Laboratory of the University of Zurich Kaufmann initiated and developed a humanoid robot called Roboy, with Rolf Pfeifer. Roboy aims to combine insights from the field of embodied intelligence research and of robotics.

Kaufmann takes on a more skeptical view on the current state of AI, in particular about the analogy that the brain is comparable to a computer.

His vision "to think with the power of 1,000 brains" gave rise to the concept of the "Corporate Brain" which is today the core technology of the software company Starmind International which he founded with Marc Vontobel in 2010. The company is based in Zurich, Switzerland and has operations in New York and Frankfurt.

In 2017, Kaufmann initiated the non-profit Mindfire foundation dedicated to progressing AI openly, responsibly and ethically. In 2019, he gave rise to the Mindfire Group. Ultimately, to use the power of human level AI to solve our most pressing global challenges. As part of this effort, he founded Lab42 in Davos in 2022, an international research laboratory focused on developing human-level AI through a politically neutral and interdisciplinary approach. Kaufmann ist president of the Swiss AI Award dedicated to promoting artificial intelligence. In 2023, he co-founded the Swiss AI startup AlpineAI.
