= Hideyuki Okano =

Prof. Hideyuki Okano MD, Ph.D.
- 岡野栄之
- Born: January 26, 1959 (age 67); Tokyo, Japan
- Occupation: Dean of Keio University School of Medicine
- Awards: Medal of Honor with Purple Ribbon (2009)

Academic work
- Main interests: Brain Mapping, MRI, Transgenic Marmosets, Development and regeneration of central nervous system
- Website: http://www.okano-lab.com/

Hideyuki Okano (Japanese: 岡野栄之) (born 26 January 1959 in Tokyo, Japan) is a Japanese physiology professor and the current dean of Keio University School of Medicine. He is also the team leader of the Laboratory for Marmoset Neural Architecture, at RIKEN Brain Science Institute. His lab is the first in the world to produce transgenic marmosets (Callithrix jacchus) with germline transmission. He is a director of the International Society for Stem Cell Research.

== Academic life ==
Okano graduated from Keio University School of Medicine in 1983. He worked for Johns Hopkins University School of Medicine between 1989 and 1993. He was a professor at University of Tsukuba and Osaka University before returning to his home university in 2001. Since 2001, he is a professor at Keio University.

== Selected honors and awards ==
- Erwin von Bälz Award (from Boehringer Ingelheim) in 2014
- A Medal of Honor with Purple Ribbon in 2009
- Distinguished Scientist Award (from University of Catania, School of Pharmacy) in 2004
