= Vijayalakshmi Ravindranath =

Indian neuroscientist

- Born: 18 October 1953 (age 72); Chennai, India
- Education: Andhra University, Mysore University
- Known for: Promoting neuroscience research and establishing major neuroscience research centres in India
- Awards: Shanti Swarup Bhatnagar Prize, Padma Shri Award
- Scientific career
- Fields: Neuroscience
- Workplaces: Indian Institute of Science, National Brain Research Centre, National Institute of Mental Health and Neurosciences, Centre for Brain Research
- Doctoral advisor: Chandrasekhara N

Vijayalakshmi Ravindranath (born 18 October 1953) is an Indian neuroscientist. She is currently a professor at the Centre for Neuroscience, Indian Institute of Science in Bangalore. She was the founder director of the National Brain Research Centre, Gurgaon (2000-9) and founder chair of the Centre for Neuroscience at Indian Institute of Science. Her main area of interest is the study of brain related disorders including neurodegenerative diseases such as Alzheimer's and Parkinson's. She serves as the founding director of the Centre for Brain Research in Bangalore.

== Education and career ==
Ravindranath earned her B.Sc. and M.Sc. degrees from Andhra University, received her Ph.D. in biochemistry in 1981 from Mysore University, and worked at the National Cancer Institute in the US as a postdoctoral fellow. She joined the National Institute of Mental Health and Neurosciences in Bangalore, where she studied the metabolizing capacity of the human brain, focusing especially on psychoactive drugs and environmental toxins. In 1999, she helped Department of Biotechnology of the Government of India to establish National Brain Research Centre to co-ordinate and network neuroscience research groups in India.

== Awards and recognitions ==
Ravindranath is an elected fellow of several Indian academies: Indian Academy of Sciences, National Academy of Sciences, Indian National Science Academy and National Academy of Medical Sciences, Indian Academy of Neurosciences and Third World Academy of Sciences.

- Shanti Swarup Bhatnagar Prize for Science and Technology for Medical Sciences in 1996
- KP Bhargava Medal of Indian National Science Academy
- Om Prakash Bhasin Award for Science & Technology in 2001
- J.C. Bose Fellowship (2006)
- S.S. Bhatnagar Award of Indian National Science Academy (2016)
- Padma Shri Award in 2010

== Publications ==
Ravindranath, V., & Sundarakumar, J. S. (2021). Changing demography and the challenge of dementia in India. In Nature Reviews Neurology (Vol. 17, Issue 12, pp. 747–758). Nature Research. https://doi.org/10.1038/s41582-021-00565-x
1. Ray, Ajit; Kambali, Maltesh; Ravindranath, Vijayalakshmi (2016). "Thiol Oxidation by Diamide Leads to Dopaminergic Degeneration and Parkinsonism Phenotype in Mice: A Model for Parkinson's Disease". Antioxidants & Redox Signaling. 25 (5): 252–267. doi:10.1089/ars.2015.6602. PMID 27121974.
2. Johnson, William M.; Golczak, Marcin; Choe, Kyonghwan; Curran, Pierce L.; Gorelenkova Miller, Olga; Yao, Chen; Wang, Wenzhang; Lin, Jiusheng; Milkovic, Nicole M.; Ray, Ajit; Ravindranath, Vijayalakshmi; Zhu, Xiongwei; Wilson, Mark A.; Wilson-Delfosse, Amy L.; Chen, Shu G.; Mieyal, John Joseph (2016). "Regulation of DJ-1 by glutaredoxin 1 in vivo – implications for Parkinson's disease". Biochemistry. 55 (32): 4519–32. doi:10.1021/acs.biochem.5b01132. PMC 4987251. PMID 26894491.
3. Ravindranath, Vijayalakshmi; Dang, Hoang-Minh; Goya, Rodolfo G.; Mansour, Hader; Nimgaonkar, Vishwajit L.; Russell, Vivienne Ann; Xin, Yu (2015). "Regional research priorities in brain and nervous system disorders". Nature. 527 (7578): S198–206. Bibcode:2015Natur.527S.198R. doi:10.1038/nature16036. hdl:11336/48799. PMID 26580328.
4. Ray, Ajit; Sehgal, Neha; Karunakaran, Smitha; Rangarajan, Govindan; Ravindranath, Vijayalakshmi (2015). "MPTP activates ASK1–p38 MAPK signaling pathway through TNF-dependent Trx1 oxidation in parkinsonism mouse model". Free Radical Biology and Medicine. 87: 312–25. doi:10.1016/j.freeradbiomed.2015.06.041. PMID 26164633.
5. Ahmad, Faraz; Nidadavolu, Prakash; Durgadoss, Lalitha; Ravindranath, Vijayalakshmi (2014). "Critical cysteines in Akt1 regulate its activity and proteasomal degradation: Implications for neurodegenerative diseases". Free Radical Biology and Medicine. 74: 118–28. doi:10.1016/j.freeradbiomed.2014.06.004. PMID 24933620.
6. Ravindranath, Vijayalakshmi (2014). "Occurrence, distribution and potential actions of CYP2D6 in the brain". pp. 102–116. doi:10.2217/fmeb2013.14.9. ISBN 978-1-78084-462-6. ;
7. Ravindranath, Vijayalakshmi; Strobel, Henry W (2013). "Cytochrome P450-mediated metabolism in brain: Functional roles and their implications". Expert Opinion on Drug Metabolism & Toxicology. 9 (5): 551–8. doi:10.1517/17425255.2013.759208. PMID 23330950. S2CID 12723035.
