= Starmind International =

Private software company based in Switzerland

Starmind
- Type: Incorporated Company
- Industry: Computer software
- Founded: Zurich, Switzerland (June 4, 2010)
- Headquarters: Zürich, Switzerland
- Key people: Marc Vontobel (Founder & CEO) Pascal Kaufmann (Founder) Andreas Meyer (President of Board)
- Website: https://starmind.com

Starmind is an artificial intelligence software company based in Zürich, Switzerland. The Starmind software builds custom knowledge networks within large organizations, to connect employees with information.

== Product and technology ==
The Starmind software was developed with the intention to provide employees answers from top experts within their company, on any subject. The Software uses self-learning algorithms to build company expertise networks.

These algorithms use neuroscientific principles, such as Hebbian Learning. Co-founder Pascal Kaufmann has stated his goal is to create machines which work like the human brain.

The software identifies experts within a network and connects them to employees in need of that expertise via a text based interface.

== History ==
Starmind was founded by Pascal Kaufmann and Marc Vontobel at the Artificial Intelligence Laboratory at the University of Zurich in 2010. The algorithm was developed using insights from artificial intelligence and neuroscientific research from the Swiss Federal Institute of Technology (ETH) in Zurich and is based on virtual neural tissue and self-learning neural networks studies.

The company was acquired in 2026 by Capacity, an AI support automation platform based in the United States.

== Offices ==
Starmind has offices in Switzerland, Germany and the United States of America. The company is headquartered in Küsnacht, Switzerland.

== See also ==
- Abionic
- ServiceHunter
