= Brain/MINDS =

Japanese brain research project

- Mission statement: "Studying the neural networks controlling higher brain functions in the Marmoset, to gain new insights into information processing and diseases of the Human brain"
- Commercial?: No
- Type of project: Scientific research
- Owner: Network of research institutes throughout Japan, with RIKΞN Center for Brain Science as central institute
- Country: Japan
- Established: 2014; 12 years ago
- Funding: MEXT in 2014, AMED as of 2015
- Website: brainminds.jp/en/

The Brain/MINDS (Brain Mapping by Integrated Neurotechnologies for Disease Studies) is a Japanese project sponsored by the Ministry of Education, Culture, Sports, Science, and Technology of Japan (MEXT) in 2014, then by the Japan Agency for Medical Research and Development (AMED) as of 2015. The project was launched in June 2014 for a 10-year duration.

The Brain/MINDS Project studies focuses on three areas:

1. The study of the brain of the common marmoset – a non-human primate. This is led by Hideyuki Okano of the RIKEN Center for Brain Science (formerly "RIKEN Brain Science Institute") and the Keio University School of Medicine.
2. Developing technologies for brain mapping; led by Atsushi Miyawaki, also of the RIKEN Center for Brain Science.
3. Human brain mapping. This is led by Kiyoto Kasai of the University of Tokyo's Graduate School of Medicines.
