= Jurgis Kunčinas =

Jurgis Kunčinas (13 January 1947 in Alytus, Lithuania – 13 December 2002) was a poet, novelist, translator and essayist. He has been described as the chronicler of Soviet bohemianism, who poeticized the individual's internal autonomy as an alternative to the absurdity of social life. His works, originally published in the Lithuanian language, have been translated into English, German, Russian, Estonian, Belarusian, Swedish, and Polish.

Kunčinas received the Lithuanian Writers Union' prize in 1994 for the novel Tūla, set largely in Vilnius's Užupis district. His 1996 compilation of essays, Laba diena, pone Enrike!, received an award from the city of Vilnius. The public library in his hometown Alytus has been renamed after him and holds a biennial literary festival in his memory.

== Selected bibliography ==
- Takas per girią (1977) (poetry)
- Atidėtas rugsėjis (1984) (poetry)
- Atgimimo kryžius (1990) (poetry)
- Namai be žiburių (1991) (poetry)
- Vaizdas į mėnulį (1989) (essays)
- Baltųjų sūrių naktis (1995) (essays)
- Laba diena, pone Enrike! (1996) (essays)
- Glisono kilpa (1991) (novel)
- Tūla (1993) (novel); translated into English as Tūla, Flossmoor, IL: Pica Pica Press, 2016. ISBN 978-0996630412
