= Human Brain Project =

Scientific research project

- Type of project: Scientific research
- Location: Geneva, Switzerland
- Owner: European Union
- Key people: Paweł Świeboda, Director General; Katrin Amunts, Scientific Research Director
- Established: 1 October 2013; 12 years ago
- Status: Ended 30 September 2023; 2 years ago
- Website: humanbrainproject.eu

The Human Brain Project (HBP) was a EU scientific research project that ran for ten years from 2013 to 2023, with a total budget of €1 billion. Using high-performance exascale supercomputers it built infrastructure that allowed researchers to advance knowledge in the fields of neuroscience, computing and brain-related medicine. Its successor was the European Brain Research Infrastructures (EBRAINS) project.

The Project, which started on 1 October 2013, was a European Commission Future and Emerging Technologies Flagship. The HBP was coordinated by the École Polytechnique Fédérale de Lausanne and was largely funded by the European Union. The project coordination office was in Geneva, Switzerland.

Peer-reviewed research finds that the public discussion forum (the Human Brain Project forum) was actively utilized and showed resilience during the COVID-19 pandemic. The HBP forum has been most actively utilized and useful for solving questions related to programming issues and questions close to HBP core areas.

== Strategic goals and organisation ==
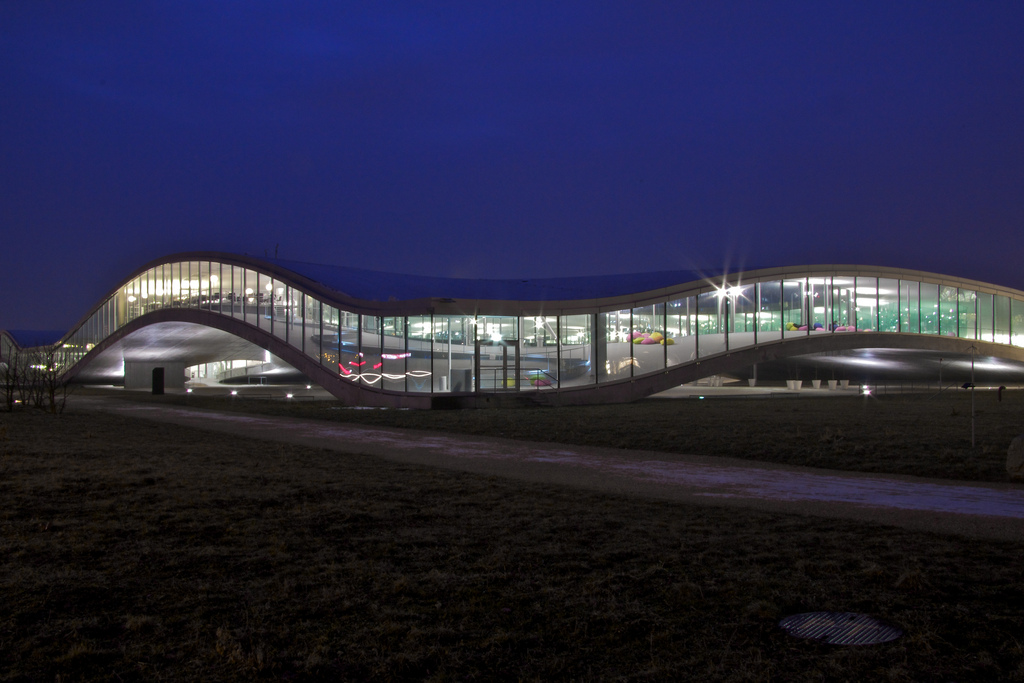
The 2013 HBP Summit–the inauguration of the Project–took place in the EPFL Learning Centre in October 2013. It brought together scientists from over 100 Partner Institutions.

Fundamental to the HBP approach is to investigate the brain on different spatial and temporal scales (i.e. from the molecular to the large networks underlying higher cognitive processes, and from milliseconds to years). To achieve this goal, the HBP relies on the collaboration of scientists from diverse disciplines, including neuroscience, philosophy and computer science, to take advantage of the loop of experimental data, modelling theories and simulations. The idea is that empirical results are used to develop theories, which then foster modelling and simulations which result in predictions that are in turn verified by empirical results.

The primary objective of the HBP is to create an ICT-based research infrastructure for brain research, cognitive neuroscience and brain-inspired computing, which can be used by researchers world-wide.

The Project is divided into 12 Subprojects. Six of these develop ICT-based platforms (Subprojects 5-10), which consist of prototype hardware, software, databases, and programming interfaces. These tools are available to researchers worldwide via the HBP Collaboratory. Four Subprojects gather data on empirical neuroscience and establish theoretical foundations (Subprojects 1–4) and one is responsible for ethics and society (Subproject 12). Subproject 11 coordinates the project.

- SP1 Mouse Brain Organisation: Understanding the structure of the mouse brain, and its electrical and chemical functions
- SP2 Human Brain Organisation: Understanding the structure of the human brain, and its electrical and chemical functions
- SP3 Systems and Cognitive Neuroscience: Understanding how the brain performs its systems-level and cognitive functional activities
- SP4 Theoretical Neuroscience: Deriving high-level mathematical models to synthesize conclusions from research data
- SP5 Neuroinformatics Platform: Gathering, organising and making available brain data
- SP6 Brain Simulation Platform: Developing data-driven reconstructions of brain tissue and simulation capabilities to explore these reconstructions
- SP7 High-performance Analytics and Computing Platform: Providing the ICT capability to map the brain in unprecedented detail, construct complex models, run large simulations, and analyse large volumes of data
- SP8 Medical Informatics Platform: Developing the infrastructure to share hospital and medical research data for the purpose of understanding disease clusters and their respective disease signatures
- SP9 Neuromorphic Computing Platform: Developing and applying brain-inspired computing technology
- SP10 Neurorobotics Platform: Developing virtual and real robots and environments for testing brain simulations
- SP11 Management and Coordination: General coordination of the project
- SP12 Ethics and Society: Exploring the ethical and societal impact of HBP's work

The HBP is coordinated by the École Polytechnique Fédérale de Lausanne and involves researchers from over 117 partner institutions in 19 countries across Europe. Notable Partner Institutions include the University of Heidelberg, Forschungszentrum Jülich, and the University Hospital of Lausanne.

The scientific direction is provided by representatives from each of the HBP's Subprojects, which form the Science and Infrastructure Board (SIB). Katrin Amunts from Forschungszentrum Jülich is the Chair of the SIB. Alois Knoll from TU Munich is Vice Chair of the SIB for software. The Directorate steers the daily work of the HBP – it is led by Andreas Mortensen from EPFL.

== Funding ==
The HBP is funded by the European Commission Directorate General for Communications Networks, Content and Technology (DG CONNECT) under the FP7 framework, an EU Research and Innovation funding programme. It was one of the two initial Future Emerging Technologies (FET) Flagship projects.

The project is split into five phases, each supplied with separate funding. The call for funding for the Project's initial two-and-a-half-year 'Ramp-Up Phase' of EUR 54 million closed in November 2013 and the results were announced in March 2014. Twenty-two projects from thirty-two organisations were selected for the initial funding of EUR 8.3 million. The Ramp-Up Phase ended on 31 March 2016. Funding is reassessed every two years using Specific Grant Agreements (SGA); the first of which began in April 2016 (ending in April 2018), and the second with a total EU funding of 88 Million Euro starting in April 2018 (ending in March 2020). The HBP's total costs are estimated at EUR 1.019 billion, of which EUR 500 million will be provided by the European Commission, EUR 500 million by national, public and private organisations, and EUR 19 million by the Core Project Ramp-Up Phase Partners.

== Obstacles ==
One of the Project's primary hurdles is the unsystematic nature of the information collected from previous brain research. Neurological research data varies by biological organisation schemes, species studied, and by developmental stages, making it difficult to collectively use the data to replicate the brain in a model that acts as a single system.

Other obstacles include engineering problems involving power consumption, memory, and storage. For example, detailed neuron representations are very computationally expensive, and whole brain simulation is at the leading edge of our computational capability.

== Implications ==
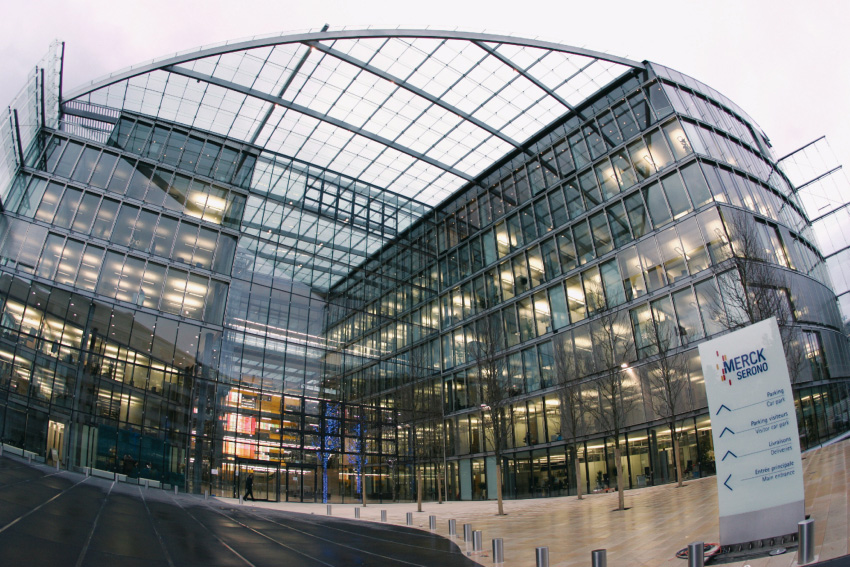
The Human Brain Project moved to Campus Biotech in 2014.

Technologies generated by the HBP and other similar projects offer several possibilities to other fields of research. For instance, a brain model can be used to investigate signatures of disease in the brain and the impact of certain drugs, enabling the development of better diagnosis and treatment methods. Ultimately, these technologies will likely lead to more advanced medical options available to patients at a lower cost.

In addition, detailed brain simulation requires significant computing power, leading to developments in supercomputing and energy-efficient, brain-inspired computing techniques. Computational developments can be extended into areas such as data mining, telecommunications, appliances, and other industrial uses.

The long-term ethical consequences of the Project are also considered. The Project follows a policy of Responsible Research and Innovation, and its Ethics Advisory Board is responsible for monitoring the use of human volunteers, animal subjects, and the data collected. Implications on European society, industry, and economy are investigated by the HBP Ethics and Society Programme's Foresight Lab.

== Criticism ==
An open letter was sent on 7 July 2015 to the European Commission by 154 European researchers (750 signatures as of 3 September 2014) complaining of the HBP's overly narrow approach, and threatening to boycott the project. Central to this controversy was an internal dispute about funding for cognitive scientists who study high level brain functions, such as thought and behaviour. However, the HBP stated that there is "no question that cognition and behaviour are vital to the HBP", explaining that cognitive neuroscience research was repositioned in the project to allow the core project to focus on building the platforms. In addition, the open letter called on the EC to "reallocate the funding currently allocated to the HBP core and partnering projects to broad neuroscience-directed funding to meet the original goals of the HBP—understanding brain function and its effect on society". In its response, the HBP said that "while neuroscience research generates a vast amount of valuable data, there is currently no technology for sharing, organising, analysing or integrating this information, beyond papers and even databases. The HBP will provide the critical missing layer to move towards a multi-level reconstruction and simulation of the brain". It added that "cognitive and behavioural neuroscience will become the most significant component of neuroscience in HBP over the course of the project. However, for this to happen the platforms have to be in place first".

Peter Dayan, director of computational neuroscience at University College London, argued that the goal of a large-scale simulation of the brain is radically premature, and Geoffrey Hinton said that "the real problem with that project is they have no clue how to get a large system like that to learn". Similar concerns as to the project's methodology were raised by Robert Epstein.

The HBP has said that its members share the uncertainty surrounding large-scale simulation, but that "reconstructing and simulating the human brain is a vision, a target; the benefits will come from the technology needed to get there. That technology, developed by the HBP, will benefit all of neuroscience as well as related fields".

In 2015 the project underwent a review process and the three-member executive committee, led by Henry Markram, was dissolved and replaced by a 22-member governing board.

According to a 2019 article, "In 2013, the European Commission awarded his initiative—the Human Brain Project (HBP)—a staggering 1 billion euro grant (worth about $1.42 billion at the time)...the people I contacted struggled to name a major contribution that the HBP has made in the past decade." Another article concluded that "Ultimately, the mega-project did create communities of scientists focused on some common goals, he says. "That's an enduring legacy.""

== Legacy ==
The European Brain Research Infrastructures (EBRAINS) is a research infrastructure created through HBP "that gathers an extensive range of data and tools for brain related research". EBRAINS consists of a set of infrastructure initiatives (such as brain atlases), tools and services (such as the sPyNNaker software suite for SpiNNaker hardware), and community projects. It is an international non-profit association headquartered in Brussels, Belgium, and a member of the European Open Science Cloud association.

== See also ==
- Blue Brain Project
- BRAIN Initiative, US initiative
- Brain/MINDS
- China Brain Project
- Decade of the Brain
- Decade of the Mind
- Human Connectome Project
- List of artificial intelligence projects
- SpiNNaker
- Brain atlas
