= Užupis =

Neighbourhood in Vilnius, Lithuania

Coordinates: 54°40′50″N 25°17′49″E

Republic of Užupis
- Unrecognized micronation
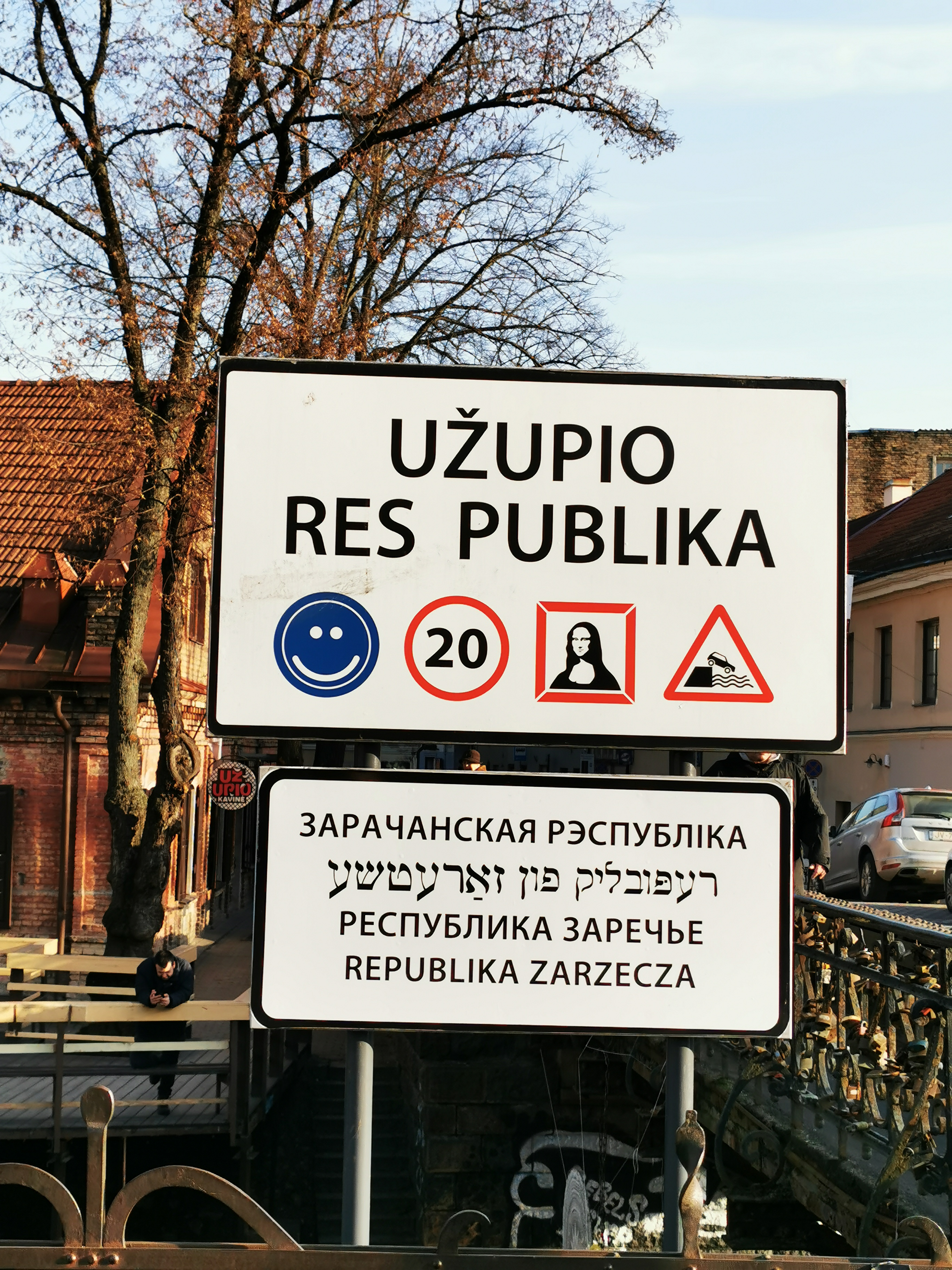
- Signs at the border of Užupis, written in five languages
- Claimed by: Residents of Užupis neighborhood
- Established: 1 April 1997
- Area claimed: 0.6 square kilometres (0.23 mi^{2})
- Location: Užupis neighborhood in Vilnius, Lithuania

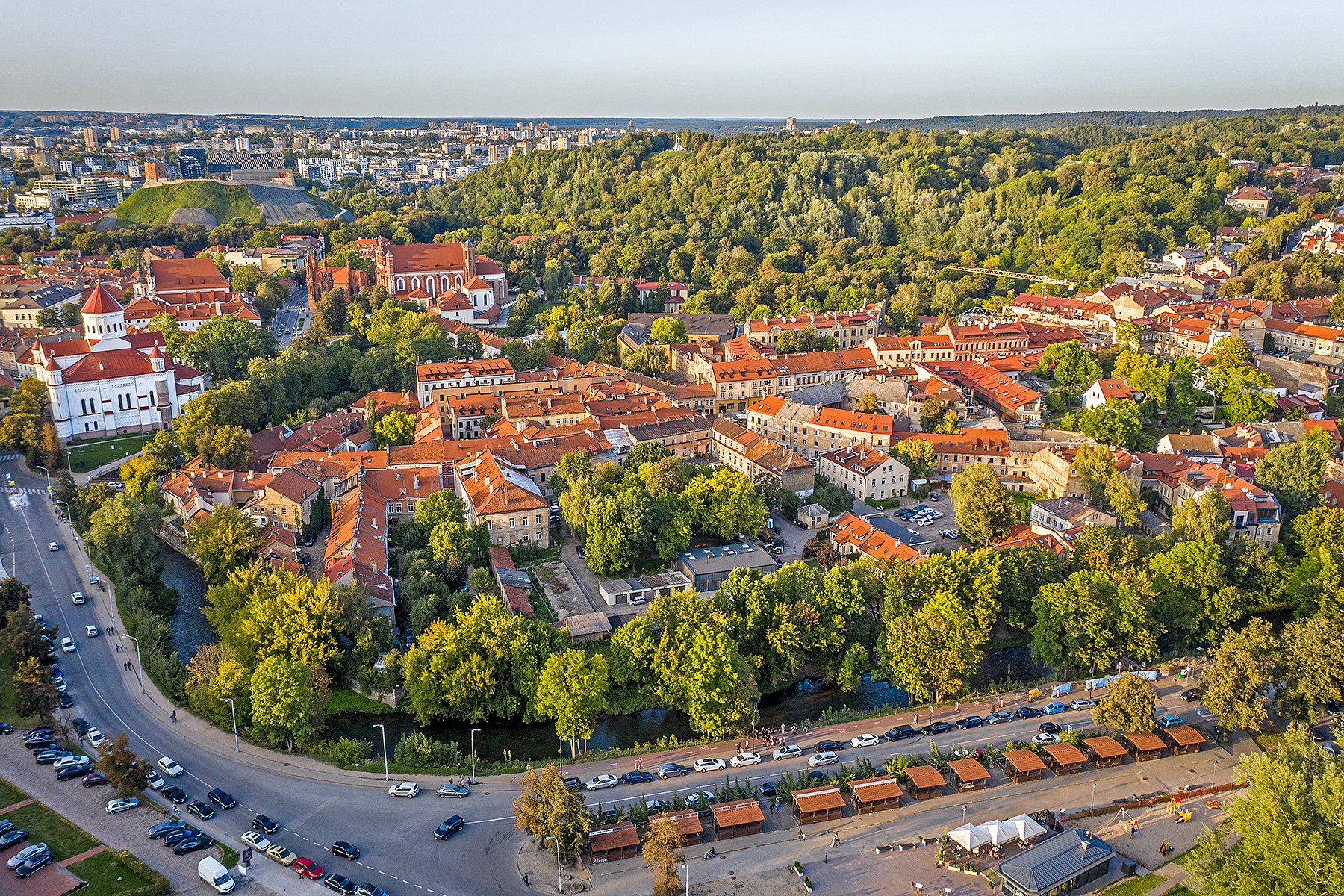
Užupis (2020)

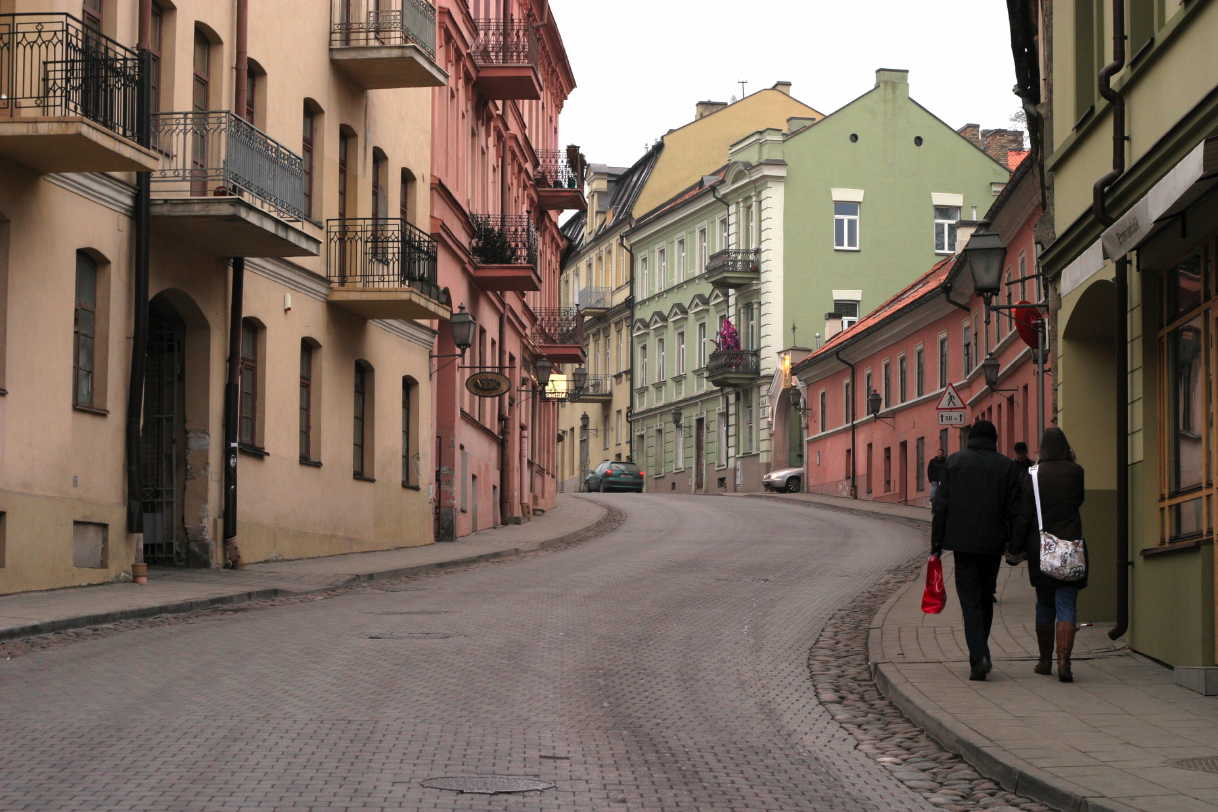
Užupis (2007)

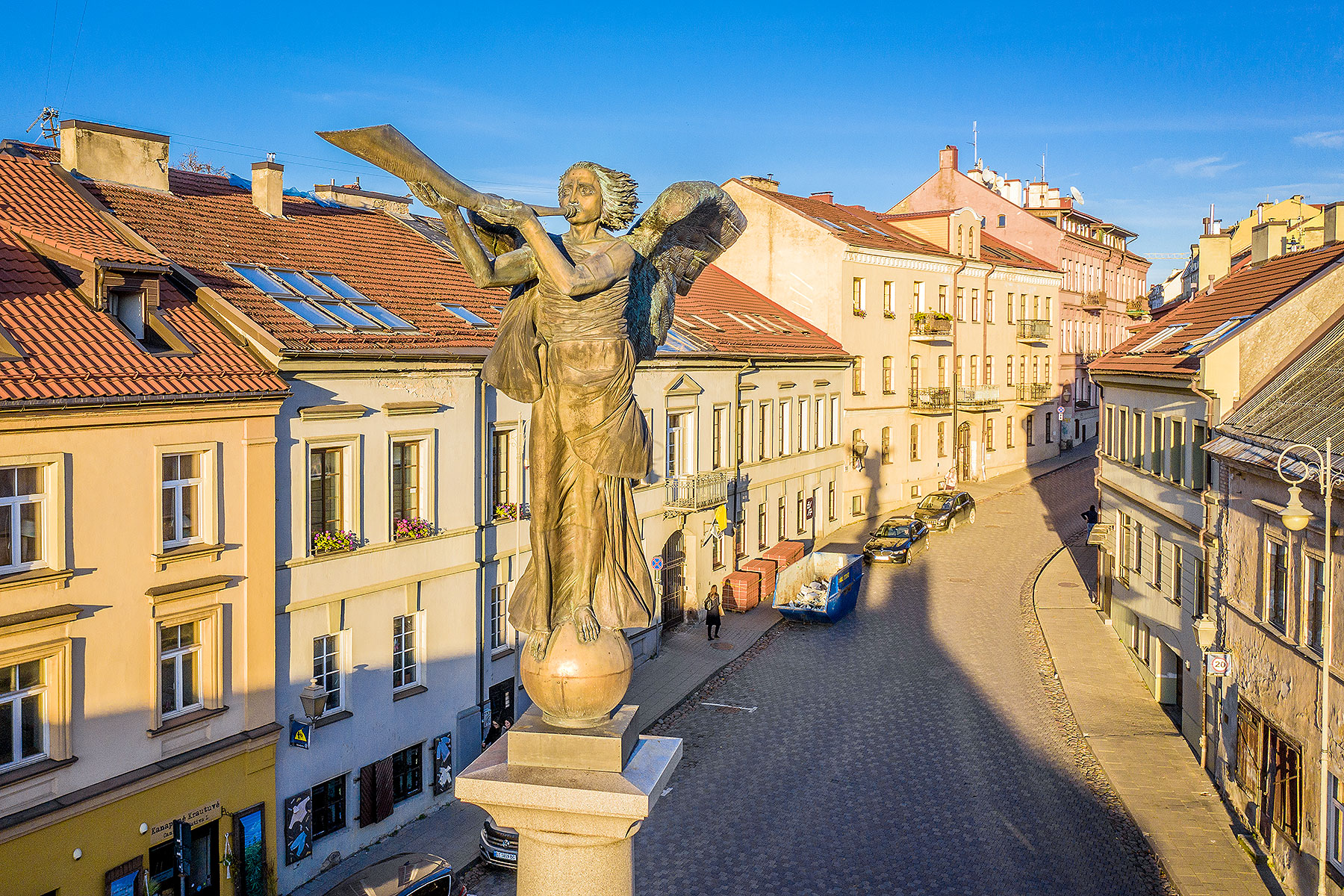
Angel of Užupis (2022)

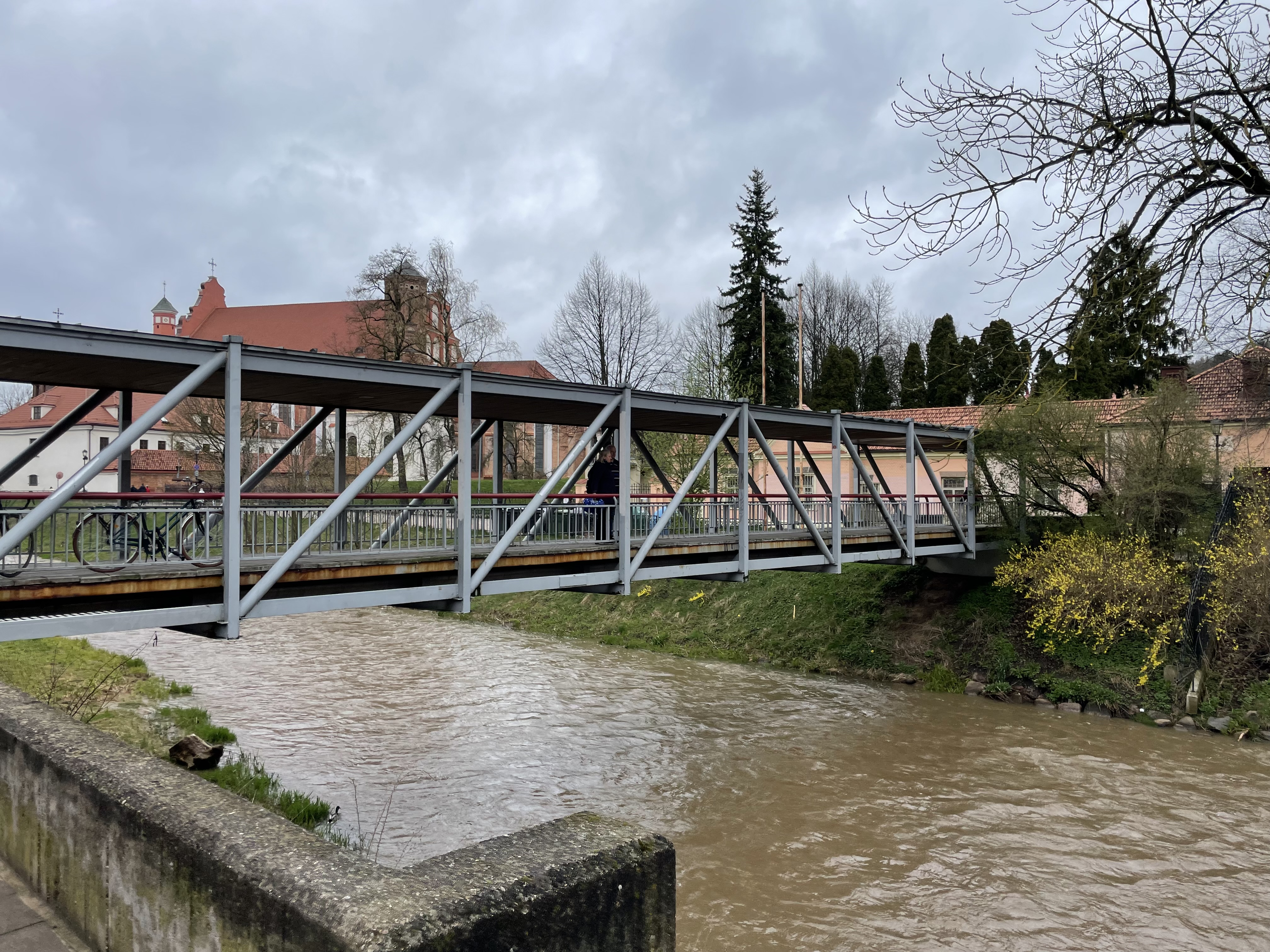
Fluxus Bridge (2024)

Užupis (Yiddish: זארעטשע, Belarusian: Зарэчча, Russian: Заречье, Polish: Zarzecze) is a neighborhood in Vilnius, the capital of Lithuania, largely located in Vilnius's old town, a UNESCO World Heritage Site. Užupis means "beyond the river" or "the other side of the river" in the Lithuanian language and refers to the Vilnia River; the name Vilnius was derived from the Vilnia. The district has been popular with artists for some time, and has been compared to Montmartre in Paris and to Freetown Christiania in Copenhagen, due to its bohemian and laissez-faire atmosphere. On April 1, 1997, the district declared itself an independent republic (the Republic of Užupis), with its own constitution.

== Geography ==
Užupis is quite small and isolated, being only about 60 ha (148 acres) in size; it has around 7,000 inhabitants, nearly 1,000 of which are artists. On one side it is separated from the Old Town by the Vilnia River, on the second there are steep hills, and on the third side, it borders on an industrial area built under Soviet rule. The first bridges across the river were built in the 16th century, when the district's inhabitants were mostly Jewish.

== History ==
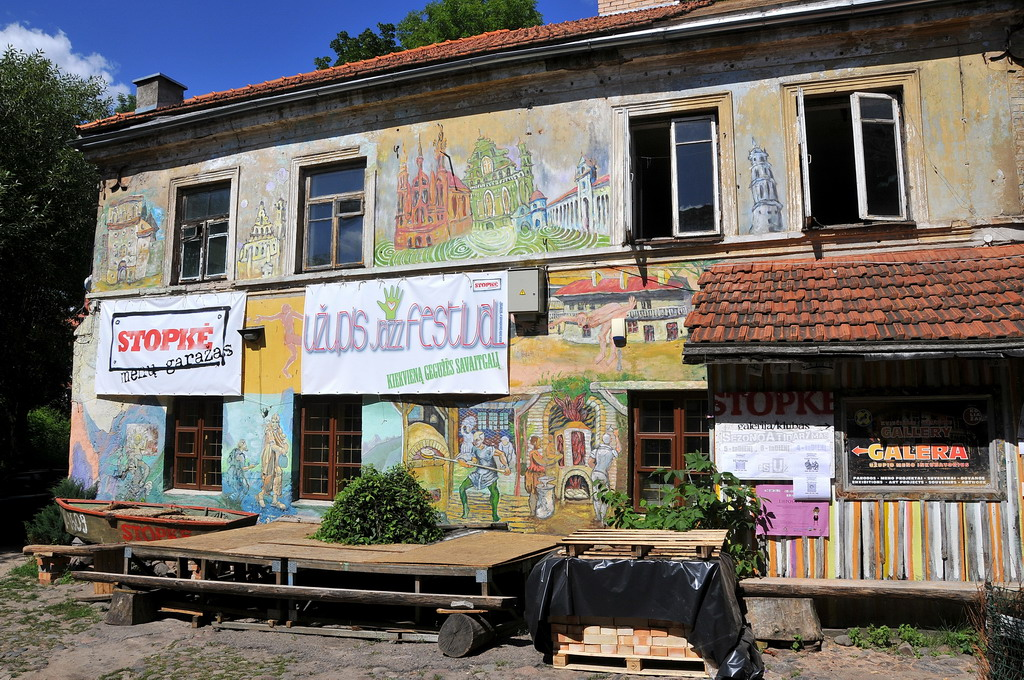
Street art on one of Užupis' buildings (2011)

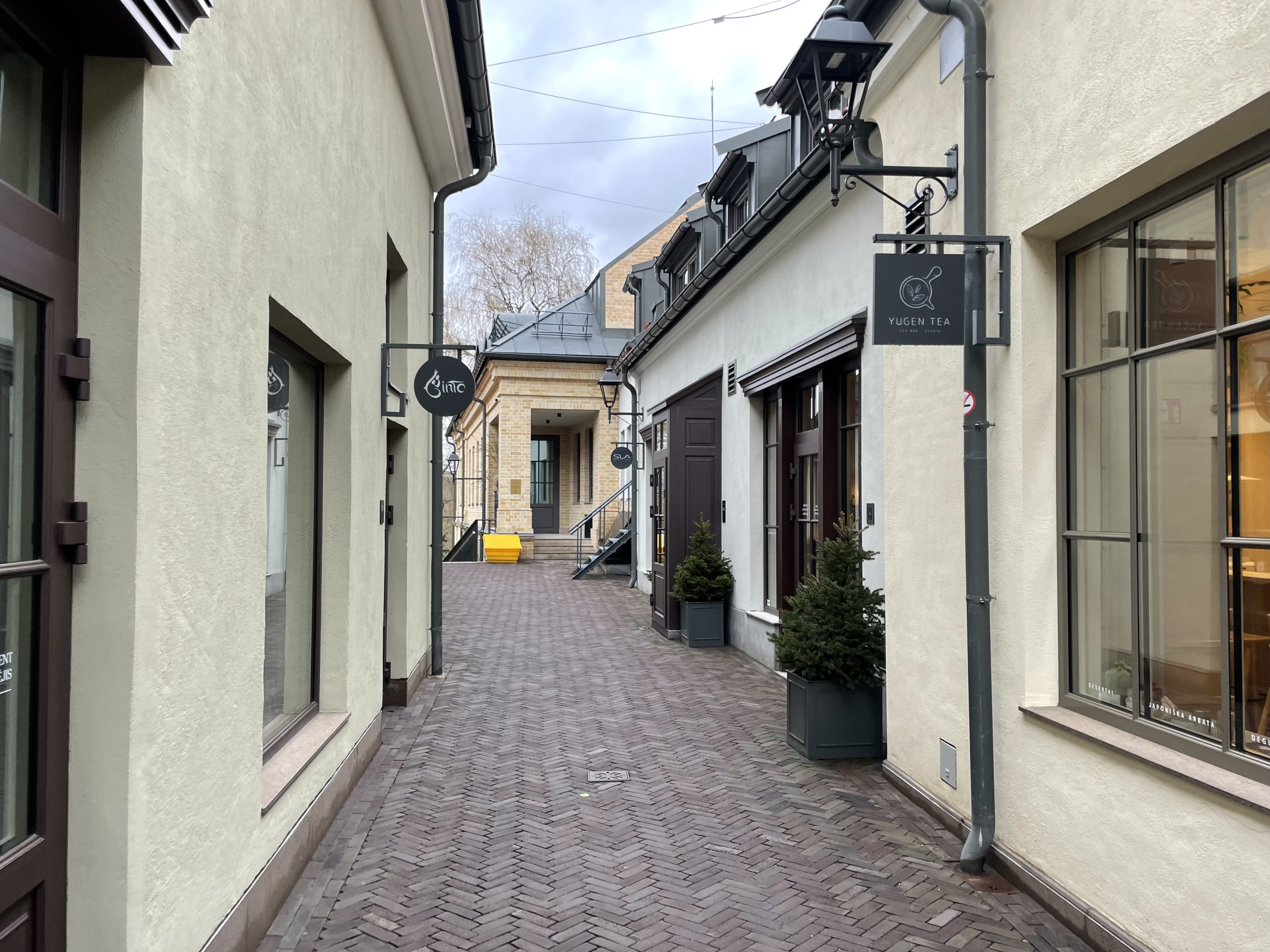
Malūnų street (2024)

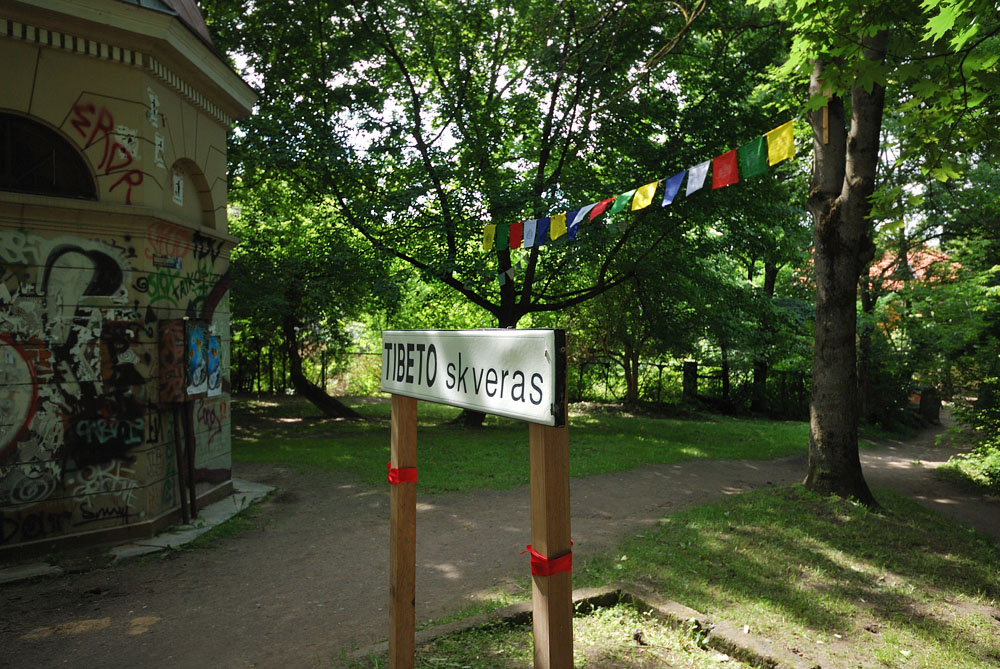
Tibet Square in Užupis

The district contains the Bernardine Cemetery, one of the oldest cemeteries in the city. Most of the district's Jewish population were killed during the Holocaust, and later the old Jewish Cemetery uphill would be destroyed by the Soviets. The houses left abandoned were later occupied by marginal elements of society, mainly the homeless, prostitutes and squatters. Until Lithuania's declaration of independence in 1990, it was one of the most neglected areas in the city, containing many run-down houses, many without utilities. The district has been a common haunt of artists and bohemians since Soviet times, and even today many young artists are squatting in abandoned buildings near the Vilnia River.

== The Republic of Užupis ==
The Republic has granted honorary citizenship to several notable individuals, including the 14th Dalai Lama, who first visited the Republic in 2013. He later returned in 2018 to plant a tree in the Republic's "Tibet Square" to mark 100 years since the Council of Lithuania proclaimed the restoration of an independent state of Lithuania.

Artūras Zuokas, a former mayor of Vilnius, lives in Užupis. Užupis does not house internet-cafes, markets, shopping malls, or governmental institutions (except Užupian), and there is no embassy to Lithuania.

It is unclear whether the statehood of the Republic, recognised by no government, is intended to be serious, tongue-in-cheek, or a combination of both. The decision to place Užupis Day on April 1 (April Fools' Day) may not be coincidental, emphasising the importance of humor over "serious" political decisions. The flag of the Republic features the palm of a hand on a white background. The colour of the palm emblem changes seasonally, in the sequence blue (Winter), green (Spring), yellow (Summer), and red (Autumn).

=== Ambassadors of Užupis ===
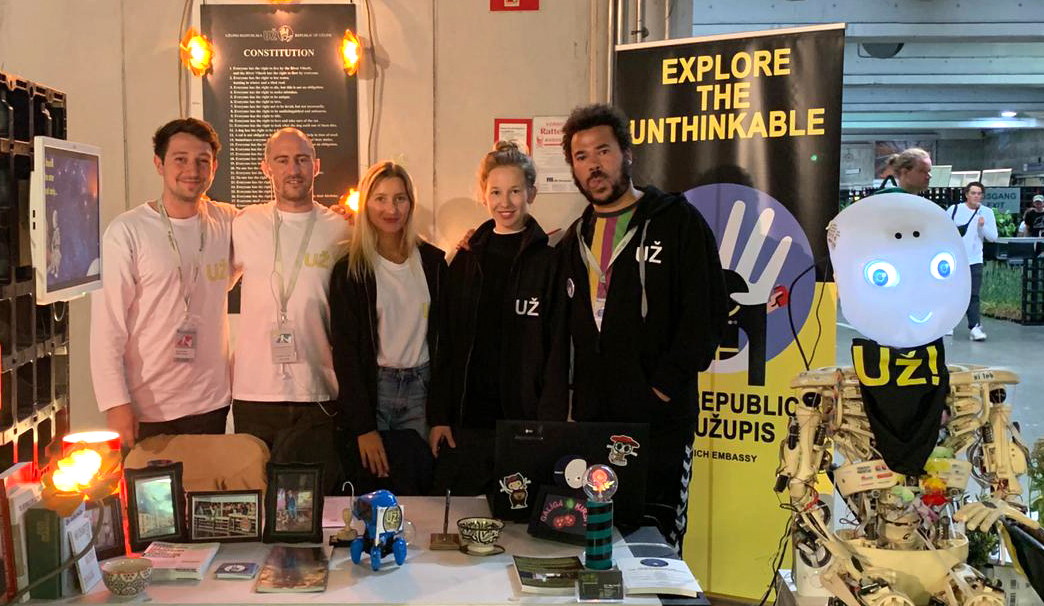
Installation of the Embassy of the Republic of Užupis to Munich including humanoid consul Roboy at Ars Electronica Festival in Linz (AT) in 2019.

The Užupis Ministry of Foreign Affairs has appointed more than 500 ambassadors worldwide. The ambassadors have the task to build bridges between people. Some ambassadors represent the republic and its constitution in a certain state or geographic region while others share the republic's spirit in various realms of life like the ambassador among humming birds, the ambassador of knowledge for humanity or the ambassador for whistling in the streets. The Embassy of the Republic of Užupis to Munich builds bridges between arts and AI technology to make artificial intelligence more ethical and more accessible to society. Well-known ambassadors include the experimental filmmaker Jonas Mekas, the art critic Konstyantyn Doroshenko, and the designer Dr. Nelly Ben Hayoun. Every year the ambassadors meet for their world conference in Užupis on the day before national day celebrations on April 1. Representatives of the Republic of Užupis have met with the President and Foreign Minister of Liberland to discuss mutual recognition.

=== Constitution of Užupis ===
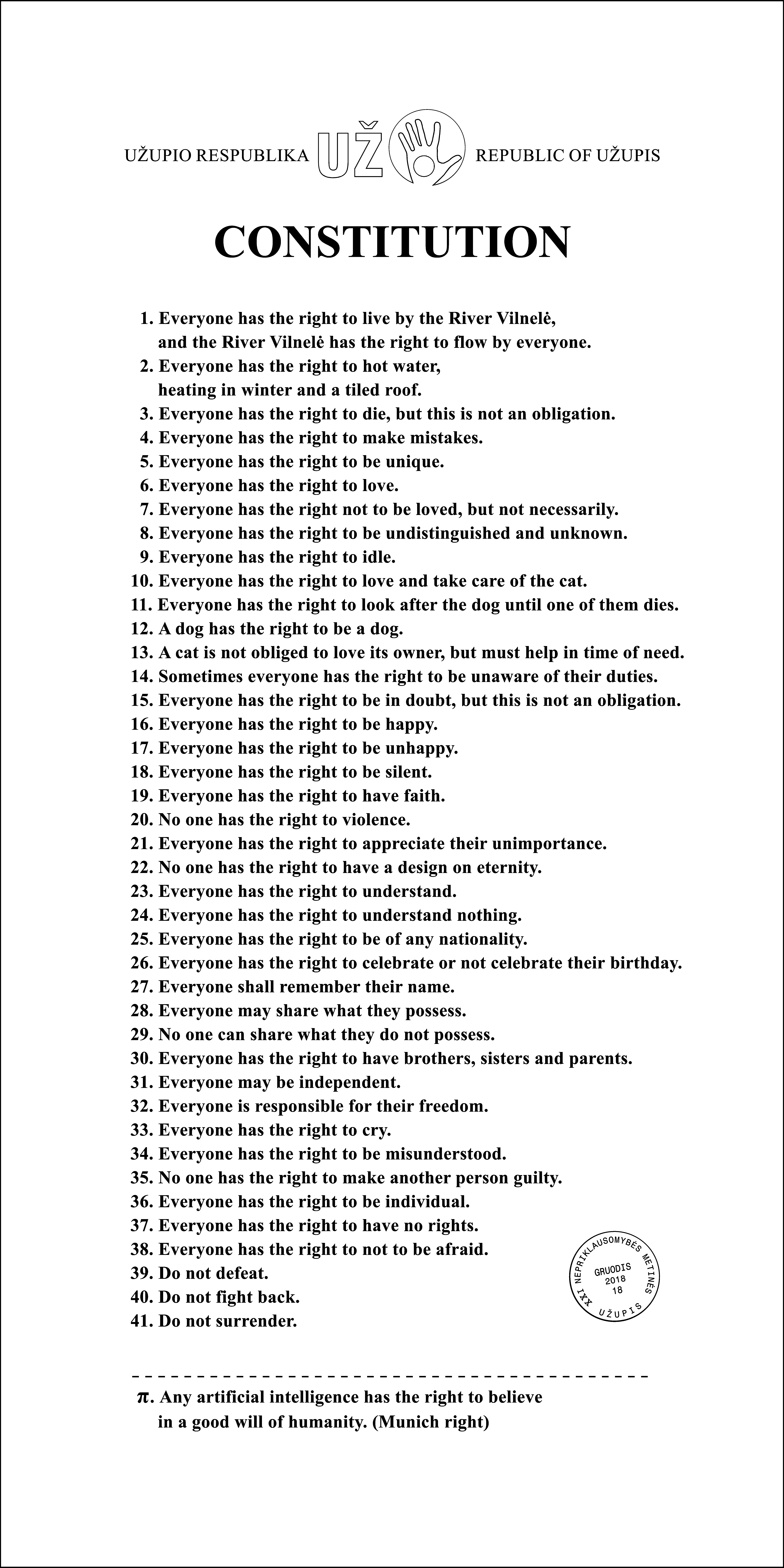
The Munich version of the constitution of the Republic of Užupis including an additional article about artificial intelligence (no. π).

Copies of the 38 articles of the Republic's constitution and 3 mottos - "Don't Fight", "Don't Win", "Don't Surrender" - in 23 languages, can be found affixed to a wall in Paupio street in the area. Sanskrit and Hindi versions of the constitution were added on 25 May 2017. Some of these articles would be unremarkable in a constitution; for instance, Article 5 simply reads "Man has the right to individuality.". Others are more idiosyncratic; a typical example can be found in Article 1 ("People have the right to live by the River Vilnelė, while the River Vilnelė has the right to flow past people."), 12 ("A dog has the right to be a dog.") and 37 ("People have the right to have no rights."), which can be seen as unusual compared to fundamental rights set out by the EU.

There are a number of paired articles, such as Articles 16 ("People have the right to be happy.") and 17 ("People have the right to be unhappy.") which declare people's right to either do or not do something, according to their desire. Minister of Foreign Affairs Thomas Chepaitis, Ambassador H. E. Max Haarich, AI-Expert Alex Waldmann and humanoid Roboy formulated an additional article for the Munich Embassy: "Any artificial intelligence has the right to believe in a good will of humanity." This makes the Užupian constitution the world's first constitution to mention artificial intelligence. In September 2018 the constitution was blessed by Pope Francis during his visit to Vilnius.

== Angel of Užupis ==
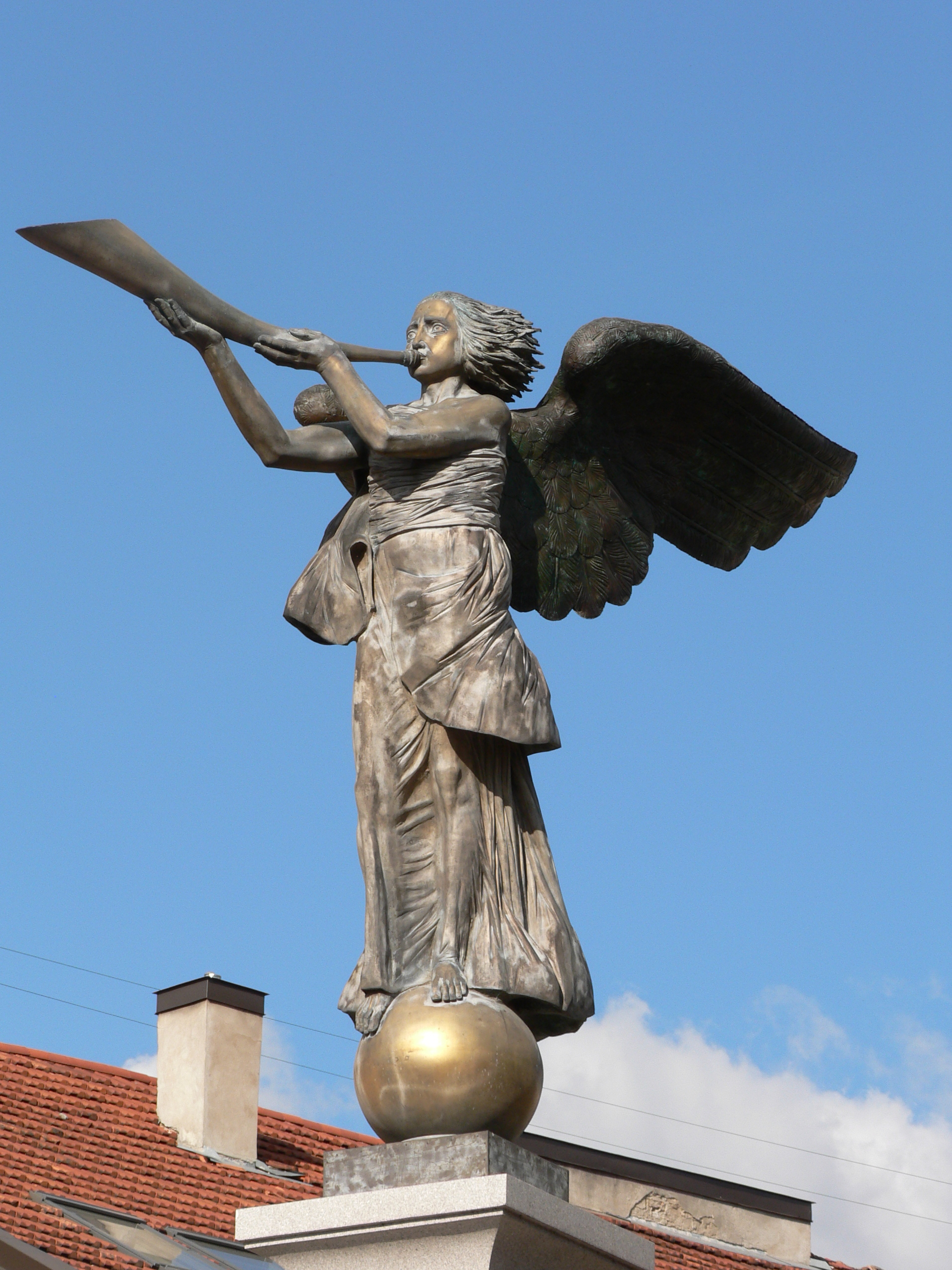
The Angel of Užupis

On April 1, 2002, a statue of an angel blowing a trumpet was unveiled in the main square. The idea was developed from a desire to erect an angel in memory of animator and caricaturist Zenonas Šteinys. It became a symbol of the revival of Užupis. The funds were raised by selling miniature copies of the sculpture. The sculptor, Romas Vilčiauskas, is also the creator of the Užupis Mermaid.

Previously, a temporary sculpture of an egg stood in its place. After being replaced by the larger statue of Gabriel, the egg was sold at an auction for 10,200 litas and now stands on Pylimo street.

== Notable residents ==
Notable people who have resided in Užupis include:

- Felix Dzerzhinsky, also known as Iron Felix— Soviet Bolshevik revolutionary and secret police founder
- The painter and composer Mikalojus Konstantinas Čiurlionis
- Polish romantic-comic poet Konstanty Ildefons Gałczyński lived in Užupis in 1934-36
- Jurgis Kunčinas, author of 2 novels about Užupis, and translator from German
- Artūras Zuokas, former Vilnius mayor

== In creative works ==
The Republic of Užupis, a 2009 novel by the South Korean author Hailji, chronicles the journey of an Asian man named Hal visiting Užupis to inter the ashes of his father, believing the "Republic" to be his ancestral homeland.

Užupis was the topic of a 2015 piece of music by Matt Howden's The Mighty Sieben, featuring the three mottos, "Don't Fight", "Don't Win", "Don't Surrender". The track was written in celebration of, and first performed at, the Mėnuo Juodaragis Festival held in Lithuania.
