= Brain technology =

Neuroscience-based adaptive systems

Brain technology, or self-learning know-how systems, defines a technology that employs latest findings in neuroscience. [see also neuro implants] The term was first introduced by the Artificial Intelligence Laboratory in Zurich, Switzerland, in the context of the Roboy project. Brain Technology can be employed in robots, know-how management systems and any other application with self-learning capabilities. In particular, Brain Technology applications allow the visualization of the underlying learning architecture often coined as "know-how maps".

== Research and applications ==
The first demonstrations of BC in humans and animals took place in the 1960s when Grey Walter demonstrated use of non-invasively recorded encephalogram (EEG) signals from a human subject to control a slide projector (Graimann et al., 2010).

Soon after Jacques J. Vidal coined the term brain–computer interface (BCI) in 1971, the Defense Advanced Research Projects Agency (DARPA) first starting funding brain–computer interface research and has since funded several brain–computer interface projects. That market is expected to reach a value of $1.72 billion by 2022. Brain–computer interfaces record brain activity, transmit the information out of the body, signal-process the data via algorithms, and convert them into command control signals.

In 2012, a landmark study in Nature, led by pioneer Leigh Hochberg, MD, PhD, demonstrated that two people with tetraplegia were able to control robotic arms through thought when connected to the BrainGate neural interface system. The two participants were able to reach for and grasp objects in three-dimensional space, and one participant used the system to serve herself coffee for the first time since becoming paralyzed nearly 15 years prior.

And in October 2020, two patients were able to wirelessly control an operating system to text, email, shop and bank using direct thought through the Stentrode brain computer interface (Journal of NeuroInterventional Surgery) in a study led by Thomas Oxley. This was the first time a brain–computer interface was implanted via the patient's blood vessels, eliminating the need for open brain surgery.
