= Abionic =

Swiss medical technology company

Abionic SA
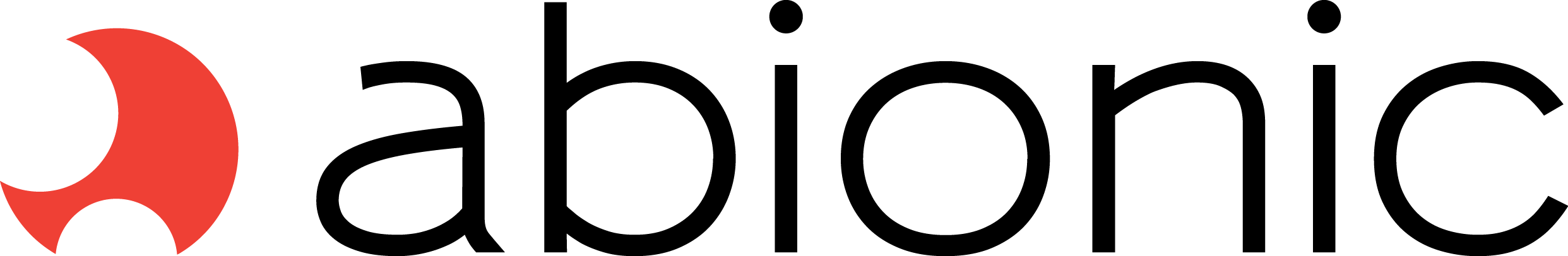
- Type: Private
- Industry: Diagnostic in vitro, ultra-rapid
- Founded: 2010 in Lausanne, Switzerland
- Founders: Nicolas Durand, Iwan Märki
- Headquarters: Epalinges, Switzerland
- Products: abioSCOPE, IVD CAPSULE
- Number of employees: 60
- Subsidiaries: Abionic USA, Inc. (U.S,), Abionic HK Ltd 愛必尼克有限公司 (Hong Kong)
- Website: www.abionic.com

Abionic SA is a company specializing in the development of ultra-rapid in vitro diagnostic tests, based in Lausanne, Switzerland.

Abionic has developed the abioSCOPE, a point-of-care diagnostic platform using its patented nanofluidic technology. The abioSCOPE is implemented in intensive care units and emergency departments to enable early identification of sepsis using a proprietary biomarker, Pancreatic Stone Protein (PSP).

The abioSCOPE is also used in primary care for screening for the iron deficiency, respiratory allergies, and more recently for COVID-19 screening with an antigenic saliva and nasopharyngeal test.

== History ==
Abionic was founded in 2010 at the Swiss Federal Institute of Technology in Lausanne (EPFL, École Polytechnique Fédérale de Lausanne) by Dr Nicolas Durand and Dr Iwan Märki.

In 2012, the company raised CHF 3.5 million in Series A funding. In 2014, Abiotic closed a CHF 8.2 million Series B funding round.

Abionic’s first allergy test was launched in May 2015.

The company received CE marks for the IVD CAPSULE PSP test for early sepsis diagnosis and the IVD CAPSULE Ferritin test in 2017. In the United States, Abiotic received FDA Approval for its first allergy panel test.

In 2018, the company closed a Series C fundraising round totaling CHF 20 million. The company launched a sepsis impact study in April 2019. It took place in 14 ICUs in 4 EU countries, for the use of the IVD CAPSULE PSP test on the abioSCOPE in the ICUs. Patient trials in the United States were launched in 2020 to validate the results of the European trial.

A CE mark for the abioSCOPE 2.0 was approved in 2019. Two years later, Abionic received a CE mark for the IVD CAPSULE COVID-19 Antigen test.

In 2024, the FDA issued 510(k) clearance for the pancreatic stone protein (PSP) sepsis test.

== Products ==
Abionic's solution is composed of the abioSCOPE, an in vitro diagnostic device and the consumable called the IVD CAPSULE, which is a single-use and analyte-specific tests. Test principle :

The test is based on mixing the patient's sample (whole blood, capillary, serum, saliva or nasopharyngeal sample) with a reagent containing fluorescent markers. The solution is then deposited on the capsule and enters nanochannels by capillary action. The volume-to-surface ratio then forces the molecules to interact immediately together, limiting their travel distance and reducing the incubation time to a few minutes. The concentration of the molecule of interest is then proportional to the intensity of the fluorescent signal measured by the abioSCOPE.

The different diagnostic tests developed by Abionic

- The IVD CAPSULE PSP is a quantitative serological test providing results within five minutes for the early detection of sepsis. PSP concentration increases rapidly and up to 72 hours before the onset of clinical symptoms. Its availability at the patient's bedside provides an additional tool to assist healthcare professionals in the management of antibiotic treatment and helps to limit the development of bacterial resistance, which is a major public health issue.

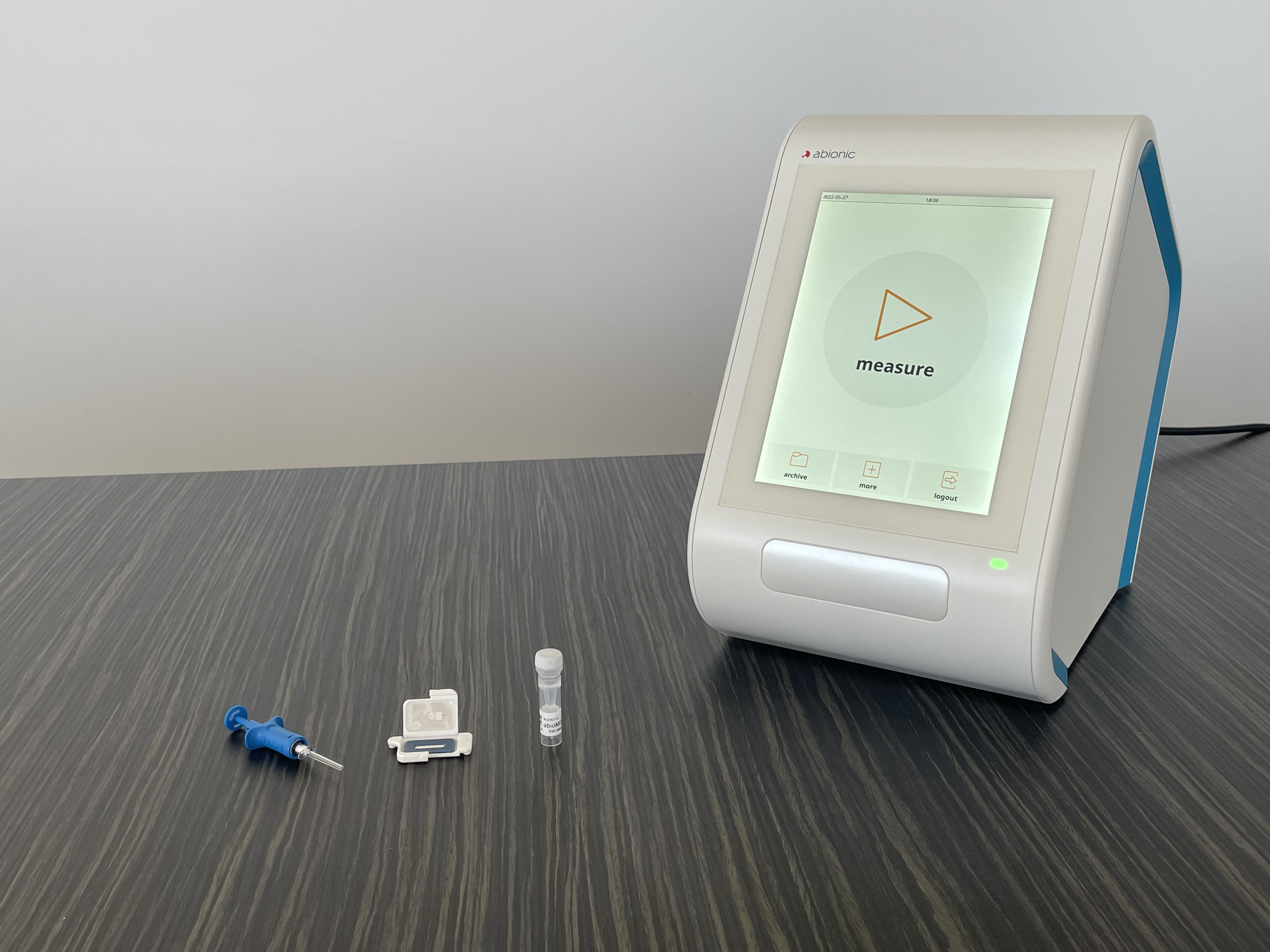
The abioSCOPE and the IVD CAPSULE PSP

- The IVD CAPSULE Ferritin is a quantitative serological test providing results within 5 minutes from a 50 μL sample of capillary blood. It is intended to be used by healthcare professionals to identify iron deficiencies, affecting mainly pregnant women, people with chronic diseases (heart failure, kidney disease, etc.), bleeding (ulcers) and inability to absorb iron.

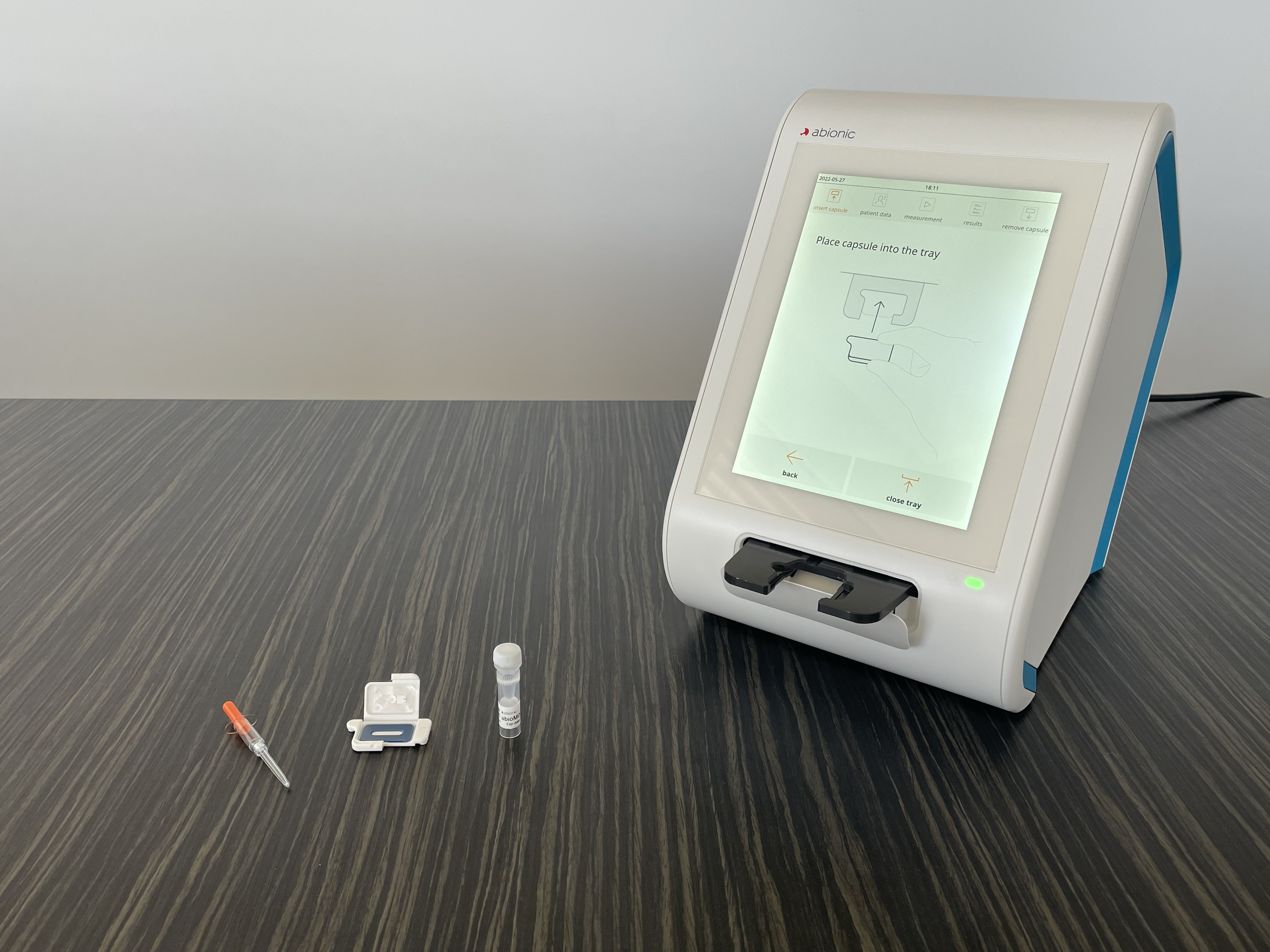
The abioSCOPE and the IVD CAPSULE Ferritin

- The IVD CAPSULE COVID-19 is a qualitative test performed with a saliva or nasopharyngeal sample and which provides a result within 2 minutes. It identifies the presence of the SARS-CoV-2 to identify contagious individuals and reduce virus spread.

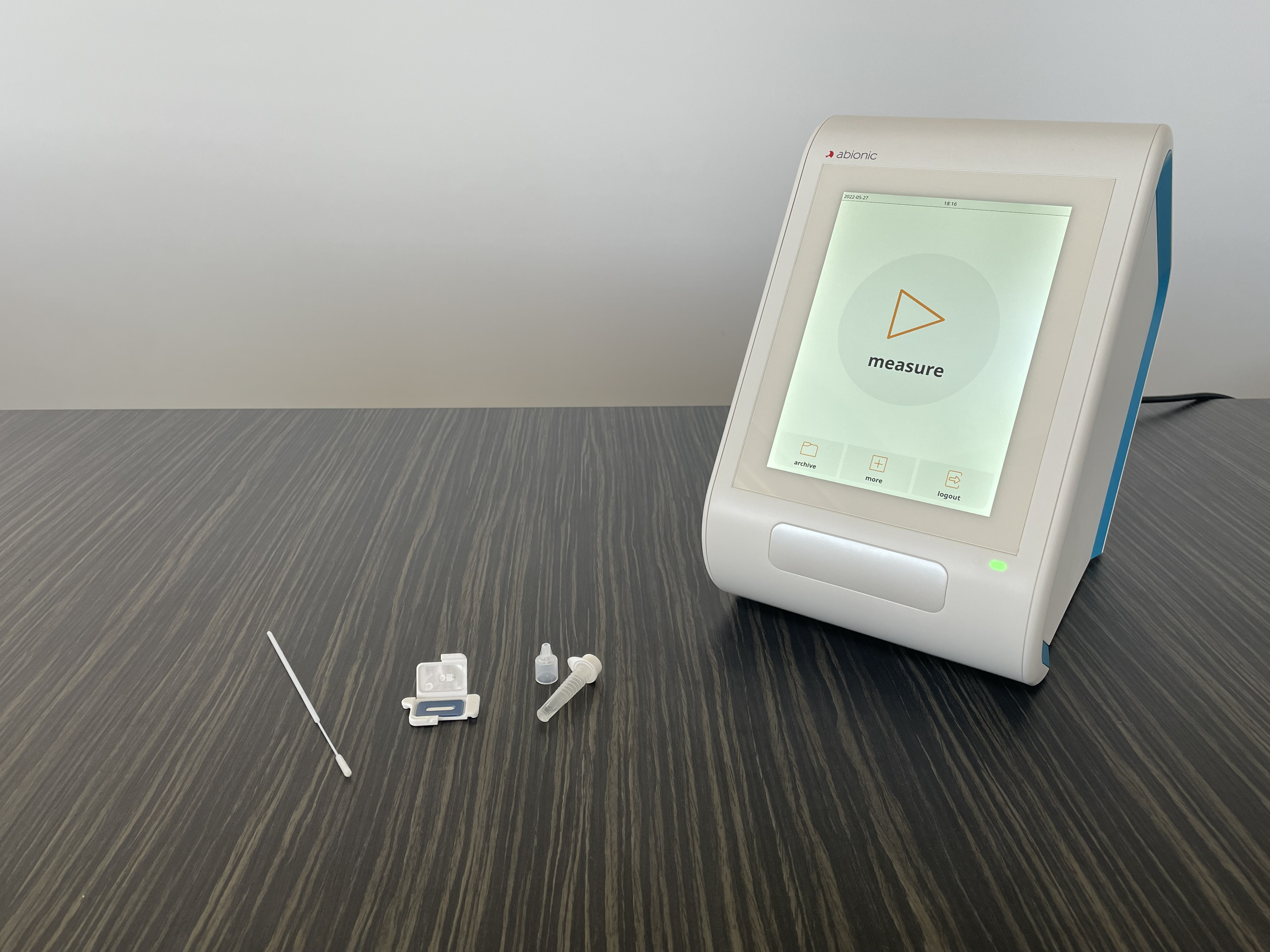
The abioSCOPE and the IVD CAPSULE COVID-19

- The IVD CAPSULE Aeroallergens is a semi-quantitative serological test at the point-of-care. It provides results within 12 minutes from a 50 μl sample of capillary blood. It is composed of 7 key allergens (IgE) to help diagnose allergic asthma: Dog (Can f 1), cat (Fed d 1), dust mites (Der p 1 + Der p 2), Alternaria Alternata (Alt a 1) and timothy grass (Phl p 1 + Phl p 5).

Other tests are under development: D-Dimer, CRP, PCT.

== Recognition and awards ==
| Year | Name of competition | Rank | Location |
|---|---|---|---|
| 2010 | PERL (Prix Entreprendre Région Lausanne) | 1st | Lausanne |
| 2010 | DebioPharm Award for Life sciences | 1st | Switzerland |
| 2010 | KPMG Inspiration | winner | Switzerland |
| 2010 | Venture Kick | winner of all 3 stages | Switzerland |
| 2011 | DeVigier | winner | Switzerland |
| 2012 | European Academic Enterprise Awards 2012 | 2nd | Europe |
| 2012 | Venture (Phase 2 Business Plan) | 6th | Switzerland |
| 2012 | Red Herring top 100 best European Startups | winner | Europe |
| 2013 | Swiss Excellence Product Award | winner | Switzerland |
| 2013 | Best Elevator Pitch Award | winner | Luxembourg |
| 2016 | Swiss Economic Forum | finalist | Switzerland |
| 2017 | Finance Monthly Game Changers Awards | winner | Switzerland |
| 2018 | EY Entrepreneur of the Year 2018 | finalist | Switzerland |
| 2018 | Swiss Venture Club Award 2018 | Finalist | Switzerland |
