= Alois Christian Knoll =

German roboticist

Alois C. Knoll
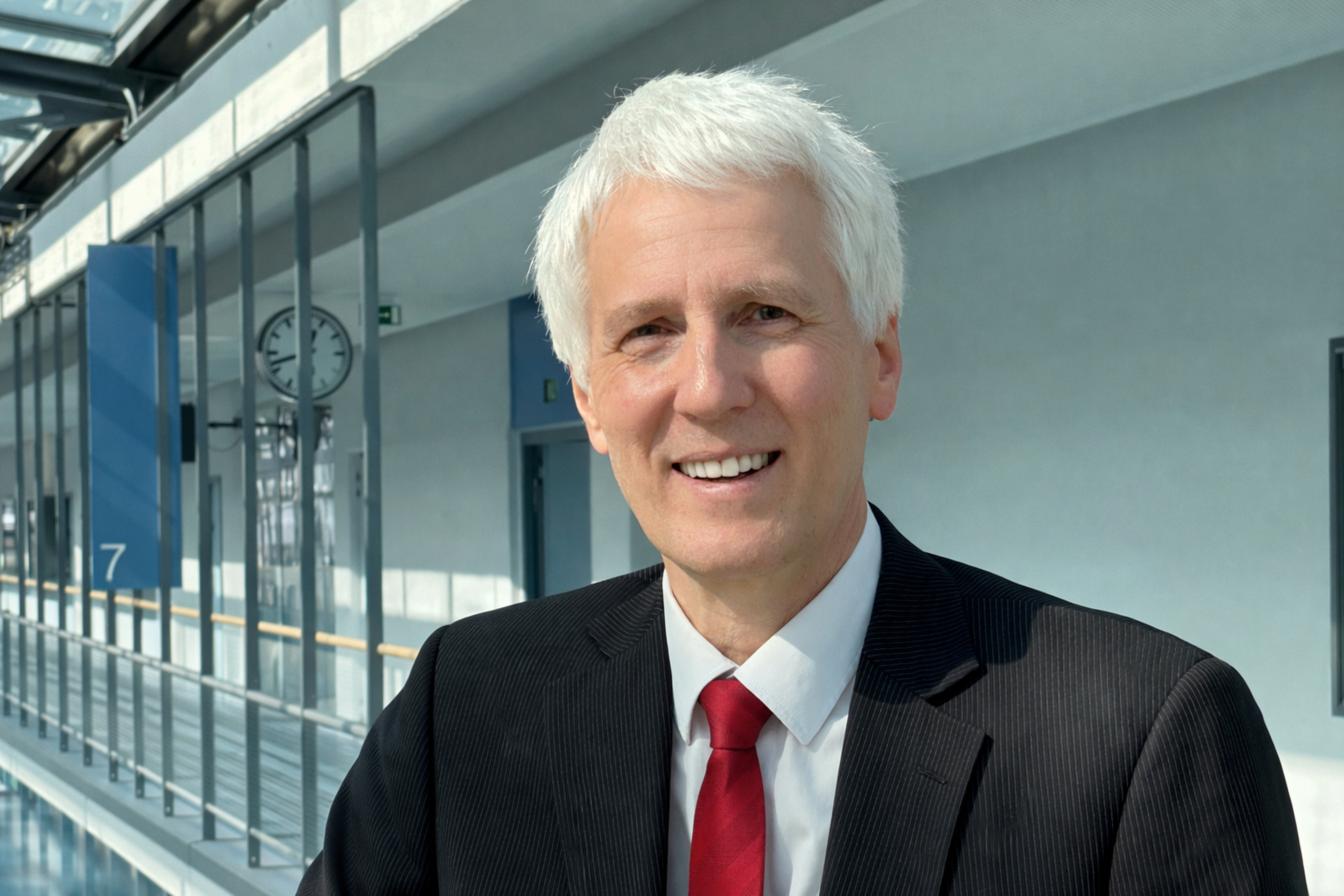
- Born: 19 March 1961 (age 65); Stuttgart, Germany
- Education: University of Stuttgart; Technische Universität Berlin; Bielefeld University
- Scientific career
- Fields: Robotics, AI
- Workplaces: Technical University of Munich

Alois Christian Knoll (born 19 March 1961 in Stuttgart) is a German computer scientist and professor at the TUM School of Computation, Information and Technology (formerly TUM Department of Informatics) at the Technical University of Munich (TUM), where he heads the Chair of Robotics, Artificial Intelligence and Embedded Systems. He is a member of the German Academy of Science and Engineering (acatech) and a Life Fellow of the IEEE.

== Biography ==
Alois C. Knoll received his diploma in electrical engineering/communications engineering from the University of Stuttgart in 1985. In 1988, he received his doctorate (summa cum laude) from Technische Universität Berlin. From 1985 to 1993 he was a member of “Department 20” (Computer Science) at the TU Berlin and received his habilitation in computer science in 1993.

He was appointed full professor at Bielefeld University in 1993, where he was director of the Computer Engineering Group (chair) until 2001. Between 2001 and 2004, he was a group leader and a member of the steering committee of the Fraunhofer Institute for Autonomous Intelligent Systems FhG-AIS. There, he was also head of the research group for robots and robot kits for educational purposes. It was from this group that the “Roberta” programme was launched in 2002, originally intended to encourage more girls to pursue robotics. In this group, the forerunners of the “Robotino” robot were conceived, which was first built and launched in 2006 and has been continuously developed by Festo-Didactic ever since.

Since 2001, he has been a professor at the Department of Computer Science at the Technical University of Munich, which merged into the TUM School of Computation, Information and Technology (CIT) in October 2022.

In 2009, he co-founded fortiss, the State Research Institute of the Free State of Bavaria for Software-Intensive Systems, and was one of its three scientific directors until 2018. From 2011 to 2021, he was Program Principal Investigator at TUMCREATE in Singapore and head of the Area Interlinking Design Analysis group. Between 2017 and 2021, he was visiting professor at the School of Computer Science and Engineering at Nanyang Technological University in Singapore.

Between 2007 and 2009, he was a member of the EU's highest IT advisory body, the ISTAG Information Society Technologies Advisory Group, and was involved in the design of the EU flagship projects within the EU FET – Future and Emerging Technologies programme. He is co-author of the inaugural FET Flagship Report. From 2013 to 2023, he led the Neurorobotics sub-project of the FET Flagship Human Brain Project.

From 2019 to 2020, he was Chief Digital Officer of Siemens Mobility Intelligent Traffic Systems ITS, now Yunex GmbH.

== Research ==
His research area includes cognitive sensor-based robots, multi-sensor data fusion, autonomous systems, embedded systems development: each of these in the application areas of automotive, manufacturing, medicine and intelligent transport systems. In these fields, he has published over 1000 peer-reviewed scientific papers and has served as an editor for international scientific journals and a conference organiser, including Chief Editor of the journal Frontiers in Neurorobotics.

He founded the IEEE’s “Humanoids” conference series and chaired the Humanoids2000 programme committee. In 2015, he was Programme Chair of the IEEE International Conference on Robots and Intelligent Systems (IROS) in Hamburg, Germany. He also helped found the IEEE Cyborgs and Bionic Systems (CBS) conference series and delivered the first keynote of the series at CBS 2017, was General Chair of CBS 2019 in Munich, Germany, and is a founding member of the IEEE Technical Committee for Cyborg & Bionic Systems.

Alois Knoll has supervised a large number of doctoral and postdoctoral students and guided them to their degrees. Several of his graduates and post-doctoral researchers have also become professors, either directly or via other positions, including Guang Chen, Manuel Giuliani, Florian Röhrbein and Jianwei Zhang. An essential part of his activities in the field of teaching was the establishment of the Master's programme “Robotics, Cognition and Intelligence” in 2010. Starting in its first year with a single-digit number of students, it has become the second largest programme of the former Faculty of Computer Science at TUM. Together with Klaus Kuhn, he founded the “Graduate School for Information Science in Health“ in 2008 and led it until it was transferred to the “Munich Institute of Biomedical Engineering”.

He has been involved in a large number of national and international large-scale scientific projects, both as a partner and as a coordinator for various funding bodies (including the European Union, German Research Foundation, NRF Singapore, Federal Ministry for Economic Affairs and Energy, Federal Ministry of Education and Research, Federal Ministry of Transport and Digital Infrastructure, and German Academic Exchange Service).

Alois Knoll is a recipient of the Carl Ramsauer Award, a member of the German Academy of Science and Engineering (Acatech), a Fellow of the University of Tokyo and an IEEE Fellow.

== Selected publications ==
- Yinlong Liu; Guang Chen; Alois Knoll (2020), "Globally Optimal Vertical Direction Estimation in Atlanta World", IEEE Transactions on Pattern Analysis and Machine Intelligence, 44 (4): 1949–1962, arXiv:1904.12717, doi:10.1109/TPAMI.2020.3027047, PMID 32986545, S2CID 215786098
- Alois Knoll; Christian Buckl; Karl-Josef Kuhn; Gernot Spiegelberg (2019), "The RACE Project: an Informatics-Driven Greenfield Approach to Future E/E-Architectures for Cars", Automotive Systems and Software Engineering: 171–195
- Zhenshan Bing; Claus Meschede; Florian Röhrbein; Kai Huang; Alois Knoll (2018), "A Survey of Robotics Control Based on Learning-Inspired Spiking Neural Networks", Frontiers in Neurorobotics, 12: 1–22
- Guang Chen; Zhenshan Bing; Florian Röhrbein; Jörg Conradt; Kai Huang; Long Cheng; Zhuangyi Jiang; Alois Knoll (2019), "Toward Brain-inspired Learning with the Neuromorphic Snake-like Robot and the Neurorobotic Platform", IEEE Transactions on Cognitive and Developmental Systems: 1–12
- Alois Knoll; Marc-Oliver Gewaltig (2016), "Neurorobotics: a strategic pillar of the human brain project", Brain-Inspired Intelligent Robotics: The Intersection of Robotics and Neuroscience, Science/AAAS, pp. 25–34
- Caixia Cai; Nikhil Somani; Alois Knoll (2016), "Orthogonal Image Features for Visual Servoing of a 6-DOF Manipulator with Uncalibrated Stereo Cameras" (PDF), IEEE Transactions on Robotics, 32 (2): 452–461, Bibcode:2016ITRob..32..452C, doi:10.1109/TRO.2016.2535443, S2CID 11552476
- Alexey Natekin; Alois Knoll (2013), "Gradient Boosting Machines, A Tutorial", Frontiers in Neurorobotics, 7: 1–21
- Alois Knoll; Hermann Mayer; Christoph Staub; Robert Bauernschmitt (2012), "Selective automation and skill transfer in medical robotics: a demonstration on surgical knot tying" (PDF), International Journal of Medical Robotics and Computer Assisted Surgery, 8 (4): 384–397, doi:10.1002/rcs.1419, PMID 22605676, S2CID 11194708
- Markus Huber; Alois Knoll; Thomas Brandt; Stefan Glasauer (2009), "Handing Over a Cube: Spatial Features of Physical Joint-Action", Annals of the New York Academy of Sciences: 380–382
- Giorgio Panin; Alois Knoll (2008), "Mutual Information-Based 3D Object Tracking", International Journal of Computer Vision, 78 (1): 107–118, doi:10.1007/s11263-007-0083-7, S2CID 11975483
- Alois Knoll; Torsten Scherer; Iris Poggendorf; Dirk Lütkemeyer; Jürgen Lehmann (2004), "Flexible Automation of Cell Culture and Tissue Engineering Tasks", Biotechnology Progress, 20 (6): 1825–1835, doi:10.1021/bp049759v, PMID 15575718, S2CID 11620985
- Jianwei Zhang; Alois Knoll (2003), "A two-arm situated artificial communicator for human-robot cooperative assembly" (PDF), IEEE Transactions on Industrial Electronics, 50 (4): 651–658, Bibcode:2003ITIE...50..651Z, doi:10.1109/TIE.2003.814767
- Alois Knoll (2001), "Distributed contract networks of sensor agents with adaptive reconfiguration – modelling, simulation, implementation" (PDF), Journal of the Franklin Institute, 338: 669–705, doi:10.1016/S0016-0032(01)00019-9
- Alois Knoll; B. Hildenbrandt; J. Zhang (1997), "Instructing cooperating assembly robots through situated dialogues in natural language", Proceedings of the IEEE International Conference on Robotics and Automation: 888–894
- Alois Knoll (1991), "Ultrasonic Holography Techniques for Localizing and Imaging Solid Objects", IEEE Transactions on Robotics and Automation, 7 (4): 449–467, Bibcode:1991ITRA....7..449K, doi:10.1109/70.86076
