= National Brain Research Centre =

Indian neuroscience research institute

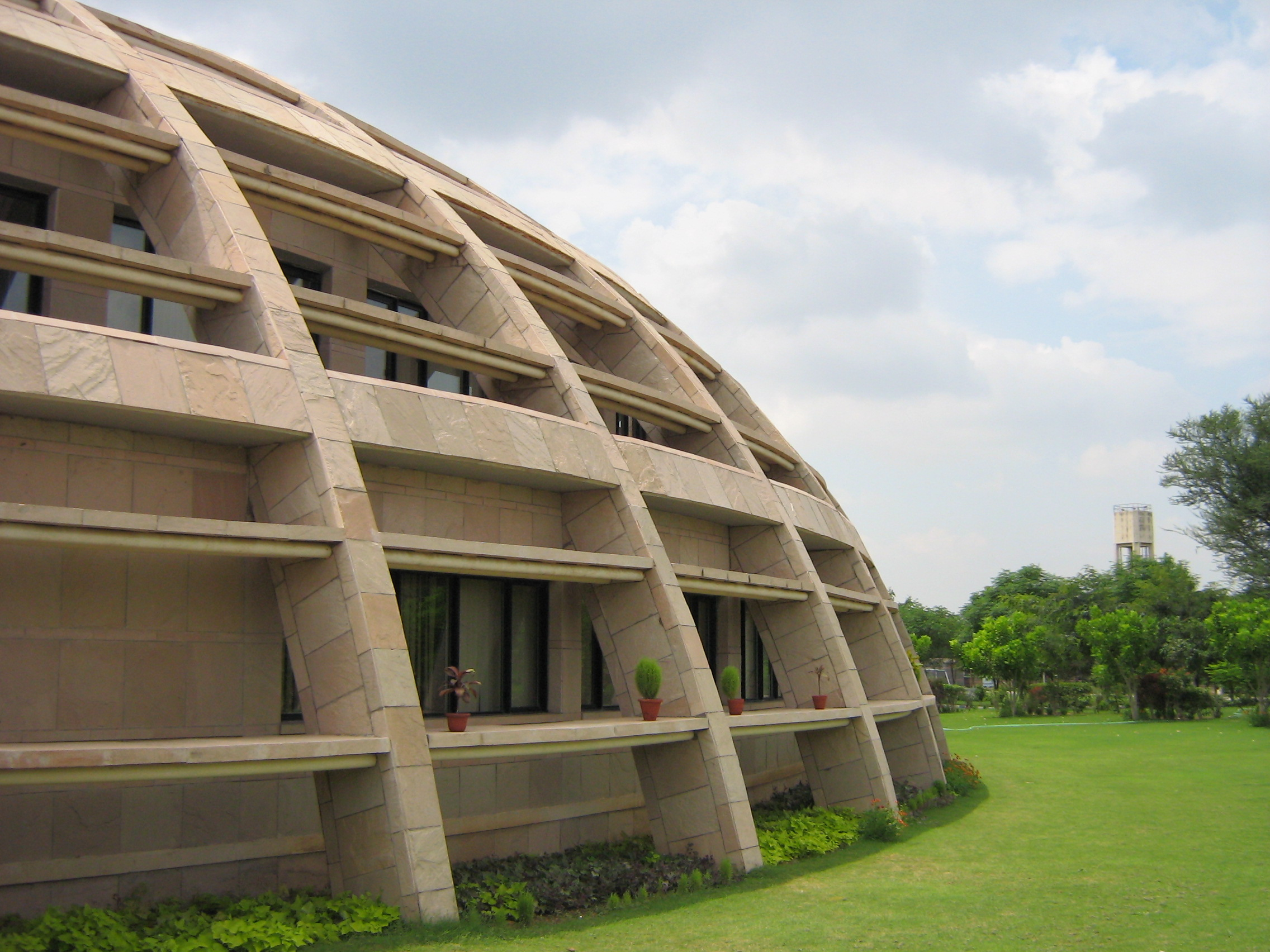
- Type: Autonomous Government Institute (Deemed University)
- Established: 1997; 29 years ago
- President: Union Minister of Science and Technology
- Director: Dr. Sagar Sengupta (additional charge)
- Location: Manesar, Gurugram, Haryana, India
- Campus: Semi-Urban
- Website: www.nbrc.ac.in

The National Brain Research Centre (NBRC) is a neuroscience research institute in Manesar, Gurugram, Haryana, India. It is an autonomous institute of the Department of Biotechnology under the Ministry of Science and Technology, Government of India. Its establishment was announced in 1997, and it was granted deemed university status in 2002. The institute moved to its campus at Manesar in 2003 and was formally inaugurated by President A. P. J. Abdul Kalam in December that year.

Research at NBRC covers cellular and molecular, systems, cognitive, computational and translational neuroscience, including work on Alzheimer's disease, Parkinson's disease and viral infections of the brain.

== History ==
A proposal to establish NBRC was put forward on 5 October 1995. The centre's creation was announced on 14 November 1997, during the golden jubilee of Indian independence and on the birth anniversary of former Prime Minister Jawaharlal Nehru. In 2000 it began functioning as an autonomous institute of the Department of Biotechnology from temporary premises at the International Centre for Genetic Engineering and Biotechnology in New Delhi. The Ministry of Human Resource Development, now the Ministry of Education, granted it deemed university status in 2002. On 16 December 2003 the institute moved to its campus in the foothills of the Aravalli Range at Manesar.

The neurologist Prakash Narain Tandon was the founding chairman of the NBRC Society. Vijayalakshmi Ravindranath was the founding director and was succeeded by Subrata Sinha and Neeraj Jain.

In 2005 NBRC and the All India Institute of Medical Sciences set up a jointly administered Centre of Excellence for Epilepsy. In 2006 the institute established a National Neuroimaging Facility with a 3-tesla magnetic resonance imaging scanner and equipment for electroencephalography and evoked potential recording. In 2007 it formed a Translational and Clinical Neuroscience Unit and opened a neurology outpatient department at the Civil Hospital, Gurgaon. NBRC began leading the National Dementia Programme in 2017, and in 2019 it launched a programme on the comparative mapping of common mental disorders across the lifespan.

== Research ==
Research at NBRC is organised into five divisions: cellular and molecular neuroscience, systems neuroscience, cognitive neuroscience, computational neuroscience, and translational neuroscience. Work at the institute covers the senses of touch and hearing, speech learning, memory and spatial navigation. Disease-related research has included Alzheimer's disease, Parkinson's disease, dementia, Japanese encephalitis, Zika virus disease, neuroAIDS, brain tumors, spinal cord injury, stroke, and the effects of SARS-CoV-2 on the brain.

=== Selected studies ===
NBRC researchers have used magnetic resonance spectroscopy to study brain chemistry in Alzheimer's disease. Studies reported depletion of the antioxidant glutathione in the hippocampus and in frontal and cingulate regions, which the researchers linked to cognitive decline, and a shift towards alkalinity in the pH of the left hippocampal formation. A multi-centre study identified open and closed conformations of glutathione in the brains of healthy young participants. The same technique was used in a 2021 study of brain chemistry in people who had recovered from COVID-19 or had been asymptomatic, which examined glutamate and GABA levels as possible markers of mental health.

A 2020 study examined the role of the thalamus in the reorganisation of connectivity between large-scale brain networks during healthy ageing.

In a collaborative study, researchers found that dengue and Japanese encephalitis viruses cause platelets to release platelet factor 4, which suppresses interferon production; blocking its receptor CXCR3 inhibited viral replication in laboratory and animal experiments. Another study found that the Zika virus envelope protein alters the properties of human fetal neural stem cells by modulating microRNA circuitry, a mechanism examined in relation to Zika-associated microcephaly. Work in roundworms showed that the microRNA let-7 regulates axonal self-fusion, a process that restored touch sensation after nerve injury. A 2021 laboratory study examined the effect of glycyrrhizin, a compound found in liquorice, on HMGB1 release and viral replication in lung cells expressing SARS-CoV-2 proteins.

=== Tools and databases ===
Tools developed at NBRC include the Dyslexia Assessment for Languages of India (DALI), a set of screening, assessment and remediation materials for dyslexia in Hindi, Kannada, Marathi and English, and BRAHMA, a set of brain templates for analysing structural and functional neuroimaging data from the Indian population. GAURI is a system that uses MRI data and neuropsychological tests for diagnosing Alzheimer's and Parkinson's diseases, and ANSH is a database of neuroimaging and neurochemical data from healthy older adults, people with mild cognitive impairment and people with Alzheimer's disease, intended for multi-site research. Other software described by NBRC researchers includes KALPANA, for processing magnetic resonance spectroscopy data; BHARAT, a big data framework for identifying early diagnostic markers of Alzheimer's disease; and PRATEEK, for integrating data from multiple neuroimaging methods.

== Facilities ==
Facilities at NBRC include the National Neuroimaging Facility, the Centre of Excellence for Epilepsy with its magnetoencephalography facility, a neuroimaging and neurospectroscopy laboratory, and a speech and language laboratory that studies cortical language pathways in Hindi–English biscriptal adults and children. Its experimental animal facility, registered with the Committee for the Purpose of Control and Supervision of Experiments on Animals, houses animal models including primates and transgenic mice. The translational and clinical neuroscience unit provides neurology outpatient services. The institute hosts a Distributed Information Centre under the Department of Biotechnology's Biotechnology Information System Network, and its researchers have access to DeLCON, the department's electronic library consortium.
