= Sandra Zilles =

Canadian computer scientist

Sandra Zilles is a German and Canadian computer scientist, the Canada Research Chair in Computational Learning Theory at the University of Regina. Her research area encompasses machine learning and computational learning theory.

== Education and career ==
Zilles was an undergraduate in Germany, at the Technical University of Kaiserslautern, where she earned a diploma in mathematics in 2000 and a Ph.D. in computer science in 2004. Her dissertation, Uniform Learning of Recursive Functions, was jointly supervised by Rolf Wiehagen and Thomas Zeugmann.

From 2004 to 2008 she was a senior researcher at the German Research Centre for Artificial Intelligence. In 2007 she began a postdoctoral research visit to the University of Alberta, and in 2009 she joined the University of Regina as an assistant professor. She was given a tier 2 Canada Research Chair in 2010, promoted to associate professor in 2013, and promoted again to full professor in 2019. In 2022 she was given a tier 1 Canada Research Chair.

She regularly teaches machine learning, computational learning theory and advanced data structures and algorithm design. She also serves as an associate editor of the IEEE Transactions on Pattern Analysis and Machine Intelligence (since 2020) as well as the Journal of Computer and System Sciences (since 2014).

== Recognition ==
In 2014, the Canadian Association of Computer Science named her as one of three Outstanding Young Computer Science Researchers. She was named to the College of New Scholars, Artists, and Scientists of the Royal Society of Canada in 2017.
