= Karl Zilles =

German neuroscientist and anatomist

- Born: April 1, 1944; Würzburg, Germany
- Died: April 26, 2020 (aged 76)
- Occupation(s): Neuroscientist, anatomist
- Years active: 1991–2012 (as professor)
- Known for: Brain research
- Medical career
- Institutions: University of Düsseldorf; Institute for Brain Research

Karl Zilles (1 April 1944 — 26 April 2020) was a German neuroscientist and anatomist. From 1991 to 2012, he was professor at the University of Düsseldorf and director of the C. and O. Vogt Institute for Brain Research.
