= RIKEN Brain Science Institute =

Japanese research institution

Coordinates: 35°46′44.4″N 139°36′46.5″E

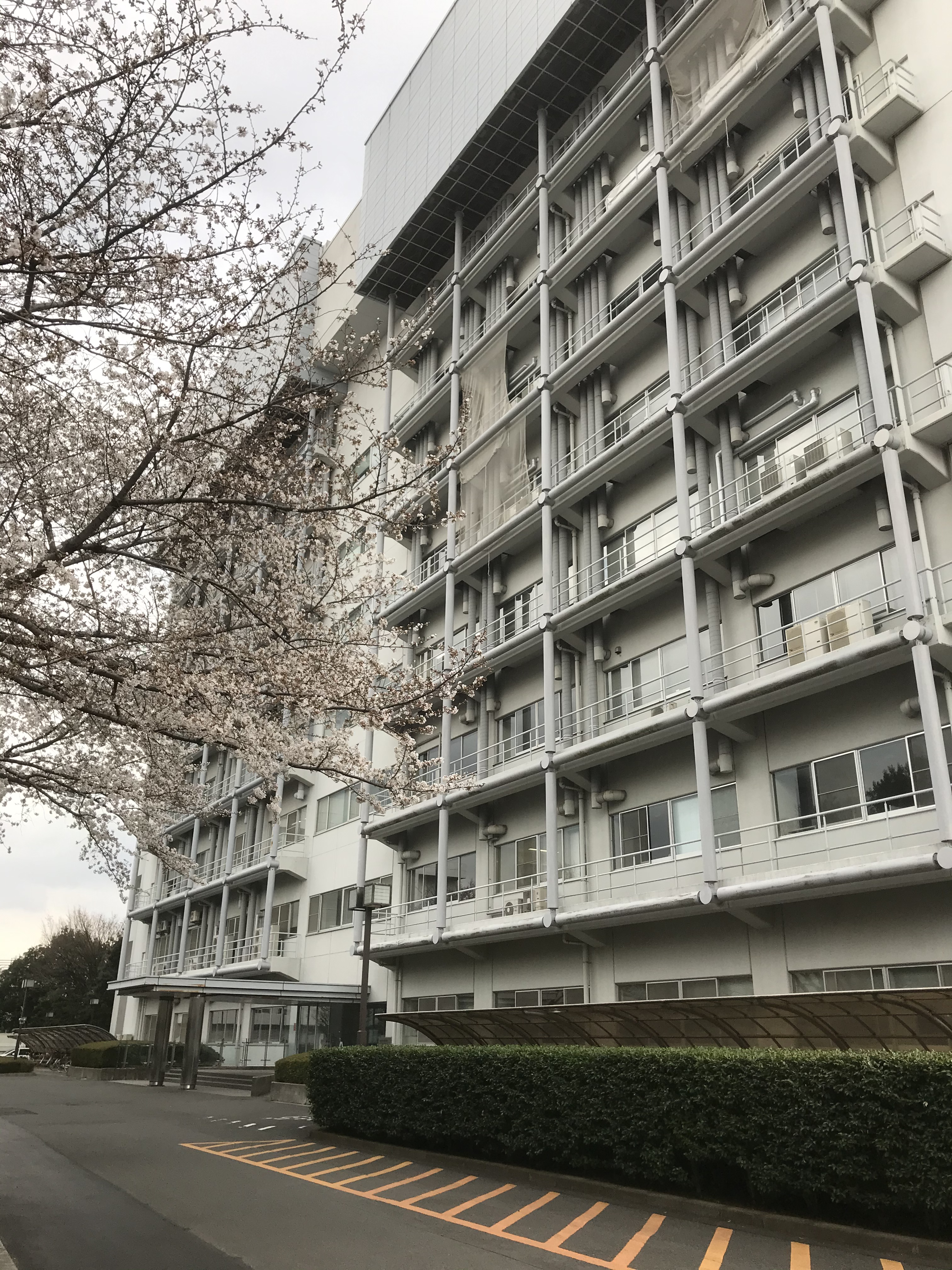
Brain Science Central building

RIKEN Brain Science Institute (RIKEN-BSI) was established in 1997 as part of RIKEN, focusing on neuroscience research located in Wakō city, Saitama Prefecture in the greater Tokyo area, Japan. In 2018 RIKEN-BSI has been reorganized as RIKEN Center for Brain Science, a new center under RIKEN. Yasushi Miyashita became the first Director of RIKEN-CBS.The current director is Ryoichiro Kageyama (2021-).

== Overview of RIKEN-BSI ==
Masao Ito, formerly a professor at the Faculty of Medicine of Tokyo University, joined RIKEN as the second director of the (former) International Frontier System and initiated the neuroscience research in RIKEN in 1989 after his retirement. It was first major move towards biological science in RIKEN, which had been dominated by physics and chemistry. In 1997, it was expanded to become BSI and Ito became the first director. Subsequently, it was led by the second director, Shun'ichi Amari and interim director Keiji Tanaka, and then currently by 1987 Nobel laureate Susumu Tonegawa (2009-).

Aiming at an interdisciplinary understanding of the brain, its research target ranges from molecular and cell biology to cognitive and computational neuroscience.
