= List of Savitribai Phule Pune University people =

This is a list of notable people related to Savitribai Phule Pune University. Excluded from this list are those people whose only connection with Savitribai Phule Pune University is that they were awarded an honorary degree.

== Politics and government ==
=== Heads of state and government ===
Name	Class Year	Degree	College	Notability	References
Khaled Bahah		B.Com.; M.Com.		2nd Vice President of Yemen and Prime Minister of Yemen	
Pratibha Patil			Mooljee Jetha	12th President of India	
Vishwanath Pratap Singh				7th Prime Minister of India	

Note that P.V. Narasimha Rao, 9th Prime Minister of India, graduated from Fergusson College, when the college was under the University of Mumbai.

=== Others ===
Name	Class Year	Degree	College	Notability	References
Agatha Sangma				former Member of Parliament of India	
Anil Shirole				Member of Parliament of India	
Bhawani Singh			Deccan College	member of the 1st Lok Sabha, studied at Deccan College	
Gautam Bambawale			Fergusson (Note: The Fergusson College has been affiliated to the Pune University since 1948.)	High Commissioner of India to Pakistan	
Ranjan Mathai				ex-foreign secretary of India	
Sharad Pawar			BMCC	former Chief Minister of Maharashtra	
Kenneth Chawngliana				4th Speaker of Mizoram Legislative Assembly	
Vilasrao Deshmukh				14th Chief Minister of Maharashtra	

== Business ==
Name	Class Year	Degree	College	Notability	References
Cyrus S. Poonawalla	1966		BMCC	Indian billionaire, recipient of the Padma Shri	
Ronak Gupta	2012	MBA	SPPU	Founder of CosmicByte	

== Military ==
Name	Class Year	Degree	College	Notability	References
Sunil Kumar Choudhary				officer in the Gorkha regiment of the Indian Army; Recipient of Kirti Chakra	

== Science and engineering ==
Name	Class Year	Degree	College	Notability	References
Padmanabhan Balaram	1967	BSc in Chemistry		chemist and director of the Indian Institute of Science; recipient of the Shanti Swarup Bhatnagar Prize	
V. S. Huzurbazar				statistician, first head of the statistics department of Pune University	

- Akhil Chandra Banerjea, virologist, N-BIOS laureate
- John Barnabas, evolutionary biologist, Shanti Swarup Bhatnagar Prize (1974)
- Rajani A. Bhisey, epidemiologist specialising in environmental carcinogenesis and molecular epidemiology of cancer.
- Dipshikha Chakravortty, microbiologist, N-Bios laureate
- Shridhar Ramachandra Gadre, chemist and professor at the Indian Institute of Technology Kanpur; recipient of the Shanti Swarup Bhatnagar Prize for Science and Technology in Chemical Science (1993)
- Sanjeev Galande, epigeneticist, Shanti Swarup Bhatnagar (2010) laureate
- Faisal Hawar, engineer and entrepreneur, CEO/President and co-founder of the International Somalia Development Foundation as well as the Maakhir Resource Company
- Yogesh M. Joshi, rheologist, Shanti Swarup Bhatnagar (2015) laureate
- Thomas Kailath, electrical engineer, information theorist; recipient of the 2007 IEEE Medal of Honor; recipient of the 2014 National Medal of Science; Hitachi America Professor of Engineering at Stanford University
- Nissim Kanekar, astrophysicist, Shanti Swarup Bhatnagar laureate
- Vistasp Karbhari, civil engineer, President of the University of Texas at Arlington
- Sulabha K Kulkarni, physicist, Visiting Faculty, IISER Pune
- Kantilal Mardia, statistician and Guy Medallist, Senior Research Professor at the University of Leeds
- Goverdhan Mehta, chemist, recipient of the Shanti Swarup Bhatnagar Prize for Science and Technology in Chemical Science (1978)
- Kullal Chickappu Naik, agricultural scientist.
- Deepak T. Nair, molecular biologist, Shanti Swarup Bhatnagar laureate
- Suhas Patankar, mechanical engineer and professor at the University of Minnesota; pioneer in the field of computational fluid dynamics (CFD) and finite volume method.
- C. Kumar N. Patel, electrical engineer, inventor of the carbon dioxide laser; recipient of the 1996 National Medal of Science; vice Chancellor for Research at the University of California, Los Angeles
- Kanury Venkata Subba Rao, immunologist, Shanti Swarup Bhatnagar (1997) laureate
- Ramakrishnan Raman, Vice Chancellor of Symbiosis International University
- Bhaskar Saha, immunologist, Shanti Swarup Bhatnagar (2009) laureate
- K. B. Sainis, immunologist, Shanti Swarup Bhatnagar (1994) laureate
- Vinod Scaria, bioinformatician, sequenced the first Indian genome
- Krityunjai Prasad Sinha, theoretical physicist, Shanti Swarup Bhatnagar (1974) laureate
- K. George Thomas, nanotechnologist, Shanti Swarup Bhatnagar (2006) laureate
- Mohan R. Wani, cell biologist, N-BIOS laureate

== Humanities and social sciences ==
- Anupama Jain, Indian writer
- G. P. Deshpande, playwright and academic, Sahitya Akademi Award (1996)
- Jyoti Gogte, Indian academician
- Kiran Nagarkar, novelist, recipient of the 2001 Sahitya Akademi Award
- Nagnath Lalujirao Kottapalle, educationist and Marathi writer; taught at the Marathi department
- Purushottam Laxman Deshpande, Marathi writer, Padma Bhushan (1990)
- Ram Shankar Tripathi, Indian Sanskrit scholar and Padma Shri awardee
- Rashid Askari, Bangladeshi bilingual writer, distinguished academic, translator and public university Vice-chancellor
- Satish Alekar, playwright
- Sharmila Rege, Indian sociologist and formerly Director of the Women's Studies Centre at the University of Pune
- Vijay Kelkar, economist, academic and Chairman of the 13th Finance Commission of India

== Media and entertainment ==
- Radhika Apte, model and actress
- Mukta Barve, Marathi actress who starred in National Award-winning movie Jogwa
- Pooja Batra, model and actress
- Shereen Bhan, journalist
- Mini Menon, journalist
- Radhika Chaudhari, actress
- Tanushree Dutta, model and actress
- Mugdha Godse, model and actress
- Prahlad Kakkar, ad film director
- Sonali Kulkarni, actress
- Shaiju Mathew, author and filmmaker
- Anjali Menon, Malayalam film director
- Arjun Radhakrishnan, actor

== Sports ==
Name	Class Year	Degree	College	Notability	References
Akshayraj Kore			MMMCOE	chess grandmaster	
Stephie D'Souza			Fergusson	athlete	

== Others ==
- Nabeel Rajab, Bahraini human rights activist
- Shivani Verma (BK Shivani), spiritual speaker
