= Huzurbazar =

Huzurbazar is a surname. Notable people with the surname include:

- Aparna V. Huzurbazar, American statistician, daughter of V. S. and sister of Snehalata
- Snehalata V. Huzurbazar, American statistician, daughter of V. S. and sister of Aparna
- V. S. Huzurbazar (1919–1991), Indian statistician, father of Aparna and Snehalata
