= Rajyotsava Awards (2008) =

Awards given by the government of Karnataka, India

2008 Rajyotsava Awards
- Date: 1 November 2008
- Location: Bangalore, Karnataka
- Country: India
- Presented by: Government of Karnataka

The list of Karnataka Rajyotsava Award recipients for the year 2008 is below.

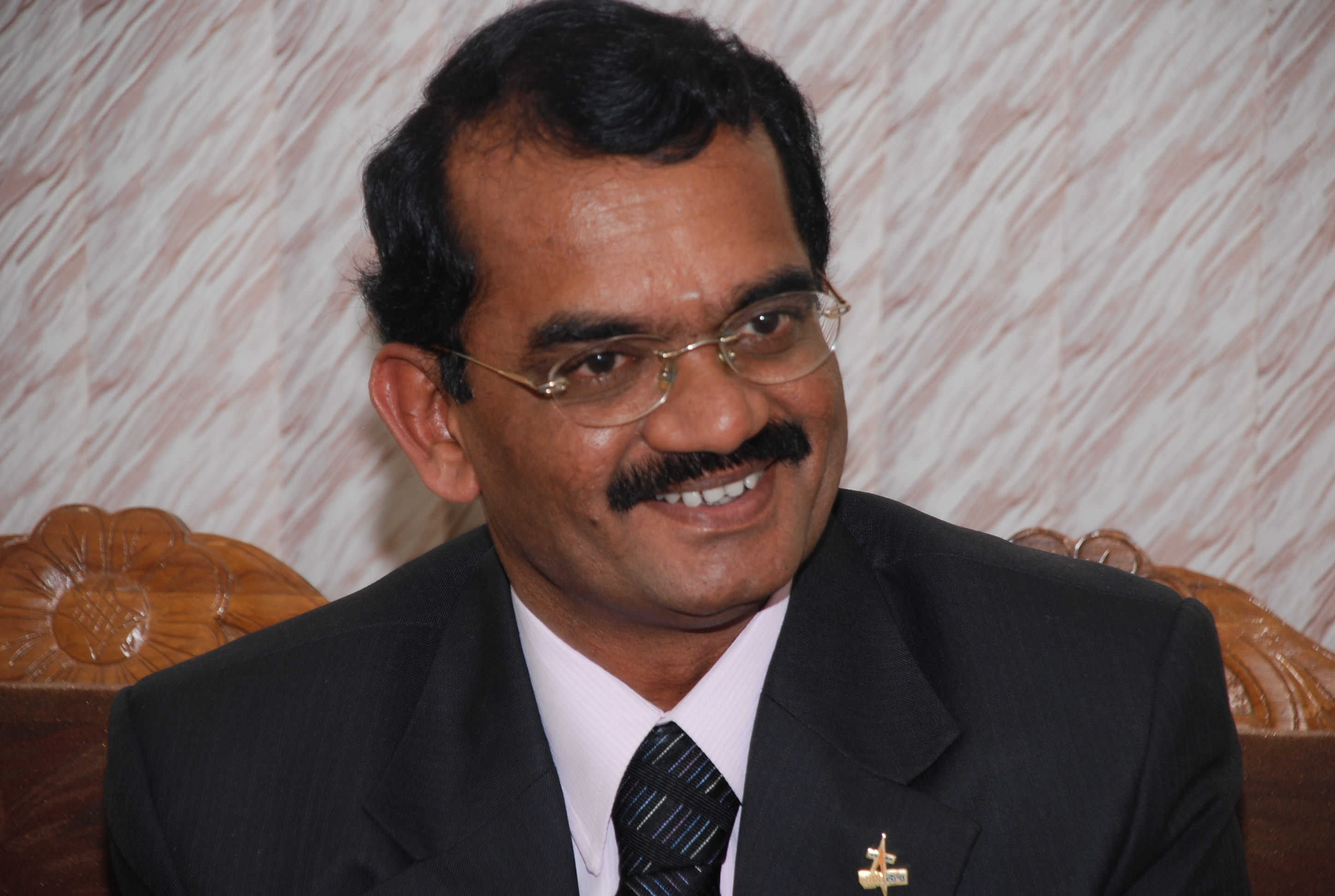
Mylswamy Annadurai

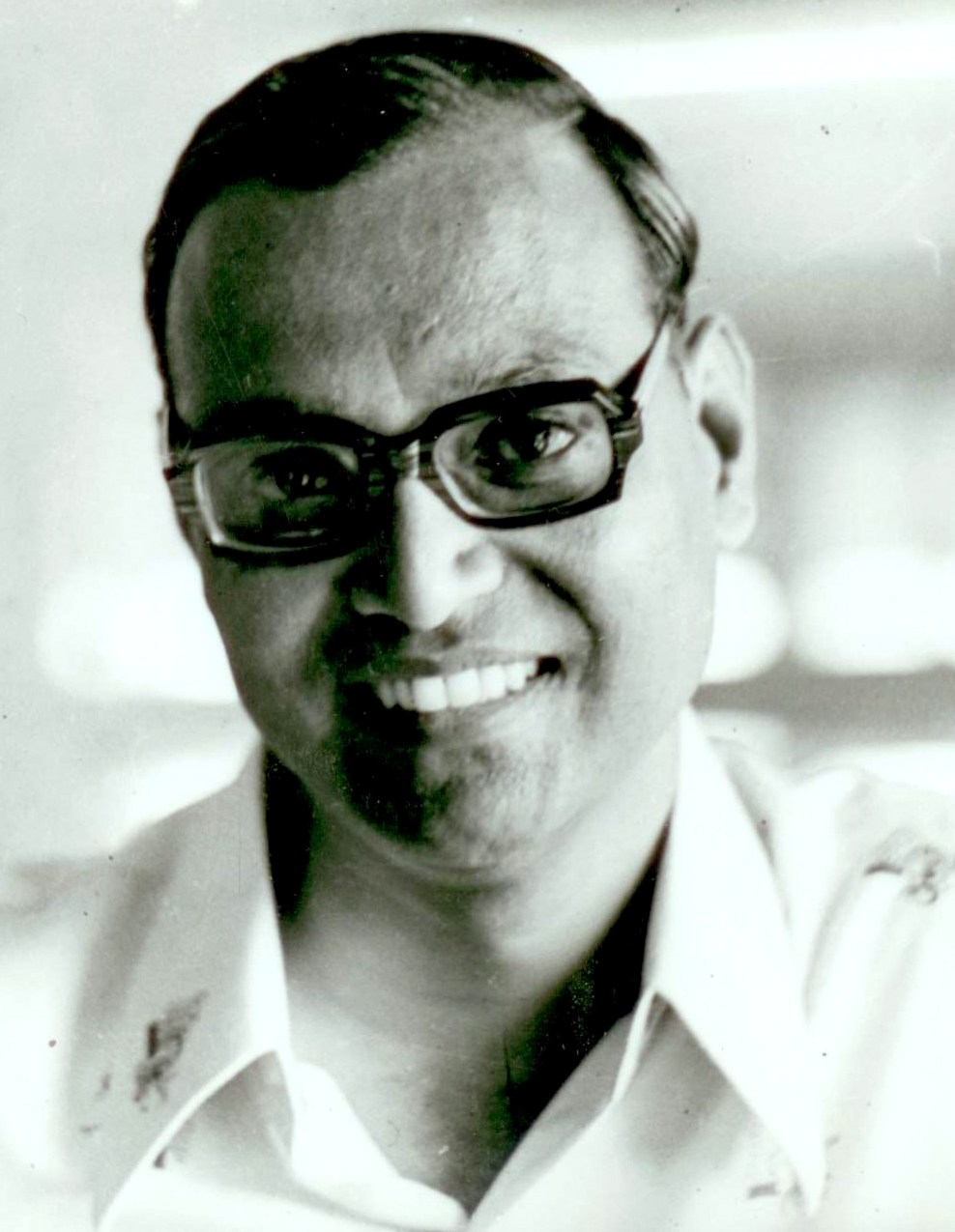
S. R. Ramaswamy

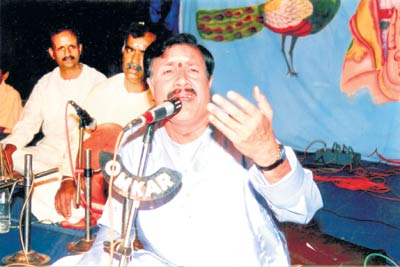
M. G. Venkata Raghavan

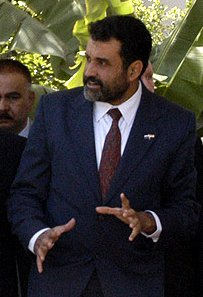
T. V. Mohandas Pai

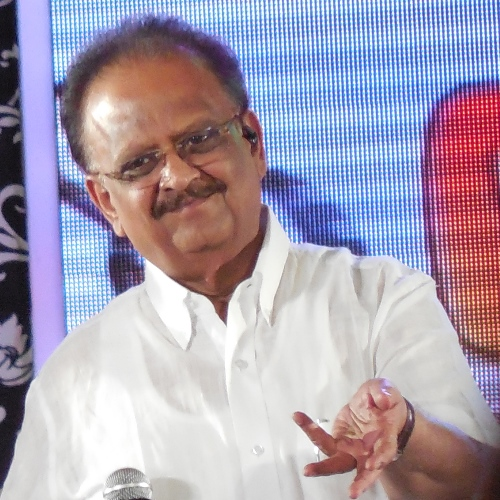
S. P. Balasubrahmanyam

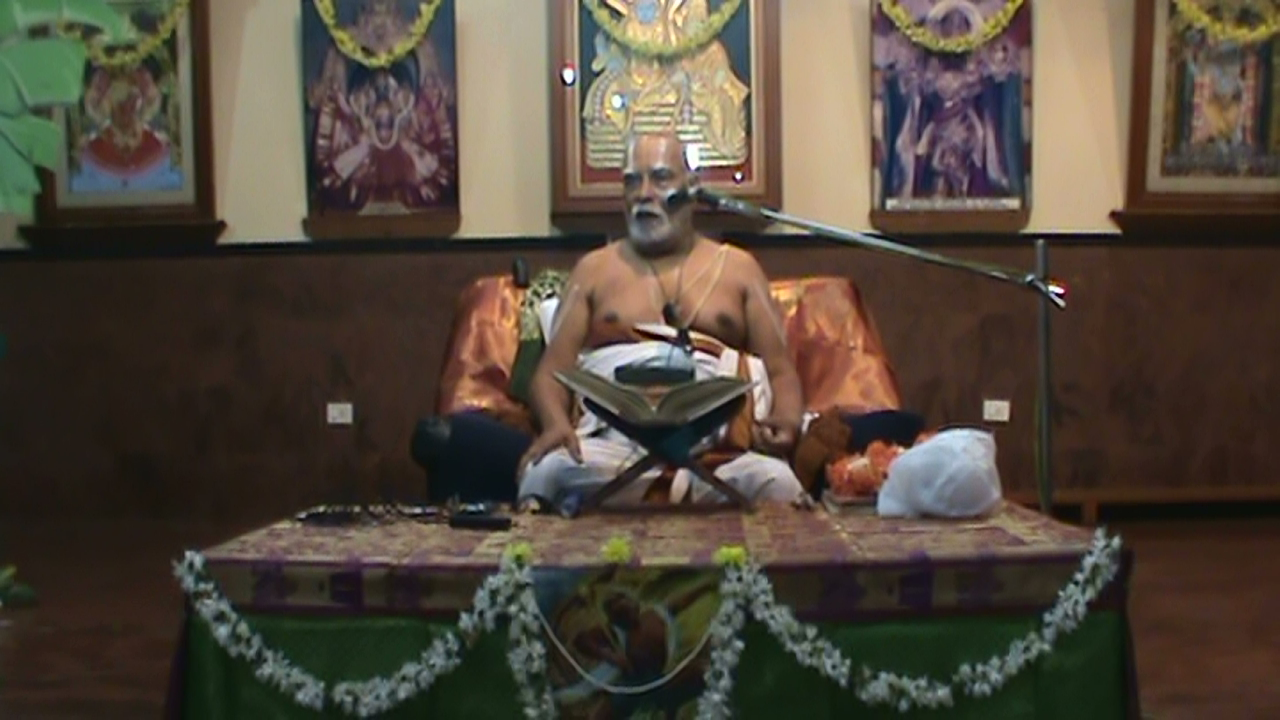
K. S. Narayanacharya

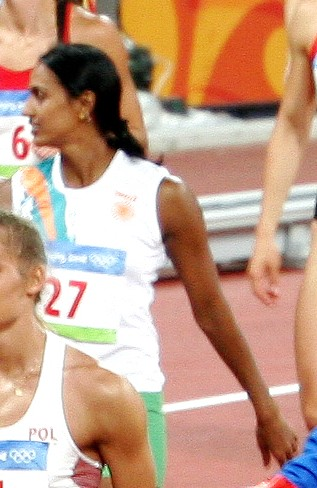
J. J. Shobha

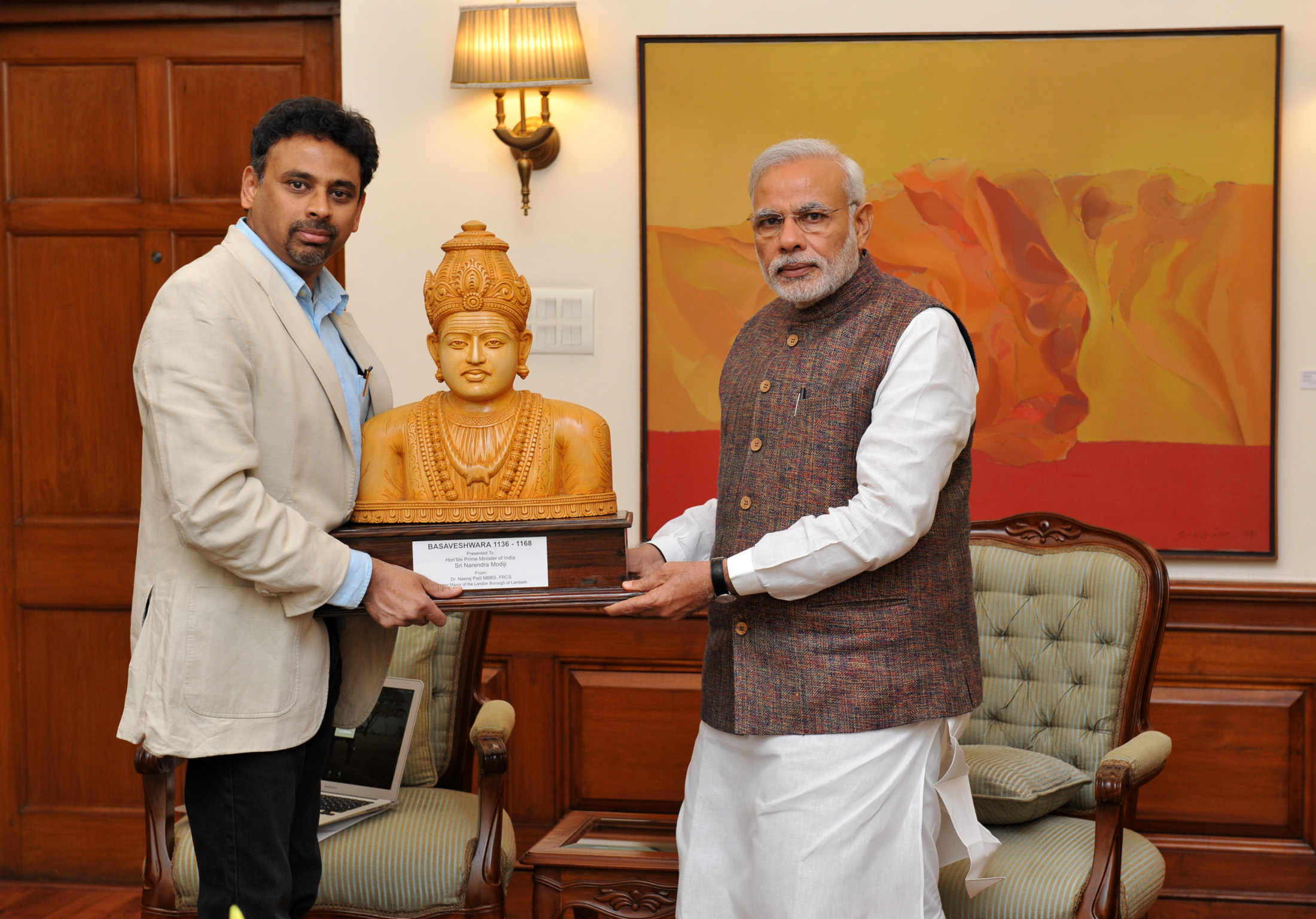
Neeraj Patil

Recipient	Field
Mylswamy Annadurai	Science
S. K. Shivkumar	Science
Padmanabhan Balaram	Science
Vijaya Dabbe	Literature
S. G. Siddaramaiah	Literature
Veeranna Rajoor	Literature
S. R. Ramaswamy	Literature
Farida Rahamatulla	Literature
Sannarama Naika	Literature
Ambathanaya Mudradi	Literature
Meerabai Koppikar	Agriculture
Papamma Papanna	Agriculture
G. P. Shetty	Agriculture
Thammanna Maani Nayaka	Freedom Struggle
T. V. Mohandas Pai	Information Technology
Anant Koppar	Information Technology
M. G. Venkata Raghavan	Music
Sangameshwar Swamy Hiremath	Music
Hanumantha Rao Mudhol	Music
Shivappa Yellappa Bhajantri	Music
B. Shankar Rao	Music
T. V. Raju	Music
Yashwant Halibandi	Music
Shanta Anand	Music
K. L. Narayanaswamy	Arts
V. Ramamurthy	Theatre
Vani Saraswathi Naidu	Theatre
B. M. Krishna Gowda	Theatre
Malathi Sudhir	Theatre
Byregowda Marisiddaiah	Theatre
Geetha Baali	Dance
Ambalike Hiriyanna	Folklore
Eerabadappa	Folklore
Shivalingappa Hagaluveshagaara	Folklore
Chowdike Uchchangamma	Folklore
Bovi Jayamma	Folklore
Lingadaveeraru Mahadevappa	Folklore
K. Govinda Bhatta	Yakshagana
Sannakki Banglegudda	Yakshagana
Pathala Venkataramana Bhat	Yakshagana
Aralaguppe Nanjappa	Yakshagana
V. M. Solapurkar	Painting
Chandranath Acharya	Painting
Yashwant Hibare	Painting
B. G. Mohammed	Painting
Jayannachar	Painting
K. Narayana Rao	Painting
Gunavantheshwara Bhat	Painting
S. K. Bhagavan	Cinema
S. P. Balasubrahmanyam	Cinema
Saikumar	Cinema
Basant Kumar Patil	Cinema
Prameela Joshai	Cinema
Srinivas Kadavigere	Cinema
H. V. Kotresh	Medicine
D. Nagaraj	Medicine
Subrayappa	Medicine
Venkataramana Neelam	Medicine
B. K. Srinivasamurthy	Medicine
Padmaraj Dandavathi	Media
Krishnamurthy Hegde	Media
Ravi Belagere	Media
K. B. Ganapathi	Media
B. S. Namalya	Media
Chandrakanth	Media
Imran Qureshi	Media
K. S. Narayanacharya	Education
V. B. Kutinho	Education
Basavaraj Patil Sedam	Education
Kuranji Venkataramana Gowda	Education
Puttaraju	Handicrafts
Narayanappa	Handicrafts
J. J. Shobha	Sports
Shikha Tandon	Sports
N. R. Narayana Rao	Social Work
S. S. Patil	Social Work
P. Vali	Social Work
S. C. Burman	Social Work
Kevalchand	Social Work
Siddanagowda Patil	Social Work
Nitin Shah	Social Work
Uday B. Prakaah	Overseas Kannadiga
Neeraj Patil	Overseas Kannadiga
M. B. Udoshi	Overseas Kannadiga
Vijay Kumar Shetty	Overseas Kannadiga
Upendra Bhat	Overseas Kannadiga
Uma Mysorekar	Overseas Kannadiga
T. L. Devaraj	Ayurveda
Jayadevappa	Medicine
S. M. Shankaracharya	Sculpture
Vijayalakshmi	Medicine
Ashok Badaradinni	Theatre
