= Deepak T. Nair =

Indian academic (born 1973)

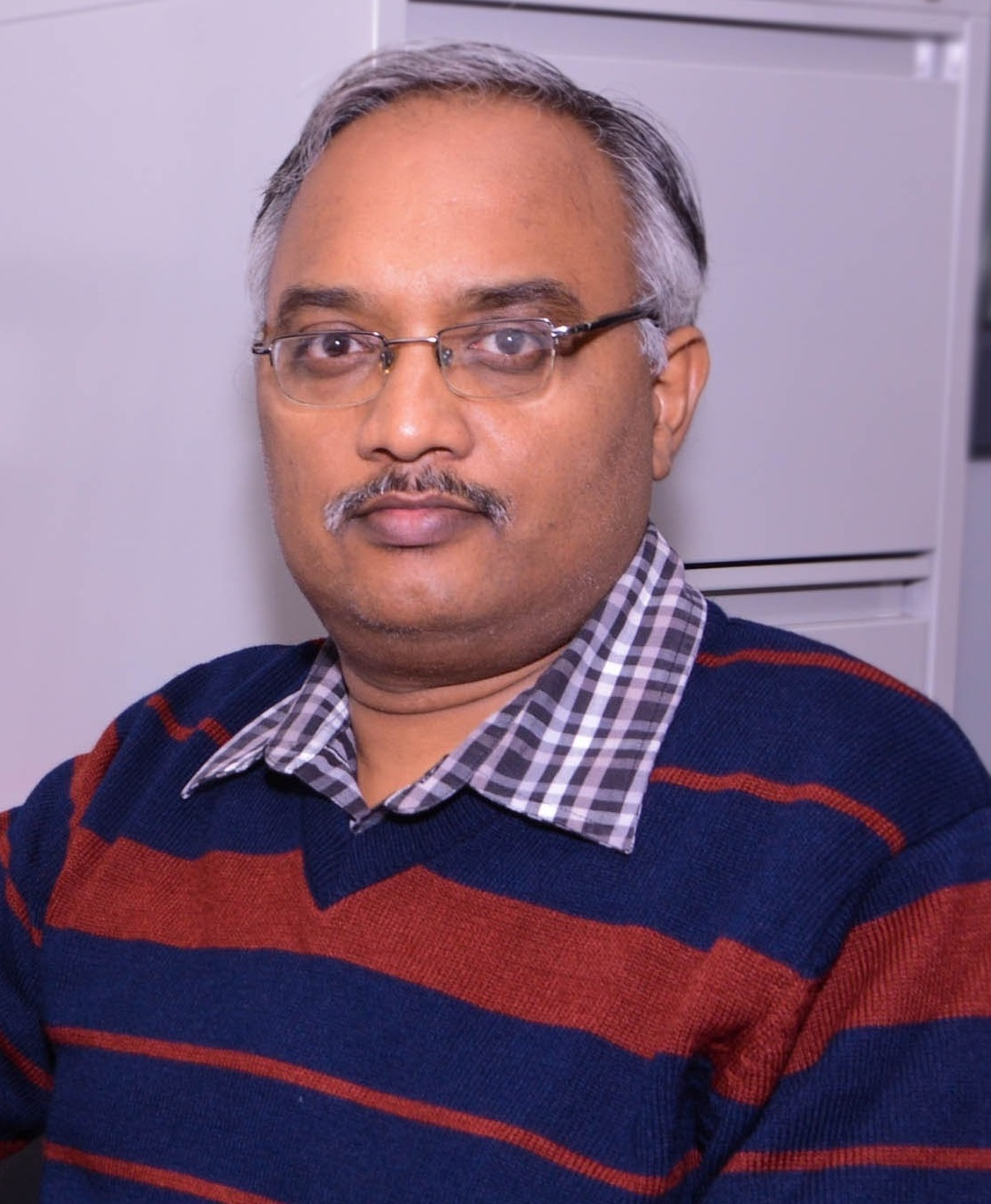
- Prof . Deepak T. Nair
- Born: 25 October 1973 (age 52); Pune, India
- Education: Savitribai Phule Pune University; National Institute of Immunology, India; Mount Sinai Medical Center
- Known for: Studies on DNA polymerases and RNA polymerases
- Awards: 2014 N-BIOS Prize; 2017 Shanti Swarup Bhatnagar Prize
- Scientific career
- Fields: Molecular biology
- Workplaces: National Centre for Biological Sciences; Regional Centre for Biotechnology

Deepak Thankappan Nair (born 25 October 1973) is an Indian Structural Biologist and a scientist at the Regional Centre for Biotechnology. He is known for his studies on DNA and RNA polymerases. Deepak was a Ramanujan fellow of the Science and Engineering Research Board (2008–2013) and a recipient of the National BioScience Award for Career Development (Dept of Biotechnology). The Council of Scientific and Industrial Research, the apex agency of the Government of India for scientific research, awarded him the Shanti Swarup Bhatnagar Prize for Science and Technology, one of the highest Indian science awards, for his contributions to biological sciences in 2017. (Note: Long link – please select award year to see details) He was inducted as a fellow of the Indian National Science Academy (New Delhi, India) in December 2022. The Haryana government awarded him the Haryana Vigyan Ratna Award for the year 2024.

== Early life and education ==
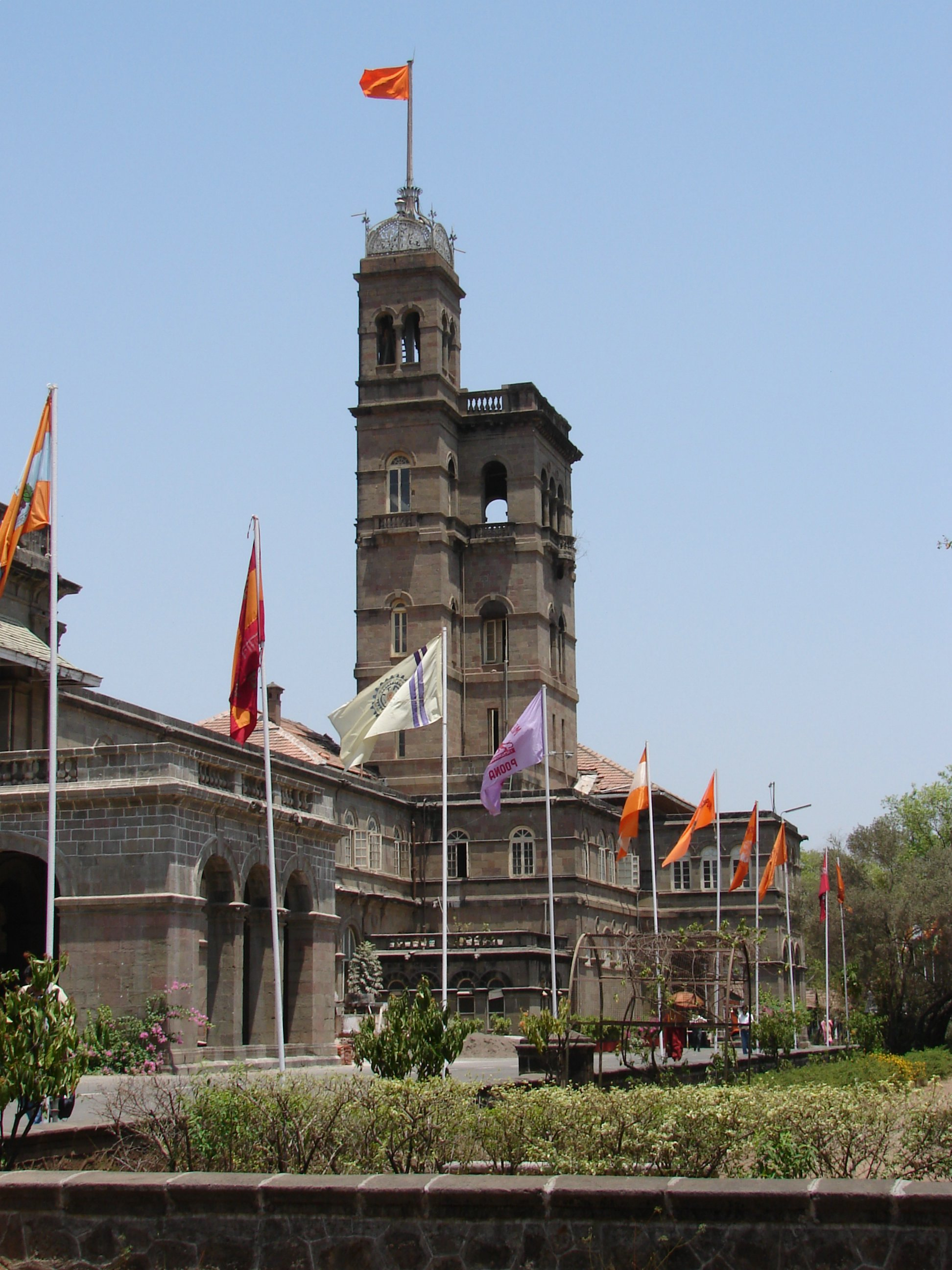
University of Pune

Deepak parents are from the southern state of Kerala, and was born in Pune in the western state of Maharashtra on 25 October 1973. Nair attended the Jai Hind High School (Pimpri) and later went to the St. Vincent's Junior College (Pune). He graduated with a BSc in chemistry from Fergusson College (1994) and completed his master's in biotechnology from the Savitribai Phule Pune University (1996). Subsequently, he enrolled for his doctoral studies at the National Institute of Immunology, India, to secure a PhD in structural immunology in 2001. For his PhD, he worked under the supervision of Dr. Dinakar Mashnu Salunke. Later, he moved to the US to complete his post-doctoral work in Prof. Aneel K. Aggarwal's laboratory at the Mount Sinai Medical Center.

== Work ==
He returned to India in 2007 to take up the position of an independent investigator at the National Centre for Biological Sciences. He worked in NCBS as Reader-F (2007–2013) and associate professor (2013–2014). In July 2014, he joined the Regional Centre for Biotechnology as an associate professor and was promoted to professor in July 2019.

== Research ==
Deepak Nair has obtained new insight regarding the molecular mechanisms that determine the fidelity of the replication process in bacteria and flaviviruses. Recently, his laboratory contributed towards our understanding of DNA mismatch Repair in prokaryotes. His laboratory has shed new light on the strategy utilized by DNA polymerases to prevent ribonucleotide incorporation. In 2018, his laboratory showed that pyrophosphate hydrolysis is an intrinsic and critical step in the DNA synthesis reaction catalyzed by DNA polymerases, and this discovery was accorded breakthrough status by the journal Nucleic Acids Chemistry. Regarding the piggyBac transposase, his laboratory has shown that the dimerization through the Ring Finger Domain present at the C-terminus attenuates the excision activity of this enzyme. He has discovered the mechanism employed by DNA polymerase IV to rescue replication stalled at damaged nucleotides with unprecedented efficiency and accuracy. Nair has provided insight into how specialized DNA polymerases that participate in adaptive mutagenesis ensure the achievement of function. His laboratory has shown how GTP binding to the viral RNA-dependent-RNA polymerase ensures accurate initiation of replication of the viral genome (Nucleic Acids Research, 2014, 42:2758–2573). In addition, he has shown that reactive oxygen species play an important role in the antimicrobial activity of bactericidal antibiotics (Angew Chem Int Ed Engl. 2016 55:2397-400). In collaboration with D. N. Rao (Department of Biochemistry, IISc), his laboratory has also contributed towards understanding how proteins involved in the post-replicative repair of DNA mismatches function. His laboratory has shown that the proofreading domain of the Pfprex DNA polymerase from Plasmodium falciparum is capable of removing misincorporated oxidized nucleotides from the primer and translesion DNA synthesis past common oxidized template nucleotides. Recently, his laboratory has helped characterize a monoclonal antibody that can neutralize different Variants-of-Concern of the SARS-CoV-2 virus. Using computational tools, his laboratory has also identified possible inhibitors of the RNA-dependent-RNA polymerase (IUBMB Life, 2020, 72:2112) and proofreading exoribonuclease from SARS-CoV-2. His laboratory also provided the structure of P4A2, a broadly neutralizing anti-SARS-CoV-2 mAb, in complex with the Receptor-Binding-Domain of the Spike protein. So far, he has been centrally involved in the deposition of 76 entries in the protein data bank, a repository of three-dimensional structures of biological macromolecules.

As a post-doctoral fellow (Dec 2001 – July 2007), he focused on understanding the structural basis of DNA lesion bypass by eukaryotic Y-family DNA polymerases using X-ray crystallography. Due to the action of various agents, lesions are formed on DNA, which interfere with normal replication and may also prove carcinogenic. Eukaryotes possess up to four specialized DNA polymerases that can synthesize DNA across these lesions and thus prevent the replication fork from stalling. Nair determined the crystal structure of the catalytic cores of two such polymerases, human DNA polymerase iota (hPolι) and yeast REV1 (yREV1) –in complex with DNA and incoming nucleotide. The structures of hPolι and yRev1 in complex with undamaged and damaged DNA has shown that these two polymerases prefer altered modes of base-pairing in the active site to facilitate lesion bypass;. Both hPolι and yREV1 have unique active sites that facilitate the formation of non-Watson-Crick base pairs to achieve lesion bypass and rescue stalled replication. He also played a role in determining the structure of a third Y-family polymerase, human DNA Polymerase kappa, in its functional state. In addition, he also participated in projects aimed at understanding the nature of interactions between the translational regulator Pumilio and non-cognate RNA targets and discerning the preference of hPolι for incorporating dGTP when the base of the templating nucleotide is thymine.

His doctoral thesis (July 1996 – Dec 2001) describes the crystallographic analysis of a panel of three murine monoclonal antibodies raised against the same promiscuous peptide antigen PS1 (HQLDPAFGANSTNPD). The comparison of the structure of the antibodies in their bound and unbound state suggests there could be a convergence of both epitope and paratope conformations in an antibody response against a flexible immunodominant epitope. He also carried out a computational analysis of the conformational propensities of native and retro-inverso versions of B-cell and T-cell epitopes. This study showed that conformational and functional mimicry can be achieved through retro-inversion only if the native peptide is present in a linear extended conformation in its functional state. He was also involved in the structure determination of an antibacterial protein from tasar silkworm Antheraea mylitta. In addition, he modeled the complex of the ribonuclease restriction and its rRNA substrate.

== Awards and honors ==
Deepak T. Nair was selected for the Ramanujan Fellowship by the Department of Biotechnology for 2008–2013. He became a member of the Guha Research Conference in 2013. He received the National Bioscience Award for Career Development (N-BIOS Prize) in 2014. The Council of Scientific and Industrial Research awarded him the Shanti Swarup Bhatnagar Prize, one of the highest Indian science awards, in 2017. In 2018, he became a laureate of the Asian Scientist 100 by the Asian Scientist (Recognizing Scientific Excellence With The Asian Scientist 100 – Asian Scientist Magazine). He was inducted as a fellow of the Indian National Science Academy (New Delhi, India) in December 2022. The Haryana state government awarded him the Haryana Vigyan Ratna Award for the year 2024.

== Academic Activities ==
He is the course coordinator and instructor for the Molecular Biology & Genetic Engineering (RCB303) and Methods in Molecular Biology (RCB306) courses at the Regional Centre for Biotechnology. He is part of the Academic Management Committee at RCB and the coordinator of the Data Science module for the practical course conducted for the students of the RCB-BRIC-PhD and the Postgraduate Diploma in Biotechnology (PGDIB) programs.

== Resources for Indian Science ==
At RCB, Deepak T. Nair has participated in the development and management of national resources for Indian Science. He was the primary coordinator of the ESRF access program of RCB, funded by the DBT, that enabled Indian researchers to access the structural biology resources at the European Synchrotron Radiation Facility (https://esrf.rcb.res.in). The program was inaugurated by the then Minister for Science & Technology, Dr. Harsh Vardhan H, in June 2017 and was closed in January 2024. The ESRF access program of the DBT helped nearly 200 researchers- mostly PhD students- from India publish about 240 research papers in international peer-reviewed journals. Deepak is now centrally involved in the management of the Advanced Technology Platform Centre, that provides paid services at the Electron Microscopy, Genomics, Molecular Interactions, Optical Microscopy, and Protein Expression facilities to researchers from all over India (https://atpc.rcb.res.in). He also participated in the development and management of the Indian Biological Data Centre, which will serve as a digital repository for all research data generated in the area of Life Sciences (https://ibdc.dbtindia.gov.in/).
