= Rajani A. Bhisey =

Indian cancer researcher

- Born: 20 January 1941 (age 85)
- Education: University of Bombay
- Known for: Environmental Carcinogenesis and Molecular Epidemiology of Cancer, Occupational Hazards
- Scientific career
- Workplaces: University of Pune

Rajani A. Bhisey (born 20 January 1941) is an Indian scientist. She specializes in the field of environmental carcinogenesis and molecular epidemiology of cancer, occupational hazards.

== Education ==
Bhisey completed her Bachelor of Science degree from University of Bombay and joined the Indian Cancer Research Centre (ICRC), Mumbai, as a research fellow to work for her Master of Science by research degree. She worked on skin carcinogenesis using electron microscope as the main tool, which led to her PhD degree from the University of Bombay in 1974.

== Career ==
Bhisey worked at the University of Pennsylvania as a research assistant and later with Jerome J Freed at the Lankenau Institute for Medical Research on ultra-structural aspects of cell surface of drug resistant haploid frog cells. She established a genetic toxicology laboratory at Cancer Research Institute (CRI) to test mutagenic potential of putative mutagens, conduct toxicology investigations and monitor genetic hazards of environmental agents. Her laboratory monitored genetic damage in bidi rollers and tobacco processors who are chronically exposed to high levels of tobacco dust. She introduced courses in cancer biology and genetic toxicology for Master of Science students and helped train several students and scientists in carcinogenesis and mutagenesis. She is a member of the Monograph Program Panel, International Agency for Research on Cancer, Lyon, France.

== Awards and honors ==
Bhisey has made significant contributions in her field and has been recognized for all her work. Some of her accomplishments are:

- UICC Young Scientist Fellowship
- Lifetime Achievement Award by the Association of Zoologists of India 2007
- Fellow of Maharashtra Academy of Sciences and Indian Academy of Sciences.
