= K. B. Sainis =

Indian immunologist

- Born: 2 October 1949 (age 76); Maharashtra, India
- Education: Savitribai Phule Pune University; Bhabha Atomic Research Centre; Tufts University School of Medicine; University College London
- Known for: Immunobiology research
- Awards: 1994 Shanti Swarup Bhatnagar Prize
- Scientific career
- Fields: Immunology
- Workplaces: Homi Bhabha National Institute; Bhabha Atomic Research Centre

Krishna Balaji Sainis (born 2 October 1949) is an Indian immunologist. He is a former senior professor of Life Sciences at Homi Bhabha National Institute and an elected fellow of the National Academy of Sciences, India. Since 1999, he has served as the Indian representative on the United Nations Scientific Committee on the Effects of Atomic Radiation. The Council of Scientific and Industrial Research, the apex agency of the Government of India for scientific research, awarded him the Shanti Swarup Bhatnagar Prize for Science and Technology for his contributions to medical sciences in 1994.

== Biography ==
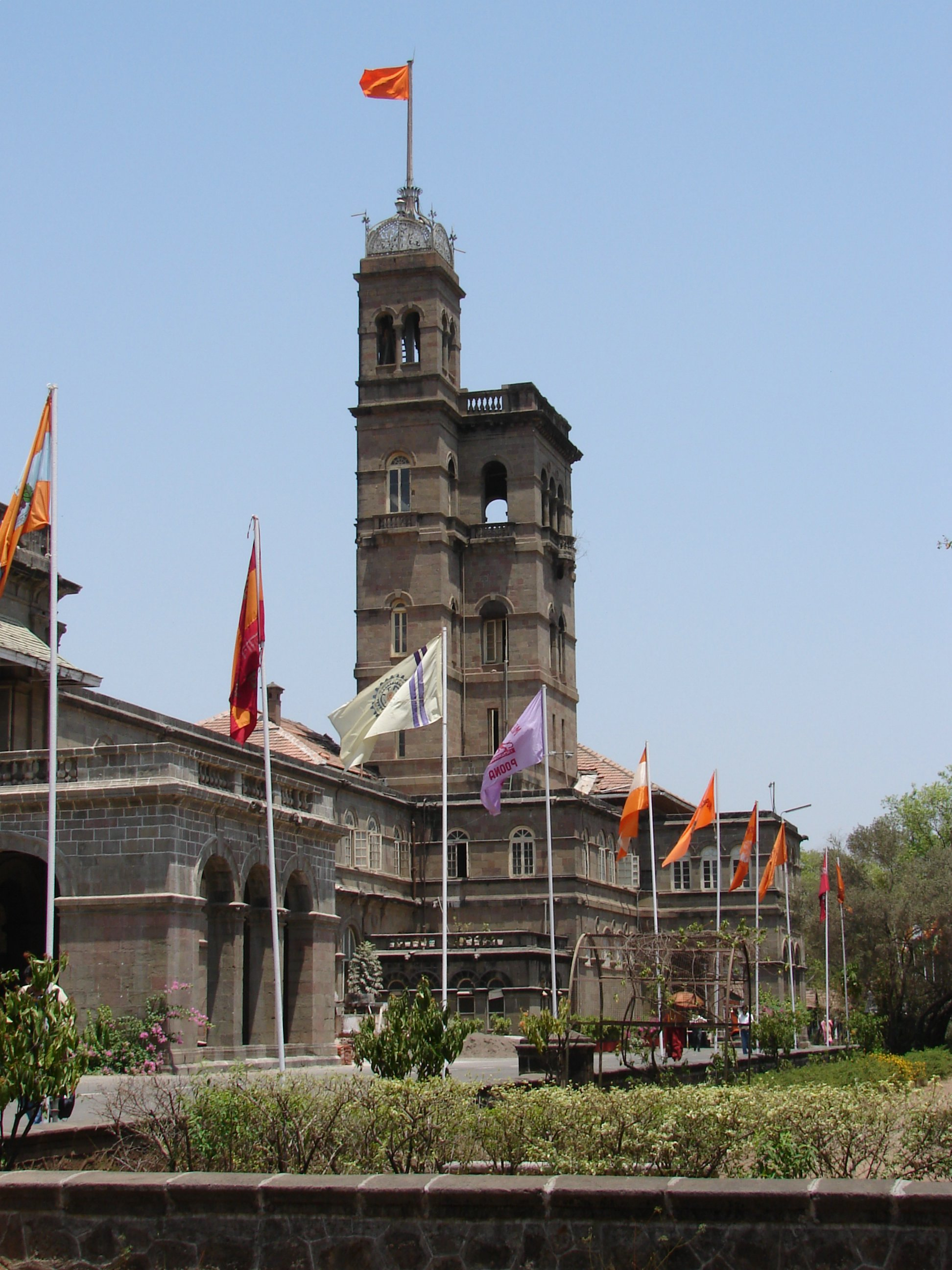
University of Pune

Born on 2 October 1949, K. B. Sainis earned a master's degree in biochemistry (MSc) from Savitribai Phule Pune University and did a one-year course in biology and radiobiology at Bhabha Atomic Research Centre (BARC). Upon completion of the course in 1972, he joined BARC as a Scientific Officer while continuing his doctoral studies at Pune University and secured a PhD in biophysics in 1980. Taking a sabbatical, he did his post-doctoral studies at the New England Medical Centre of Tufts University School of Medicine and, with the assistance of an IAEA fellowship, he completed his studies at University College London at its ICRF Tumor Immunology Unit.

Returning to BARC, he served in many positions, heading the Immunology Section and the Cell Biology Division and serving as the associate director of the Bioscience Group. He became director of the Bio-Medical Group in 2006, with the responsibility of six divisions. During his service at BARC, he has also been working as a faculty at the department of Life Sciences of the Homi Bhabha National Institute where he is a senior professor.

Sainis is married to Jayashree Krishna Sainis, a biochemist, and the family lives in Navi Mumbai.

== Research ==
Sainis' studies in immunobiology have covered how T Cells and their receptors influence immune response to DNA in mycobacterial antigens and lupus nephritis, an autoimmune disease. He headed a group of scientists at BARC who were involved in research on immunomodulators based on plants. His studies have been documented and cited in texts and articles. (Note: Please see Selected bibliography section) He has also written chapters in books published by others.

== Affiliations and memberships ==
Sainis has been associated with two international agencies. He served as president of the Standing Advisory Group on Nuclear Applications (SAGNA) of the International Atomic Energy Agency (IAEA) in 2012, and since 1999 has served as the Indian representative on the United Nations Scientific Committee on the Effects of Atomic Radiation.

Sainis is the president of the Mumbai Immunology Group at Advanced Centre for Treatment, Research and Education in Cancer (ACTREC) of the Tata Memorial Centre and a former vice president of the Maharashtra Academy of Sciences. He is an honorary adviser to the Society for Free Radical Research India (SFRR-India); a member of the Advisory Committee of the National Training Program on Radiation Processing of Food for Food and Quarantine Inspectors & Quality Control Personnel organized by Department of Atomic Energy in association with BARC in February 2013; and a member of the Indian Immunology Society.

He was previously associated with ongoing education programs such as the XVII Training Workshop on Radiation Emergency Preparedness for Medical Officers, the Refresher Course 2013 of the Indian Women Scientists Association, and the AKRUTI Technology Package for Rural Deployment of BARC. He has delivered several invited speeches or keynote addresses and is a reviewer for Hindawi journals.

== Awards and honors ==
The Council of Scientific and Industrial Research awarded Sainis the Shanti Swarup Bhatnagar Prize, one of the highest Indian science awards, in 1994. The National Academy of Sciences, India elected him as a fellow in 2002. He is also an elected fellow of the Maharashtra Academy of Sciences.

== Selected bibliography ==
=== Chapters ===
- K. B. Sainis, Sumariwalla, P. F., Goel, A., Chintalwar, G. J., Sipahimalani, A. T., and Banerji, A. (1997). S.N. Upadhyay (ed.). Immunomodulation - Immunomodulatory properties of stem extracts of Tinospora cordifolia: cell targets and active principles. Narosa Publishing House. p. 155.
- Shakti N. Upadhyay (1999). Immunopharmacology: Strategies for Immunotherapy. CRC Press. pp. 10–. ISBN 978-0-8493-0951-9.
- Vibha Rani; Umesh Chand Singh Yadav (14 November 2014). Free Radicals in Human Health and Disease. Springer. pp. 349–. ISBN 978-81-322-2035-0.

=== Articles ===
- Raghu R, Sharma D, Ramakrishnan R, Khanam S, Chintalwar GJ, Sainis KB (2009). "Molecular events in the activation of B cells and macrophages by a non-microbial TLR4 agonist, G1-4A from Tinospora cordifolia". Immunol. Lett. 23 (1): 60–71. doi:10.1016/j.imlet.2009.02.005. PMID 19428553.
- Deepak Sharma, S. Santosh Kumar, Rahul Checker, Rashmi Raghu, Shazia Khanam, Sunil Krishnan, Krishna Balaji Sainis (2009). "Spatial distribution, kinetics, signaling and cytokine production during homeostasis driven proliferation of CD4+ T cells". Mol. Immunol. 46 (11–12): 2403–2412. doi:10.1016/j.molimm.2009.04.019. PMC 3090723. PMID 19447493.
- Checker R, Sandur SK, Sharma D, Patwardhan RS, Jayakumar S, Kohli V, Sethi G, Aggarwal BB, Sainis KB (2012). "Potent anti-inflammatory activity of ursolic acid, a triterpenoid antioxidant, is mediated through suppression of NF-κB, AP-1 and NF-AT". PLOS ONE. 7 (2) e31318. Bibcode:2012PLoSO...731318C. doi:10.1371/journal.pone.0031318. PMC 3282718. PMID 22363615.
- Patwardhan RS, Checker R, Sharma D, Sandur SK, Sainis KB (2013). "Involvement of ERK-Nrf-2 signaling in ionizing radiation induced cell death in normal and tumor cells". PLOS ONE. 8 (6) e65929. Bibcode:2013PLoSO...865929P. doi:10.1371/journal.pone.0065929. PMC 3679038. PMID 23776571.
- Suryavanshi S, Sharma D, Checker R, Thoh M, Gota V, Sandur SK, Sainis KB (2015). "Amelioration of radiation-induced hematopoietic syndrome by an antioxidant chlorophyllin through increased stem cell activity and modulation of hematopoiesis". Free Radic Biol Med. 85: 56–70. doi:10.1016/j.freeradbiomed.2015.04.007. PMID 25872101.

== See also ==
- Immunotherapy
- Radioactive contamination
