= Ram Shankar Tripathi =

Indian scholar (1929–2019)

- Born: 15 October 1929; Sodalpur, Madhya Pradesh, India
- Died: 18 February 2019 (aged 89)
- Occupations: Scholar of Buddhism, Sanskrit, Pali
- Awards: Padma Shri

Ram Shankar Tripathi (15 October 1929 - 18 February 2019) was an Indian scholar of Buddhism, editor and author of many texts focusing on Buddhist philosophy and Buddhist Tantra. Partly inspired by Jagannath Upadhyaya, Ram Shankar Tripathi had been instrumental in reviving the study of Buddhist texts among Sanskritists in India and abroad, having taught a vast number of scholars from different parts of the world, and through a long-lasting association with traditional Buddhist scholars, from Tibet, Burma and elsewhere. Much of the important editorial work from the CUTS (former CIHTS) in Sarnath was encouraged and supported by Ram Shankar Tripathi's guidance; several prominent Tibetan Lamas, as well as a good number of contemporary Buddhologists, had studied with him.

== Biography ==
He was the former Dean of the Faculty of Śabdavidyā at the Central University of Tibetan Studies. He served as the Head of the Department of Bauddhadarśana at the Sampurnanand Sanskrit University. He is also associated with the Savitribai Phule Pune University, where he was a visiting faculty of Pali and Buddhist Studies. He was the author of several books in Hindi and Sanskrit, including Sautrāntikadarśanam, and edited Dalai Lama's The Path to Tranquility: Daily Meditations, among others. Hevajratantram: With Muktāvalī Pañjikā of Mahāpaṇḍitācārya Ratnākaraśānti and Jainavidyā evaṃ Prākr̥ta are two of his other notable works. His most recent publication is a Sanskrit commentary on the Pramāṇavārttika, Chapter I, offering a comprehensive guide to Dharmakīrti's difficult verses, and being more accessible than the ancient commentaries.

On 18 February 2019, he died at the age of 90.

== Awards ==
The Government of India awarded him the fourth highest civilian honour of the Padma Shri, in 2009, for his contributions to Literature and Education.

== Bibliography ==
- Ram Shankar Tripathi; Gokulacandra Jaina (1987). Jainavidyā evaṃ Prākr̥ta. Sampurnanand Sanskrit University. p. 345.
- Ram Shankar Tripathi (1990). Sautrantikadarsanam. Central University of Tibetan Studies. p. 682. ISBN 9788187127734.
- Ram Shankar Tripathi; Thakur Sain Negi (2001). Hevajratantram: With Muktavali Panjika of Mahapanditacarya Ratnakarasanti. Central Institute of Higher Tibetan Studies. p. 335.
- Dalai Lama (2012). Ram Shankar Tripathi (ed.). The Path to Tranquility: Daily Meditations. Translated by Thuptan Chhogdup. Penguin Books India. ISBN 9780143418023.

== See also ==
- List of Savitribai Phule Pune University people
