= Dinakar Mashnu Salunke =

Indian immunologist and structural biologist

Dinakar M. Salunke
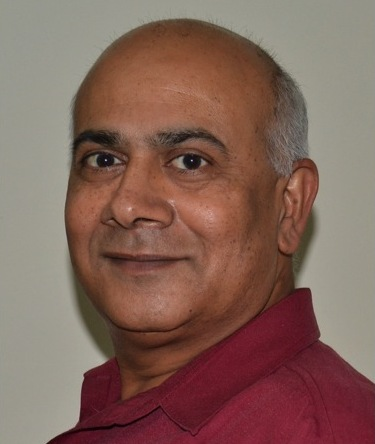
- Born: Belgaum, Karnataka, India
- Education: Indian Institute of Science
- Known for: Immunology and Structural biology
- Awards: Shanti Swarup Bhatnagar Prize for Science and Technology(2000)
- Scientific career
- Fields: Biological Sciences
- Workplaces: International Centre for Genetic Engineering and Biotechnology, Regional Centre for Biotechnology, National Institute of Immunology (NII)
- Doctoral advisor: Prof. M. Vijayan

Dinakar Masanu Salunke is an immunologist and structural biologist. Presently, he is the Director of International Centre for Genetic Engineering and Biotechnology (ICGEB) New Delhi. Earlier he was the Executive Director of newly established Regional Centre for Biotechnology (RCB), an institution jointly set up by Department of Biotechnology (India) and UNESCO at Faridabad. He is the recipient of Shanti Swarup Bhatnagar Prize for Science and Technology in the category of biological sciences (year 2000) and Fellow of all major science academies in India.

== Education and personal life ==
Salunke was born and brought up at Belgaum, Karnataka, India. He earned his B.Sc. in Physics, Mathematics and Statistics (1976), and M.Sc. in Physics (1978) from Karnataka University, Dharwad. After completion of his M.Sc. with first class distinction, he joined Prof. M. Vijayan for his Ph.D. degree at Molecular Biophysics Unit, Indian Institute of Science, Bangalore. He did his postdoctoral research at Brandeis University, Waltham, Massachusetts, United States (year 1985–88).

Salunke is married to Madhuri and the couple has one daughter. They live in Delhi.

== Professional career ==
Salunke joined the National Institute of Immunology (NII), Delhi in 1988 as a staff scientist and worked there until 2015 at (NII), Delhi. From Nov 2015 onwards, Dr. Salunke nurtured the International Centre for Genetic Engineering and Biotechnology as its first director. Previously, he headed the newly established Regional Centre for Biotechnology, an institution of education, training and research, as its first executive director (years 2010–2015). He has also served as the executive director of the Translational Health Science and Technology Institute (THSTI), Delhi (years 2010–2011). For more than 3 decades, he has extensively worked in the field of immunology involving structural biology of immune recognition, molecular mimicry and allergy.

== Awards and recognitions ==
Salunke has been awarded Shanti Swarup Bhatnagar Prize for Science and Technology (Category –Biological Sciences, Year 2000) from Council of Scientific and Industrial Research (CSIR). He is fellow of all the 3 major science academies in India e.g. Indian Academy of Sciences (IAS), Bangalore; Indian National Science Academy (INSA), Delhi; National Academy of Sciences, India (NASI), Allahabad. He was recently elected as Fellow of The World Academy of Sciences (TWAS).

Other achievements include the GN Ramachandran Gold Medal for Excellence in Biological Science & Technology from Council of Scientific and Industrial Research, India (2011)
