= Mini Menon =

Indian journalist and author

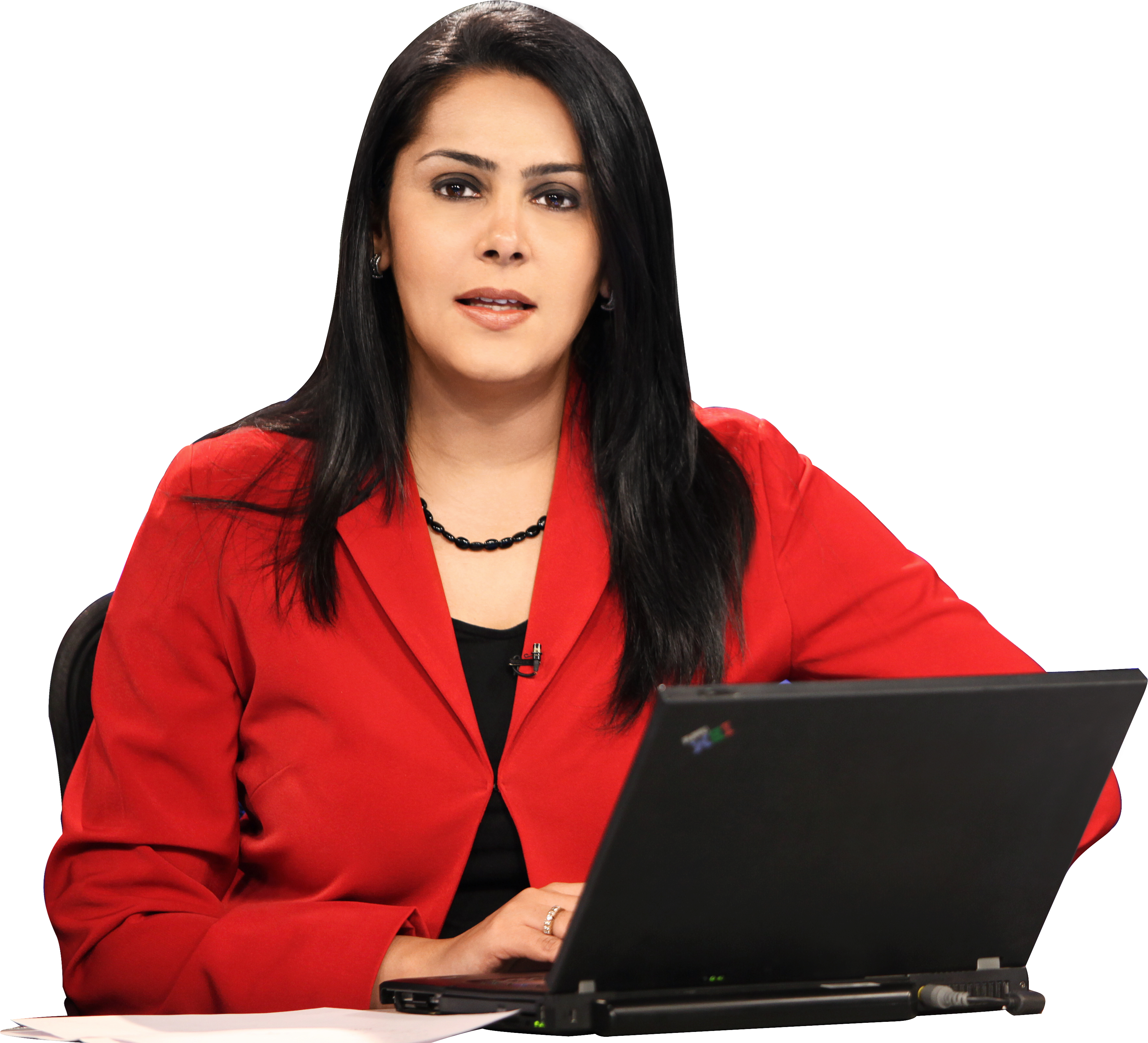
- Education: Graduation St. Stephen's College, Delhi; Masters in Communication Research, University of Pune
- Occupation: Co-Founder at Peepul Tree World
- Website: https://www.peepultree.world/

Mini Menon is an Indian journalist, author, and co-founder of Peepul Tree World. She was also the co-founder and editor of Live History India (now Peepul Tree Stories).

Menon was formerly the Executive Editor of Bloomberg TV India, where she was in charge of news and feature shows. She has also reported on political, economic, and business news. She has won awards for her work as a news anchor and journalist. In 2013, Impact magazine named Menon of the 10 most influential women in Indian marketing, advertising, and media.

== Biography ==
Menon was born in Jammu. Her father was in the army, so her early years were spent across India as her father (the late Lt. Gen. P. E. Menon) was posted in different parts of the country.

Menon graduated from St Stephen’s College, Delhi, with a degree in History. She did her Masters in Communication Studies at the University of Pune. In 1996, she won the Femina Miss India Asia Pacific title after her second year in college. In 2001, she won the Chevening scholarship and went to study broadcast journalism in the UK.

=== Career ===
Menon is co-founder of Peepul Tree World, an e-commerce company focused on Indian artisanal hand-crafted products for the home. Before that, she co-founded Live History India, a digital media company focusing on stories from Indian history (now Peepul Tree Stories).

Menon first started working at TVi and then moved on to Star TV Network. She was the news anchor for Goodlife on CNBC TV18 in 2004.

At Bloomberg TV India, Menon presented popular series, "Inside India's Best Known Companies", where she interviewed India's leading businessmen and CEOs. She also led feature programming and was responsible for creating cutting-edge shows like "The Pitch" and "Assignment" and award-winning documentaries like "In Focus".

In 2013, Menon published Riding the Wave, a book on seven of India's leading businessmen. The book covers how these businessmen took advantage of the opening up of the Indian economy to build businesses and shape their industries.

In 2019 and 2020 Mini also edited the Quirky History series which was published by HarperCollins.

=== Awards and recognition ===
In 2008–2009, Menon was named Best Business News Anchor by the Indian Broadcast Federation. She also received the Zee Astitva Award for Journalism, the Rajiv Gandhi Award for Excellence as a Young Achiever, and the 1996 Miss India Asia Pacific.

=== Initiatives and associations ===
2012: invited to be a member of CII’s National Committee on Marketing; 2014: took over as the Regional Chairperson of CII's Indian Women Network, IWN.

In 2014, Menon joined the National Advisory Board of Enactus.

2022: Menon paired with Anish Williams to launch Peepultree.world, an e-commerce company focused on hand-crafted artisanal products from India.
