= Anupama Jain =

Indian writer and teacher

- Born: Gurgaon, India
- Education: Pune University

Anupama Jain is an Indian writer and teacher based out of Gurgaon. She is the founding member of Senior School Moms and a blogger. Anupama is the author of four books and twelve anthologies across multiple genres. One of her publications holds a LIMCA record as India’s first Composite Novel.

== Background ==
Anupama holds a MCA degree from Pune University, Pune, India. She lives in Gurgaon with her husband, son and daughter. Anupama also runs classes for children in Gurgaon.

== Writer ==
Anupama is a contributing author to Chronicles of Urban Nomads. She is the author of the novel, When Padma Bani Paula which was listed as one of five best books, fiction 2018 by readwriteinspire.com.

She contributed to Crossed & Knotted, India’s first composite novel, 2016 that entered the LIMCA Book of Records. She also contributed to When They Spoke as well as Mock Stalk & Quarrel – all published by Readomania. In 2018, she contributed to When Women Speak Up an e-book of inspiring stories published by Women’s Web.

Anupama was also the Finalist, Orange Flower 2017 Creative Writing Award.

She was listed as one of the 10 Indian women bloggers, a feminist must follow, by Women’s Web in July 2017. She was the winner of the Popular Choice Orange Flower Award for Humour, 2018, awarded by Women's Web. Her book was also listed as one of The Best books of 2018 by Read Write Inspire.

She is A-Z Blogging Challenge 2017, 2016 survivor. Her short story on marital morass was one of the top 14 blogs of 2017 out of the 18,000+ blogs published annually at mycity4kids.com.

She writes a regular piece at readomania.com – ‘AJ Wants to Know’ a satirical take on the quirky world around.

Anupama is the Founder & Admin of ' SeniorSchoolMoms' which won the Orange Flower Award 2021, for Best Facebook Groups.

== Books ==
=== Author ===
- Jain, Anupama (2018-04-16). When Padma Bani Paula. Readomania. ASIN B07C7RJCWQ.
- Jain, Anupama (2020-05-08). Masala Mix: Potpourri of Shorts. Readomania. ASIN B088DFQ74L.
- Jain, Anupama (2021-12-28). Kings, Saviours & Scoundrels: Timeless Tales from Katha Sarita Sagara. Readomania. ASIN B09PF4K4LJ.
- Jain, Anupama (2023-12-11). When Padma Bani Wifey. India: Readomania. ISBN 978-9391800697.

=== Contributor ===
- Jain, Anupama; Menon, Deepti; Mukherjee, Bhaswar; Navalgund, Niranjan; Pal, Ayan (2014). Chronicles of Urban Nomads. Readomania. ISBN 978-8192997506.
- Jain, Anupama; Mukherjee, Bhaswar; Menon, Deepti; Pal, Ayan; Shankar, Bhuvaneshwari; Sopory, Avanti (2015-02-09). Basu, Sutapa (ed.). Crossed & Knotted: India's First Composite Novel. Readomania. ASIN B00TFRO8M0.
- Chakraborty, Aashisha; Ghosh, Tanushree; Jain, Anupama; Tabrez, Radhika Maira (2017-01-29). Ganguly, Indrani (ed.). Mock, Stalk & Quarrel: A collection of Satirical Tales. Readomania. ASIN B01MRBGU4K.
- Jain, Anupama; Menon, Deepti; Pal, Ayan; Shankar, Bhuvaneshwari; Tabrez, Radhika Maira (2016). Banerjee, Arpita (ed.). When They Spoke. Readomania. ISBN 9789385854057.
- Jain, Anumpana; Lekhak, Vartika Sharma; Prabhakar, Roopa; Raj, Rashmi (2017-12-27). When Women Speak Up: A Women's Web Collection of inspiring stories. Amazon Digital Services. ASIN B07896SH5L.
- Barua, Proyashi; Basu, Ushasi Ben; Ghosh, Rituparna; Menon, Deepti; Jain, Anupama; Mukherjee, Bhaswar; Mukherjee, Sourabh; Pal, Ayan; Saraf, Mira; Sarat, Archana; Singh, Harshali (2020-05-31). The Readomania Book of Horror. Readomania. ASIN B089J9H4KX.
- Menon, Deepti; Gulati, Vasudha Chandna; Jain, Anupama; Sengupta, Sinjini; Shankar, Bhuvaneshwari; Singh, Harshali (2020-07-20). The Readomania Book of Folk Tales. Readomania. ASIN B08DDDR538.
- Basu, Usahsi Ben; Chakraborty, Aashisha; Ghosh, Rituparna; Ghosh, Tanushree; Gulati, Vasudha Chandna; Jain, Anupama; Mukherjee, Bhaswar; Narayanan, Hari Ram; Saraf, Mira (2020-07-26). The Readomania Book of Crime Thrillers. Readomania. ASIN B08DP6X3M6.
- Chakraborty, Aashisha; Ghosh, Rituparna; Gulati, Vasudha Chadna; Jain, Anupama; Menon, Deepti; Mukherjee, Bhaswar; Pal, Ayan; Sengupta, Sinjini; Shankar, Bhuvaneshwari (2020-08-17). The Readomania Book of Romance. Readomania. ASIN B08G4YMDN8.
- Gulati, Vasudha Chandna; Jain, Anupama; Singh, Harshali; Tabrez, Radhika Maira (2020-08-26). Better Parenting for the Children of Tomorrow: Secrets to Ace the Pandemic Times. Readomania. ASIN B08GSSCBBS.
- Menon, Deepti; Singh, Harshali, eds. (2022-01-08). Remnants of Loss: Poems for Your Soul. Readomania. ASIN B09Q25NGY1.
- De nee Chatterjee, Nandita; Jain, Anupama; Joshi, Monalisa; Menon, Deepti; Singh, Harshali (2022-05-23). Choudhary, Deepak K (ed.). Songs of a Mermaid ( Tales of Urban Women). New Delhi, India: Chrysanthemum Chronicles. ISBN 978-8195430741.
