= M. G. Venkata Raghavan =

Indian singer

Venkata Raghavan M. G.
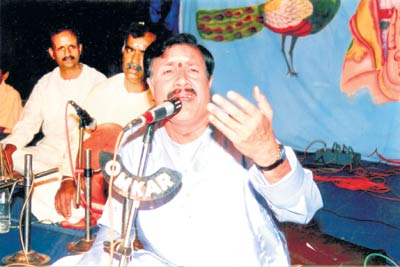

Background information
- Born: 14 May 1956 (age 70)
- Genres: Carnatic music
- Occupation: Vocalist of Indian classical music
- Years active: 1956-present

Mysore Govinda Rao Venkata Raghavan (born 14 May 1956) is an Indian Carnatic vocalist, playback singer, composer and actor. He was awarded the Rajyotsava Prashasthi for his contribution towards Carnatic music.

== Early life ==
Venkata Raghavan was born on 14 May 1956. His father was M.G. Govinda Rao, a schoolteacher, and his mother, P. S. Savithramma, was a musician from Mysore. His mother introduced him to Carnatic music at the age of four and he gave his first recital when aged nine. Three years later, he sang the 72 Melakartha Raagas (major scales) of Carnatic music.

Thereafter, he entered the traditional gurukula system, being tutored in Madras by M. Balamuralikrishna for nearly five years. The Madras Music Academy and Sangeet Natak Akademi provided him with merit scholarships.

Raghavan also graduated in science and engineering.

== Innovations ==
Raghavan has revived several rarely heard difficult raagas, such as Nishada, Gamanashrama, Vakulabharana, Kanakambari and Jhenkaaradhvani. He has also created or evolved new raagas, including Kusumdharani, Khadyotakaanthi, Komalanagi, Vageeshwari Laasaki and Pranayaraagini.

As a composer, he has created music for the Ashtapadias of Jayadeva, Daasa Saahithya, Vachanas of Shiva- Sharans, and the lyrics of many classical and modern poets in various languages, like, D. V. G, AdiShankaraacharya, Annamaacharya and Naareyanayathi of Kaivara. He has also transliterated and sang the Daasa Saahithya in Telugu, Malayalam and Tamil.

In addition, Raghavan has sung in films. These include Adi Shankara, the world's first Sanskrit movie, Madhwacharya, Ramanujacharya, Shanthala and Krishnavathara. Prabhath Kalavidaru's ballets like Krishna vijayanthi, Srinivas-kalyana and others.

== Awards and honours ==
The state of Karnataka recognised Raghavan with its Rajyotsava award in 2008.

Other awards, medals and prizes won by Raghavan since his childhood include the Presidential National AIR award (1977) and titles such as Gaana Gandharva, Naada Hamsa, Gaana Vishradha, Gaana Kala Saraswathi and Basavanagudi Rathna,

The Government of India awarded Raghavan a Senior Fellowship and the Government of Karnataka appointed him as a Guru for Carnatic music under the Guru–Shishya Parampara in 2000. He has also been a guest lecturer at Bangalore University for eight years.

Raghavan has completed a work on the mathematical rhythmic patterns and is working on an exhaustive treatise on the raagas.

== Selected compositions ==
Raghavan has produced several documentaries, related to music and culture for television. These include:

- Mysore Vasudevacharya
- Thyagaraja Manasa Rama
- Devi and Dikshitar

He has produced, directed the music, sung and acted in his own serial Anthahpurageethegali (the works of D.V. Gundappa). He also composed and sang the music to a documentary on the national television network, produced by the National Institute of Linguistic Studies, on the complete works and life of the national poet, D. V. Gundappa.

== See also ==
- List of Carnatic singers
