= Aparna V. Huzurbazar =

American statistician

- Education: Claremont McKenna College; University of Colorado Boulder; Colorado State University (PhD)
- Occupation: Statistician
- Spouse: Brian J. Williams
- Father: V. S. Huzurbazar
- Relatives: Snehalata V. Huzurbazar (sister)

Aparna V. Huzurbazar is an American statistician known for her work using graphical models to understand time-to-event data. She is the author of a book on this subject, Flowgraph Models for Multistate Time-to-Event Data (Wiley, 2004).

Huzurbazar is a research scientist at the Los Alamos National Laboratory. She graduated in 1988 with two bachelor's degrees from two different universities: one in mathematics from Claremont McKenna College, and another in aerospace engineering from the University of Colorado Boulder. She completed a Ph.D. in statistics in 1994 at Colorado State University. Her dissertation, supervised by Ronald W. Butler, was Prediction in Stochastic Networks. She took a faculty position at the University of Florida, but then moved to the University of New Mexico in 1996, and moved again to Los Alamos in 2007.

Huzurbazar is the daughter of noted Indian statistician V. S. Huzurbazar and the sister of noted statistician Snehalata V. Huzurbazar; her husband, Brian J. Williams of Los Alamos, is also a statistician. All four are Fellows of the American Statistical Association; Aparna was elected as a Fellow in 2008, her father in 1983, Williams in 2015, and her sister in 2017. Huzurbazar was also elected as a member of the International Statistical Institute in 2006.
