= Snehalata V. Huzurbazar =

American statistician

- Born: Ames, Iowa, U.S.
- Education: Grinnell College; Vanderbilt University; Colorado State University (PhD)
- Occupation: Statistician
- Father: V. S. Huzurbazar
- Relatives: Aparna V. Huzurbazar (sister)

Snehalata V. Huzurbazar is an American statistician, known for her work in statistical genetics, and also interested in applications of statistics to geology. She is a professor of biostatistics, and chair of the biostatistics department, at the West Virginia University School of Public Health.

Huzurbazar was born in Ames, Iowa. In 1984, she graduated from Grinnell College with an independently designed major that combined economics, history, sociology, and Spanish, with a year off in Zagreb learning Croatian. She earned a master's degree in economics from Vanderbilt University in 1988, with V. Kerry Smith as her advisor, and completed her Ph.D. in statistics in 1992 at Colorado State University. Her dissertation, supervised by Ronald W. Butler, was Saddlepoint Approximations in Multivariate Analysis. She joined the department of statistics of the University of Georgia in 1992, moved to the University of Wyoming in 1995, was on leave there from 2012 to 2014 while working as deputy director of the Statistical and Applied Mathematical Sciences Institute in Research Triangle Park, North Carolina, and moved to West Virginia University as chair in 2017.

Huzurbazar is the daughter of noted Indian statistician V. S. Huzurbazar and the sister of noted statistician Aparna V. Huzurbazar, whose husband, Brian J. Williams, is also a statistician. All four are Fellows of the American Statistical Association; Snehalata was elected as a Fellow in 2017, her father in 1983, her sister in 2008, and Williams in 2015.
