= Regional Centre for Biotechnology =

Indian research institute

- Type: Government
- Established: July 14, 2006; 20 years ago
- Affiliations: UNESCO; Department of Biotechnology
- Chairperson: Secretary, Department of Biotechnology, Government of India
- Director: Dr. Arvind Sahu
- Location: Faridabad, Haryana, India
- Abbreviation: RCB
- Website: website

The Regional Centre for Biotechnology (RCB) is an autonomous institution of education, training and research established under the auspices of United Nations Educational, Scientific and Cultural Organization (UNESCO) and Department of Biotechnology (DBT, India). The Parliament has passed the Regional Centre for Biotechnology Bill, 2016 to provide statutory status to the existing institution. Dr. Arvind Sahu is the executive director of RCB.

== Background ==
The Government of India and UNESCO signed a Memorandum of Understanding (MoU) on 14 July 2006 to establish RCB. The centre is now recognized as a "Category II Centre" by "the principles and guidelines for the establishment and functioning of UNESCO Institutes and Centres". Following approval from the Union Cabinet, the centre became operational from its interim campus at Gurgaon, Haryana from 20 April 2009.

== Research areas ==
RCB engages in contemporary research at the interface of disciplines constituting biotechnology in its broadest definition. Research programmes aim to integrate science, engineering, medicine and agriculture in biotechnology and emphasize on their relevance to the regional societies.

A broad range of research areas planned include:

- Biomedical Sciences
- Molecular and Cellular Biology
- Bioengineering and Devices
- Biophysics, Biochemistry and Structural Biology
- Climate science, Agriculture and Environment
- Biotechnology Regulatory Affairs, IPR and Policy

== Academics and training ==
=== Multidisciplinary doctoral programme ===
Has been instituted for students who have completed masters in any relevant discipline of natural sciences, medicine, engineering and other related sciences. RCB recruits Junior Research Fellowships (JRFs) twice during an academic year and already mentors 31 Research Fellows.

=== Young Investigator (YI) Post-Doctoral Programme ===
(RCB-YI award) has been initiated to nurture outstanding recent PhDs with innovative ideas and the drive to pursue novel discoveries under the mentorship of RCB faculty. RCB-YI award has been instituted for both Indian and Foreign nationals on the competitive basis with initial appointment for three years which is extendable on rigorous review for additional two years.

=== Short-term training programmes ===
These are conducted at RCB by inducting post-graduate students of science from various universities/institutions/colleges to carry out their project/ dissertation work towards partial fulfillment of their postgraduate degrees.

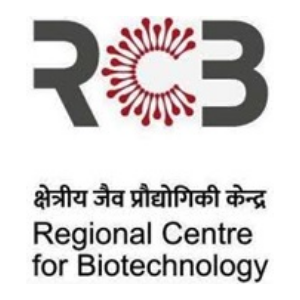

=== Advanced workshops/training ===
Courses are arranged by RCB periodically throughout the year, covering various frontier areas that could be broadly classified under biotechnology keeping in view the multi-disciplinary nature of the subject. During the week-long workshops, expert in-house and invited faculty deliver lectures and provide hands-on training to expose the participants to contemporary science/technology and explore their utility for addressing research problems in specific scientific areas.

== Research facilities ==
RCB has established facilities in its interim campus at Gurgaon where it is functioning. Centre is expected to expand further when it moves to its permanent campus in Faridabad, within the NCR Biotech Science Cluster, later this year. RCB has established major specialized facilities that include: high resolution optical imaging (Atomic Force Microscopy, Confocal Microscopy, Fluorescence Microscopy), synthesis chemistry facilities, Protein sequencer, Protein purification systems, biophysical (Isothermal Titration Calorimetry, Differential Scanning Calorimetry, Circular Dichroism, SPR, NMR, FTIR, Dynamic Light Scattering), structural biology (Crystallization Robotics, X-ray Diffraction), proteomics (ABSciEx Triple TOF 5600), flow cytometry, plant, bacterial and animal cell/ tissue culture facilities, tissue sectioning and insect culture facilities.

In addition, researchers at RCB have access to the Advanced Technology Platform Center (ATPC) of the Biotech Science Cluster Faridabad. The ATPC already houses an operational flow cytometry and proteomics facilities. Other high-end facilities planned to be operational in near future include complete optical imaging, electron microscopy and next-generation sequencing.

== Indian Biological Data Centre ==
Department of Biotechnology announces the launch of first Indian Biological Data Centre (IBDC) at Regional Centre for Biotechnology, Faridabad. A national facility to store, manage, archive and distribute all kind of biological data.

== Partnerships ==
Towards fulfilling its mandate, RCB is collaborating with various national and international institutions of repute. The partnerships are meant for exchange of ideas, information sharing, training, networking, conducting scientific colloquia, workshops, academic exchange programmes and student study visits within (and outside) India and for students of the Asia-Pacific region.

RCB and National Institute of Advanced Industrial Science and Technology (AIST), Japan announced a partnership to further capacity building initiatives in bio-imaging and biotechnology. The agreement offers an excellent opportunity for both the institutions in capacity building, training and research collaborations, benefitting young scientists not only in India and Japan, but also from the UNESCO member countries in the Asia-Pacific and SAARC regions. In its continuing effort to fulfill the core mandate, RCB is actively engaged in a range of research and related activities in partnership with other academic institutions, which form part of the NCR Biotech Science Cluster, Faridabad. Shared facilities such as Advanced Technology Platform Centre (ATPC), and Bioincubators (supported by Biotechnology Industry Research Assistance Council (BIRAC)), which is meant to support the budding biotechnology entrepreneurs, are being established.

== Governance ==
RCB is an institution of international importance in biotechnology, education, training and research. The Board of Governors (BoG), composed of eminent scientists and specialists in the field of biotechnology, representing Government of India and UNESCO are responsible for the governance of the Centre. The Programme Advisory Committee (PAC), composed of experts within India and abroad, provide support and guidance for the centre's education, training and research programmes. On behalf of the Governing body, the Executive Director executes policies and functions of the Centre with the guidance of a duly constituted Executive Committee.
