= Maharashtra Academy of Sciences =

Maharashtra Academy of Sciences is a learned society whose head offices are located in Pune, Maharashtra, India. MAS is an exemplary organisation located near Kashele in the Karjat Tribal Block about 100 km east of Bombay.

The society was established in 1976 with the aim of promoting science and examining the scientific and technological issues affecting the state. Dr. Homi Sethna, Chairman of Indian Atomic Energy Commission, became the first President of the society. Since inception, Maharashtra Academy of Sciences has enabled the socio-economic progress and modernization of Maharashtra State via promotion and application of science and technology. MAS is an exemplary organisation located near Kashele in the Karjat Tribal Block about 100 km east of Bombay.

Fellows of the society include many eminent Indian scientists such as Ratan Kumar Sinha, Srikumar Banerjee, Anil Kakodkar, Raghunath Mashelkar, Jayant Narlikar, Homi Sethna, Man Mohan Sharma, and various distinguished scientists from elite institutes such as BARC, NCL and ICT, Mumbai (Previously UDCT). Also included in this list are NRI fellows, who are renowned for their significant contributions to advancements in science and technology, such as Mukund Chorghade, Mahesh Kulkarni, Nitin Parekh and Deodatta Shenai-Khatkhate from U.S.A., and Safia Munshi from Canada. The complete directory of Fellows is available at the academy's website.
