= C. Kumar N. Patel =

Indian-American electrical engineer

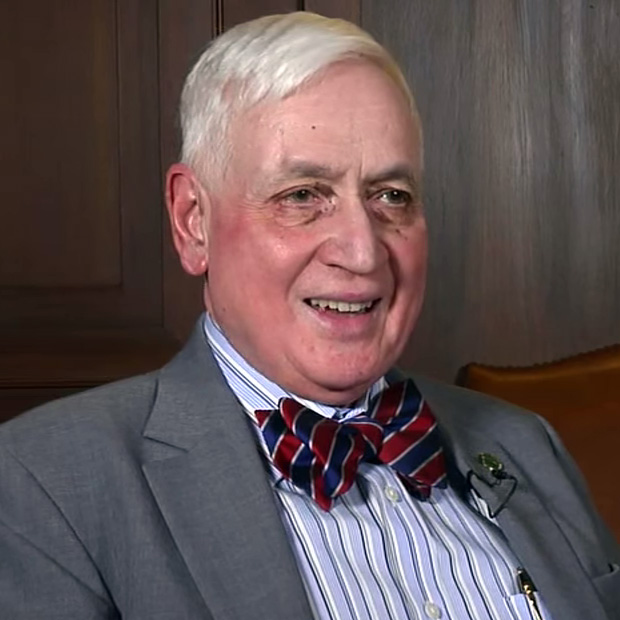
- Born: 2 July 1938 (age 88); Baramati, Bombay Presidency, British India
- Education: College of Engineering, Pune (B.E.); Stanford University (M.S., PhD)
- Awards: Stuart Ballantine Medal (1968); IEEE Medal of Honor (1989) National Medal of Science (1996)
- Scientific career
- Fields: Electrical engineering
- Workplaces: University of California, Los Angeles

Chandra Kumar Naranbhai Patel (born 2 July 1938) is an Indian-American electrical engineer. He is best known for developing the carbon dioxide laser in 1963, now widely used in industrial cutting and dermatology.

Patel was born in Baramati, India, and received a Bachelor of Engineering (B.E.) degree from the Government College of Engineering, Pune and an M.S. and PhD in electrical engineering from Stanford University in 1959 and 1961. Patel joined Bell Laboratories the same year and subsequently became Executive Director of the Research, Materials Science, Engineering and Academic Affairs Division at AT&T Bell Laboratories in Murray Hill, New Jersey. Patel's discovery of the laser action in 1963 on the rotational–vibrational transitions of carbon dioxide and his discovery in 1964 of efficient vibrational energy transfer between molecules, led to a series of experiments which demonstrated that the carbon dioxide laser was capable of very high continuous-wave and pulsed power output at very high conversion efficiencies. From 1993–1999, Patel served as vice chancellor for research at the University of California, Los Angeles, where he is also a Professor Emeritus of physics and electrical engineering.

Patel discussing his career and his invention of the carbon dioxide laser.

In 1996, President Bill Clinton awarded Patel the National Medal of Science, "for his fundamental contributions to quantum electronics and invention of the carbon dioxide laser, which have had significant impact on industrial, scientific, medical, and defense applications." In addition to the carbon dioxide laser, he also developed the "spin-flip" infrared Raman laser and was inducted into the National Inventors Hall of Fame (NIHF) in 2012.

Patel currently holds 36 U.S. patents relating to lasers and laser applications. He is a member of the National Academy of Engineering and the National Academy of Sciences, and a Fellow of the American Academy of Arts and Sciences, the American Association for the Advancement of Science, the American Physical Society, the IEEE, the Optical Society of America, the Laser Institute of America, the American Society of Laser Medicine, and a Senior Fellow of the California Council on Science and Technology.

In 2018 C. Kumar N. Patel became an Honorary Member of the American Laser Study Club which a year later named an award in his honor.

== Awards and honors ==
- Adolph Lomb Medal (1966)
- Stuart Ballantine Medal (1968)
- Fellow, American Academy of Arts and Sciences (1976)
- Member, National Academy of Engineering (1978)
- Charles Hard Townes Medal (1982)
- Frederic Ives Medal (1989)
- IEEE Medal of Honor (1989)
- National Medal of Science (1996)
