= V. S. Huzurbazar =

Indian statistician

Vasant S. Huzurbazar
- Born: 15 September 1919; Kolhapur State, British India (now Maharashtra, India)
- Died: 15 November 1991 (aged 72)
- Education: University of Cambridge, University of Mumbai, Banaras Hindu University
- Awards: Adams Prize (1960)
- Scientific career
- Fields: Statistics
- Workplaces: University of Denver, University of Pune, Gauhati University
- Doctoral advisor: Harold Jeffreys

Vasant Shankar Huzurbazar (15 September 1919 – 15 November 1991) was an Indian statistician from Kolhapur. Huzurbazar was the founder head of the department of statistics, University of Pune from 1953 to 1976. He was a visiting professor for two years to the Iowa State University in 1962. From 1976 to 1979, he was visiting professor of statistics at the University of Manitoba. From 1979 to 1991, he was professor at University of Denver, Colorado until his death.

In 1974, Huzurbazar was awarded the Padma Bhushan by the Government of India for his contributions to the field of statistics. In 1983 he was elected as a Fellow of the American Statistical Association.

== Career ==
Huzurbazar completed his high school from Rajaram High school, Kolhapur. He did his B.Sc. from University of Mumbai and M.Sc. in statistics from Banaras Hindu University during 1940–1941. Huzurbazar earned his Ph.D. in statistics from University of Cambridge in 1950; his advisor was Harold Jeffreys. Huzurbazar worked at Gauhati University, Lucknow University and at the Bureau of Economics and Statistics of Government of Bombay.

== Personal life ==
Huzurbazar's two daughters, Snehalata V. Huzurbazar and Aparna V. Huzurbazar, both became notable statisticians. He was the maternal uncle of noted Indian astrophysicist, Jayant Narlikar.

== Works ==
- Vasant S. Huzurbazar (1 September 1976). Sufficient Statistics. Taylor & Francis. ISBN 978-0-8247-6296-4.
