= Padmanabhan Balaram =

Indian biochemist

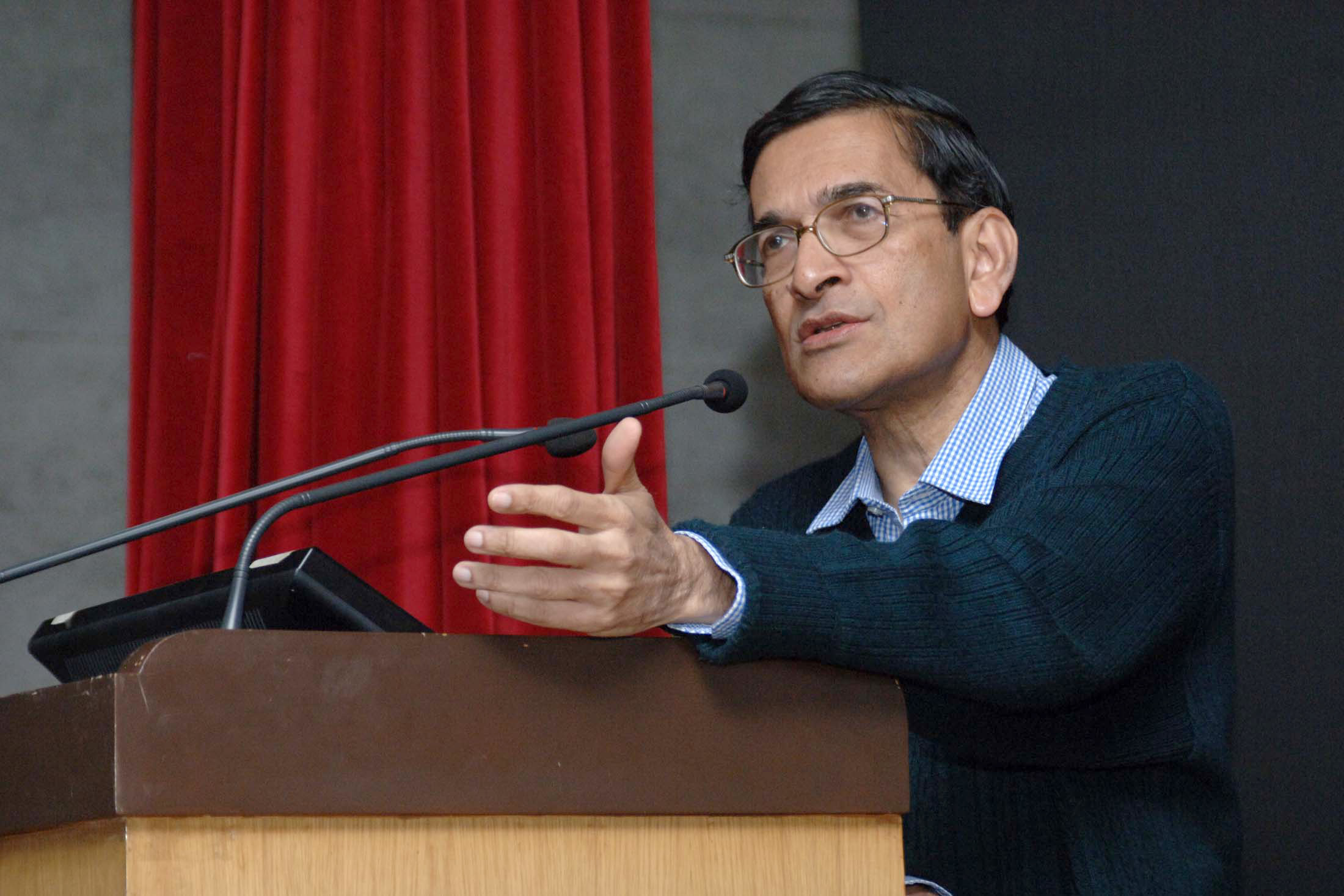
- Education: University of Pune; Indian Institute of Technology, Kanpur; Carnegie Mellon University
- Awards: Padma Bhushan
- Scientific career
- Fields: Biochemistry
- Workplaces: Indian Institute of Science, Indian Statistical Institute
- Doctoral advisor: Aksel A. Bothner-By

Padmanabhan Balaram is an Indian biochemist and a former director of the Indian Institute of Science in Bangalore, India. He is a recipient of the third highest Indian civilian honour of Padma Bhushan (2014) as well as the TWAS Prize (1994). He has been conferred the 2021 R. Bruce Merrifield Award by the American Peptide Society. On September 15, 2026, he was elected President of the Indian Statistical Institute for the 2026–28 term.

== Education ==
Balaram received his bachelor's degree in chemistry from Fergusson College, University of Pune followed by a master's degree from the Indian Institute of Technology, Kanpur and his PhD from Carnegie Mellon University with Aksel A. Bothner-By. During his PhD, Balaram studied the use of negative Nuclear Overhauser effect signals as probes of macromolecular conformations. After a postdoctoral stint at Harvard University with Nobel laureate Robert Burns Woodward, where he on the synthesis of the antibiotic erythromycin, Balaram returned to the Indian Institute of Science, where he has been ever since as a faculty member in the Molecular Biophysics Unit. He presently holds a Chaired Professorship at the National Center for Biological Sciences, Bangalore.

== Research ==
Balaram's main area of research has been the investigation of the structure, conformation, and biological activity of designed and natural peptides. To do this, he has extensively used techniques such as Nuclear Magnetic Resonance spectroscopy, Infrared spectroscopy, and Circular Dichroism, along with X-ray crystallography. He has been a major contributor to the evaluation of factors influencing the folding and conformations of designed peptides, and has investigated structural elements playing a key role in the formation of secondary structural motifs such as helices, beta turns, and sheets. Along with Isabella Karle, a frequent collaborator, he has also pioneered the use of alpha-amino isobutyric acid to induce and retain helicity and constrain peptide conformations.

Balaram has authored more than 400 research papers, and is a fellow of the Indian National Science Academy.

He was the editor of the journal Current Science until June 2013.

== Controversies and criticism ==
In Jan 27, 2025 on direction of 71st City Civil and Sessions Court, Sadashivanagara Police Station of Bengaluru City Police booked Former director of IISc Padmanabhan Balaram including 15 other members under Scheduled Caste and Scheduled Tribe (Prevention of Atrocities) Act, 1989.

The case was dismissed by the Karnataka High Court as "a vexatious attempt to harass the petitioners".
