= Savitribai Phule Pune University =

Public university in Pune, Maharashtra, India

- Coat of arms
- Former names: University of Poona; University of Pune
- Motto: Yaḥ kriyāvān saḥ paṇḍitaḥ (Sanskrit)
- Motto in English: Where Actions Prove Knowledge
- Type: Public state university
- Established: 10 February 1949; 77 years ago
- Affiliations: UGC
- Budget: ₹593.53 crore (US$62 million) (2021–22)
- Chancellor: Governor of Maharashtra
- Vice-Chancellor: Dr. Suresh Gosavi
- Students: 665121
- Postgraduates: 6,948
- Location: Ganeshkhind, Aundh, Pune, Maharashtra, India; 18.5523°N 73.8246°E
- Campus: Urban
- Colors: Dark cyan Tangerine
- Website: www.unipune.ac.in

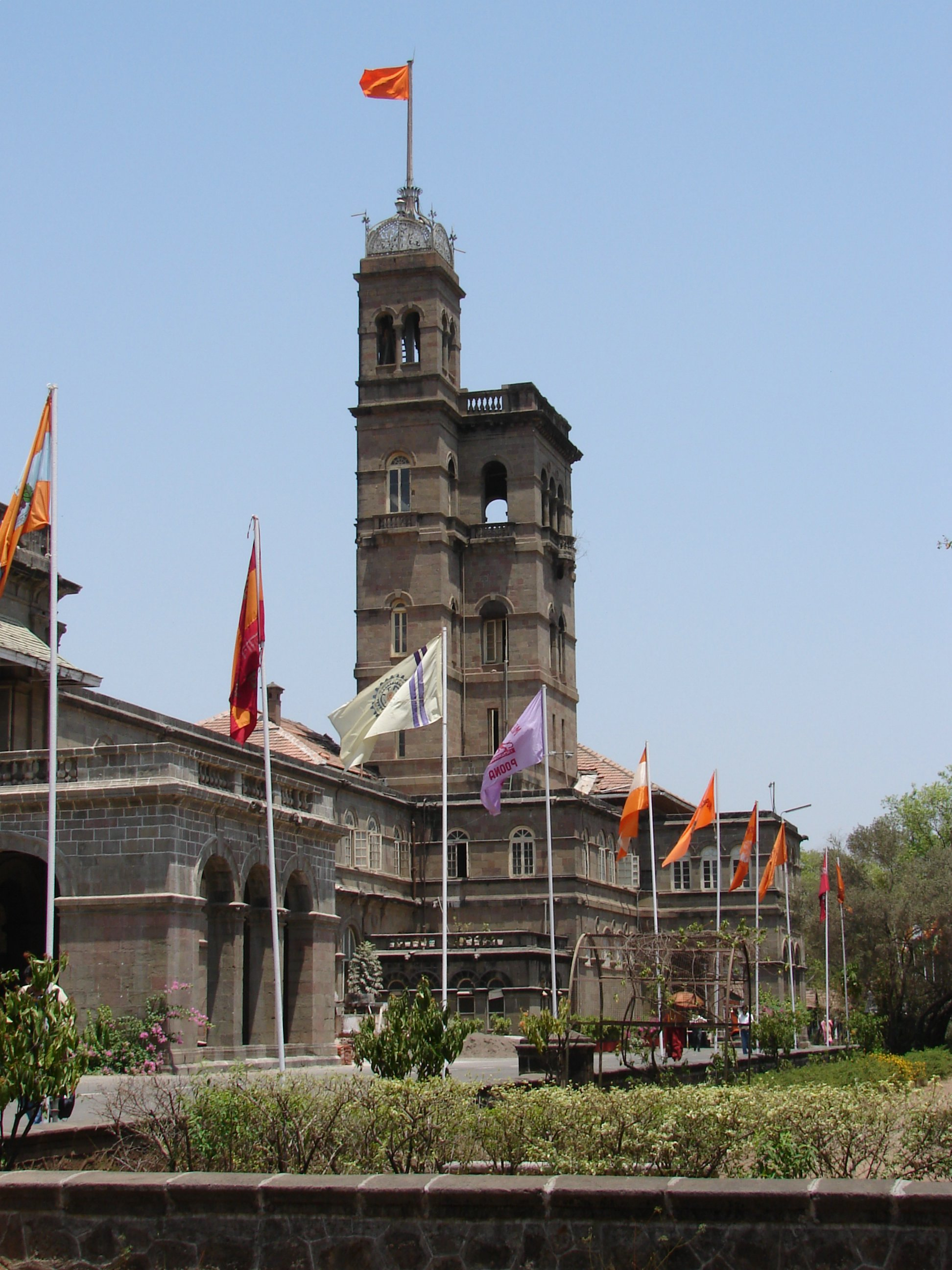
Main building of Pune University

Savitribai Phule Pune University (SPPU), formerly the University of Pune, is a public state university located in the city of Pune, India. It was established in 1949, and is spread over a 411 acres (1.66 km^{2}) campus in the neighbourhood of Ganeshkhind. The university houses 46 academic departments. It has about 307 recognised research institutes and 612 affiliated colleges offering graduate and under-graduate courses. Savitribai Phule Pune University Ranked 12th NIRF Ranking in 2022.

== History ==
The University of Pune was established on 10 February 1949 under the Pune University Act passed by the Bombay legislature in 1948. M. R. Jayakar became its first vice-chancellor. Its first office was started from the Nizam Guest House, which is part of Bhandarkar Oriental Research Institute on Law College Road. The university was operated at Nizam Guest House until 1 June 1949. Its current building was originally called the Governor House. As its name suggests, it was the seasonal retreat of the governor of Bombay. B. G. Kher, Chief Minister and Education Minister of the government of Bombay, helped ensure the university received a large allocation of land for their campus. The university was allocated over 411 acres (1.66 km^{2}).

The institution's name was changed from the University of Pune to Savitribai Phule Pune University on 9 August 2014 in honor of 19th century Indian social reformer Savitribai Phule, who played an important role in improving the lives of women and the Dalit communities in Maharashtra during British colonial rule. She and her husband Mahatma Jyotiba Phule founded India's first native-run school for girls in 1848.

== Organisation and administration ==
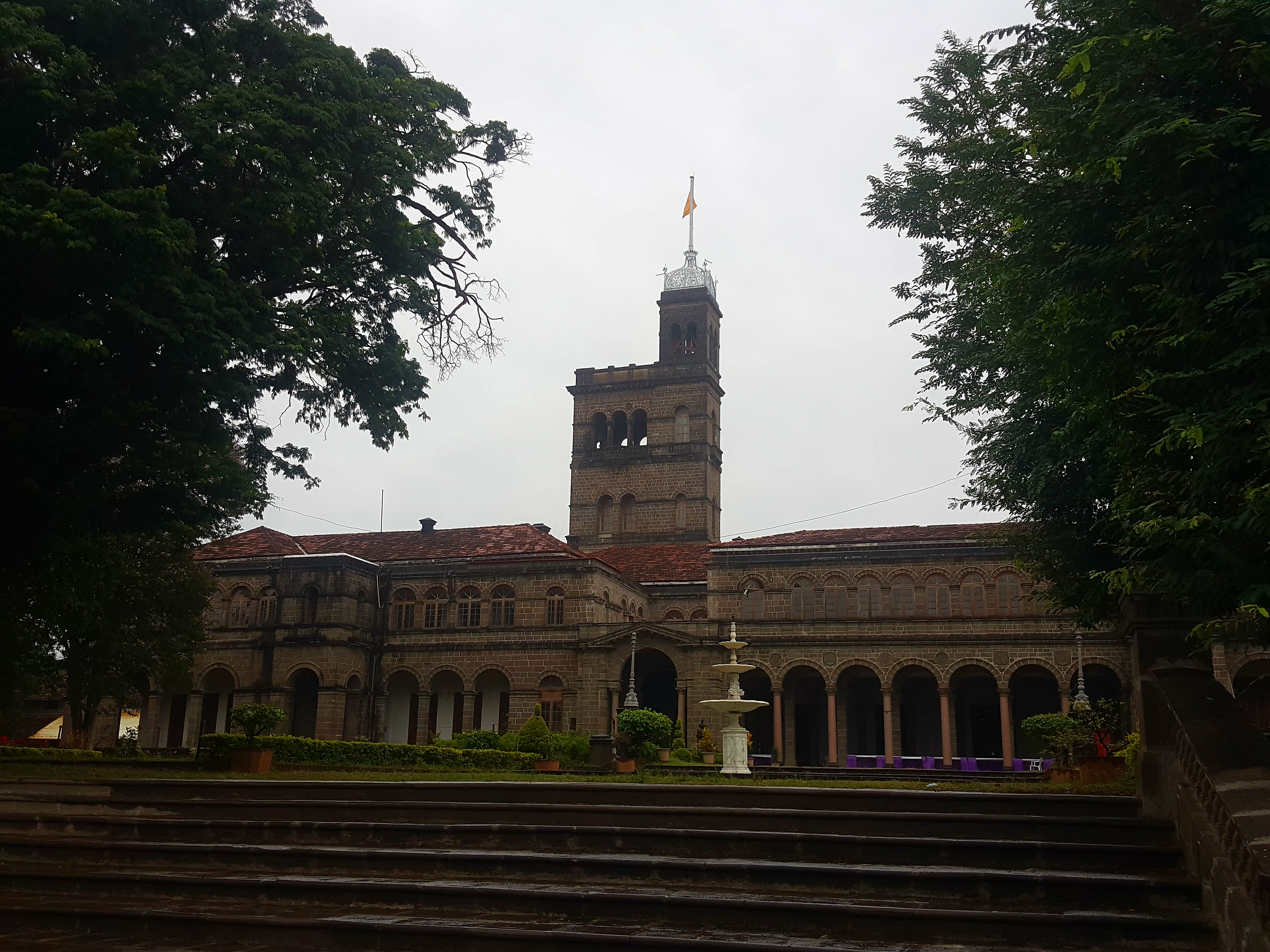
Entrance to the main building

=== Governance ===
==== Jurisdiction ====
Originally, the university had a jurisdiction extending over 12 districts of western Maharashtra. With the establishment of Shivaji University in Kolhapur in 1962, the jurisdiction was restricted to five districts: Pune, Ahmednagar, Nashik, Dhule, and Jalgaon. Out of these, two districts—Dhule and Jalgaon—are attached to the North Maharashtra University in Jalgaon established in August 1990.

==== Vice-Chancellors ====
Past and present vice-chancellors of the university are:

No	Year	Name
1	1948–56	Mukund Ramrao Jayakar
2	1956–1959	R. P. Paranjpye
3	1959–1961	Dattatreya Gopal Karve
4	1961–1964	Datto Vaman Potdar
5	1964–1966	Narahar Vishnu Gadgil
6	1966–1967	Dhananjay Ramchandra Gadgil
7	1967–1970	Hari Vinayak Pataskar
8	1970–1972	B. P. Apte
9	1972–1975	G. S. Mahajan
10	1975–1978	Devdatta Dabholkar
11	1978–1984	Ram G. Takwale
12	1984–1988	V. G. Bhide
13	1988–1995	S. C. Gupta
14	1995–1998	Vasant Gowarikar
15	1998–2000	Arun Nigavekar
16	2000–2001	N. J. Sonawane
17	2001–2006	Ashok S. Kolaskar
18	2006–2006	Ratnakar Gaikwad
19	2006–2009	Narendra Jadhav
20	2009–2010	Dr. Arun Adsool
21	2010–2011	Sanjay Chahande
22	2012–2017	Wasudeo Gade
21	2017-2022	Nitin R. Karmalkar
22	2022–2023	Karbhari V. Kale
23	2023–present	Prof.(Dr.) Suresh Gosavi

=== Departments ===
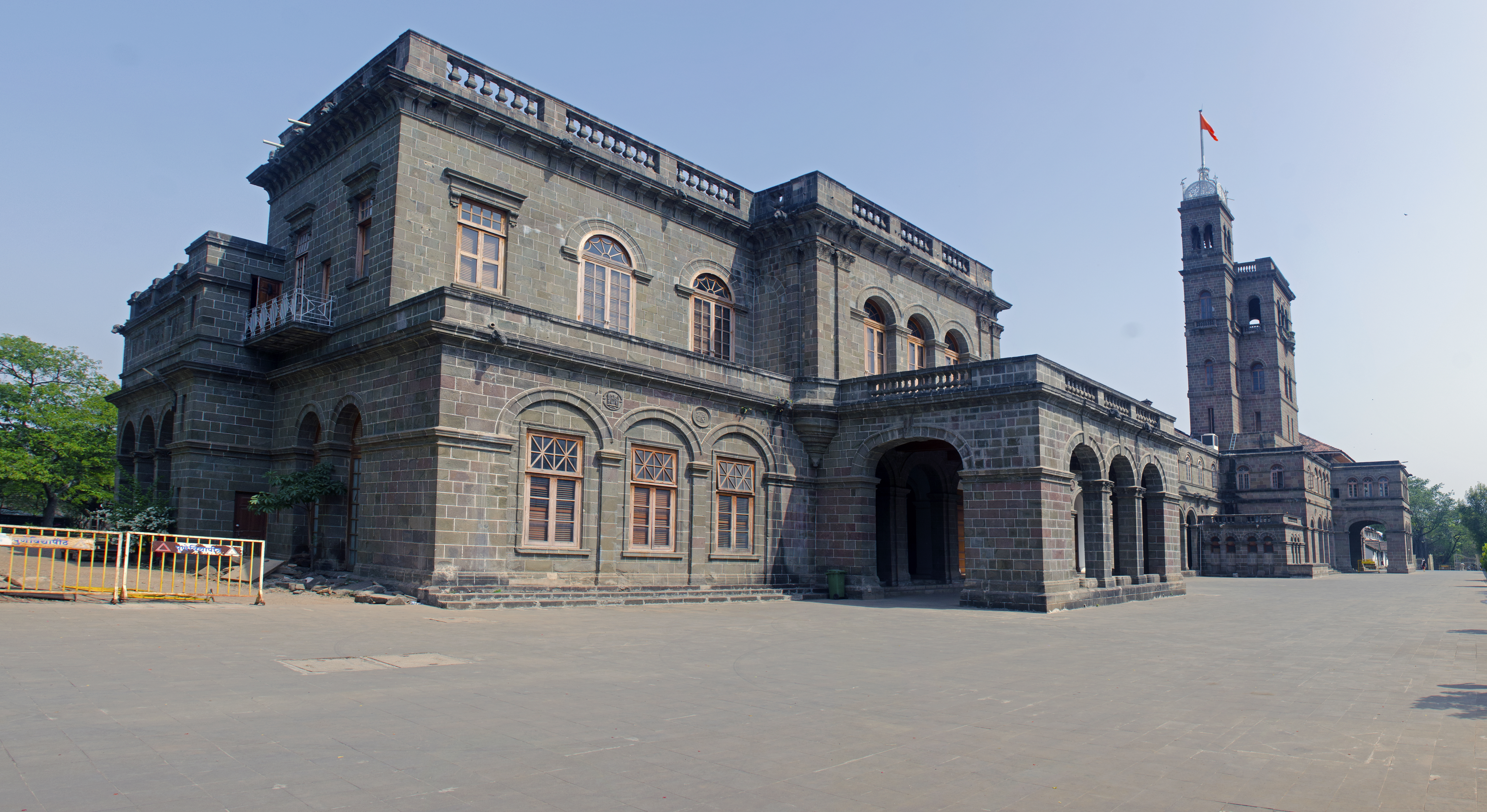
Administrative Building

The university has various departments and centres, offering courses in science, social science, management, law, etc.

- The Engineering department offers courses in various fields, including Computer Science Engineering, Artificial Intelligence and Data Science, Civil Engineering, Mechanical Engineering, Electrical Engineering, Robotics and Automation, and Electronics & Telecommunications Engineering.
- Unipune offers a bachelor's degree course in Environment Science. The course started from the academic year of 2018–2019.
- The Department of Foreign Languages was started in Ranade institute building in 1949. It offers courses for German, French, Russian, Japanese and Spanish languages from elementary level to post-graduate courses. Batches are conducted in morning as well as in evening.
- Competition Exam Center (CEC): is for coaching programs for various government competition exams.
- Krantijyoti Savitribai Phule Women's Studies Centre.
- Department of Management Sciences (PUMBA), an autonomous department offering MBA programs.

== Rankings ==
University rankings

General – international
- QS (World) (2023): 541-550
- QS (Asia) (2023): 207
- Times (World) (2023): 601-800
- Times (Asia) (2022): 201-250
- Times (Emerging) (2022): 201-250

General – India
- NIRF (Overall) (2024): 37
- NIRF (Universities) (2024): 23
- Outlook India (Universities) (2020): 9

Savitribai Phule Pune University was ranked in the 601–800 band in the world by the Times Higher Education World University Rankings of 2023, as well as in the 201-250 band in Asia and in the 201-250 band among Emerging Economies University Rankings in 2022.

It was ranked 37th in India overall by the National Institutional Ranking Framework (NIRF) and 23rd among universities in 2024.

== Student life ==
The colleges of the university provide residence halls for students. The International Centre provides residences for international students, including visiting students.

== Admissions ==
Admissions are selective, based on entrance exams like MHT-CET for B.Tech., with varying cutoffs and university-specific exams for other programs.

== Notable people ==
Notable Alumni of Savitribai Phule Pune University

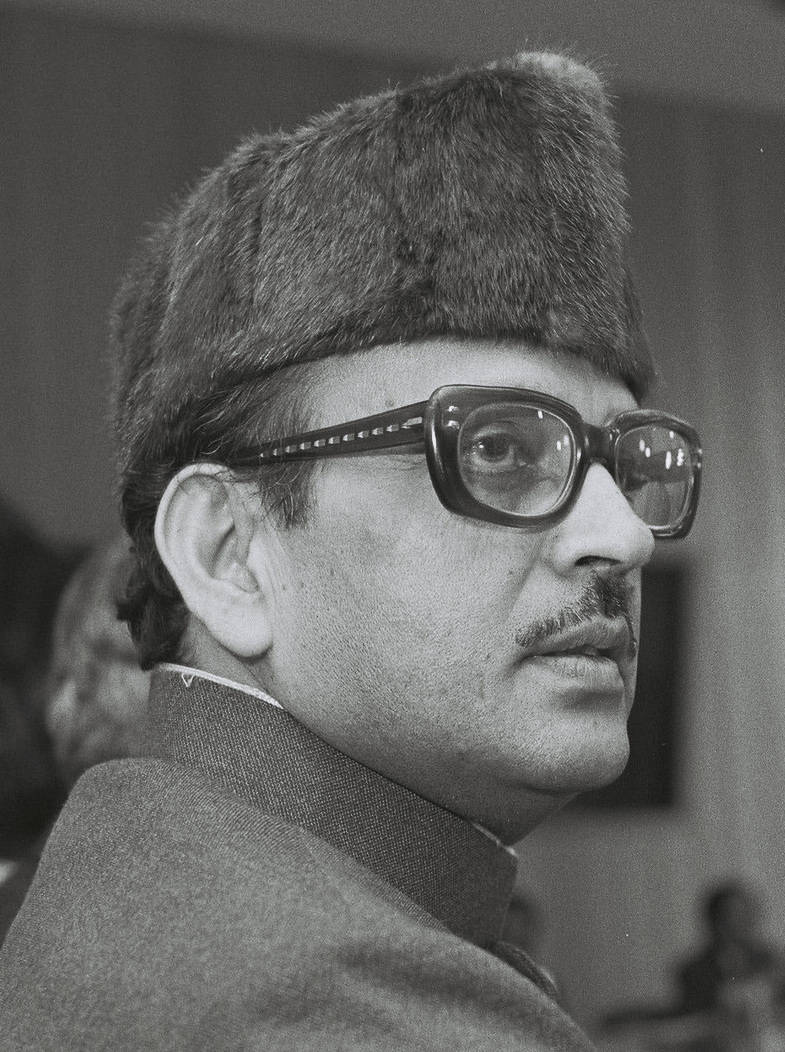
Vishwanath Pratap Singh - Indian Minister for Trade to the CEC and 7th Prime Minister of India

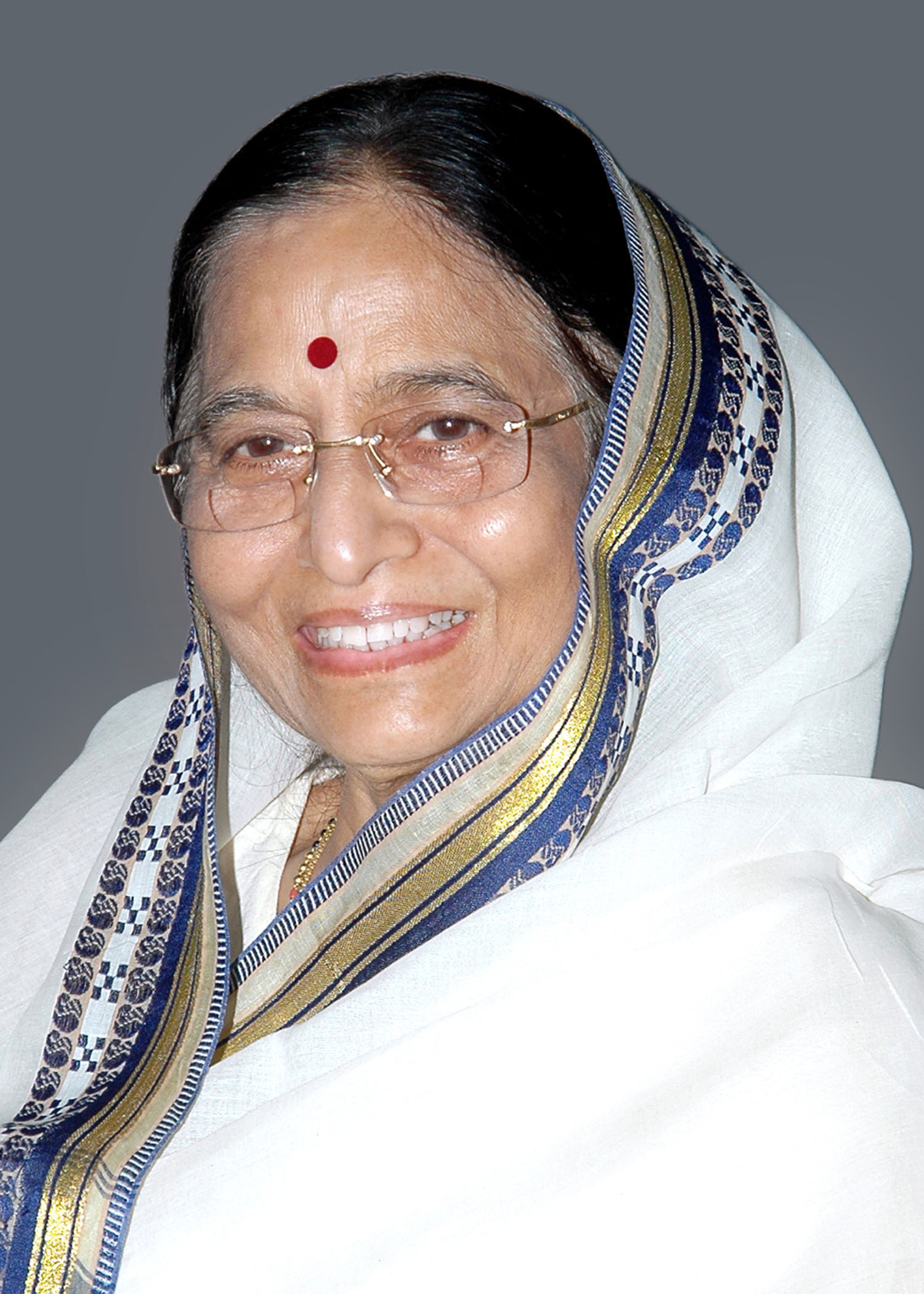
Smt. Pratibha Patil - 12th President of India

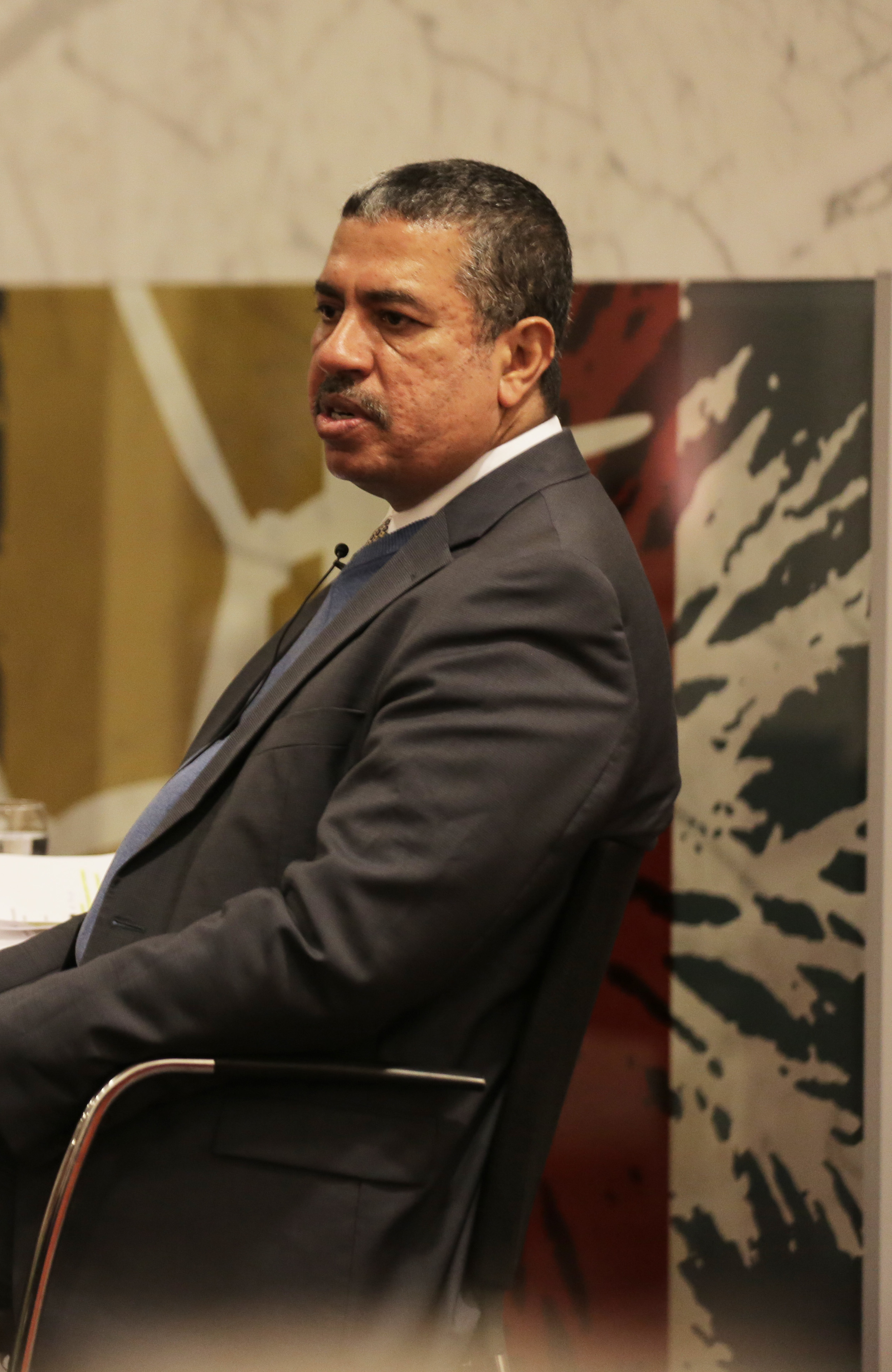
Khaled Bahah - 8th Prime Minister of Yemen

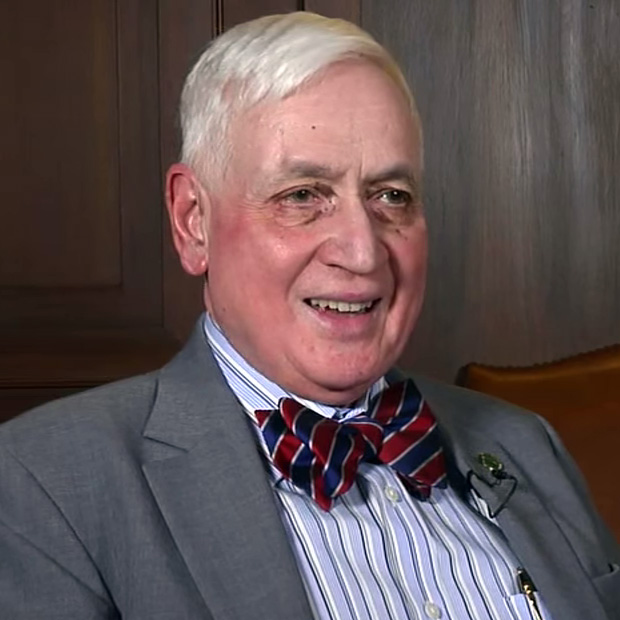
C. Kumar N. Patel - Inventor of the carbon dioxide laser and National Medal of Science recipient

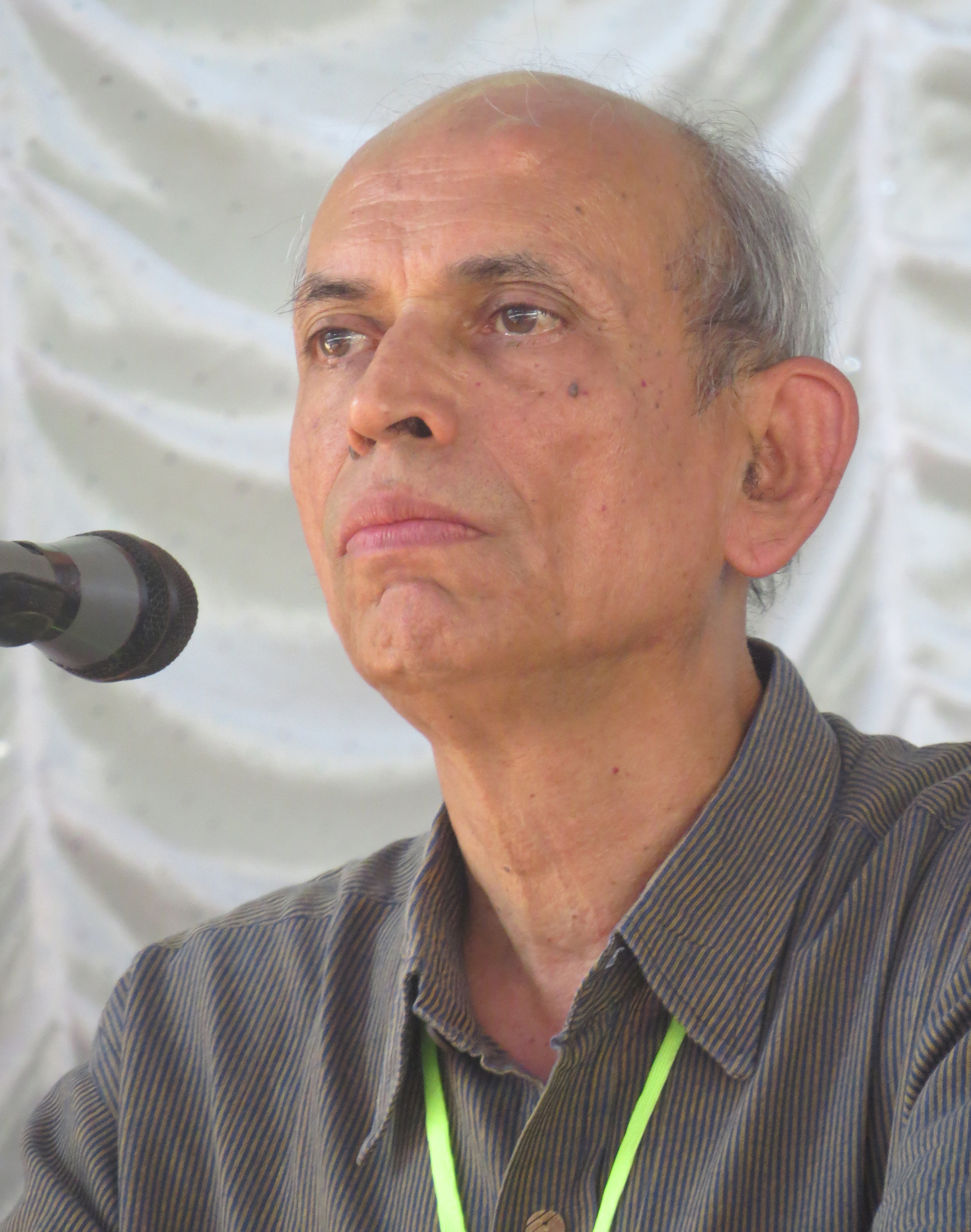
Madhav Gadgil - Ecologist and distinguished Harvard University Professor

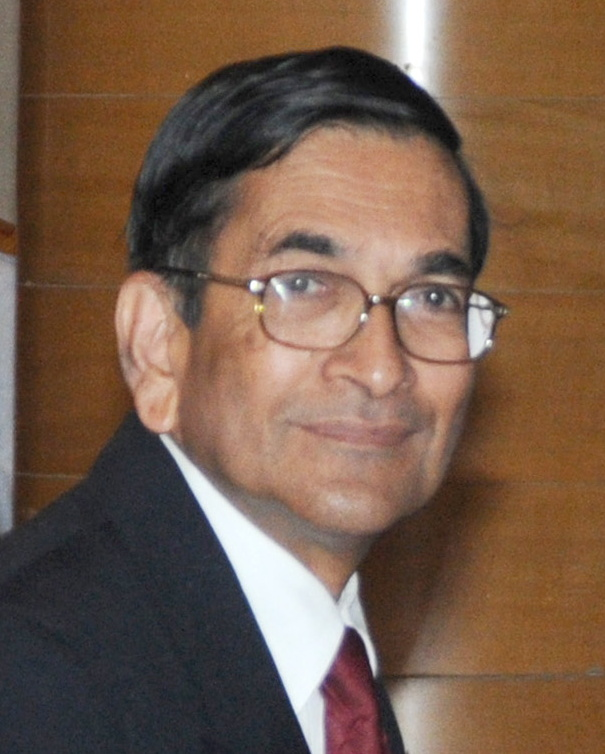
Padmanabhan Balaram - Former director of the Indian Institute of Science, Bangalore and Padma Bhushan recipient

Alumni

Alumni of Savitribai Phule Pune University include major politicians of India, including Vishwanath Pratap Singh, 7th Prime Minister of India; Pratibha Patil, 12th President of India; Vilasrao Deshmukh, 17th and 19th Chief Minister of Maharashtra; Sharad Pawar, former Chief Minister of Maharashtra; and P. V. Narasimha Rao, 9th Prime Minister of India. Other notable politicians who have graduated from the college include Agatha Sangma, K. T. Rama Rao, Prakash Javadekar, Nabeel Rajab, and Khaled Bahah, 2nd Vice President and Prime Minister of Yemen.

In science and engineering, notable alumni of the university include Padmanabhan Balaram, chemist and director of the Indian Institute of Science; Kantilal Mardia, statistician and Guy Medallists; Thomas Kailath, electrical engineer and recipient of the 2014 National Medal of Science; Vistasp Karbhari, civil engineer and the eighth president of the University of Texas at Arlington; Suhas Patankar, professor at the University of Minnesota; C. Kumar N. Patel, inventor of the carbon dioxide laser and recipient of the 1996 National Medal of Science and vice-Chancellor for Research at the University of California, Los Angeles; and Vinod Scaria, bioinformatician who is known for sequencing the first Indian genome.

Faculty

V. S. Huzurbazar served as the first head of the statistics department. Other notable faculty include author S.N. Sadasivan, ecologist Madhav Gadgil, and meteorologist Sulochana Gadgil.

== See also ==
- List of universities in India
- Universities and colleges in India
- List of Savitribai Phule Pune University people
