= Debasis Dash =

Indian computational biologist

- Born: 17 June 1972 (age 54); Bhubaneswar, India
- Known for: Studies on computational biology
- Awards: 2004 CSIR Young Scientist of the Year; 2014 N-BIOS Prize
- Scientific career
- Fields: Computational biology; Artificial intelligence in healthcare
- Institutions: Institute of Genomics and Integrative Biology; Institute of Life Sciences

Debasis Dash is an Indian computational biologist and chief scientist at the Institute of Genomics and Integrative Biology (IGIB). Known for his research on proteomics and Big Data and Artificial Intelligence studies, his studies have been documented by way of a number of articles and ResearchGate, an online repository of scientific articles has listed 120 of them. The Department of Biotechnology of the Government of India awarded him the National Bioscience Award for Career Development, one of the highest Indian science awards, for his contributions to biosciences, in 2014. He was appointed as the director of Institute of Life Sciences, Bhubaneswar on 18 May 2023.

== Biography ==
Debasis Dash, born on 17 June 1972 in Bhubaneswar, completed his master's degree in chemistry at Delhi University before securing a PhD in 1998. He joined IGIB as scientist in 2000 where he now serves as professor and head for Big Data and AI decision Unit. His contributions have led to the establishment of a thriving school in the realm of genome, proteome and health care informatics.

One of Dr. Dash's notable achievements includes the development of award-winning commercial software suites such as PLHost and Genocluster, which garnered recognition at the Bangalore Bio conferences in 2005 and 2006 for the best product presentation. Collaborating with researchers utilizing the PLHost tool, Dr. Dash's team identified novel genes coding for chromatin remodeling proteins called INO-80, as published in the esteemed Online Mendelian Inheritance in Man (OMIM) database. He has been also part of renowned Open Source Drug Discovery project and Indian Genome Variation Consortium, the largest study conducted on healthy individuals in India to catalog basal genomic variation across diverse populations. In the realm of virology, Dr. Dash's unique GeneD'cipher algorithm identified three novel genes in the SARS virus, aiding in its diagnosis during the outbreak in China. His exceptional contribution in this area received extensive media coverage, with headlines such as "Indian scientists develop Gene Decipher to fight against SARS" featured in prominent publications like India Today, Economic Times, and The Hindu. Additionally, Dr. Dash played a crucial role in establishing the GN Ramachandran Knowledge Centre for Genome Informatics at IGIB.

Combining genomics and proteomics, Dr. Dash ventured into proteogenomics, developing computational algorithms and associated software suites like MassWiz, flexifdr, and ProteoStats. Through his systematic analysis of proteomics data, he made significant discoveries, including the identification of proteins in human plasma, M. tuberculosis, agriculturally important symbiont B. Japonicum, and the missing proteome in humans. In last 5 years, Dr. Dash has also made notable contributions to the development of AI-based medical imaging tools. He has worked on projects such as CovBaseAI project, focusing on the detection and diagnosis of COVID-19 pneumonia from chest X-rays. He has also been involved in the RAPID-CT, aiming to reduce turnaround time and prioritize patients based on their condition using automated triage of medical images. Furthermore, Dr. Dash has worked on the identification and classification of Interstitial Lung Diseases (ILD) from CT scans, aiming to develop a system for texture-based analysis and quantification.

Dr. Dash's research has also fostered the growth of bioinformatics research in India and resulted in the establishment of a school of genome informatics in India, with many of his trained students receiving prestigious fellowships and holding faculty positions at renowned institutions like IIT, IISER, THSTI, and Delhi University.

In summary, Dr. Debasis Dash's scientific journey in genome informatics has contributed significantly to the field of biological sciences. His ideas, pioneering algorithms, and research have garnered international recognition, positioning CSIR-IGIB as a leading institution in bioinformatics. Dr. Dash’s research in genomics, proteomics, and proteogenomics has led to new developments in biological systems. His work has influenced methods used in diagnostics, drug discovery, and personalized medicine.

== Awards and honors ==
- 2004 - CSIR Young Scientist Awards (YSA) from Council of Scientific & Industrial Research
- 2010 - Indo-US Science & Technology Fellowship
- 2014 - National Bioscience Award for Career Development from Department of biotechnology, India

== Patents ==
- A computer based method for identifying peptides useful as drug targets.

         US, PCT: NF64/2000; Samir K. Brahmachari and Debasis Dash

- A computer based method for predicting protein coding DNA sequences useful as drug targets.

         US, PCT: NF 421/03; S.K. Brahmachari, D. Dash, J.K Maheshwari and R. Sharma

== Selected bibliography ==
- Dhar, Mahesh S.; Marwal, Robin; Vs, Radhakrishnan; Ponnusamy, Kalaiarasan; Jolly, Bani; Bhoyar, Rahul C.; Sardana, Viren; Naushin, Salwa; Rophina, Mercy; Mellan, Thomas A.; Mishra, Swapnil; Whittaker, Charles; Fatihi, Saman; Datta, Meena; Singh, Priyanka (19 November 2021). "Genomic characterization and epidemiology of an emerging SARS-CoV-2 variant in Delhi, India". Science. 374 (6570): 995–999. doi:10.1126/science.abj9932. ISSN 0036-8075. PMC 7612010. PMID 34648303.
- Singh, Prateek; Ujjainiya, Rajat; Prakash, Satyartha; Naushin, Salwa; Sardana, Viren; Bhatheja, Nitin; Singh, Ajay Pratap; Barman, Joydeb; Kumar, Kartik; Gayali, Saurabh; Khan, Raju; Rawat, Birendra Singh; Tallapaka, Karthik Bharadwaj; Anumalla, Mahesh; Lahiri, Amit (1 July 2022). "A machine learning-based approach to determine infection status in recipients of BBV152 (Covaxin) whole-virion inactivated SARS-CoV-2 vaccine for serological surveys". Computers in Biology and Medicine. 146: 105419. doi:10.1016/j.compbiomed.2022.105419. ISSN 0010-4825.
- Ujjainiya, Rajat; Tyagi, Akansha; Sardana, Viren; Naushin, Salwa; Bhatheja, Nitin; Kumar, Kartik; Barman, Joydeb; Prakash, Satyartha; Kutum, Rintu; Bhaskar, Akash Kumar; Singh, Prateek; Chaudhary, Kumardeep; Loomba, Menka; Khanna, Yukti; Walecha, Chestha (1 April 2022). "High failure rate of ChAdOx1-nCoV19 immunization against asymptomatic infection in healthcare workers during a Delta variant surge". Nature Communications. 13 (1): 1726. doi:10.1038/s41467-022-29404-3. ISSN 2041-1723.
- Kumar, Dhirendra; Yadav, Amit Kumar; Jia, Xinying; Mulvenna, Jason; Dash, Debasis (1 January 2016). "Integrated Transcriptomic-Proteomic Analysis Using a Proteogenomic Workflow Refines Rat Genome Annotation*". Molecular & Cellular Proteomics. 15 (1): 329–339. doi:10.1074/mcp.M114.047126. ISSN 1535-9476.
- Yadav, Amit Kumar; Bhardwaj, Gourav; Basak, Trayambak; Kumar, Dhirendra; Ahmad, Shadab; Priyadarshini, Ruby; Singh, Ashish Kumar; Dash, Debasis; Sengupta, Shantanu (7 September 2011). "A Systematic Analysis of Eluted Fraction of Plasma Post Immunoaffinity Depletion: Implications in Biomarker Discovery". PLOS ONE. 6 (9): e24442. doi:10.1371/journal.pone.0024442. ISSN 1932-6203. PMC 3168506. PMID 21931718.
- Singh, Gajinder Pal; Ganapathi, Mythily; Dash, Debasis (11 December 2006). "Role of intrinsic disorder in transient interactions of hub proteins". Proteins: Structure, Function, and Bioinformatics. 66 (4): 761–765. doi:10.1002/prot.21281.
