= Ashok Pandey =

Indian chemist and biotechnologist

Ashok Kumar Pandey
- Born: 1 January 1956 (age 70); Kanpur, Uttar Pradesh, India
- Education: University of Allahabad
- Known for: Retracted publication
- Scientific career
- Fields: Chemistry; Biotechnology
- Workplaces: National Sugar Institute; CSIR-NIIST; Center of Innovative and Applied Bioprocessing; Indian Institute of Toxicology Research
- Doctoral advisor: K.P. Tiwari
- Website: ashokpandey.org

Ashok Kumar Pandey (born 1 January 1956) is an Indian chemist and biotechnologist, who had served as Distinguished Scientist at CSIR-Indian Institute of Toxicology Research, Lucknow, Government of India, and Executive Director at the Centre for Energy and Environmental Sustainability. With over 1450 research papers, 16 patents, 95 books, he became India's most prolific researcher. By 2018, he was one of the most highly cited researchers in the world, within the top 1% according to Web of Science; and number 1 from India by 2021. For his enormous research outputs, Human Resource Development minister Shri Prakash Javadekar honoured him as the "most outstanding researcher" in biology in 2018.

Pandey was the editor and then editor-in-chief of Elsevier's journal Bioresource Technology for over a decade. By 2025, 43 of the research papers he co-authored in the journal were retracted, as Elsevier established that he added his name in those papers and violated the journal's policies in the peer review process. In most of his papers, he added his named after he received the manuscripts, and then handled the entire peer reviewing. Elsevier also retracted several papers by different researchers which Pandey edited and handled the reviewing, but Pandey's name was there in the initial manuscripts and the authors were his collaborators in many of his publications.

== Biography ==
Pandey was born in Kanpur, Uttarakhand Pradesh. He studied biology and chemistry at Kanpur University (now Chhatrapati Shahu Ji Maharaj University), obtaining his BSc degree in 1974, at an age of 18. He pursued master's degree in chemistry and graduated in 1976 from the same university. He enrolled for doctoral course at the University of Allahabad, earning his D.Phil. degree in 1979 in chemistry with a research focus on microbiology. His research was supervised by organic chemist K.P. Tiwari on lactic acid fermentation, the first papers of which were published in 1979. Between 1979 and 1982, he continued in the same department as a post-doctoral scholar, and published several papers on his thesis subject.

In 1982, Pandey got an appointment as a scientist at the National Sugar Institute, Kanpur, where he worked till 1985. He became a research scientist at Suddeutsche Zucker AG in Germany. After working there for a year, he joined CSIR National Institute for Interdisciplinary Science and Technology (CSIR-NIIST) at Trivandrum as a full scientist in 1987. He retired from CSIR-NIIST in 2015 and became Distinguished Scientist at the Center of Innovative and Applied Bioprocessing (CIAB), an autonomous institute of the Department of Biotechnology, Government of India. In 2018, he continued as Distinguished Scientist at the CSIR-Indian Institute of Toxicology Research in Lucknow.

Pandey joined the editorial board of Elsevier's journal Bioresource Technology in 2004, becoming the executive editor in 2010 and editor-in-chief in 2011.

== Awards and honours ==
Pandey was awarded the Young Scientist Award from the Department of Science and Technology, Trivandrum in 1989, the GBF fellowship of Germany and CNRS fellowship of France Fellowships in 1992, the Raman Research Fellowship Award from CSIR in 1995, and UNESCO Professor in 2000.

In 2018, the Web of Science analysis included Pandey in the top 1% of the most highly cited researchers in the world, and top 10 in India. To honour his prolific outputs Human Resource Development minister Prakash Javadekar honoured him with the "most outstanding researcher" award in biology, among 17 other researchers in various field, in 2018. The honour was accompanied by Life-Time Achievement Award from the Biotech Research Society, Life-Time Achievement Award from Venus International Research Awards, and Most Outstanding Researcher Award from Career360. His Web of Science ranking and citation index grew steadily since then. By 2021, he became number 1 most cited researchers from India.

Pandey is elected fellow of the Biotech Research Society (2005), International Organization of Biotechnology and Bioengineering (2007), Association of Microbiologists of India (2008), National Academy of Sciences (2012), International Society for Energy, Environment and Sustainability (2016), and the Royal Society of Biology (2016).

== Publication controversy ==
Pandey's first paper to be retracted was a case of irreproducible research data. He described a new species of soil bacteria in 2012, named Micrococcus niistensis after his work place at the time, the National Institute for Interdisciplinary Science and Technology (NIIST). The publisher, International Journal of Systematic and Evolutionary Microbiology, retracted the paper on the ground that there was not "sufficient evidence" to identify the reported specimen as a new species as the researchers failed to deposit the pure culture of the specimen required for taxonomic validation.

By September 2024, 45 papers by Pandey were retracted by different journals. Pandey published 43 research papers in Bioresource Technology alone, 1 during his position as an editor, 1 as the executive editor, and the rest as the editor-in-chief. All the papers were retracted by 2025 when Elsevier made an investigation on the alleged malpractices of Pandey as the author in these papers. According to Elsevier, the reason was "violations of the journal's policies on authorship and conflict of interest related to the submission and review of this [specified in the retraction note] paper."

=== Modus operandi ===
Pandey had no research or intellectual contributions to most of the retracted papers. As Elsevier investigation announced, different researchers submit their manuscripts to the journal, he returned the manuscript and when the authors revised and resubmit their manuscript, his name was incorporated as one of the authors. Then, he handled the entire peer reviewing process. The same pattern was verified in 35 of his research papers. As Elsevier retraction notice described:

Review of the initial submission of this paper was handled by the then journal Editor-in-Chief (Ashok Pandey) and revision required. Upon submission of the revised version, the journal Editor-in-Chief was added as a co-author. No justification was provided for this addition. A second editor was assigned to the paper, eventually accepting the paper for publication. This compromised the editorial process and breached the journal's policies.

Elsevier also pointed out that Pandey's name was in four other research papers in which his name was included in the initial manuscripts, but was removed in the final publication. It is Elsevier's policy that if any editor is an author or co-author in the same journal, editorial duty and peer reviewing are handled by other editors. In his defence, Pandey told The Hindu that he knew as an editor that he handled the entire publication but blamed the journal manager for not assigning other editors. His co-author in two retracted papers, Anil Kumar Patel at Korea University also concurred remarking that the journal manager failed the responsibility but that Pandey's conduct was unethical.

Pandey was an inveterate manipulator as an editor. Not only were his authored papers retracted by Bioresource Technology, but several others in which he was the handling editor. The general stratagem he used were:

- Assign reviewers from his circle of collaborators with whom he had authored several papers;
- Add names of his collaborators during revision of the manuscript "without validation or authorisation", as Elsevier noted.
- Inform the authors to add his papers in the citation. In one instance, the original manuscript had 3 of his papers cited but 10 in the published version.

In another case, Pandey was involved in an extensive plagiarism. A review paper titled "Metagenomics for taxonomy profiling: tools and approaches" he published in Taylor & Francis's Bioengineered in 2020 was found to contain texts copied from other published papers. The paper was retracted in 2022.
