= Pareek (surname) =

Pareek is a surname. Notable people with the surname include:

- Anil Pareek (born 1957), Indian medical researcher
- Ashwani Pareek (born 1969), Indian plant biologist and educator
- Rajendra Pareek (born 1948), Indian politician
- Rakesh Pareek (born 1959), Indian politician
