= T. R. Sharma =

Indian plant biologist (Born:1965)

- Born: 20 May 1965 (age 61); Hamirpur, Himachal Pradesh, India
- Education: Government High School, Ladraur; CSK HPKV; University of Alberta
- Known for: Studies on genomics and plant disease resistance
- Awards: 1998 NAAS Young Scientist Award; 1999 Young Scientist Award; 2001 ISCA Umakant Sinha Memorial Award; 2007 N-BIOS Prize; 2008 NAAS Recognition Award; 2011 VASVIK Award; 2011 Rafi Ahmed Kidwai Award; 2013 NASI-Reliance Platinum Jubilee Award
- Scientific career
- Fields: Plant biology
- Workplaces: CSK HPKV; ICAR-National Research Centre on Plant Biotechnology; Cold Spring Harbor Laboratory; National Agri-Food Biotechnology Institute; Center of Innovative and Applied Bioprocessing

Tilak Raj Sharma (born 20 May 1965) is an Indian plant biologist, the deputy director general (CS) of ICAR and former executive director and chief executive officer of the National Agri-Food Biotechnology Institute (NABI), and Center of Innovative and Applied Bioprocessing (CIAB) respectively, both autonomous institutes under the Department of Biotechnology. Known for his studies in the fields of genomics and plant disease resistance, Sharma is an elected fellow of the National Academy of Sciences, India, the National Academy of Agricultural Sciences and the Indian National Science Academy. In 2007, Sharma received the National Bioscience Award for Career Development from the Department of Biotechnology, recognizing his contributions to biosciences.

== Biography ==
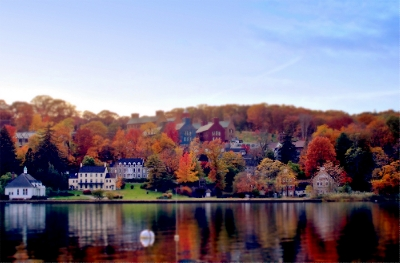
Cold Spring Harbor Laboratory

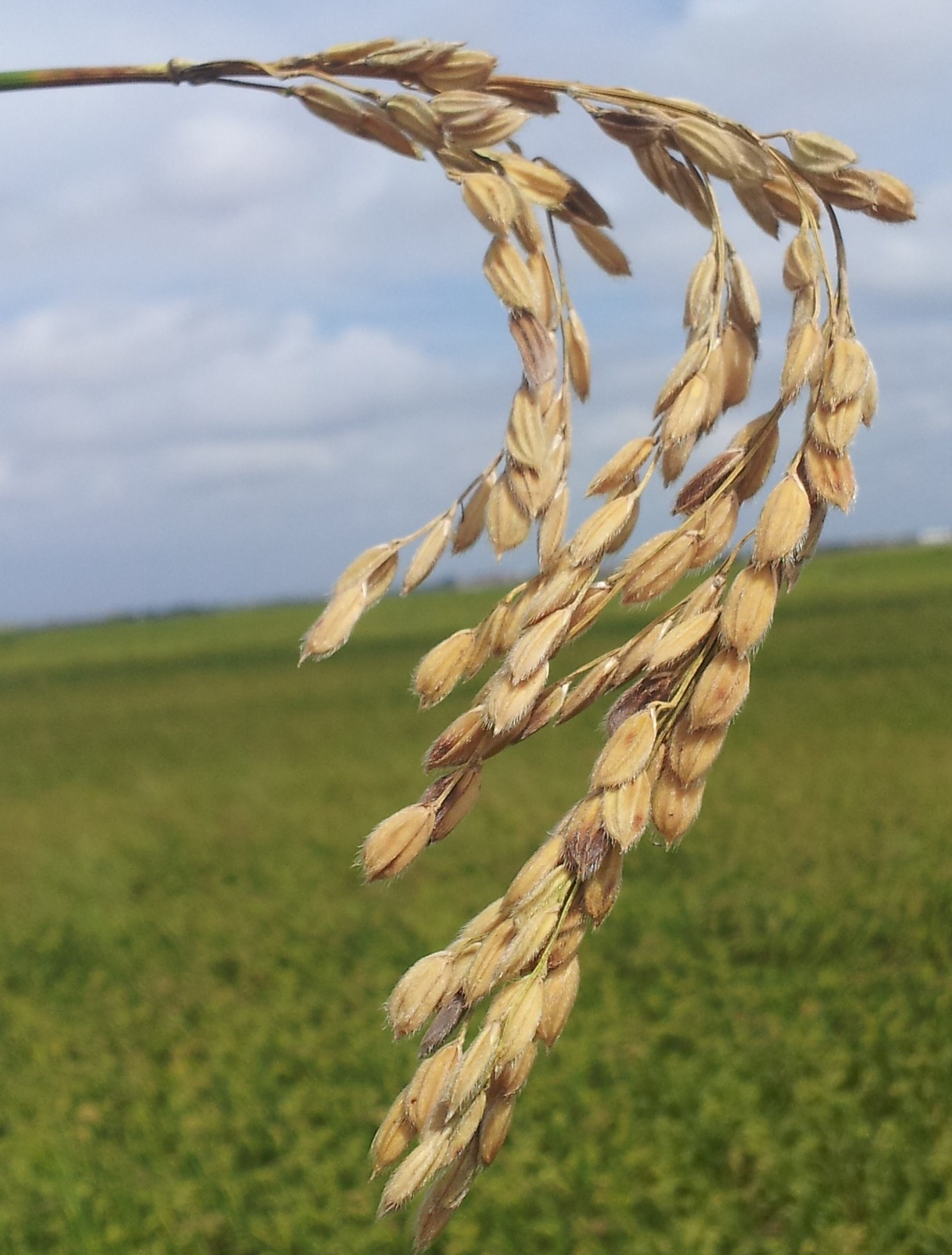
J. Sendra rice affected by Magnaporthe oryzae.

T. R. Sharma was born on 20 May 1965 at Hamirpur in the north-east Indian state of Himachal Pradesh. After completing early schooling at the Government High School in Ladrour in 1980, he joined the College of Agriculture of Chaudhary Sarwan Kumar Himachal Pradesh Krishi Vishvavidyalaya (CSK HPKV) from where he earned a BSc in agriculture in 1985, an MSc in 1987 and a PhD in 1990, working on a Dr. K. S. Krishnan fellowship from Bhabha Atomic Research Centre. (Note: His PhD thesis was on the Induction and transfer of resistance to Alternaria blight of mustard which won the University Gold Medal and Certificate of Honor) Subsequently, he started his career by joining CSK HPKV as an assistant professor in 1991 where he served in various capacities until 2014. During this period, he did his post-doctoral studies at the University of Alberta in Edmonton, Canada from 1994 to 1996 as a research associate of the Department of Biotechnology, held the positions of a senior scientist from 1999 to 2007, and of a principal scientist until 2014 when he was appointed as the principal scientist on deputation and the project director of the National Research Centre on Plant Biotechnology of the Indian Council of Agricultural Research, housed in the Indian Agricultural Research Institute, New Delhi. He served the research centre for almost three years and moved to the National Agri-Food Biotechnology Institute (NABI), an autonomous institute under the Department of Biotechnology (DBT) in Mohali, in January 2017 as its executive director, a position he holds to date. Simultaneously, he also serves as the chief executive officer of the Center of Innovative and Applied Bioprocessing (CIAB), another DBT institution in Mohali. He also had two stints in the US in 2001 and 2004, as a visiting scientist at the Genome Research Centre of the Cold Spring Harbor Laboratory where he worked on Rice genome sequencing, genome sequence finishing and genome analysis.

Sharma resides in the Executive Director's Residence in NABI Campus at Knowledge City in Mohali, Punjab.

== Legacy ==
Sharma's research has been focusing the fields of genomics and plant disease resistance and he has worked on the crop improvement of rice. Sharma’s research on rice blast disease caused by the Magnaporthe oryzae fungus identified the Pi54 (Pi-kh) gene, which demonstrated resistance to the disease. He cloned this gene from the Indica Rice Line Tetep using positional cloning techniques. He developed new DNA markers namely SSR, STMS and SNP and isolated Pi54rh and Pi54of, two new alleles, from wild rice which showed resistance to Magnaporthe oryzae. Working on the sheath blight disease of rice caused by Rhizoctonia solani, the team led by him mapped a new gene, QTL qSBR11-1, which helped in the development of disease resistant rice varieties such as Pusa Basmati 1637 and HPR 2880. The development of a new cloning protocol for Avr-Pi54 gene from Magnaporthe oryzae as well as sequencing techniques of genes of rice, tomato, pigeon pea, Magnaporthe, and Puccinia were some of his other contributions. His studies have been documented by way of a number of articles (Note: Please see Selected bibliography section) and ResearchGate, an online repository of scientific articles has listed more than 200 of them. He also holds six Indian patents for the processes he has developed.

Sharma is the chief editor of the Journal of Plant Biochemistry and Biotechnology of Springer Media and sits in the editorial board of the Biotech Today journal. He is a life member of several scientific societies including the Biotechnology Society of India, the Society for Plant Biochemistry and Biotechnology, the Association for the Promotion of DNA Fingerprinting and other DNA Technologies (APDFDT) and the Indian Phytopathological Society. Besides, he has mentored many post-graduate and doctoral research scholars in their studies and has delivered plenary or invited speeches at seminars which included the lecture on a lecture on ‘Cloning and Characterization of Genes and their Application in Rice Improvements - A Success Story, delivered as a part of the NAAS lecture series at Punjab Agricultural University campus on 1 March 2017.

== Awards and honors ==
Sharma received the Young Scientist Award of the National Academy of Agricultural Sciences in 1998 and the Young Scientist Award of the Indian Council of Agricultural Research the next year. In 2001, he was selected for the Professor Umakant Sinha Memorial Award of the Indian Science Congress Association and two years later, he received the 2003 International Technology Award of the World Technology Network. The Department of Biotechnology of the Government of India awarded him the National Bioscience Award for Career Development, one of the highest Indian science awards in 2007. The National Academy of Agricultural Sciences honored him again with the NAAS Recognition Award in 2008 and he was chosen for the VASVIK Industrial Research Award in 2011. He received one more award in 2011 in the form of ICAR Rafi Ahmed Kidwai Award and he received the NASI-Reliance Platinum Jubilee Award in 2013.

Sharma was elected as a fellow by the National Academy of Sciences, India in 2007, the same year as he received the elected fellowship of the National Academy of Agricultural Sciences. He received the J. C. Bose National Fellowship of the Science and Engineering Research Board in 2013 and the Indian National Science Academy elected him as a fellow the same year. The award orations delivered by him include the 2016 edition of the Prof MGK Menon Lecture of the National Agri-Food Biotechnology Institute.

Gupta SK, Rai AK, Kanwar SS, Chand D, Singh NK, Sharma TR (2012) The single blast resistance gene Pi54 activates complex defense mechanism in rice. J Exp Bot 63:757-772

Kiran, K., Rawal, H. C., Dubey, H., Jaswal, R., Devanna, B. N........Sharma, T. R (2016) Draft genome of the wheat rust pathogen (Puccinia triticina) unravels genome-wide structural variations during evolution Genome Biol Evol(2016) doi: 10.1093/gbe/evw197.

International Rice Genome Sequencing Consortium (Matsumoto..A.K. Tyagi...N. K. Singh,.. T R Sharma et al.)(2005) The map-based sequence of the rice genome. Nature 436: 793-800

Sharma TR, Madhav MS, Singh BK, Shanker P, Jana TK, Dalal V, Pandit A, Singh A, Gaikwad K, Upreti HC, Singh NK (2005) High-resolution mapping, cloning and molecular characterization of the Pi-k(h) gene of rice, which confers resistance to Magnaporthe grisea. Mol Genet Genomics 274: 569–578.

== See also ==
- Genetic marker
- Gene mapping
