= Shillong Cherry Blossom Festival =

Cultural festival in India

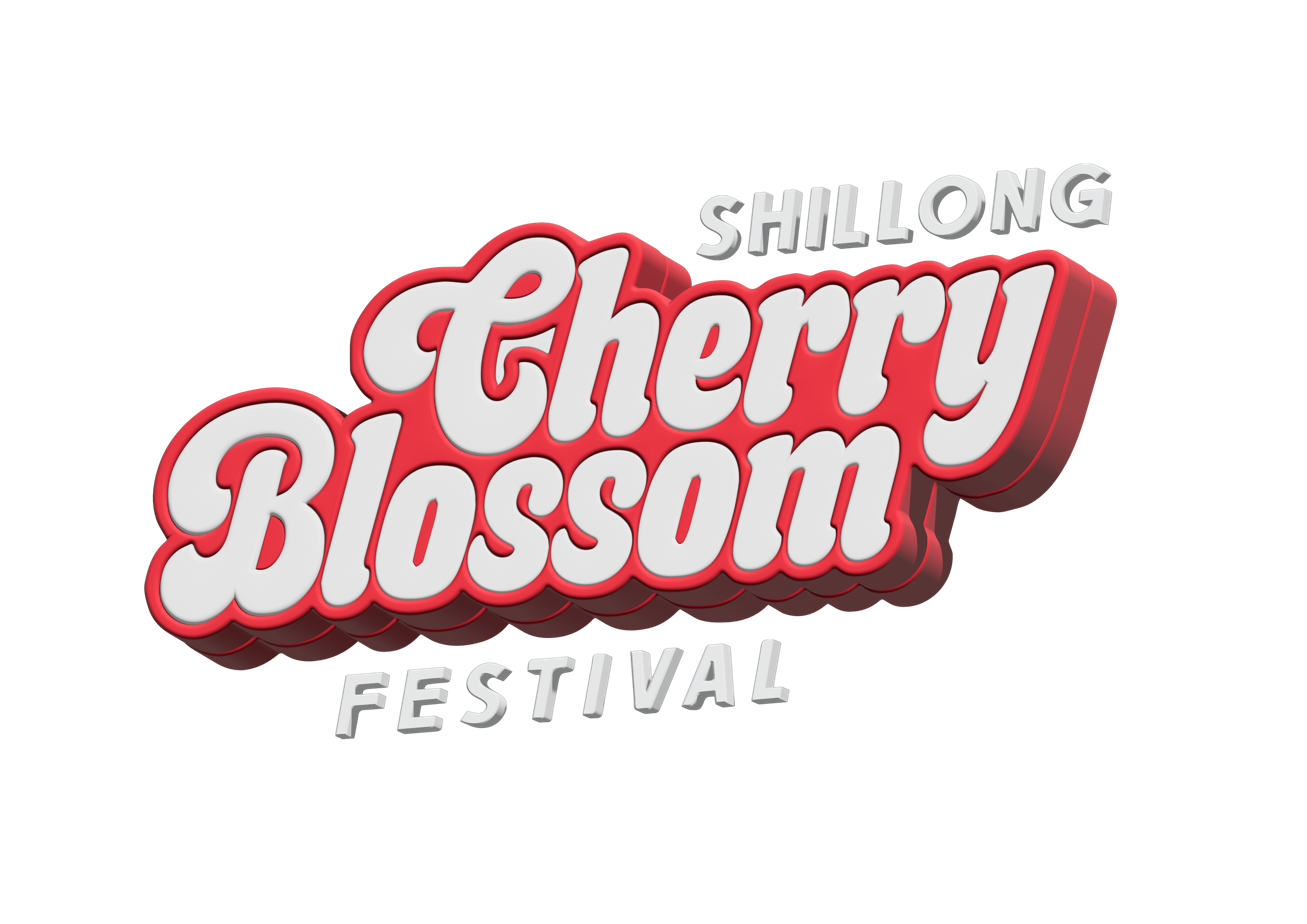
- Shillong Cherry Blossom Festival Logo

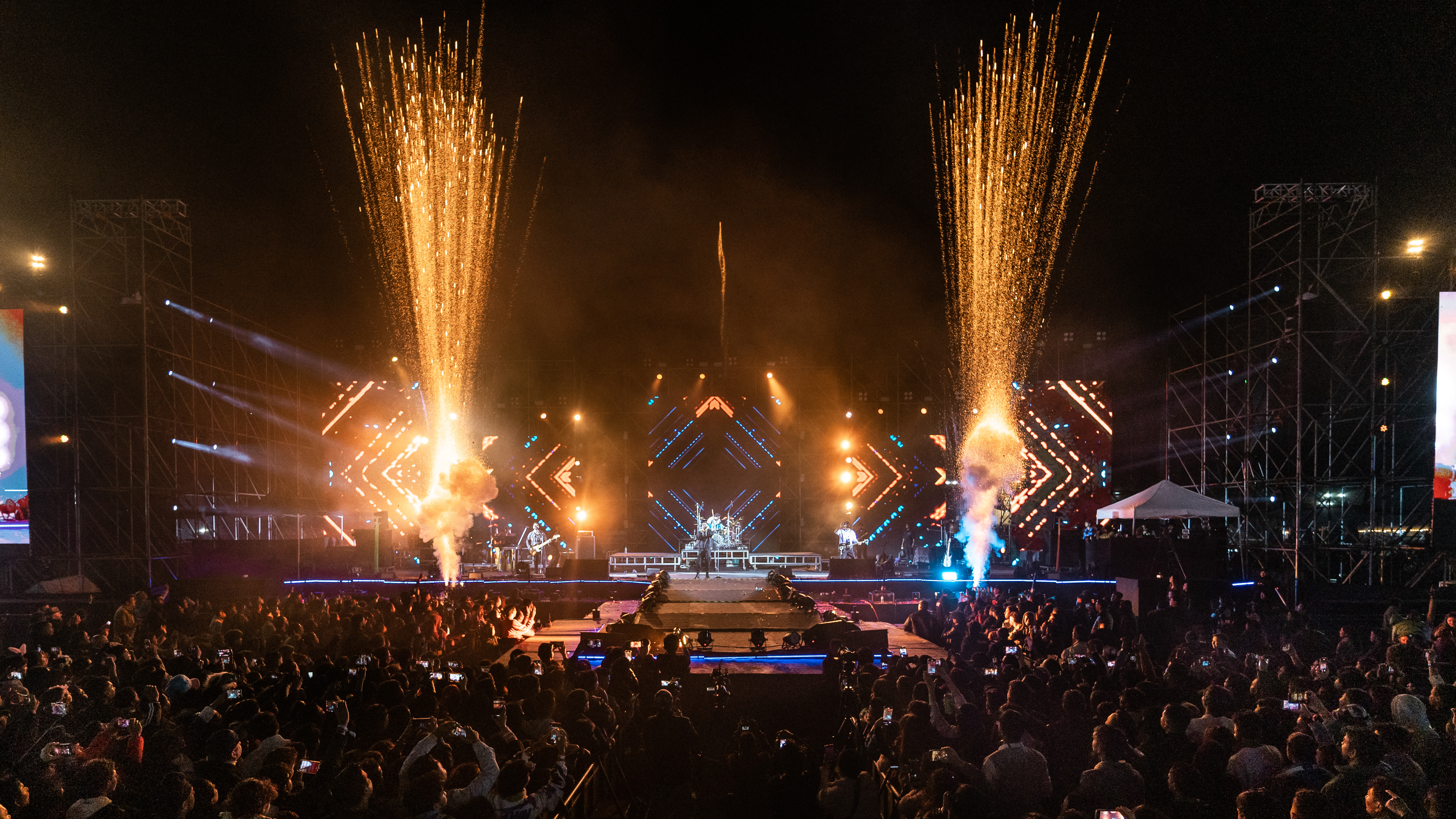
- Shillong Cherry Blossom Festival
- Genre: Cultural
- Location: Shillong
- Country: India
- Years active: 2016-present
- Attendance: 60,000+
- Organiser: Government of Meghalaya, RockskiTickets

Shillong Cherry Blossom Festival is an annual cultural event held in Shillong, the capital city of Meghalaya, India. Celebrated primarily in November, the festival coincides with the blooming of cherry blossoms, drawing comparisons to similar festivals in Japan and other regions known for this phenomenon.

The festival has featured headliner lineups like Akon, R3HAB, Jasleen Royal, Kanika Kapoor, Boney M, The Great Society, Jonas Blue, Ne-Yo and many more.

== Overview ==
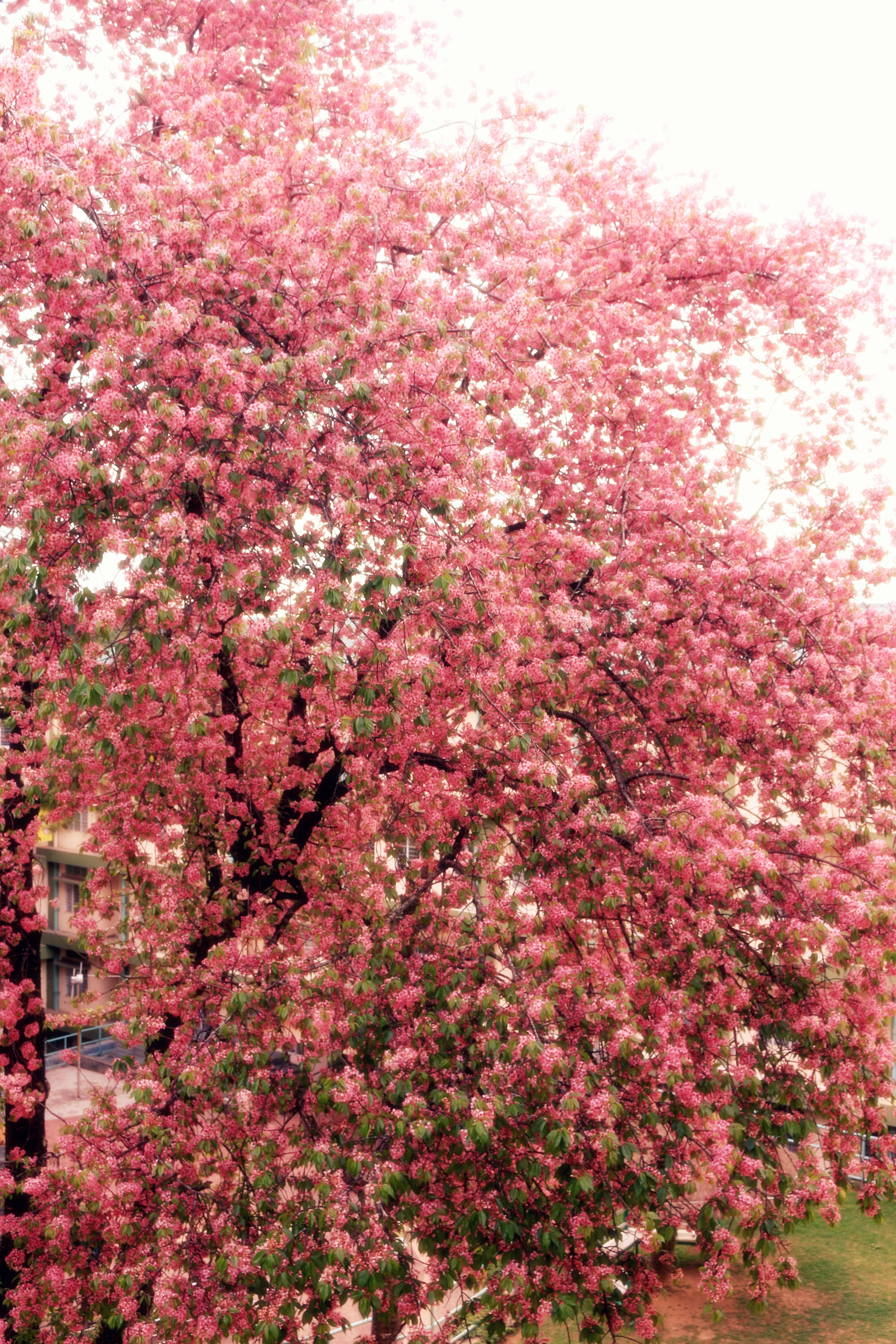
Cherry Blossoms in Shillong

The festival typically spans 2–3 days, with each day featuring a diverse range of events, including a music festival that has gained significant attention for its international major lineup. In addition to music performances, the festival offers fashion shows, cultural performances, food stalls, exhibitions, and art. Over the years, it has evolved into a vibrant platform that showcases local and international talent, promoting both artistic and cultural exchange. The event has seen over 50,000 attendees per event.

== History ==
The Shillong Cherry Blossom Festival was first organized in 2016 as an initiative by the Government of Meghalaya to promote tourism in the region. Led by Forest and Environment Minister Prestone Tynsong, with support from the Institute of Bioresources and Sustainable Development (IBSD), The festival has expanded in both size and attendance over the years, gaining attention from the media for its floral displays and a wide variety of cultural events. It attracts visitors from different parts of India as well as international tourists.

In 2022, The festival was cancelled due to the violence and killings in the West Karbi Anglong district of Assam, which is close to the border with Meghalaya.

=== Partnership with Japan ===
In 2024, Chief Minister Conrad K Sangma announced the official partnership with Japan for the Shillong Cherry Blossom Festival after the Japanese Ambassador visited the state in 2023. The partnership introduced a Japan Zone at the festival, showcasing the country's diverse and rich culture.

=== International Expansion ===
In 2022, the festival held its first international event in Thailand.

In 2024, The event won 2 awards at WOW Awards Asia 2022 for " Concert of the Year" & " Festival of the Year".

They announced their 2024 event to be held on November 15 for 2 days.
