= Souvik Maiti =

Indian chemist (born 1971)

Souvik Maiti (born in 1971) is an Indian chemist known for his studies in the fields of biophysical chemistry and chemical biology focusing on nucleic acids, DNA and RNA. He works at the Institute of Genomics and Integrative Biology. He is also visiting scientist at National Chemical Laboratory Pune and Adjunct Professor at IISER Mohali.

== Education ==
He graduated with a bachelor's (1993) and master's (1995) degree in chemistry from Jadavpur University, Kolkata. He completed his doctoral research in 1999 in the field of polymer chemistry from CSIR-Indian Institute of Chemical Technology, Hyderabad.

== Leadership Role ==
Souvik Maiti serves as the Director https://www.igib.res.in/Administration-&-Technical-Staff for the institute, CSIR-Institute of Genomics and Integrative Biology, New Delhi.

== Research ==
He is known for his studies on biophysical aspect of quadruplexes, locked nucleic acids. He is also known for his work on silencing microRNAs by small molecules. His group has invented nucleic acid-based enzyme as silencers for microRNA, known as antagomirzymes. He is recipient of CSIR, NASI-Scopus, CDRI, AVRA Young Scientist Awards and Shanti Swarup Bhatnagar Award in Chemistry, Shanti Swarup Bhatnagar awards in 2014., National Bioscience Award for Career Development of the Department of Biotechnology in 2015. in Biology, as well as Swarnajayanti Fellowships in Biological Sciences. He is fellow of Indian Academy of Sciences, Bangalore, and Indian National Academy of Science, Delhi.

Souvik Maiti and Debojyoti Chakraborty, have jointly led development of an indigenous CRISPR gene-editing platform based on an engineered variant of Cas9 known as enFnCas9/FnCas9, developed to build a clinically viable pathway for translating genome-editing therapies within India's scientific and public health context.

Along with his colleague, Debojyoti Chakraborty, he has co-invented a rapid test for COVID-19, FnCas9 Editor-Linked Uniform Detection Assay, FELUDA. (named after Feluda, a popular fictional detective created by the late Satyajit Ray.) Tata Sons has obtained license from CSIR for commercial launch of this test. Tata group has established a new company, TATA MD and launched this test as a brand name "TATA MD Check". In 2021, CSIR and Tata MD partner to ramp up COVID testing capacity across tier 2, 3 towns and rural areas.

Building on this platform, the two researchers developed BIRSA 101 https://www.pib.gov.in/PressReleasePage.aspx?PRID=2261232&reg=48&lang=2, described as India's first indigenous CRISPR-based gene therapy for sickle cell disease.The therapy was launched with a technology transfer and collaboration agreement between CSIR-IGIB and the Serum Institute of India, enabling large-scale, cost-effective production of CRISPR therapies for sickle cell disease and other genetic disorders. The therapy is named after tribal freedom fighter Birsa Munda and targets sickle cell disease, which disproportionately affects India's tribal populations. It aims to offer a potentially permanent cure at a fraction of the cost of existing global CRISPR-based therapies, which run into millions of dollars
