= Anurag Agrawal =

Anurag Agrawal may refer to:

- Anurag Agrawal (ecologist) (born 1972), American professor of ecology
- Anurag Agrawal (medical scientist) (born 1972), Indian pulmonologist
