= Maddika Subba Reddy =

Indian cell biologist

- Born: India
- Education: University of Manitoba; Yale University
- Known for: Studies on cell signaling and phosphatases
- Awards: 2017 NASI-Scopus Young Scientist Award; 2017/18 N-BIOS Prize
- Scientific career
- Fields: Cell biology
- Workplaces: Centre for DNA Fingerprinting and Diagnostics
- Doctoral advisor: Junjie Chen

Maddika Subba Reddy is an Indian cell biologist and the head of the Laboratory of Cell Death and Cell Survival (LCDCS) of the Centre for DNA Fingerprinting and Diagnostics. A Wellcome-DBT Senior Fellow, Reddy is known for his studies cell signaling and phosphatases. The Department of Biotechnology of the Government of India awarded him the National Bioscience Award for Career Development, one of the highest Indian science awards, for his contributions to biosciences, in 2017/18.

== Biography ==
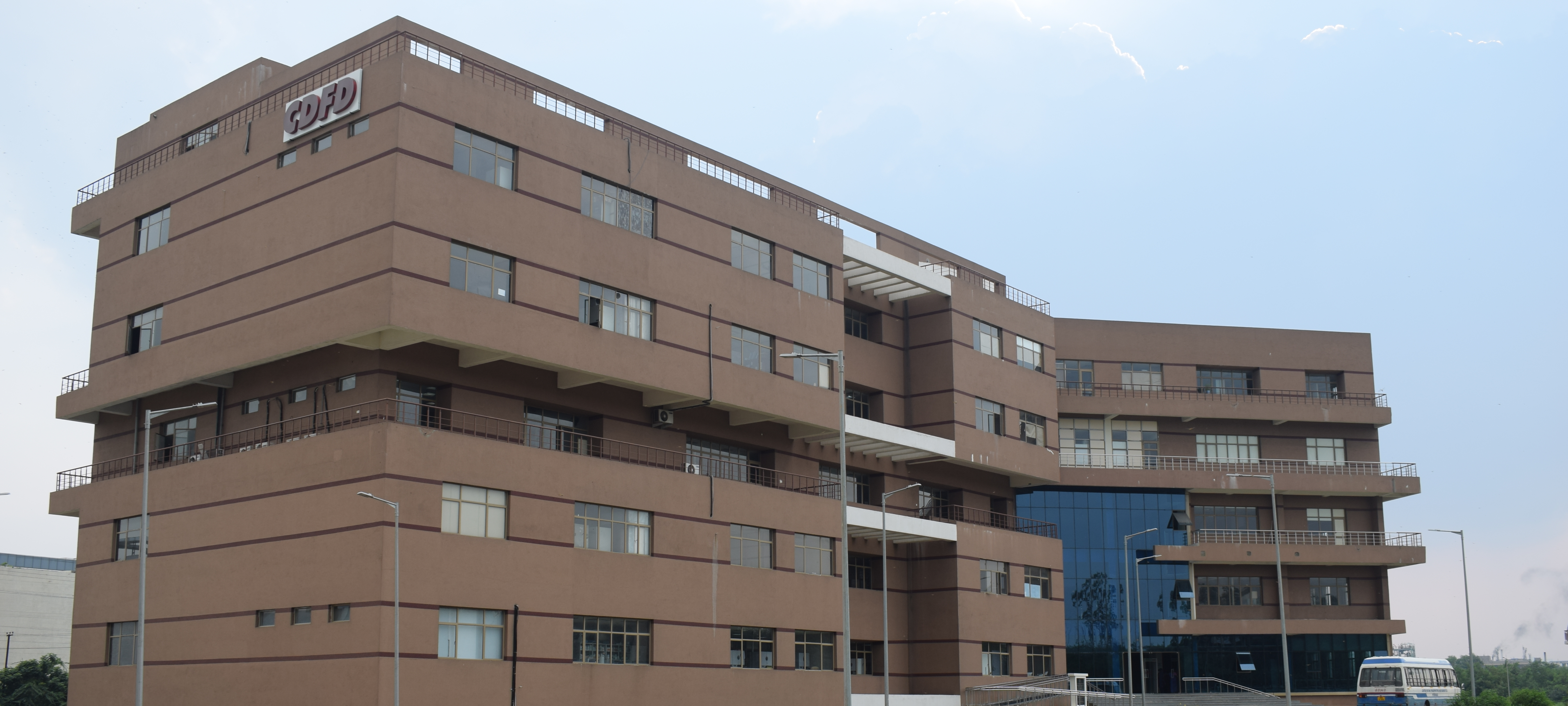
CDFD campus

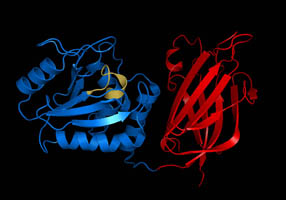
Phosphatase and tensin homolog (PTEN)

Maddika Subba Reddy secured his PhD in Biochemistry and Medical Genetics from the University of Manitoba in 2007. His post-doctoral training was at the laboratory of Junjie Chen of Yale University and on his return to India in 2009, he joined the Centre for DNA Fingerprinting and Diagnostics (CDFD) where he heads the Laboratory of Cell Death and Cell Survival (LCDCS). A Wellcome Trust-DBT India Alliance senior fellow since 2016, Reddy is known for his studies on cellular phosphatases and cellular signaling pathways.

The team led by Reddy is credited with the identification of NEDD4-like E3 ubiquitin-protein ligase WWP2, an E3 ligase, as a regulator for PTEN, a tumor suppressor gene and the discovery is reported to have significance in controlling cell proliferation, thereby in controlling cancer. He has published a number of articles; (Note: Please see Selected bibliography section) ResearchGate, an online repository of scientific articles has listed 77 of them.

== Awards and honors ==
The Department of Biotechnology of the Government of India awarded him the National Bioscience Award for Career Development, one of the highest Indian science awards, for his contributions to biosciences, in 2017/18. An elected member of the Guha Research Conference and a former young associate of the Indian Academy of Sciences, he is also a recipient of the NASI-Scopus Young Scientist Award of the Elsevier and National Academy of Sciences, India for the year 2017.

== Selected bibliography ==
- Maddika, Subbareddy; Gangula, Narmadha Reddy (2017-08-25). "Interplay between the phosphatase PHLPP1 and E3 ligase RNF41 stimulates proper kinetochore assembly via the outer-kinetochore protein SGT1". Journal of Biological Chemistry. 292 (34): 13947–13958. doi:10.1074/jbc.M117.782896. ISSN 1083-351X. PMC 5572923. PMID 28696259.
- Maddika, Subbareddy; Gangula, Narmadha Reddy (2013-11-29). "WD Repeat Protein WDR48 in Complex with Deubiquitinase USP12 Suppresses Akt-dependent Cell Survival Signaling by Stabilizing PH Domain Leucine-rich Repeat Protein Phosphatase 1 (PHLPP1)". Journal of Biological Chemistry. 288 (48): 34545–34554. doi:10.1074/jbc.M113.503383. ISSN 1083-351X. PMC 3843068. PMID 24145035.
- Maddika, Subbareddy; Shinde, Swapnil Rohidas (2016-02-12). "PTEN modulates EGFR late endocytic trafficking and degradation by dephosphorylating Rab7". Nature Communications. 7 10689. Bibcode:2016NatCo...710689S. doi:10.1038/ncomms10689. ISSN 2041-1723. PMC 4754336. PMID 26869029.
- Los, Marek; Ghavami, Saeid; Gibson, Spencer B.; Johar, Dina; Booy, Evan P.; Maddika, Subbareddy (2005-10-01). "Cancer-specific toxicity of apoptin is independent of death receptors but involves the loss of mitochondrial membrane potential and the release of mitochondrial cell-death mediators by a Nur77-dependent pathway". Journal of Cell Science. 118 (19): 4485–4493. doi:10.1242/jcs.02580. ISSN 1477-9137. PMID 16179607.
- Maddika, Subbareddy; Chen, Junjie; Srinivasulu, Mukta; Sastry, Regulagadda A.; Rao, Subramanyeshwar; Pattnaik, Sujit; Vamsy, Mohana; Gowrishankar, Swarnalata; Bashyam, Murali D. (2013-01-01). "PNUTS Functions as a Proto-Oncogene by Sequestering PTEN". Cancer Research. 73 (1): 205–214. doi:10.1158/0008-5472.CAN-12-1394. ISSN 1538-7445. PMC 3538077. PMID 23117887.

== See also ==
- Kinetochore
- PTEN (gene)
