= Agricultural wastes =

Agricultural wastes may refer to:

- Agricultural pollution, byproducts of farming practices that can result in degradation of surrounding ecosystems
- Agricultural wastewater
- Green waste, biodegradable waste
- The former title of the scientific journal Bioresource Technology
