= Pulok Mukherjee =

Indian scientist (born 1968)

Pulok K Mukherjee PhD, FRSC, FNASc
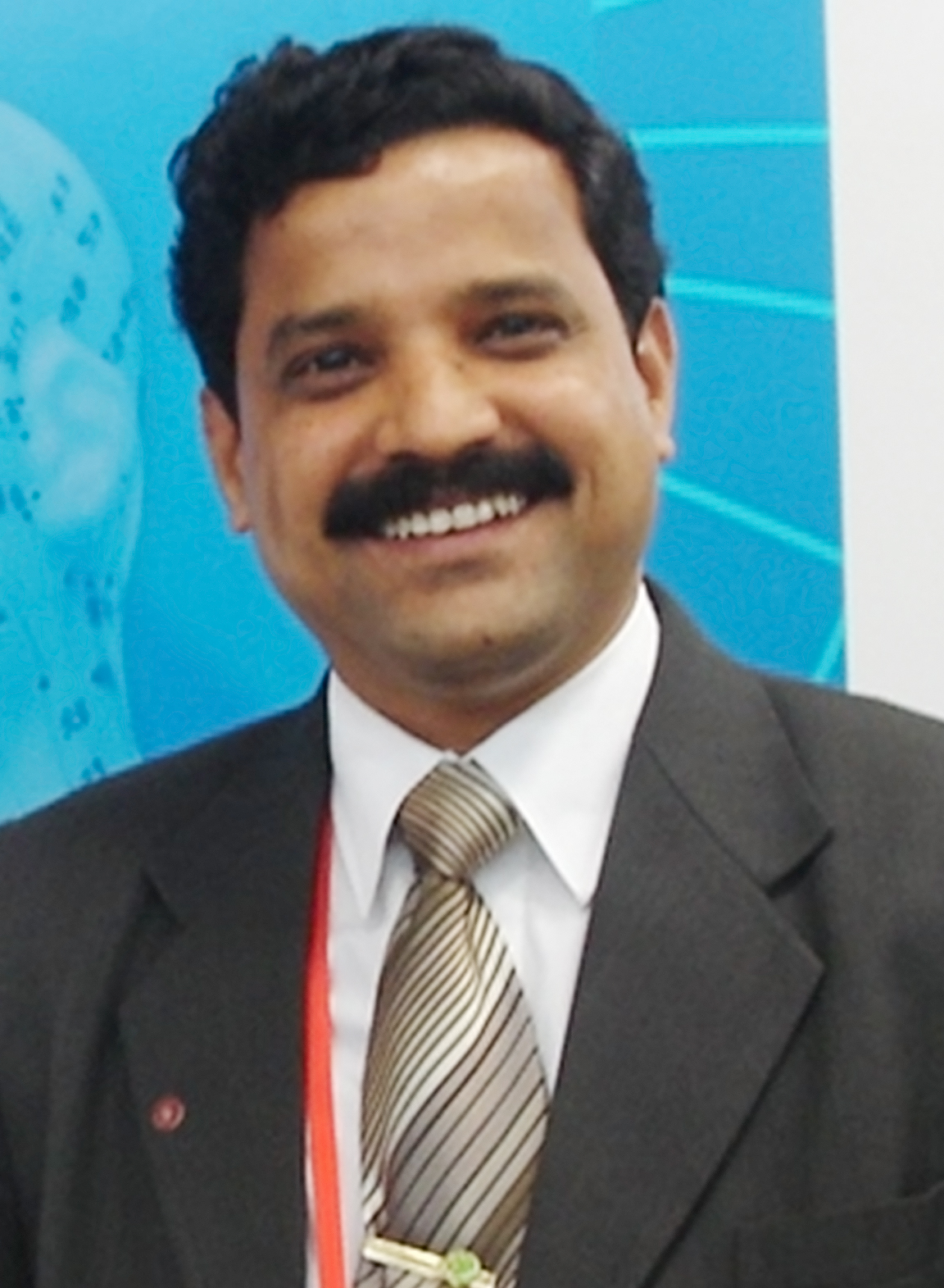
- Born: 12 December 1968 (age 57); Sandhipur, West Bengal, India
- Education: Jadavpur University, Kolkata, India; Leiden University, The Netherlands
- Organization(s): Jadavpur University, Kolkata; Former Director (Addtional charges); Institute of Life Sciences; Former Director, Institute of Bioresources and Sustainable Development
- Honours: FRSC; FNASc; FNAAS; FAScT
- Website: https://www.pulokmukherjee.com/

Pulok Kumar Mukherjee is an Indian pharmaceutical scientist and academic whose research focuses on natural products, ethnopharmacology, bioprospecting and translational drug discovery. He is the professor in the Department of Pharmaceutical Technology at Jadavpur University, Kolkata State, India. He is an associate editor of the Phytomedicine and editor-in-chief of Systems Ethnopharmacology and Sustainable Bioresources. He has previously held director positions at the Institute of Bioresources and Sustainable Development and the Institute of Life Sciences, India.

== Biography ==
Mukherjee obtained a master's and a PhD in Pharmacy from Jadavpur University, Kolkata. He then attended the Leiden/Amsterdam Center for Drug Research in the Netherlands as a postdoctoral researcher.

Mukherjee is a former president of the International Society for Ethnopharmacology, and a founding member of the Society for Ethnopharmacology, an organization focused on promoting research and knowledge exchange concerning ethnopharmacology and medicinal plants.

== Awards ==
- Fellow of the National Academy of Agricultural Sciences, India (FNAAS)
- Fellow of the National Academy of Science, India (FNASc)
- NASI - Reliance Industries Platinum Jubilee Award
- Fellow of the Royal Society of Chemistry, UK (FRSC)
- DBT-TATA Innovation Fellowship Award, from Department of Biotechnology, Government of India, New Delhi.
- Birbal Sahni Birth Century Gold Medal Award
- Fellow of West Bengal Academy of Science & Technology, India (FWAST)
- Commonwealth Academic Staff Fellowship Award
- Biotechnology Overseas, Award from Department of Biotechnology, Government of India, New Delhi.
- Best Pharmaceutical Scientist of the year from the Association of Pharmaceutical Teachers of India
- Young Pharmacy Teacher Award-2002, from Association of Pharmacy Teachers of India
- DST BOYSCAST fellowship Department of Science and Technology, Govt of India
