= Rajesh Sudhir Gokhale =

Indian chemical biologist (born 1967)

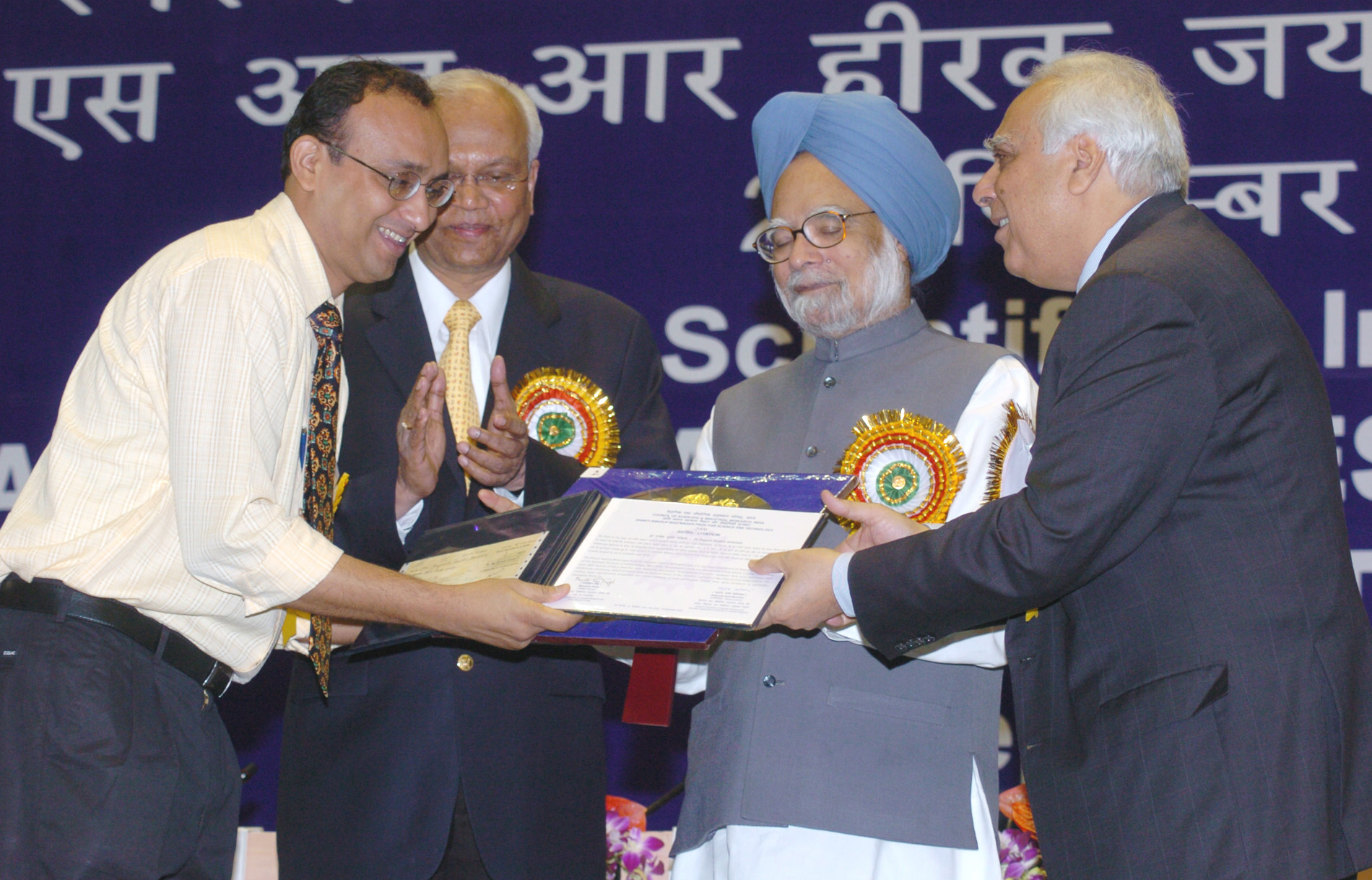
- Rajesh Sudhir Gokhale receiving Shanti Swarup Bhatnagar Prize from Manmohan Singh in 2006
- Born: 16 January 1967 (age 59); India
- Education: Indian Institute of Science
- Known for: Studies on the metabolic diversity of pathogens
- Awards: 2006 Shanti Swarup Bhatnagar Prize; 2009 N-BIOS Prize
- Scientific career
- Fields: Chemical biology
- Workplaces: Indian Institute of Science Education and Research, Pune , Institute of Genomics and Integrative Biology,National Institute of Immunology, India

Rajesh Sudhir Gokhale (born 1967) is a Professor of Biology at Indian Institute of Science Education and Research, Pune on lien. Currently, serving as Secretary for Department of Biotechnology (DBT) Government of India from October 2021 onwards. He joined as a faculty in National Institute of Immunology, India after conducting his postdoctoral training at Stanford University, He was the Director of Institute of Genomics and Integrative Biology from 2009 to 2016. Gokhale is known for his studies on the metabolic diversity of pathogens. He is credited with the discovery of a family of Long-chain Fatty acyl-AMP ligases (FAAL) and his studies assisted in the elucidation of biochemical crosstalk between fatty acid synthases and polyketide synthases in Mycobacterium tuberculosis. He holds US and Indian patents for his invention of Method to Modulate Pigmentation Process in the Melanocytes of Skin. An alumnus of the Indian Institute of Science, he is an elected fellow of the Indian Academy of Sciences (2007) and the Indian National Science Academy (2014). The Council of Scientific and Industrial Research, the apex agency of the Government of India for scientific research, awarded him the Shanti Swarup Bhatnagar Prize for Science and Technology, one of the highest Indian science awards, in 2006, for his contributions to biological sciences. He received the National Bioscience Award for Career Development of the Department of Biotechnology in 2009.
