= Rajender Singh Sangwan =

Indian biochemist and professor

Rajender Singh Sangwan (born 24 August 1958) is an Indian biochemist, professor and agriculture biotechnologist. He is the Director and Vice-Chancellor of Academy of Scientific and Innovative Research (AcSIR), India. He was the founder CEO of Center of Innovative and Applied Bioprocessing (CIAB), Mohali. He was also the former executive director of National Agri-Food Biotechnology Institute (NABI), Mohali. Known for his contributions to the field of food and agricultural biotechnology, he is an elected fellow of Indian National Science Academy (INSA), National Academy of Sciences, India (NASI) and National Academy of Agricultural Sciences (NAAS).

== Early life ==
Sangwan was born on 24 August 1958 at Badal village in Haryana, India. He graduated in B.Sc. (chemistry, botany and zoology) at Kurukshetra University in 1979. He has done master's degree in biochemistry from Haryana Agricultural University 1981. He completed his Ph.D. in biochemistry from Haryana Agricultural University in 1987. He went to Queens University at Kingston, Ontario, Canada, for his postdoctoral research.

== Career ==
He is the founder of Center of Innovative and Applied Bioprocessing (CIAB) and was the CEO from May 2012 to August 2017. He was the former executive director of National Agri-Food Biotechnology Institute (NABI) from June 2016 to January 2017.

Rajender Singh Sangwan joined as the first regular director of Academy of Scientific and Innovative Research (AcSIR) on 17 August 2017.

He has more than 125 publications in international journals and has several patents to his name.

== Awards ==
- IUBMB Young Biochemists (Travel) Award in 1992.
- CSIR Young Scientist Award in Biological Sciences in 1994.
- Professor Umakant Sinha Memorial Award in 1998.
- CSIR Technology Award (Life Sciences) in 2015.

He is also an elected fellow of Indian National Science Academy (INSA), National Academy of Sciences, India (NASI) and National Academy of Agricultural Sciences (NAAS).
