= Institute of Life Sciences, India =

Government biotechnology research institute in India

- Motto: Seeking Insights into Life
- Established: February 11, 1989; 37 years ago
- Laboratory type: Autonomous Research Institute
- Research type: Multidisciplinary research in Life sciences
- Field of research: Infectious disease; Cancer Biology; Genetic & Autoimmune Diseases; Plant & Microbial Biotechnology
- Director: Debasis Dash
- Chairperson: Rajesh Sudhir Gokhale
- Location: Bhubaneswar, Odisha, India; 20.3140528°N 85.814883°E
- Funded by: Department of Biotechnology
- Affiliations: Regional Centre for Biotechnology
- Operating agency: Biotechnology Research and Innovation Council
- Website: www.ils.res.in

The Institute of Life Sciences, India (ILS) is an autonomous research institute located in Bhubaneswar, Odisha under the Department of Biotechnology (DBT) for research in the area of cancer biology, infectious disease and plant biotechnology research.

It was established in the year 1989 as an autonomous institute by the Government of Odisha. In 2002 the institute was taken over by Department of Biotechnology, India and was later Prime Minister of India Shri Atal Bihari Vajpayee dedicated the institute to the nation in July 2003.

During the COVID-19 pandemic, the institute played a crucial role in sequencing and monitoring of the SARS-CoV-2 strains. The institute also established several facilities to extend their capability of infectious disease research.

The Institute of Life Sciences is currently ranked 13th in India for Biological science category of Nature Index and 26th for Health Sciences.

The institute has recently signed MoUs with IIT Bhubaneswar and All India Institute of Medical Sciences, Bhubaneswar to collaborate in human health research and technical education. An expansion plan of the institiute was announced on 12th August, 2026 with 50 acres of additional land from Govt. of Odisha.
