= Center of Innovative and Applied Bioprocessing =

Research institute in India

Coordinates: 30.6679°N 76.7210°E

Center of Innovative and Applied Bioprocessing (CIAB)
- Established: 2012
- Research type: Autonomous Research Institute
- Budget: Government-funded
- Field of research: Biotechnology, Bioprocessing, Agriculture, Nutraceuticals
- Director: Ashwani Pareek (Additional charge)
- Location: Mohali, Punjab, India
- Campus: Urban
- Affiliations: Department of Biotechnology (DBT)
- Operating agency: Government of India
- Website: www.ciab.res.in

Center of Innovative and Applied Bioprocessing (CIAB) is an autonomous national institute under the Department of Biotechnology, Ministry of Science and Technology, Government of India. It is headquartered in Mohali, Punjab, and is uniquely focused on secondary agriculture — converting agricultural residues into high-value bioproducts.

On 31 August 2026, Union Minister Dr. Jitendra Singh inaugurated India's first-ever Green Forge Complex at BRIC-NABI, Mohali, a controlled simulation facility housing chambers that recreate specific light, humidity and temperature conditions to enable cultivation and pre-field assessment of genetically modified crops across hypothetical locations without physical field trials.

== Mission and Mandate ==
The institute's mission is to advance knowledge, technologies, and processes related to the agrifood sector, linking research outcomes to societal impact through entrepreneurship and value addition. CIAB’s mandate includes four major R&D areas:

- Value addition to primary processing residues and agricultural waste for edible products.
- Valorization of crop waste into specialty products and chemicals.
- Development of nutritionals, nutraceuticals, and enhanced bioproducts.
- Biosynthetic technology and synthetic biology for low‑volume, high‑value industrial enzymes and products.

=== Research Focus ===
CIAB focuses holistically on transforming agricultural residues into sustainable, value‑added bioproducts aligned with national goals like “Doubling the Farmer’s Income.”

== Notable people ==
- Rajender Singh Sangwan
- T. R. Sharma

== See also ==
- Department of Biotechnology
