= Anurag Agrawal (medical scientist) =

Indian pulmonologist (born 1972)

- Born: 1972 (age 53–54); India
- Education: All India Institute of Medical Sciences, Delhi; Baylor College of Medicine; University of Delhi
- Known for: Studies on Lung diseases
- Spouse: Anjali Agrawal
- Awards: 2010 Lady Tata Young Researcher Award; 2014 Shanti Swarup Bhatnagar Prize; 2015 N-BIOS Prize
- Scientific career
- Fields: Pulmonology; Mitochondria; Artificial Intelligence in Medicine
- Workplaces: Ashoka University; Institute of Genomics and Integrative Biology; Baylor College of Medicine; University of Delhi

Anurag Agrawal (born 1972) is an Indian pulmonologist, medical researcher, Dean of the Trivedi School of Biosciences at Ashoka University, and the former director of the Institute of Genomics and Integrative Biology, a CSIR institution. Known for his studies on lung diseases, Agrawal has been a senior fellow of the DBT-Wellcome Trust. The Council of Scientific and Industrial Research, the apex agency of the Government of India for scientific research, awarded him the Shanti Swarup Bhatnagar Prize for Science and Technology, one of the highest Indian science awards for his contributions to Medical Sciences in 2014. He is also a recipient of the National Bioscience Award for Career Development of the Department of Biotechnology which he received in 2015 and the 2020 Sun Pharma Science Foundation award in Medical Sciences (Clinical Research).

== Biography ==
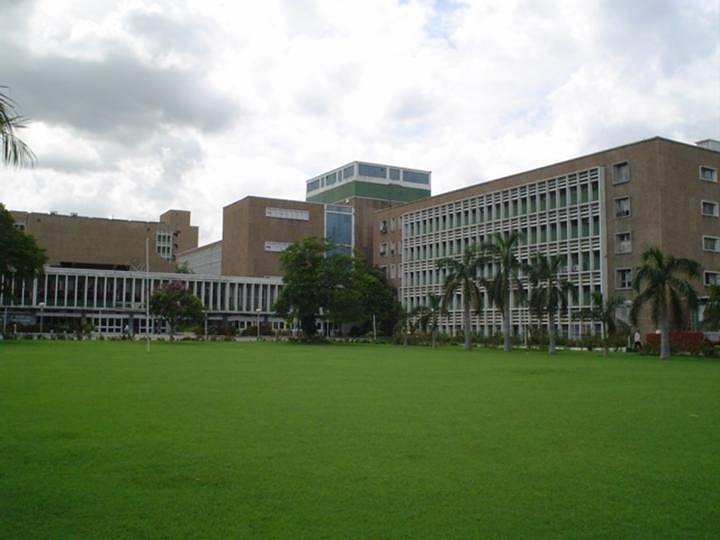
AIIMS Delhi

Anurag Agrawal joined the All India Institute of Medical Sciences, Delhi in 1989 for his MBBS after which he moved to the US for his residency at the Baylor College of Medicine where he also worked as a fellow at the Department of Pulmonary and Critical Care and as an assistant professor. In 2004, he enrolled for his doctoral studies at the Vallabhbhai Patel Chest Institute of the University of Delhi from where he secured a PhD in 2007. Subsequently, he joined the Institute of Genomics and Integrative Biology (IGIB) of the Council of Scientific and Industrial Research and served as the director. In 2022, he joined Ashoka University as the Dean, Biosciences and Health Research, heading the Trivedi School of Biosciences.

Agrawal's research covers the fields of lung diseases, asthma and functional issues related to mitochondria and he is credited with establishing a functional link between the three diseases, thereby elucidating how stem cells donated mitochondrial cells to human lung cells that had turned dysfunctional. He is involved in translational research on disorders such as obesity, asthma and diabetes. His interest in the interface of emerging technologies such as genomics and artificial intelligence with biology and medicine, led to his serving as co-chair of the Lancet and Financial Times commission on governing health futures 2030 and as a member of 'Responsible AI' subgroup of the Global Partnership for Artificial Intelligence (GPAI). During the COVID-19 pandemic, he led discovery of the Delta variant, served as co-chair of the World Health Organization (WHO) Technical Advisory Group for SARS CoV2 viral evolution and also as a member of the pathogens project of the Bulletin of the Atomic Scientists.

== Awards and honors ==
Agrawal received the Lady Tata Young Researcher Award in 2010, the same year as he was selected for the Swarnajayanthi fellowship of the Department of Biotechnology. The Council of Scientific and Industrial Research awarded him the Shanti Swarup Bhatnagar Prize, one of the highest Indian science awards in 2014. A year later, he received the National Bioscience Award for Career Development for the year 2015. He is also a recipient of the senior fellowship of the Wellcome Trust DBT India Alliance. He received the 2020 Sun Pharma Science Foundation award in Medical Sciences (Clinical Research).

== Selected bibliography ==
List of publications: https://scholar.google.com/citations?user=zmebD9QAAAAJ&hl=en

- Aich, Jyotirmoi; Mabalirajan, Ulaganathan; Ahmad, Tanveer; Agrawal, Anurag; Ghosh, Balaram (6 June 2012). "Loss-of-function of inositol polyphosphate-4-phosphatase reversibly increases the severity of allergic airway inflammation". Nature Communications. 3: 877. Bibcode:2012NatCo...3..877A. doi:10.1038/ncomms1880. PMID 22673904.
- Sinha, A.; Krishnan, V.; Sethi, T.; Roy, S.; Ghosh, B.; Lodha, R.; Kabra, S.; Agrawal, A. (1 February 2012). "Metabolomic signatures in nuclear magnetic resonance spectra of exhaled breath condensate identify asthma". European Respiratory Journal. 39 (2): 500–502. doi:10.1183/09031936.00047711. ISSN 0903-1936. PMID 22298617.

== See also ==
- Stem cell therapy
- Respirometry
