= Institute of Bioresources and Sustainable Development =

Research institution in Northeast India

Coordinates: 24.8032°N 93.9049°E

Institute of Bioresources and Sustainable Development (IBSD)
- Motto: Promoting Bioresources
- Parent institution: Biotechnology Research and Innovation Council (BRIC)
- Established: 2003; 23 years ago
- Director: Dr. Nanaocha Sharma (Additional Charge)
- Location: Imphal, Manipur, India
- Website: https://ibsd.gov.in

The Institute of Bioresources and Sustainable Development (IBSD) is an autonomous research institution under the Department of Biotechnology (DBT), Ministry of Science & Technology, Government of India. Located in Imphal, Manipur, it is the only DBT institute dedicated exclusively to researching and sustainably utilizing the unique bioresources of the North Eastern Region of India.

== History ==
IBSD was legally registered in April 2001 under the Manipur Societies Registration Act, 1989. The institute began functioning after the appointment of its first Director on January 18, 2003, and has since pursued its mission of developing bioresources sustainably for socio-economic development in India’s North East.

== Objectives and areas of research ==
IBSD's main objectives are:

- Establishment of state-of-the-art biotechnology research facilities in Imphal, which is located in the Indo-Burma biodiversity hotspot.
- Summarizing and investigating the wealth of biodiversity at India and Southeast Asia's land biogeographic interface.
- Orchestrating biotechnological innovation for sustainable exploitation of indigenous bioresources.
- Developing human capability in bioresource conservation, management, and commercialization.
- Enabling employment generation and regional economic growth through technology transfer.
- Association with national and foreign organizations to advance bioresource research.

== Centres ==
IBSD is headquartered in Imphal and operates a Regional Centre in Gangtok (Sikkim), and Research Nodes in Shillong (Meghalaya) and Aizawl (Mizoram). Additionally, it maintains a Bioresource Park at Haraorou, Imphal, for germplasm collection and conservation.

== Outreach and other activities ==
- IBSD established a Science Museum in Chandel, an aspirational district of Manipur. The museum showcases biodiversity exhibits, traditional bioresources, scientific instruments, and facilitates lectures and community outreach programs.
- The institute actively organizes seminars, workshops, and training programs to promote bio-entrepreneurship and awareness of Northeastern bioresources.
- Initiatives include the Phytopharmaceutical Mission, Himalayan Bioresources Mission, Synergy Mission, and research in Network Pharmacology to foster translational outcomes.

== Notable people ==
- Pulok Mukherjee

== See also ==
- Department of Biotechnology
