= Anil Pareek =

Indian medical researcher

- Born: January 10, 1957 (age 69)
- Occupation: Medical Researcher
- Years active: 1984 - Present
- Spouse: Uma Devi Pareek
- Children: 2

Dr Anil Pareek; (born 10 January 1957) is an Indian medical researcher with contributions in hypertension, metabolic disorder and inflammation. His prior experience includes academics and clinical practice. He is involved in drug development process targeting therapy gaps to create scope for innovative products.

Pareek is currently President, Medical Affairs and Clinical Research at Ipca Laboratories.

== Education ==
Pareek received his MBBS degree in October 1978 from Topiwala National Medical College and Nair Hospital, University of Mumbai, India. He received his M.D. in Internal Medicine and Therapeutics in October 1983 from Topiwala National Medical College and Nair Hospital, University of Mumbai, India.

== Career ==
Dr. Pareek served as faculty at the Topiwala National Medical College and Nair Hospital, Mumbai prior to joining pharmaceutical industry. He worked for various leading Indian pharmaceutical companies. He also served as consultant physician at the Ministry of Health, Saudi Arabia. Presently, he is working as President- Medical Affairs and Clinical Research at Ipca Laboratories Limited.

== Early and personal life ==
Pareek is married to Uma Devi Pareek. The couple have two children, Abhishek Pareek and Aditya Pareek.

== Research and publications ==
Pareek has published his research in scientific journals. Dr. Pareek holds several patents for novel indications and drug combinations.

Based on his research work, hydroxychloroquine is approved for the management of type 2 diabetes in India. It is the first anti-inflammatory agent approved for the treatment of type 2 diabetes. His research work also led to the approval of low-dose chlorthalidone (6.25 mg) and the first combination of chlorthalidone and angiotensin-receptor blocker in India.

His research has helped introduce new products in India which was considered to be useful in clinical practice by many physicians e.g. Hydroxychloroquine (DMARD), low-dose chlorthalidone, beta-Arteether, Aceclofenac.

He has publications in leading medical journals; with one of the clinical studies referred to in the 11th edition of Braunwald's Heart Disease: A Textbook of Cardiovascular Medicine.

Selected articles

- Pareek, AK; Messerli, FH; Chandurkar, NB; Dharmadhikari, SK; Godbole, AV; Kshirsagar, PP; Agarwal, MA; Sharma, KH; Mathur, SL; Kumbla, MM (2016). "Efficacy of Low-Dose Chlorthalidone and Hydrochlorothiazide as Assessed by 24-h Ambulatory Blood Pressure Monitoring". J Am Coll Cardiol. 67 (4): 379–389. doi:10.1016/j.jacc.2015.10.083. PMID 26821625.
- Pareek, A; Chandurkar, N; Thulaseedharan, NK; Legha, R; Agarwal, M; Mathur, SL; Salkar, HR; Pednekar, S; Pai, V; Sriram, U; Khyalappa, R; Parmar, M; Agrawal, N; Dhruv, U; Saxena, S (2015). "Efficacy and safety of fixed dose combination of atorvastatin and hydroxychloroquine: a randomized, double-blind comparison with atorvastatin alone among Indian patients with dyslipidemia". Curr Med Res Opin. 31 (11): 2105–17. doi:10.1185/03007995.2015.1087989. PMID 26371518. S2CID 12536564.
- Pareek, A; Chandurkar, N; Thomas, N; et al. (July 2014). "Efficacy and safety of hydroxychloroquine in the treatment of type 2 diabetes mellitus: a double blind, randomized comparison with pioglitazone". Curr Med Res Opin. 30 (7): 1257–66. doi:10.1185/03007995.2014.909393. PMID 24669876. S2CID 25796285.
- Pareek, A; Chandurkar, N (2013). "Comparison of gastrointestinal safety and tolerability of aceclofenac with diclofenac: a multicenter, randomized, double-blind study in patients with knee osteoarthritis". Curr Med Res Opin. 29 (7): 849–59. doi:10.1185/03007995.2013.795139. PMID 23581533. S2CID 12738358.
- Pareek, A; Chandurkar, N; Chandanwale, AS; Ambade, R; Gupta, A; Bartakke, G (2009). "Aceclofenac-tizanidine in the treatment of acute low back pain: a double-blind, double-dummy, randomized, multicentric, comparative study against aceclofenac alone". Eur Spine J. 18 (12): 1836–42. doi:10.1007/s00586-009-1019-4. PMC 2899439. PMID 19421791.
- Pareek, A; Chandurkar, N; Gupta, A; Sirsikar, A; Dalal, B; Jesalpura, B; Mehrotra, A; Mukherjee, A (2011). "Efficacy and safety of aceclofenac-cr and aceclofenac in the treatment of knee osteoarthritis: a 6-week, comparative, randomized, multicentric, double-blind study". J Pain. 12 (5): 546–53. doi:10.1016/j.jpain.2010.10.013. PMID 21277837.
- Pareek, A; Basavanagowdappa, H; Zawar, S; Kumar, A; Chandurkar, N (2009). "A randomized, comparative study evaluating the efficacy and tolerability of losartan-low dose chlorthalidone (6.25 mg) combination with losartan-hydrochlorothiazide (12.5 mg) combination in Indian patients with mild-to-moderate essential hypertension". Expert Opin Pharmacother. 10 (10): 1529–36. doi:10.1517/14656560902991514. PMID 19514864. S2CID 49656.
- Interview at first World Congress on Cardiometabolic Medicine 2019 on role of pharmaceutical industry on the issue of "Cardiometabolic diseases : How to curb the growing menace"

== Awards ==
In 2008, he received "New Investigator Travel Award" for participating at Jackson Cardiovascular Renal Meeting, 2008, at The University of Mississippi Medical center, Jackson Mississippi. Pareek received "IDMA Margi Memorial Best Patent Awards 2014-15" for hydroxychloroquine combinations in treatment of diabetes. Working with Ipca Laboratories Ltd., Pareek has received "Clinical and Research Excellence (CARE) award 2016" for the category "Clinical Trial Results of the Year" Sponsored by Informa on 27 April 2016 at State Room, Boston, US.

== Patents ==
1. Pharmaceutical compositions for the treatment of diabetes mellitus US8415360B2
2. Pharmaceutical combination comprising Hydroxychloroquine and a DPP-IV inhibitor WO 2013/054345
3. HCQS for prophylaxis and treatment of statin induced diabetes WO 2016/162886
4. A novel pharmaceutical composition of statin with DMARDs Indian Patent Number 256350
5. Pharmaceutical compositions for the treatment/prophylaxis of non-alcoholic fatty liver disease US20120202849A1
6. Treatment and prophylaxis of kidney diseases US20160030415A1

== See also ==
- Chlorthalidone
- Hydroxychloroquine
- Aceclofenac
