= Bioresource Technology =

- Language: English

Publication details
- Former names: Biological Wastes, Agricultural Wastes
- Publisher: Elsevier
- Impact factor: 8.2 (2025)

Standard abbreviations
- ISO 4: Bioresour. Technol.

Indexing
- ISSN: 0960-8524

Links
- Journal homepage

Bioresource Technology is a peer-reviewed scientific journal published biweekly by Elsevier, covering the field of bioresource technology. The journal was established in 1979 as Agricultural Wastes and renamed to Biological Wastes in 1987, before obtaining its current title in 1991. It covers all areas concerning biomass, biological waste treatment, bioenergy, biotransformations and bioresource systems analysis, and technologies associated with conversion or production.

Ashok Pandey, the longtime serving executive editor and editor-in-chief, was found involved in publication scandal. Elsevier found that in 43 of research papers he co-authored in the journal, he added his name and violated the journal policies in the peer review process. All the papers were retracted in 2024.

== Abstracting and indexing ==
The journal is abstracted and indexed in, for example:

- MEDLINE
- PubMed
- Scopus
- Web of Science
