= Ashwani Pareek =

Indian Plant Molecular Biologist and Administrator

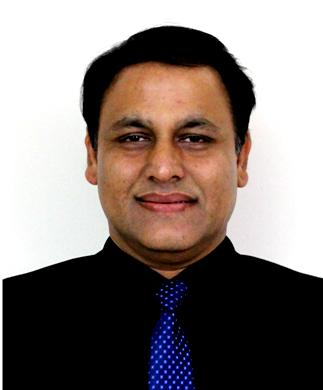
- Education: University of Delhi, India, University of Cambridge, UK, University of California, USA, University of Illinois, USA
- Known for: Research in Plant Molecular Biology and Biotechnology
- Scientific career
- Workplaces: Jawaharlal Nehru University; University of Western Australia, Perth, Australia; National Agri-Food Biotechnology Institute

Ashwani Pareek (born 27 September 1969 in Delhi and native of Sambhar Lake, Rajasthan, India) is Executive Director of NABI a prominent plant biologist and educator noted chiefly for his contribution in plant molecular biology and biotechnology. He is currently working as Professor of plant molecular biology and biotechnology at the School of Life Sciences, Jawaharlal Nehru University, New Delhi, and adjunct professor at the University of Western Australia, Perth, Australia. He is a recipient of several honors including the Visitors award for Technology Development from the President of India for developing Stress Tolerant Rice of the Next Generation (STRONG) that has the potential to enhance the income of rice farmers. The award ceremony was held at the Rashtrapati Bhawan on 2 May 2018. Recently on 26 February 2020, he has been awarded "Tata Innovation Award 2020" by Department of Biotechnology, Govt of India. He has interest in understanding the physiological and molecular adaptations in xero-halophytic plants and development of transgenic rice plants with enhanced tolerance towards multiple abiotic stresses.

== Education and professional career ==
Pareek received bachelor's degree (1987-1990) in botany and master's degree (1990-1992) in plant molecular biology from the University of Delhi. He then joined the laboratory of Professor Anil Grover at the same university in 1992 for doctoral research (PhD) work on ‘Molecular Characterization of stress proteins in Oryza sativa L. with emphasis on 90 kDa family’.

After receiving PhD degree, Pareek received the prestigious Post Doctoral Fellowship by The Rockefeller Foundation, New York and worked with Professor Ralph S.Quatrano at the University of North Carolina, USA during 1997–98. He then accepted the assignment of research scientist at Department of Genetics, University of Delhi South Campus in late 1998. In May, 2001, Pareek was awarded BOYSCAST Fellowship to work with Professor Hans Bohnert at the University of Illinois at Urbana–Champaign, US. Thereafter in 2005, he was awarded the INSA-Royal visiting scientist fellowship to work at University of Cambridge, UK. Pareek joined Jawaharlal Nehru University in 2003 and presently serving there as a professor of plant molecular biology. In 2012, he was conferred the DBT-Overseas visiting fellowship(CREST) to work at The University of California, Davis, US. In 2017, he was appointed as adjunct professor at the University of Western Australia, Perth, Australia.

== Awards and honors ==
- Tata Innovation Award (2020) by Department of Biotechnology, Govt. of India.
- Visitors award (2018) for BEST TECHNOLOGY from The President of India for "STRESS TOLERANT RICE OF THE NEXT GENERATION (STRONG)".
- National Academy of Science (NASI)-Reliance Platinum Jubilee Award (2016) for Industry Oriented Research in Biological Sciences.
- J.J. Chinoy Gold Medal Award (2016) by Indian Society of Plant Physiology (ISPP) for Contribution in the Area of Plant Science.
- Fellowship award (2017) from BIOVED Research Institute of Agriculture and Technology, Allahabad.
- Editor-in-Chief, Indian Journal of Plant Physiology, Springer.
- Elected Fellow of the National Academy of Agricultural Sciences, New Delhi(2016).
- Elected Fellow of the National Academy of Sciences, India (2013).
- DBT-CREST Award (2012) by Department of Biotechnology, Govt. of Indiato work at University of California, Davis, CA, USA.
- INSA-Royal Society, London Award (2005)for Exchange Visitors Fellowship, to work at University of Cambridge, UK.
- BOYSCAST Award by Ministry of Science and Technology (India) to work at University of Illinois, USA (2001).
- The Rockefeller Foundation Award (1997)for the Post-doctoral fellowship at University of North Carolina, USA.

== Research publications and books ==
Ashwani has authored and published more than 150 research papers/articles in the research journals. Some of these journals include Nature, Journal of Experimental Botany, Plant Physiology, The Plant Journal, Plant, Cell & Environment etc. He has edited/ co-edited three books like ‘Abiotic Stress Adaptation in Plants: Physiological, Molecular and Genomic Foundation’, ‘Biotechnology in Medicine and Agriculture: Principles and Practices’. and ‘Pre-Field Screening Protocols for Heat Tolerant Mutants in Rice’.

== Patents and technology transfer ==
Pareek has many patents in the field of plant genetic engineering. Some of them are :

Country	Application No.	Status	Patent No. and Date of Grant	Title of Invention	Refs
India (IN)	1896/DEL/2008	Pending	299477 //31 July 2018	Hybrid-type Histidine Kinase Gene Isolated from Indica Rice IR64, and Clones Produced Thereby	
Europe (EP)	EP 09806540.2	Granted	EP 2350284 //14 Mar. 2018	Hybrid-type Histidine Kinase Gene Isolated from Indica Rice IR64	
Spain (ES)	EP 09806540.2	Validated	ES/EP 2350284	Hybrid-type Histidine Kinase Gene Isolated from Indica Rice IR64	
USA (US)	US 13/058,741	Granted	US 9,234,189 //12 Jan. 2016	Hybrid-type Histidine Kinase Gene Isolated from Indica Rice IR64	
Brazil (BR)	PI 0912473-0	Pending	US 9,234,189 //12 Jan. 2016	Hybrid-type Histidine Kinase Gene Isolated from Indica Rice IR64	
China (CN)	CN200980131254.4	Granted	ZL200980131254.4 // 22 Jun. 2016	Hybrid-type Histidine Kinase Gene Isolated from Indica Rice IR64, and Clones Produced Thereby	
India (IN)	1682/DEL/2008	Granted	304964 // 26 December 2018	Method for Enhancing Regeneration Frequency of Brassica species and Medium therefor	
PCT	PCT/IN20 11/000140	Published		A Method to enhance Multiple Abiotic Stress Tolerance of Crop Plants by over-expression of Cystathionine-β-synthase domain containing gene and Cystathionine-β-synthase domain containing gene therefor	
PCT	PCT/IN2009/000402	Published		Method for Enhancing Regeneration Frequency of Brassica species and Medium therefor	
Philippines (PH)	PH 1-2011-500293	Granted	PH 1-2011-500293 // 11 Feb. 2016	Hybrid-type Histidine Kinase Gene Isolated from Indica Rice IR64, and Clones Produced Thereby	
Vietnam (VN)	VN 1-2011-00649	Granted	P1-0019555 //28 June 2018	A method for cloning a hybrid-type histidine kinase gene and an expression vector comprising the hybrid-type histidine kinase gene	
