= Chaudhary Sarwan Kumar Himachal Pradesh Krishi Vishvavidyalaya =

Agricultural university in Palampur, India

- Type: Public
- Established: May 1966; 60 years ago (as College of Agriculture); November 1, 1978; 47 years ago (as University)
- Chancellor: Governor of Himachal Pradesh
- Vice-Chancellor: R. D. Nazeem, IAS (acting)
- Undergraduates: 1,362
- Postgraduates: 655
- Location: Palampur, Himachal Pradesh, India; 32.101°N 76.547°E
- Campus: 6.49 km^{2}
- Website: www.hillagric.ac.in

Chaudhary Sarwan Kumar Himachal Pradesh Krishi Vishvavidyalaya, also known as CSK Himachal Pradesh Agricultural University (CSK HPKV), formerly Himachal Pradesh Krishi Vishvavidyalaya, is an agricultural university at Palampur in the Indian state of Himachal Pradesh. It was established on 1 November 1978 as an expansion of the existing College of Agriculture established in May 1966. Hill agriculture is the focus of this university. The university is accredited by the Indian Council of Agricultural Research (ICAR).

Capital works investments for the university's land and facilities were provided by state government grants, and grants from the ICAR. In the 2004–05 academic year, approximately 63% of CSK HPKV's annual operating expenditure was funded by HP state government grants, and a further 29% covered by ICAR grants. The remaining funding came from fees collected and other sources.

== Research and extension ==
In addition to the research activities in college departments, the university has five advanced research centres at the main campus in Palampur:

- Advance Centre for Hill Bio Resource & Biotechnology
- Organic Farming Research and Training Centre
- Centre for Commercial Mountain Agriculture and Enterprises Development
- Centre for Policy Research in Mountain Agriculture & Rural Development
- Centre for Human Resources Development in Mountain Agriculture

There are eight Krishi Vigyan Kendras (Agricultural Science Centres) at Bajaura, Dhaulakuan, Hamirpur, Kangra, Mandi, Una, Berthin and Kukumseri that conduct research and provide agricultural information to local farmers. In addition, there are five off-campus research and extension centres:

- Highland Agricultural Research & Extension Centre, Kukumseri
- Mountain Agricultural Research & Extension Centre, Sangla
- Hill Agricultural Research & Extension Centre, Bajaura
- Shivalik Agricultural Research & Extension Centre, Kangra

The university has released several varieties of cereals, pulses, vegetables, oilseeds, fodder and tea. It publishes several magazines and journals, both in English and Hindi. There is an Agricultural Technology Information Centre at the main entrance of the university.

== Courses Offered ==
The university offers both undergraduate and post-graduate courses. In UG courses, BSc (Hons) Agriculture, BTech in Food Technology, BSc in Physical and Life Sciences, BSc (Hons) Community Science and BVSc in Veterinary & Animal Sciences are offered here. In PG courses, MSc in Agriculture, PhD in Agriculture, MVSc in Veterinary & Animal Sciences, MSc in Food Science & Nutrition are offered here.

== Rankings ==
The NIRF (National Institutional Ranking Framework) ranked it 19th among Agriculture institutes in India in 2024.
