= Institute of Genomics and Integrative Biology =

Indian scientific research institute

CSIR Institute of Genomics and Integrative Biology
- Abbreviation: CSIR-IGIB
- Predecessor: Center for Biochemical Technology
- Established: 1977
- Type: Government organization
- Purpose: To translate concepts developed in basic biological research to commercially viable technologies for health care
- Location(s): Sukhdev Vihar, Mathura Road, Delhi-110 025.
- Director: Souvik Maiti
- Parent organization: Council of Scientific and Industrial Research
- Website: www.igib.res.in

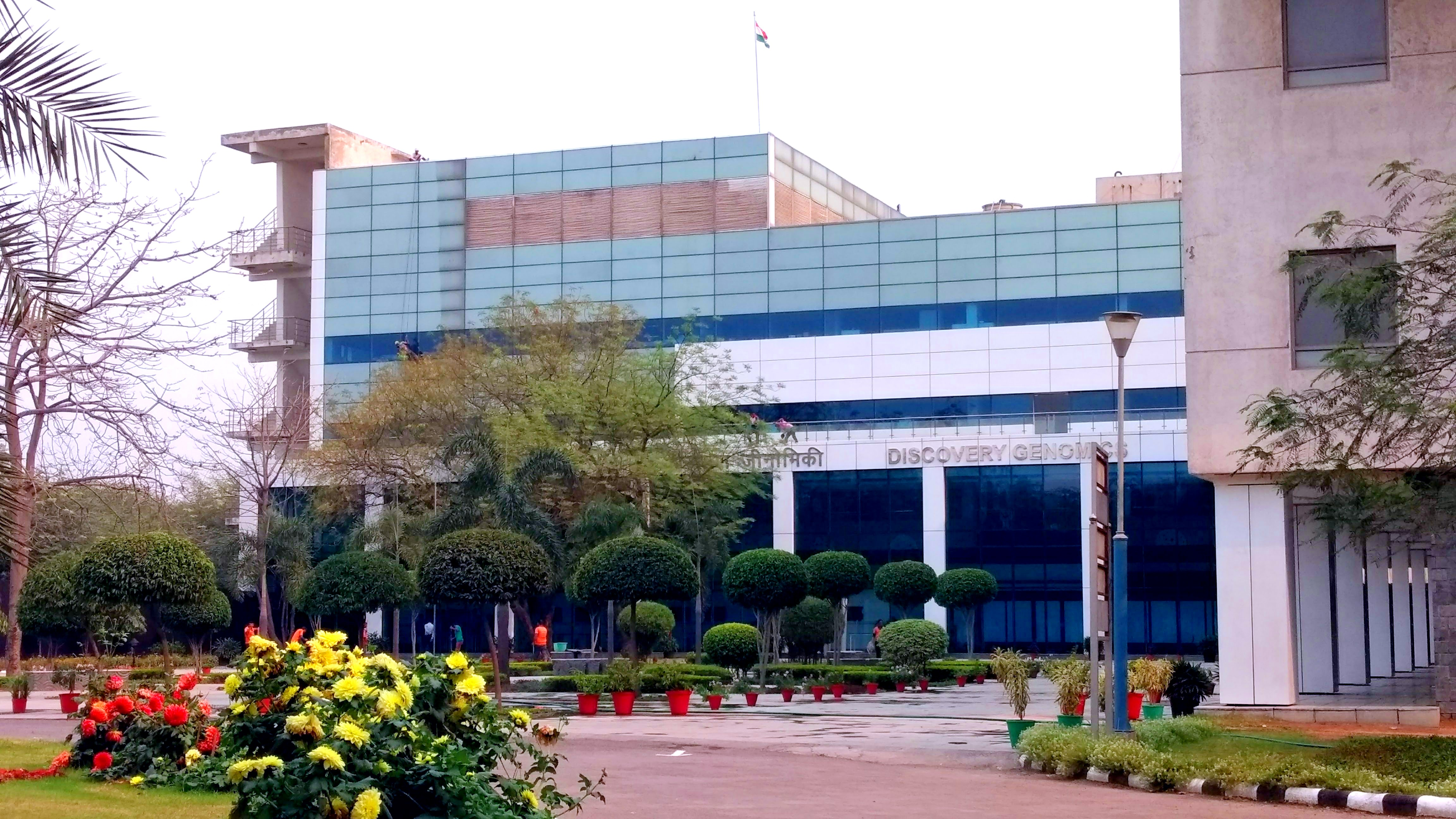
CSIR-IGIB South Campus

CSIR Institute of Genomics and Integrative Biology (CSIR-IGIB) is a scientific research institute devoted primarily to biological research. It is a part of Council of Scientific and Industrial Research (CSIR), India.

The institute was founded in 1977 as the Center for Biochemical Technology with a primary focus on biochemical research, but has since shifted its research focus to integrative biology.

== Location ==
The Institute has two campuses in Delhi. The North Campus is the older of the two campuses and is in the campus of Delhi University, on Mall Road opposite to Jubilee Hall. The new campus is in South Delhi, on Mathura Road at Sukhdev Vihar.

== History ==
IGIB was established in 1977 as the Center for Biochemical Technology (CBT). The Functional Genomics Unit was established in 1998 with the focus shifting from chemical to genomics research. The institute was renamed "Institute of Genomics and Integrative Biology" in 2002. Samir K. Brahmachari served as the founder director, followed by Rajesh S. Gokhale and Anurag Agrawal.

== Achievements ==
In 2009, a team at the institute sequenced the genome of the wild-type zebrafish, with about 1.7 billion base pairs. This made the fish, which is native to the Himalayan region, the first vertebrate to have its whole genome sequenced in India, as previously Indian scientists had only sequenced bacteria and plant genomes.

In December 2009, scientists at IGIB performed the first re-sequencing of a human genome in India. The Institute also collaborated on decoding the first Sri Lankan genome and Malaysian genome. The Institute is also a member of the Open Personal Genomics Consortium.

=== COVID-19 pandemic ===
The institute plays a leading role in the understanding of new variants of SARS-CoV-2 in India and across the world. The institute also maintains a number of informatics resources which are key to identification and characterization of emerging variants of SARS-CoV-2.

Researchers at the institute reported the first high-throughput next-generation sequencing based approach for detection and genetic epidemiology of SARS-CoV-2. This approach has been extensively used to understand the genetic epidemiology of SARS-CoV-2 in the state of Kerala, which has significantly influenced policy and preparedness in the state to curb the spread of the epidemic as well as implementation of evidence based policies.

The institute has been instrumental in creating the concept of MegaLabs for COVID-19 testing and genomic surveillance which also provided the genetic epidemiology of states including Kerala, Andhra Pradesh and Maharashtra.

Researchers at the institute also reported the first cases of COVID-19 reinfection in the country apart from identifying a novel clade of SARS-CoV-2 in India named I/A3i. Researchers at the institute also discovered an emerging lineage with N440K mutation in spike protein associated with immune escape. A comprehensive suite for computational resources to understand the genomes and genetic epidemiology of SARS-CoV-2 has been maintained. One of the first genetically characterized cases of COVID-19 vaccine breakthrough infections was reported by the institute.

Researchers at the institute have been instrumental in the development of COVIDSure, a reverse transcription polymerase chain reaction based kit for diagnosis of COVID-19 and now widely used in India and marketed by Trivitron Healthcare.

Researchers at CSIR-IGIB also developed the test called FELUDA based on CRISPR gene editing which is highly efficient and fast to combat the testing capacity of the country and has been approved by Drugs Controller General of India. The test has been licensed to Tata Group for commercial production.

The institute has also been playing a leading role in the national COVID-19 genomics consortium and maintains the informatics resources and dashboards.

== Genomics of rare genetic diseases ==
The institute has initiated a programme to use new genomic technologies to understand rare genetic diseases in India and pioneer the application of genomics for Precision Medicine in clinics. One of the programmes which has been initiated on this front is Genomics for Understanding Rare Disease, India Alliance Network (GUaRDIAN). GUaRDIAN is a large-scale collaborative network of clinicians from around India trying to use genomics in clinical practice, with the focused aim to understand genetic structure of rare genetic diseases in India.

The consortium aims at using cutting-edge genomics technology to enable identification of genetic variations in diseases and enable clinicians arrive at precise diagnosis for rare genetic disease. Apart from working closely with clinicians, the consortium aims to foster education, awareness and the widespread adoption of genomic technology in clinical settings, in addition to creating and disseminating the highest standards of genomic data generation and interpretation in India.

In the few years, it has been able to work closely with clinicians in the network to be able to offer proof of principles for the application of Genomics for Precision Medicine. A comprehensive programme for patient referral is also functional.

== IndiGen Programme for Public Health ==
The IndiGen programme on Public Health Genomics aims to undertake whole genome sequencing of 1000 Indian individuals representing diverse ethnic groups from India. The data generated as part of IndiGen would provide the baseline for allele frequencies of genetic variants for genetic epidemiology and aid policy decisions. The frequencies of clinically relevant genetic variants would form the template for enabling diagnostic approaches for prevalent genetic diseases and also for optimising therapies through pharmacogenomics. A comprehensive resource providing searchable access to the data is also made available.

== Extension Centers (Branches) ==
The main IGIB campus is located at Mall Road, New Delhi near Delhi University North Campus. IGIB's alliance with the Biotech/Pharmaceuticals has led to its growth and setting up of two extension centers - one at South Delhi (IGIB Annex at TCGA, Okhla) and the other at Western Delhi at Naraina.

== International Meetings ==
IGIB was a co-host of the 13th meeting of the Human Genome Organization (HUGO) in 2008, held at Hyderabad International Convention Centre.

== See also ==
- National Institute of Biomedical Genomics
- National Institute of Plant Genome Research
