= Department of Biotechnology =

Department of the Government of India for Biotechnology

- Abbreviation: DBT
- Formation: 1986; 40 years ago
- Type: Government organisation
- Headquarters: New Delhi
- Region served: India
- Minister of Science and Technology: Jitendra Singh
- Secretary: Rajesh Sudhir Gokhale
- Affiliations: Ministry of Science and Technology (India)
- Website: dbtindia.gov.in

The Department of Biotechnology (DBT) is a department of the Indian government which is under the Ministry of Science and Technology and is responsible for administrating the development and commercialisation in the fields of modern biology and biotechnology in India. It was established in 1986.

== Institutes ==
Autonomous Institutions

- Biotechnology Research and Innovation Council (BRIC)
  - National Institute of Immunology (NII), Delhi
  - National Centre for Cell Science (NCCS), Pune
  - National Brain Research Centre (NBRC), Manesar
  - Centre for DNA Fingerprinting and Diagnostics (CDFD), Hyderabad
  - Center of Innovative and Applied Bioprocessing (CIAB), Mohali
  - National Institute of Plant Genome Research (NIPGR), Delhi
  - Institute of Life Sciences (ILS), Bhubaneswar
  - Institute of Bioresources and Sustainable Development (IBSD), Imphal
  - Rajiv Gandhi Centre for Biotechnology (RGCB), Thiruvananthapuram
  - Institute for Stem Cell Science and Regenerative Medicine (inStem), Bangalore
  - Translational Health Science and Technology Institute (THSTI), Faridabad
  - National Institute of Biomedical Genomics (NIBG), Kalyani
  - National Agri-Food Biotechnology Institute (NIBI), Mohali
  - National Institute of Animal Biotechnology (NIAB), Hyderabad
- Regional Centre for Biotechnology, Faridabad

International Organization

- International Centre for Genetic Engineering and Biotechnology (ICGEB), New Delhi

Public Sector Undertakings

- Bharat Immunologicals and Biologicals Corporation Limited, Bulandshahr
- Indian Vaccine Corporation Limited (IVCOL), Delhi
- Biotechnology Industry Research Assistance Council (BIRAC), New Delhi

Supported Institutes and laboratories

- Kalam Institute of Health Technology (KIHT), Visakhapatnam
- NIMHANS-IOB Laboratory, the Institute of Bioinformatics (IOB) and NIMHANS collaborative laboratory

== Leadership ==
Name	Designation	Department
Dr. Jitendra Singh	Hon'ble Minister of State (Independent Charge)	Ministry of Science and Technology & Earth Sciences
Dr. Rajesh Sudhir Gokhale	Secretary	Department of Biotechnology
Abhinav Gupta	PS to Hon. Minister of Science & Technology	Minister’s Office

== National Biotechnology Development Strategy ==
In December 2015, the Department of Biotechnology launched the National Biotechnology Development Strategy 2015–2020 programme. The stated aim of the programme is to intensify research in the fields of vaccines, the humane genome, infectious and chronic diseases, crop science, animal agriculture and aquaculture, food and nutrition, environmental management, and technologies for clean energy. The mission, through stakeholders in the biotechnology and technology domains is backed with significant investments to create new products, creating a strong infrastructure for research and development, commercialization, and empowering human resources scientifically and technologically.

== Collaboration ==
With an emphasis on microgravity research, space biomanufacturing, bioastronautics, and astrobiology, the Department of Biotechnology and the ISRO have signed a memorandum of understanding (MoU) on 25 October 2024 to collaborate on space biotechnology research. The application will be in ISRO's human space flight project, Gaganyaan. The MoU will address problems like food storage, radiation, microgravity, and constant nutrient supply, as well as health risks like cancer, cataracts, and loss of bone and muscle.

== See also ==
- Maharaj Kishan Bhan
